= List of South African women writers =

This is a list of South African women writers, including women writers either from or associated with South Africa.

== A ==
- Barbara Adair (living), novelist
- Wilna Adriaanse (born 1958), romantic fiction writer
- Jani Allan (1952–2023), journalist, columnist, broadcaster
- Phyllis Altman (1919–1999)
- Ingrid Andersen (born 1965), poet
- Diane Awerbuck (born 1974), novelist

== B ==
- Gabeba Baderoon (born 1969), poet
- Margaret Bakkes (1931–2016)
- Lesley Beake (born 1949), children's author
- Dricky Beukes (1918–1999), writer of novels, short stories and radio dramas
- Lauren Beukes (born 1976), novelist, short story writer, journalist and television scriptwriter
- Audrey Blignault (1916–2008)
- Anna Böeseken (1905–1997), history academic, journalist and writer
- Johanna Brandt (1876–1964)
- Sarah Britten (born 1974), writer and blogger
- Babette Brown (1931–2019), writer on race and diversity issues in the United Kingdom.
- Cheryl Brown (living), professor of education
- Penny Busetto (living), novelist

== C ==
- Maxine Case (born 1976), novelist and short story writer
- Cecile Cilliers (1933–2018), journalist and writer
- Yvette Christiansë (born 1954), poet and novelist
- Lindsey Collen (born 1948), novelist and activist
- Jeni Couzyn (born 1942), poet and anthologist
- Hazel Crane (1951–2003), memoirist
- Judy Croome (born 1958), novelist, short story writer and poet
- Sheila Cussons (1922–2004), Afrikaans poet

== D ==
- Alide Dasnois (born 1950), journalist and newspaper editor
- Nadia Davids (born 1977)
- Marike de Klerk (1937–2001)
- Ingrid de Kok (born 1951), poet
- Phillippa Yaa de Villiers (born 1966), poet
- Janette Deacon (born 1939)
- Isobel Dixon (born 1969), poet
- Ceridwen Dovey (born 1980)
- Finuala Dowling (born 1962), poet

== E ==
- Elisabeth Eybers (1915–2007), poet

== F ==
- Dawn Faith (born 1982), author, musician and social activist
- Diana Ferrus (1953–2026), South African writer, poet and storyteller
- Mary Anne Fitzgerald (born c. 1945), journalist
- Corlia Fourie (born 1944), writer of drama, children's books, short stories and novels
- Lynn Freed (1945–2025), novelist, essayist, and writer of short stories
- Patricia Fresen (1940–2024)
- Lisa Fugard (born 1961)
- Sheila Meiring Fugard (born 1932), writer of short stories and plays

== G ==
- Jeanne Goosen (1938–2020), journalist and poet
- Nadine Gordimer (1923–2014), novelist, political activist and recipient of the 1991 Nobel Prize in Literature
- Lyndall Gordon (born 1941), literary biographer
- Sheila Gordon (1927–2013)
- Pregs Govender (born 1960), feminist human rights activist, author and former Member of Parliament
- Henriette Grové (1922–2009)

== H ==
- Megan Hall (born 1972), poet
- Joan Hambidge (born 1956), Afrikaans poet, literary theorist and academic
- Stacy Hardy (living), writer, journalist, multimedia artist and theatre practitioner
- Marié Heese (born 1942), novelist and teacher
- Cat Hellisen (born 1977), author of fantasy novels
- Colleen Higgs (born 1962), writer and publisher
- Heidi Holland (1947–2012), journalist and author
- Emma Huismans (born 1947), writer, journalist, and activist

== J ==
- Noni Jabavu (1919–2008), writer and journalist
- Cynthia Jele (living), novelist
- Liesl Jobson (living), poet and musician
- Sarah Johnson (born 1980), poet
- Isabel Jean Jones (died 2008), consumer journalist
- Ingrid Jonker (1933–1965), poet
- Pamela Jooste (living), novelist
- Elsa Joubert (1922–2020), Afrikaans-language novelist
- Irma Joubert (living), novelist
- Leonie Joubert (living), science writer, author and journalist

== K ==
- Ronelda Kamfer (born 1981), poet
- Farida Karodia (born 1942), novelist and short-story writer
- Anne Kellas (living), poet, reviewer and editor
- Olga Kirsch (1924–1997), poet
- Elizabeth Klarer (1910–1994)
- Sheila Kohler (born 1941), novelist and short story writer
- Antjie Krog (born 1952), poet and academic
- Ellen Kuzwayo (1914–2006), women's rights activist, politician and autobiographer

== L ==
- Anne Landsman (born 1959), novelist
- Deborah Levy (born 1959), novelist, playwright and poet
- Lauren Liebenberg (born 1972), novelist
- Freda Linde (1915–2013), children's writer and translator
- Anna M. Louw (1913–2003)

== M ==
- Rozena Maart (born 1962)
- Michelle McGrane (born 1974), poet
- Lindiwe Mabuza (1938–2021), poet, academic, journalist, diplomat
- Sindiwe Magona (born 1943)
- Angela Makholwa (living), crime fiction writer
- Barbara Masekela (born 1941), poet, educator, activist
- Mohale Mashigo (living), singer-songwriter, novelist and former radio presenter
- Lebogang Mashile (born 1979), actor, writer and performance poet
- Emma Mashinini (1929–2017)
- Kopano Matlwa (born 1985), novelist
- Dalene Matthee (1938–2005), novelist
- Fatima Meer (1928–2010), writer, academic, screenwriter
- Fiona Melrose (born 1973), novelist
- Joan Metelerkamp (born 1956), poet
- Nontsizi Mgqwetho (fl. 1920s), poet
- Gcina Mhlophe (born 1958), actress, storyteller, poet, playwright, director
- Kirsten Miller (living)
- Ruth Miller (1919–1969), poet
- Sarah Millin (1889–1968)
- Natalia Molebatsi (living), performance poet and cultural worker
- Marion Molteno (born 1944), novelist
- Rose Moss (born 1937), writer of novels, short stories, words for music and non-fiction
- Natasha Mostert (living), author and screenwriter
- Isabella Motadinyane (1963–2003), poet and actor
- Ena Murray (1936–2015)
- Sally-Ann Murray (born 1961)

== N ==
- Beverley Naidoo (living), writer of children's books
- Thirza Nash (1885–1962), novelist
- Bongi Ndaba (born 1972)
- Lauretta Ngcobo (1931–2015), novelist and essayist
- Paige Nick (living), novelist
- Michelle Nkamankeng (born c. 2008)
- Cecily Norden (1918–2011)

== O ==
- Bree O'Mara (1968–2010), novelist
- Yewande Omotoso (born 1980), novelist, architect and designer
- Margie Orford (born 1964), author of crime fiction, children's fiction, non-fiction and school textbooks

== P ==
- Joy Packer (1905–1977), author of autobiography and romantic adventure novels
- S. A. Partridge (born 1982), author of young adult fiction
- Amelia Blossom Pegram (1935–2022), poet
- Antoinette Pienaar (born 1961)
- Bridget Pitt (living)
- Marguerite Poland (born 1950)
- Elsa Pooley (born 1947)
- Karen Press (born 1956), poet
- Elaine Proctor (born 1960), film director, screenwriter, novelist, and actress

== Q ==
- Christine Qunta (born 1952)

== R ==
- Jo-Anne Richards (living), journalist and author
- Margaret Roberts (1937–2017), herbalist and author
- Daphne Rooke (1914–2009)
- Henrietta Rose-Innes (born 1971), novelist and short story writer
- Maria Elizabeth Rothmann (1875–1975)
- Rona Rupert (1934–1995)
- Diana E. H. Russell (1938–2020), feminist writer and activist

== S ==
- Arja Salafranca (born 1971), poet
- Lin Sampson (living), journalist
- Riana Scheepers (born 1957), writer of children's books, short fiction and poetry
- Karin Schimke (born 1968)
- Patricia Schonstein (born 1952), novelist, poet, author of children’s books
- Olive Schreiner (1855–1920), novelist, anti-war campaigner
- Judith Sealy (living)
- Jenefer Shute (living), novelist
- Joyce Sikakane (born 1943), journalist and activist
- Ansuyah Ratipul Singh (1917–1978), medical doctor and writer
- Elinor Sisulu (born 1958), writer and activist
- Paula Slier (living), television, radio and print journalist
- Gillian Slovo (born 1952), novelist, playwright and memoirist
- Charlene Leonora Smith (living), journalist and biographer of Nelson Mandela
- Louise Smit (born 1940), writer of children's books
- Pauline Smith (1882–1959), novelist
- Lina Spies (born 1939), poet
- Dianne Stewart (born 1952)
- Wilma Stockenström (born 1933), writer, translator, and actor
- Cynthia Stockley (1873–1936), novelist
- Toni Stuart (born 1983), poet

== T ==
- Jane Taylor (1956–2023)
- Gladys Thomas (1934–2022), playwright, poet and children's writer
- Miriam Tlali (1933–2017), novelist
- Lesego Tlhabi (born 1988), writer and comedian
- Marianne du Toit (born 1970)
- Barbara Trapido (born 1941)
- Jann Turner (born 1964), film director, novelist, television director and screenwriter

== U ==
- Shereen Usdin (born 1962)

== V ==
- Marita van der Vyver (born 1958)
- Marjorie van Heerden (born 1949)
- Mary-Anne Plaatjies van Huffel (1959–2020)
- Marlene van Niekerk (born 1954)
- Verna Vels (1933–2014)
- Lettie Viljoen, pseudonym of author Ingrid Winterbach (living)
- Anna de Villiers (1900–1979)

== W ==
- Zukiswa Wanner (born 1976), journalist and novelist
- Harriet Ward (1808–1873)
- Marie Warder (1927–2014)
- Crystal Warren (living)
- Mary Watson (born 1975)
- Elizabeth Weber (born 1923)
- Mary Morison Webster (1894–1980), novelist and poet
- Zoë Wicomb (1948–2025), author and academic
- Sarah Wild (living), science journalist and author
- Margaret Wild (born 1948)
- Faldela Williams (1952–2014)
- Wendy Wood (1892–1981)

== X ==
- Makhosazana Xaba (born 1957), poet

== Z ==
- Rachel Zadok (living), novelist
- Rose Zwi (1928–2018)

== See also ==
- List of women writers
