= Thyrza =

Thyrza may refer to:

- Grace Mary Thyrza Kimmins or Grace Kimmins (1870-1954), British writer
- Thyrza Anne Leyshon (1892–1996), Welsh artist
- Thyrza Grey, in Agatha Christie's murder mystery The Pale Horse, one of the three women who claim to be witches
- Thyrza Nichols Goodeve, American art historian
- Thyrza (novel) by George Gissing
- Tirzah (Biblical name)

== See also ==
- Tirza (disambiguation)
- Tirzah (disambiguation)
