= Bob Moon =

Bob Moon may refer to:

- Bob Moon (rugby league) (1933–2023), Australia rugby league player
- Bob Moon (scholar) (born 1945), British professor of education
