= Cecil Pullan =

Indian-born English cricketer

Personal information
- Nickname: Plug
- Batting: Right-handed
- Bowling: Right-arm medium-fast

Career statistics
Competition	First-class
Matches	33
Runs scored	1,049
Batting average	21.40
100s/50s	0/8
Top score	84
Balls bowled	643
Wickets	8
Bowling average	44.62
5 wickets in innings	0
10 wickets in match	0
Best bowling	2/26
Catches/stumpings	20/–
- Source: Cricinfo, 8 November 2022

Cecil Douglas Ayrton "Plug" Pullan (26 July 1910 – 24 June 1970) was an Indian-born English first-class cricketer who played for Oxford University and Worcestershire in the 1930s. He was born in Mahoba which was then part of Bundelkhand.

Pullan attended Malvern College, where he excelled at cricket: in 1928 he came top of the school's batting averages. In 1932 and 1933 he played eight times for Oxford University, taking two wickets: those of Yorkshire's Arthur Mitchell and Free Foresters' Noel Evans. With the bat he made 74 against the Indians and 68 against Worcestershire. However, he did not win a blue as he never played against Cambridge University. Pullan also made one appearance for H. D. G. Leveson-Gower's XI against Oxford.

In 1935, Pullan became a Worcestershire player, making 12 County Championship appearances for them that season. His 289 runs came at 16.05, and included two half-centuries, while his two wickets cost 46 runs apiece. He played not at all for the next two years, but returned in 1938 to make another 13 appearances. This time he was more successful with the bat, hitting 479 runs at 25.21, with an August match against Gloucestershire a personal highlight. Captaining the county in the absence of Charles Lyttleton, he made a career-best 84 in the first innings and followed this up with 55 in the second. Even so, Worcestershire lost by two wickets.

Also in 1938, against Surrey, he took 2-26, the only instance of his taking more than one wicket in an innings (or indeed a match). However, his only other victim – the last of his first-class career – was Nottinghamshire wicket-keeper Arthur Wheat. That was in Pullan's penultimate game: his last was against Northamptonshire, and he bowed out on a high note by scoring 24 not out in an unbeaten ninth-wicket partnership of 36 with Reg Perks to clinch a narrow victory. That was the end of Pullan at this level, although he did play for the Worcestershire Second XI in the Minor Counties Championship as late as 1950.

Pullan was an administrator in the Gold Coast (now Ghana) in the early 1950s. He died at the age of 59 at Tongaat Beach, Natal, South Africa.
