= Thirza =

Thirza is a female given name, a variant of Tirzah. Notable people with the name include:

- Thirza Nash (1885–1962), South African novelist
- Lilian Thirza Charlotte Holt (1898–1983), British artist
- TJ Cuthand (born 1978, originally Thirza Cuthand), Canadian film-maker
- Thirza Petty, the wife of British author and minister John Petty (1807–1868)

== Fictional people ==
- Thirza Tapper, a character in The Farmer's Wife

== See also ==
- Thurza
- Anetia thirza, a butterfly
- Tirza (disambiguation)
- Tirzah (disambiguation)
