= African Deans of Education Forum =

Educational platform formed in Kenya

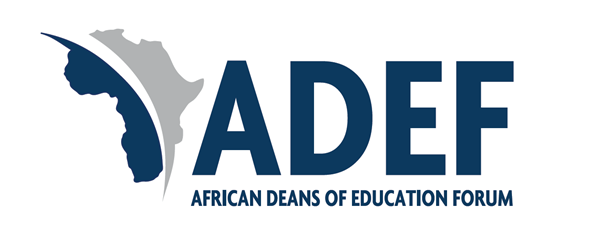
- Formation: July 2013
- Founder: Prof Irma Eloff
- Founded at: Nairobi, Kenya
- Type: Forum
- Legal status: Active
- Website: http://www.deta.up.ac.za/adef.htm

African Deans of Education Forum is an educational platform formed in Nairobi, Kenya. The forum was launched in July 2013 at the DETA 2013 Conference.

== Background ==
The University of Pretoria Faculty of Education, South Africa, took the initiative in 2013 to establish a platform for African deans of education. An informal structure under the leadership of Prof Irma Eloff (University of Pretoria Dean at the time) was established, with the University of Pretoria hosting the Secretariat of the Forum.

The ADEF was launched in July 2013 at the DETA 2013 Conference in Nairobi, Kenya.

Prof Irma Eloff stepped down as the lead facilitator of ADEF on 31 December 2018. She served as Chair and lead facilitator from 2013 - 2018.

Prof Antonio Cipriano Goncalves, the Dean of Education at Eduardo Mondlane University in Mozambique took the Chair and lead facilitator role of ADEF from 1 January 2019 until the end of 2023. He expanded ADEF in lusophone Africa and he also represented ADEF on the KAIROS global forum for discussion, analysis, study and proposals on the future of education.

Prof Gbolagade Adekanmbi from the Botswana Open University started to serve as Chair and lead facilitator of ADEF in early 2024.

== Purpose ==
The purpose of the Forum is to facilitate dialogue on critical issues in teacher education among the leadership of African faculties of education.

== Meetings ==
The first meeting was held at the launch of the Forum during the DETA 2013 Conference, co-hosted by the University of Pretoria, South Africa, and the University of Nairobi, Kenya. The deans of the Faculty of Education of these two institutions, Prof Irma Eloff (University of Pretoria) and Prof Henry Mutoro (University of Nairobi) co-facilitated the Forum. Deans from Anglophone, Francophone, Lusophone and Arabic Africa were present at the founding meeting. Prof Bob Moon, professor of Education at the Open University (United Kingdom) and founding director of the Teacher Education in Sub-Saharan Africa (TESSA) Programme, served as distinguished guest at the founding meeting. 26 signatories accompanied the founding meeting.

The second meeting of ADEF was hosted by the Faculty of Education, University of Pretoria, South Africa in July 2014. Prof Irma Eloff hosted and facilitated the meeting. Prof Themba Mosia delivered an address on the critical role of deans at African universities.

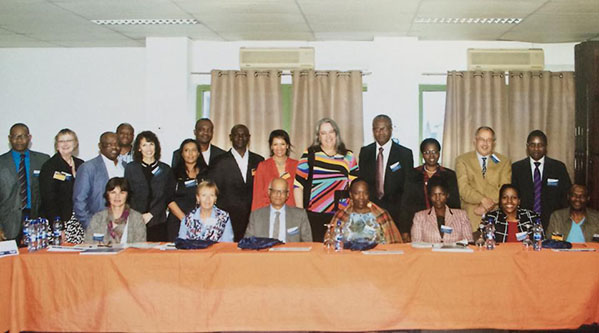
Delegates at the third ADEF meeting in Mauritius

The third meeting was held during the DETA 2015 Conference, July 2015, hosted by the Mauritius Institute of Education. The meeting was co-facilitated by Dr Oomandra Varma, Director of the Mauritius Institute of Education, and Prof Irma Eloff, Dean of the Faculty of Education, University of Pretoria.

At the meetings, participants mapped out critical issues for teacher education and development in Africa, shared their experiences and suggested an agenda for future communication and discussion amongst deans of Education in Africa.

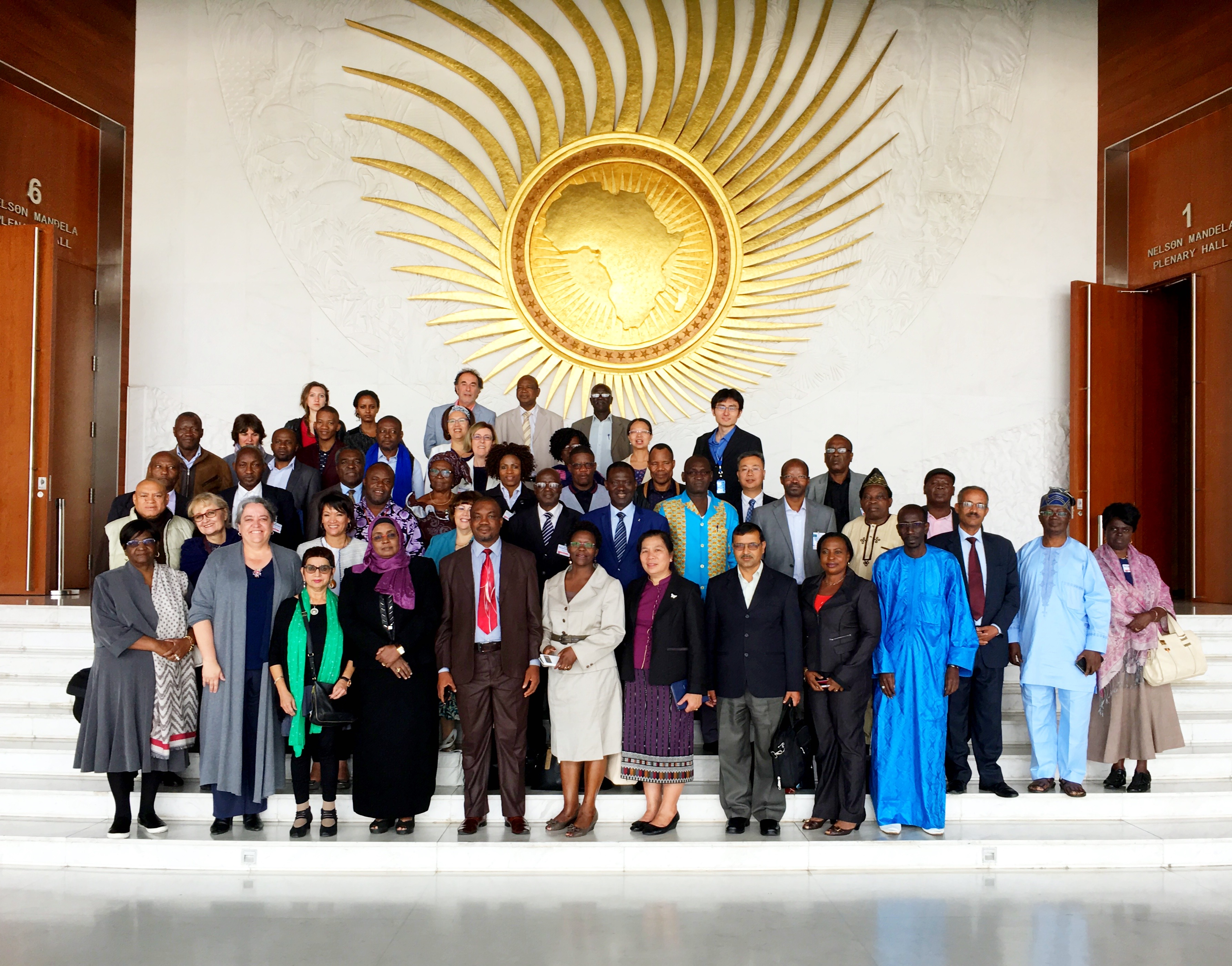
ADEF meeting at the African Union in Addis Ababa, Ethiopia.

In June 2016 ADEF met at the African Union in Addis Ababa, Ethiopia. Various deans presented innovative approaches in which teacher education was addressed within their respective contexts. The growing role of technology in teacher education featured prominently during the presentations. An Interim Steering Committee, representing the regional African deans, was constituted.

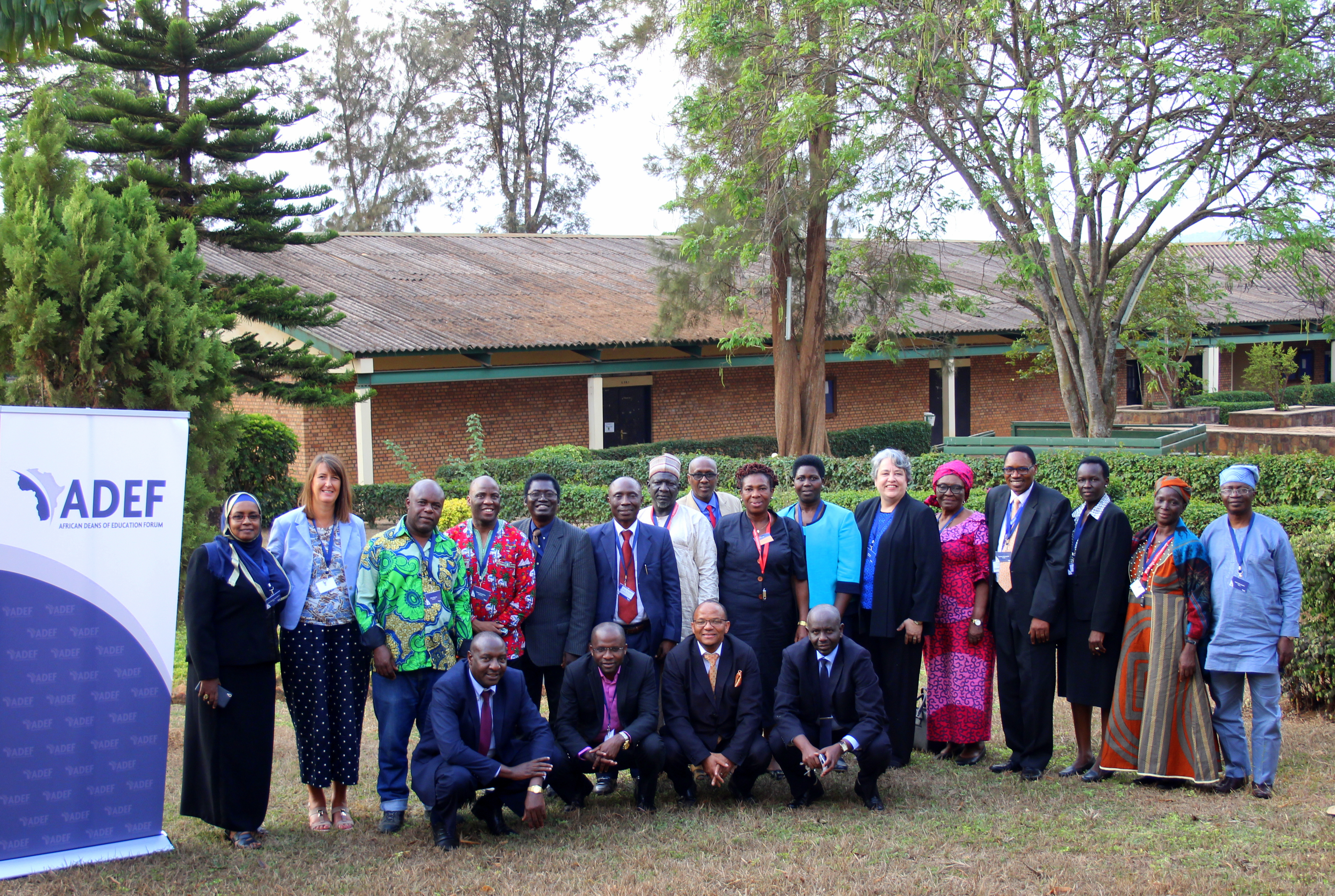
ADEF members at the Kigali-meeting in Rwanda, 22 August 2017.

In August 2017 ADEF met at the University of Rwanda in Kigali. The role of ADEF as a focal point of the UNESCO Teacher Task Force was discussed. Ideas for a cohesive project that would leverage the expertise and capacity of ADEF to support Sustainable Development Goal 4 was discussed. The idea to create a doctoral network with a focus on teacher education in Africa received the full support of the meeting. The Steering Committee was mandated to explore and develop the idea of a doctoral network in teacher education.

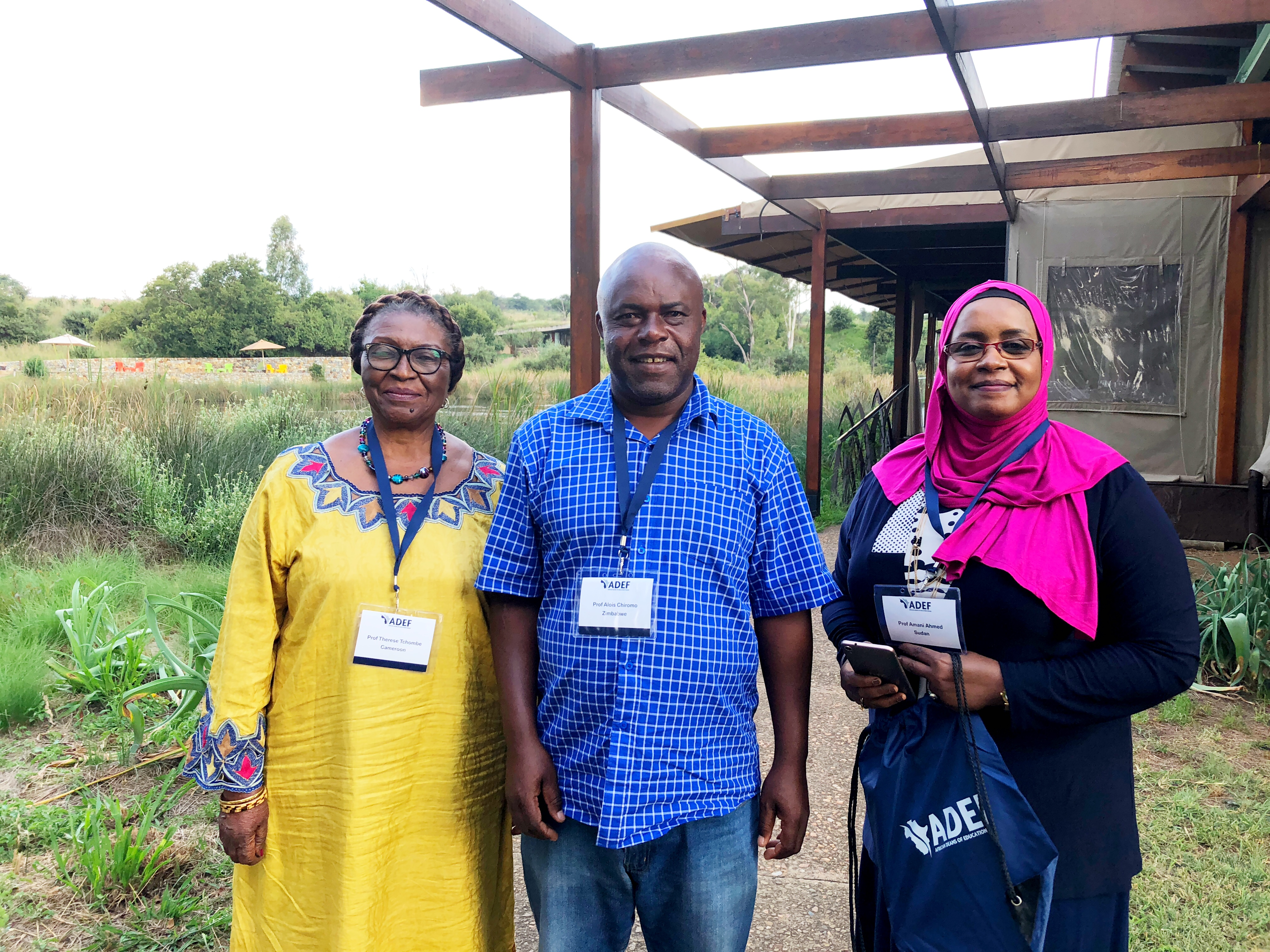
Members of the ADEF Steering Committee in South Africa, February/March 2018: Prof Therese Tchombe (Cameroon), prof Alois S. Chiromo (Zimbabwe), and prof Amani Ibrahim Abdel Gafar (Sudan).

In February 2018 regional representatives from ADEF met at the Cradle of Humankind in South Africa to discuss the potential of a doctoral network in teacher education. The Doctoral Network in Teacher Education in Africa (DNTEA) was conceptualized and the preliminary framework for DNTEA was designed. The founding members of the DNTEA was Irma Eloff (South Africa), Antonio Cipriano Goncalves (Mozambique), Amani Ibrahim Abed Elgafar (Sudan), Therese Tchombe (Cameroon), Alois Chiromo (Zimbabwe) and Hyleen Mariaye (Mauritius).

The founding members of DNTEA were invited to present a symposium at the WERA World Congress World Education Research Association]) in Cape town in August 2018. Subsequently, the group was also invited to present the development of DNTEA at the 11th Policy Dialogue Forum of the International Task Force on Teachers for Education 2030 in Jamaica, November 2018.

Under the leadership of prof Antonio Cipriano Goncalves, ADEF also contributed to discussions on quality education on various global platforms. At KAIROS, a global Working team for the Transformation of Education and Social Sustainability, ADEF contributed to online conferences and working policy documents. KAIROS is "committed to supporting and encouraging the changes that are urgently needed in education, for which we work with the authorities, management teams, researchers, teachers, students, communities and peoples of the world in response to the new challenges that education faces to be effectively a key factor of sustainable development", and predominantly works in the Global South. ADEF also presented at the Africa Federation of Teaching Regulatory Authorities (AFTRA) Conference in Maseru, 13–18 May 2019, speaking to African Ministers of Education about the Sustainable Development Goals

== UNESCO recognition ==
At the third ADEF meeting, participants decided that the ADEF needed to establish a more formal structure to represent all the regions of Africa. After the meeting, Dr Edem Adubra (Head of the Secretariat, International Task Force on Teachers for Education for All (EFA, UNESCO) informed Irma Eloff that the ADEF has been accepted as a recognised member of the UNESCO International Teachers Task Force (Education for All), and to serve as the voice of African deans on the platform. An interim steering committee was initiated with representatives from all the regions of Africa.

At the 8th Policy Dialogue Forum of the Teacher Task Force for Education ADEF presented views on teacher education from Africa. The goal of this Policy Dialogue Forum, which took place in Mexico City in March 2016, was to share policies and practices in teacher education from around the globe. ADEF was represented at the 9th Policy Dialogue Forum in Cambodia by prof Deena Boraie from Egypt and prof Antonio Cipriano Goncalves from Mozambique. At the 10th Policy Dialogue Forum in Lome, Togo, ADEF was represented by Irma Eloff and the initial idea of a doctoral network for teacher education in Africa was shared during informal networking opportunities. A formal presentation on DNTEA (Doctoral Network for Teacher Education in Africa) was made at the 11th Policy Dialogue Forum in Montego Bay, Jamaica in November 2018.
