= Adriaanse =

Adriaanse is a Dutch and Afrikaans surname. Notable people with the surname include:

- Co Adriaanse (born 1947), Dutch footballer and manager
- Jacobie Adriaanse (born 1985), South African rugby union player
- Lourens Adriaanse (born 1988), South African rugby union player
- Wilna Adriaanse (born 1958), South African writer
