= Usdin =

Usdin is a surname. Notable people with the surname include:

- Carly Usdin (born 1982), American director
- Shereen Usdin (born 1962), South African writer
