= Katharine Saunders =

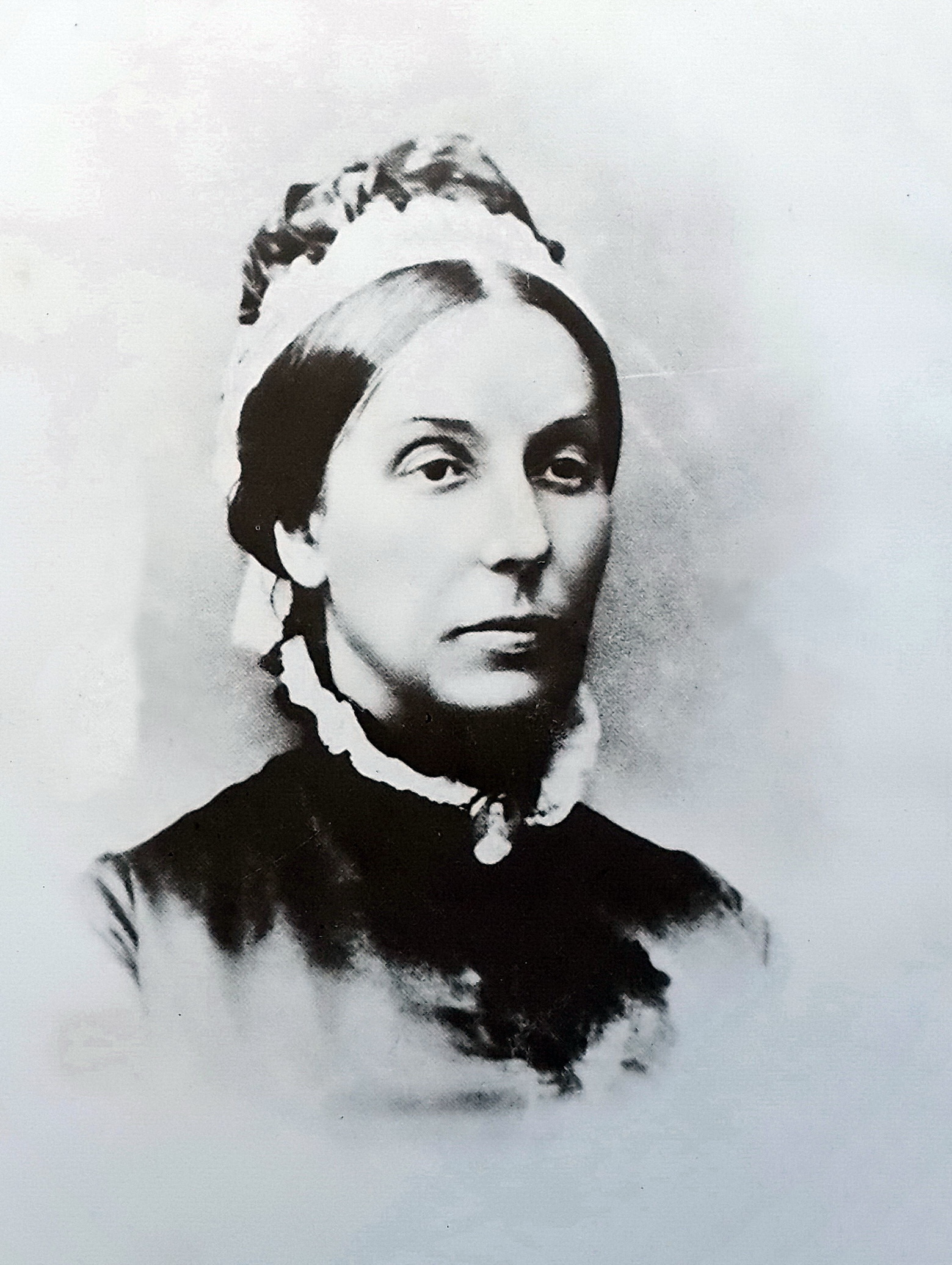
- Born: Katharine Wheelwright; 28 July 1824; Tansor, Northamptonshire
- Died: 23 June 1901 (aged 76); Tongaat (or possibly Durban)
- Known for: Botanical illustrator

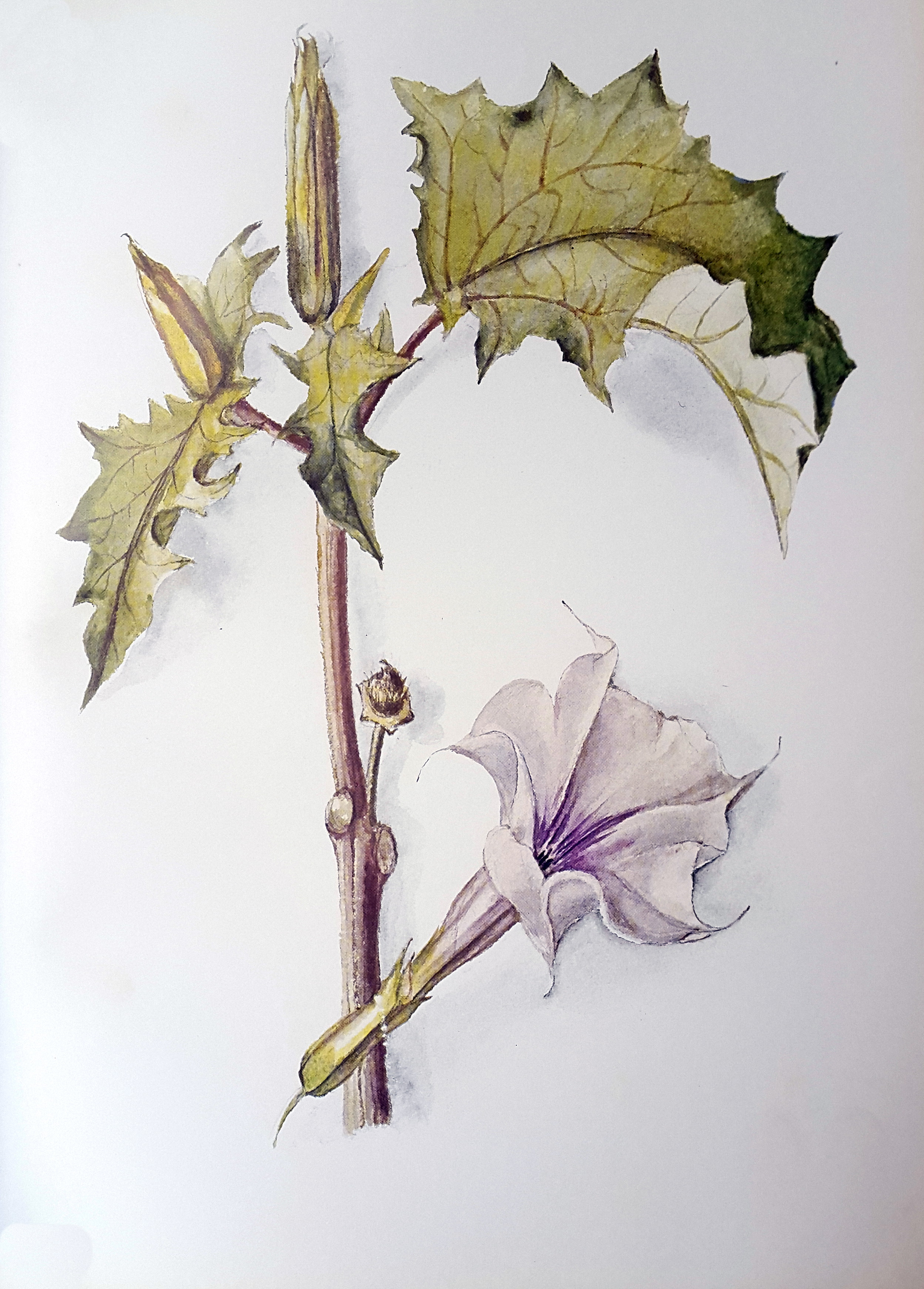
Datura stramonium

Katharine Saunders (1824–1901) was a British-born Colony of Natal botanical illustrator, the sixth of seven children of the Revd Canon Charles Apthorp Wheelwright (Note: Charles Apthorp Wheelwright was the son of Ann Apthorp and Nathaniel Wheelwright, Ann was the daughter of Charles Apthorp) and Anna Hubbard of Tansor, Northamptonshire.

Katharine's father is descended in a direct line from the Plantagenet dynasty, making her a Plantagenet descendant. She grew up in a vast Tudor-style rectory in Tansor. She was coached in music from the age of five and was a competent watercolour painter by the age of six. At the age of 19 she was sent to the Continent to study languages and drawing. Her elder brother Horatio, who was a naturalist, traveller and writer, supported her in this venture. Her older sister, Anna, was already living in Düsseldorf, having been banished in disgrace after falling pregnant. She eked out a living for herself and her child by producing paintings of flowers.

In all Katharine spent seven years abroad, acquiring proficiency in drawing and fluency in French, German and Flemish. During a visit to Düsseldorf she met Mauritian-born James Renault Saunders (1818-1892) and married him the following year at the British Embassy in Brussels.

She and her new husband and their daughter sailed to South Africa in 1854 aboard the East Indiaman 'Hotspur' and arrived in Cape Town on 12 September 1854, spending three weeks there before sailing for Durban where they arrived on 23 October 1854. They settled on the sugarcane farm, 'Tongaat Estate' north of Durban, where her husband was at first manager and later the owner. Having settled in, complete with a grand piano, Katharine started painting plants. The Saunders' first home was a sprawling thatched building with shady verandahs overlooking the Tongaat River and whimsically named 'The House by the Drift'. Her interest in plants was furthered by the Scots horticulturalist, Mark McKen, who worked on the sugarcane farm in a temporary capacity and later resumed his curatorship of the Durban Botanic Gardens. McKen fixed a variety of Natal orchids to trees in her garden, sparking in her a lifelong interest in orchids. By the 1870s her growing family and her husband's thriving career saw them occupying 'Tongaat House' which became a convenient meeting-place for botanists of the area. Katharine's enthusiasm for painting, botany and conservation generated the interest which held the groups together.

The quality of her paintings led inevitably to her sending of live specimens and corresponding with the Hookers at Kew, W. H. Harvey in Dublin and Harry Bolus in Cape Town. On an extended visit to England in 1881/82 she met Joseph Dalton Hooker and William Turner Thiselton-Dyer who would become director of Kew in 1885. On her return to Natal she was visited by Marianne North, the English traveller and botanical artist. Katharine herself travelled and painted fairly extensively through the Transvaal and Swaziland, also visiting her daughter who had settled in Johannesburg and her son, Charles, in Eshowe. She donated a selection of her paintings to the Natal Museum in Pietermaritzburg in 1889. About 700 of her paintings have survived, some are to be found in the Tongaat Group Library. Her pressed specimens are at Kew and the herbarium of Trinity College, Dublin.

Katharine Saunders sent some 426 specimens to Kew during the period 1881 to 1889 - about 16 of these were named after her though most were later regarded as synonyms. Amongst these were Schrebera saundersiae Harv., Habenaria saundersiae Harv., Drimiopsis saundersiae Baker, Sisyranthus saundersiae N.E. Br., Dermatobotrys saundersii Bolus and Haemanthus katharinae Baker.

== Notes and references ==
- Gunn, Mary; Codd, L. E. W. (1981). Botanical Exploration Southern Africa. Cape Town: A. A. Balkema. ISBN 978-0-86961-129-6.
- Creese, Mary R. S.; Creese, Thomas M. (2010). Ladies in the Laboratory III: South African, Australian, New Zealand, and Canadian Women in Science: Nineteenth and Early Twentieth Centuries. Scarecrow Press. ISBN 978-0-8108-7289-9.

== Gallery ==
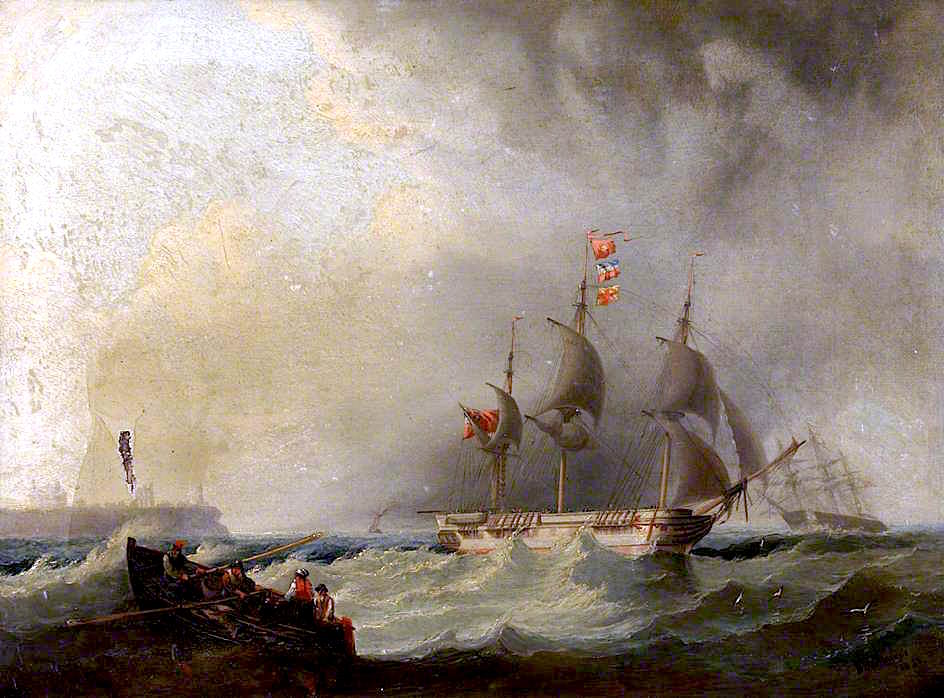
The East Indiaman 'Hotspur' on which the Saunders family sailed

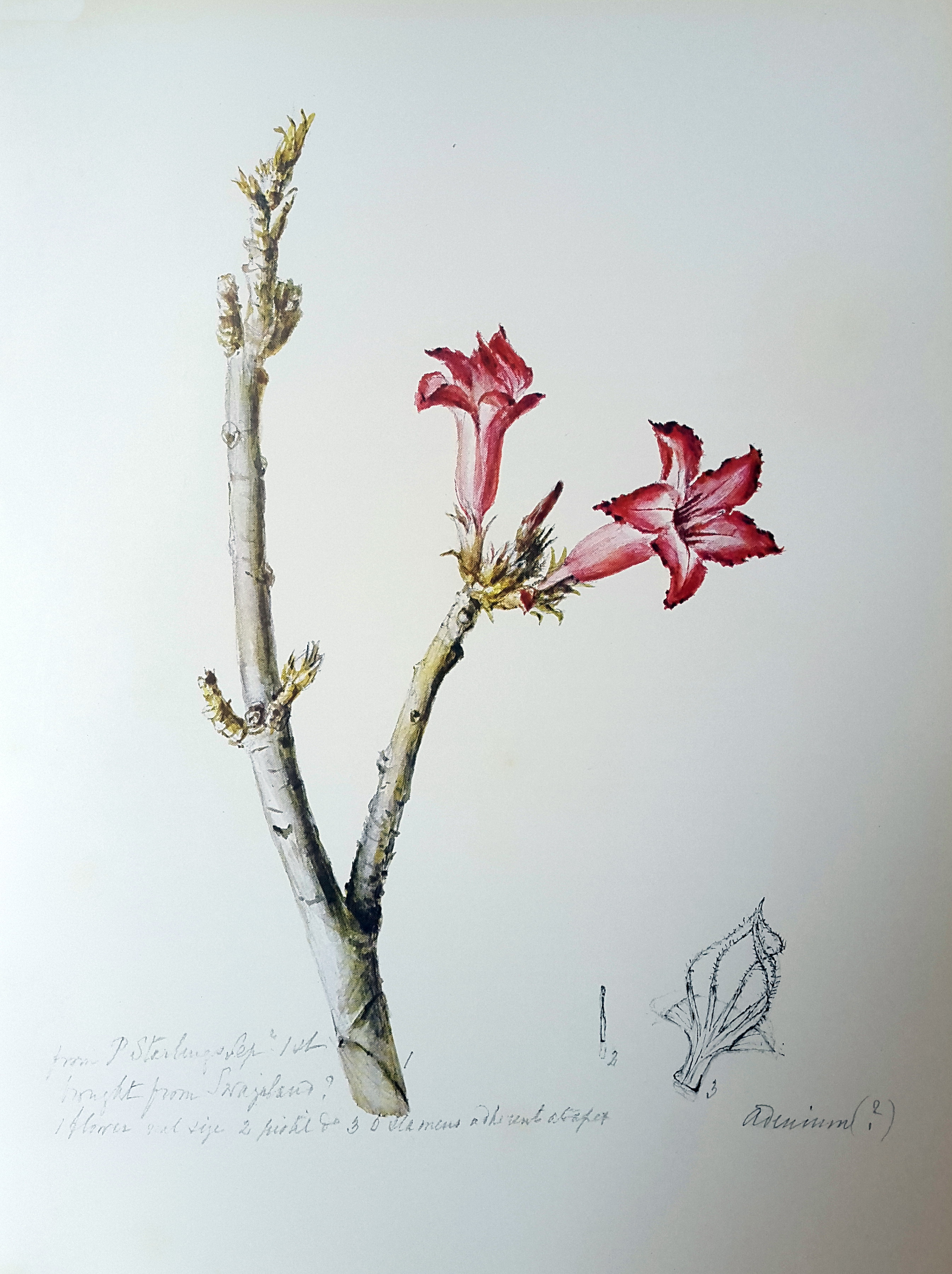
Adenium obesum

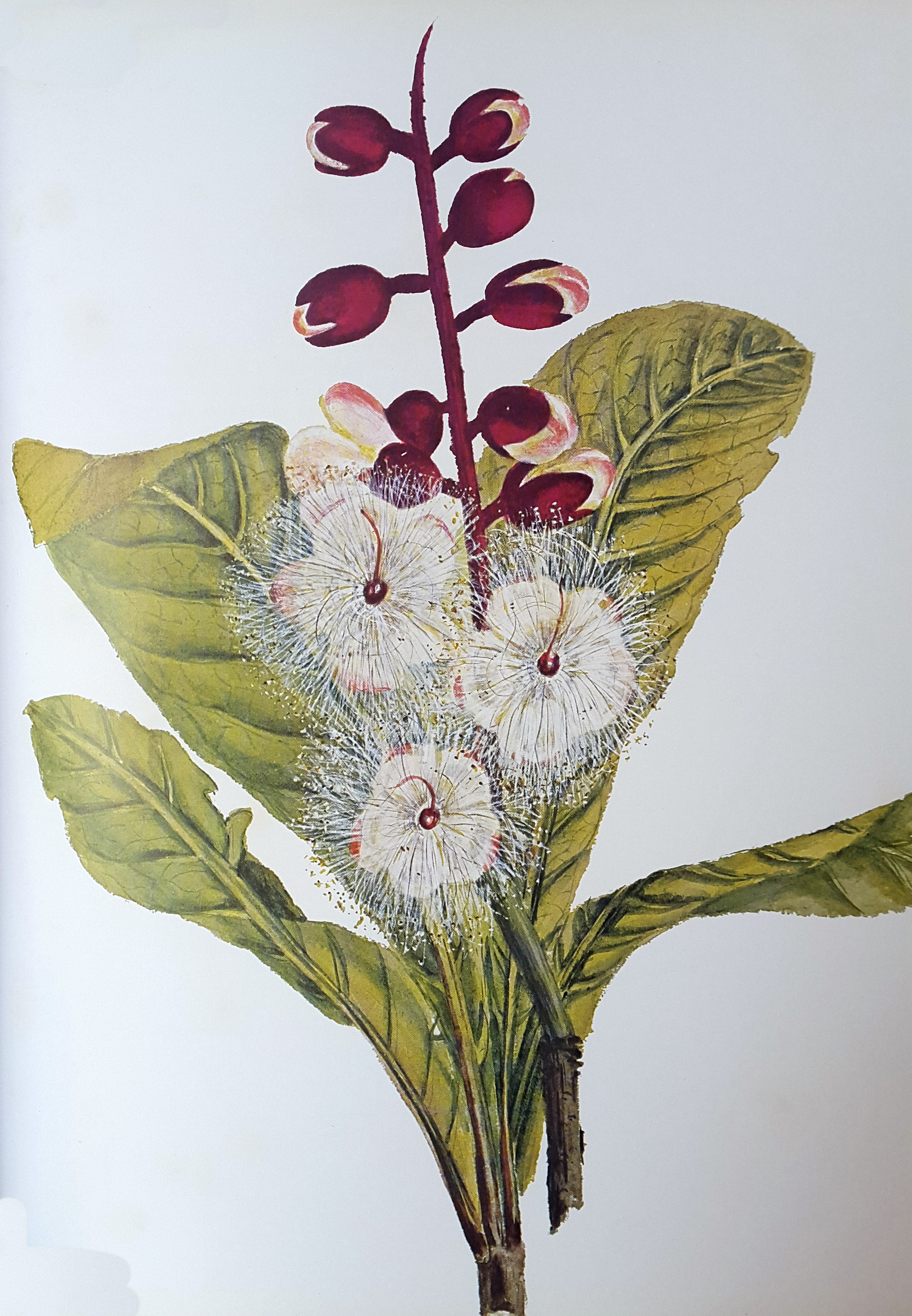
Barringtonia racemosa

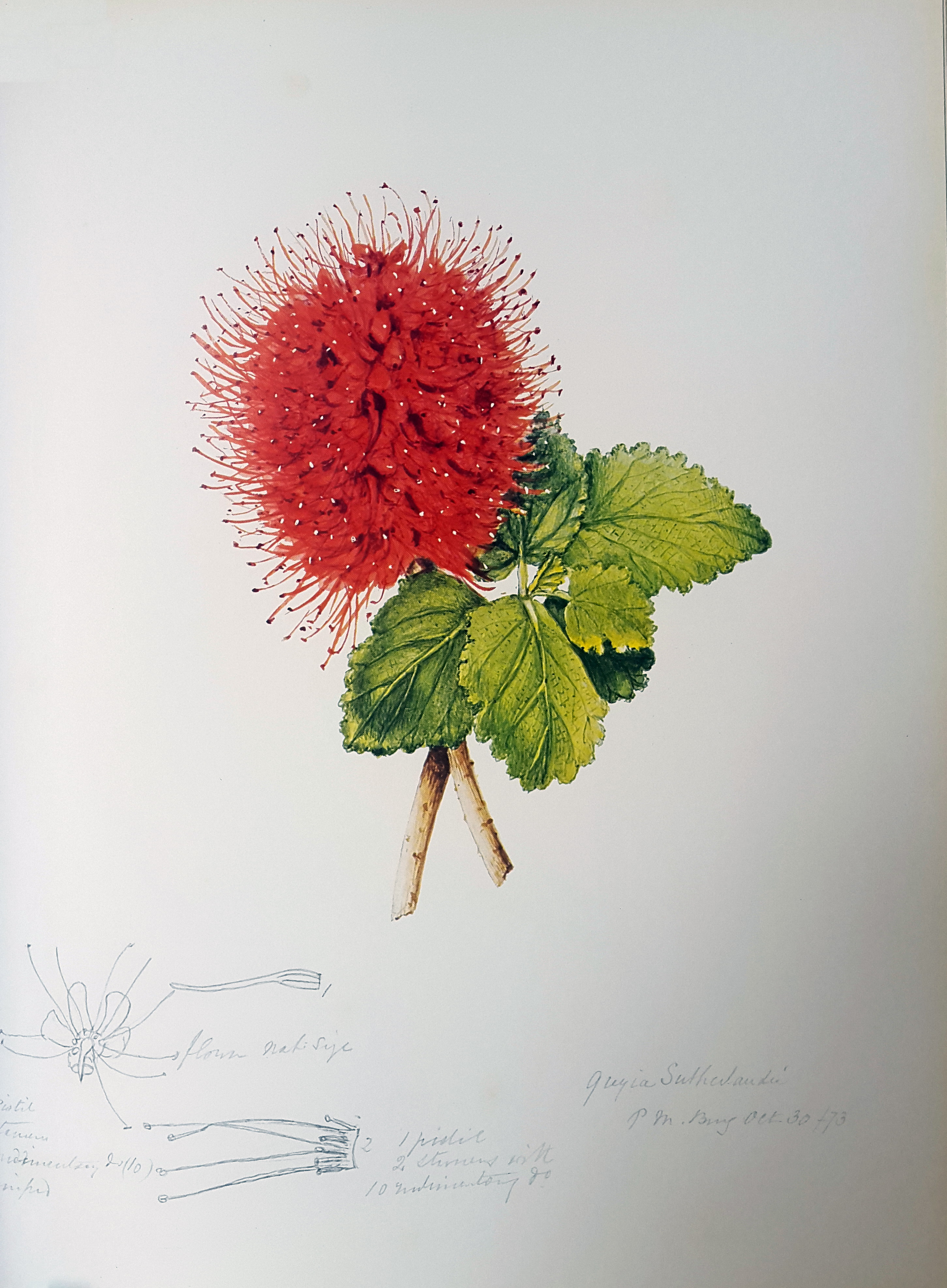
Greyia sutherlandii

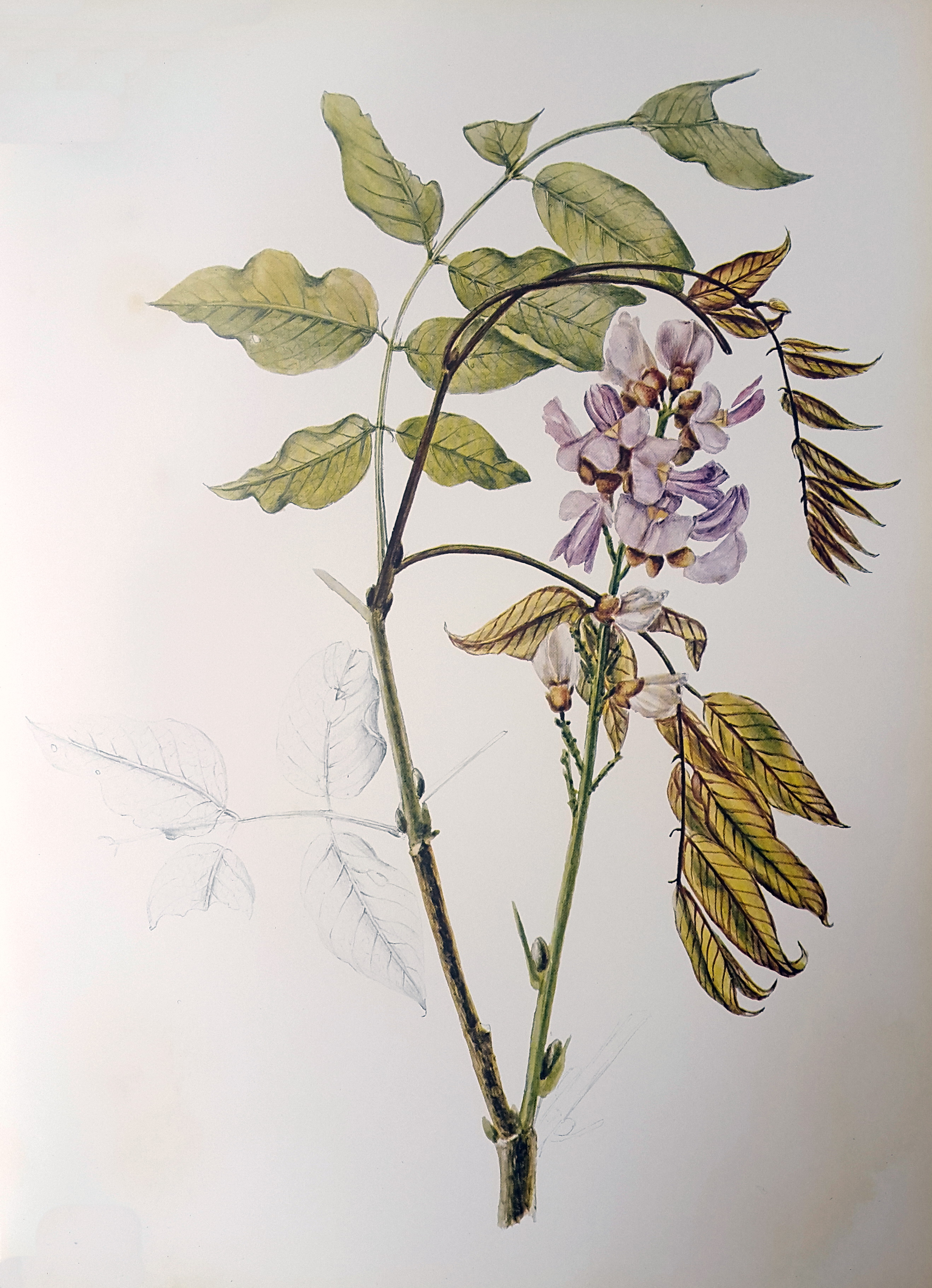
Millettia grandis
