= Tirza (disambiguation) =

Tirza is a 2010 Dutch drama film and a character in it.

Tirza may also refer to:

- Tirza Stream, stream in West Bank
- 267 Tirza, main belt asteroid
- Tirza Parish, Latvia
- Tirza Porat, victim of the Beita incident
- Tirza, character in opera Jephtas Gelübde

== See also ==
- Tirzah (disambiguation)
- Thyrza (disambiguation)
- Tirtza Atar (1941-1977), Israeli poet, songwriter, playwright
- Thirza
