= Carmel Schrire =

Archaeologist and anthropologist

- Born: 15 May 1941 (age 85); Cape Town, South Africa
- Education: University of Cape Town, University of Cambridge, Australian National University
- Scientific career
- Fields: Anthropology
- Workplaces: Rutgers University

Carmel Schrire (born 15 May 1941) is a professor of anthropology at Rutgers University whose research focuses on historical archaeology, particularly in South Africa and Europe.

== Education and research ==
Schrire was born in Cape Town, South Africa and completed her undergraduate studies at the University of Cape Town (BA, 1960), going on to attend the University of Cambridge (BA (Hons.), MA, 1965). Her early research interests were in prehistoric archaeology, and she did her doctoral research in Australia's Northern Territory on the way in which modern Aboriginal behaviour can help interpret prehistoric remains. She received her PhD in 1968 from the Australian National University.

In 1984 she initiated a program in the historical archaeology of European contact and settlement at the Cape region in South Africa. Her 1995 book Digging through Darkness: Chronicles of an Archaeologist explores the dehumanizing effects of colonialism and racism on both colonized and colonizer. In 2004, she excavated the house of the "Last Jew of Auschwitz" in Oświęcim, Poland.

== Publications ==
=== Journals ===
- "Oakhurst: A Re-Examination and Vindication" (1962)
- "A Matter of Life and Death: An Investigation into the Practice of Female Infanticide in the Arctic" (1974) (with William Lee Steigner, Man: the Journal of the Royal Anthropological Society 9:162)
- "An Inquiry into the Evolutionary Status and Apparent Identity of San Hunter-Gatherers" (1980) (Human Ecology 8:1)
- "An Analysis of Human Behaviour and Animal Extinctions in South Africa and Australia in Late Pleistocene Times" (1980)
- "Hunter-Gatherers in Africa" (1980)
- "The Alligator Rivers: Prehistory and Ecology in Western Arnhem Land" (1982)
- "Burkitt's Milestone" (1986) (with Janette Deacon)
- "Past and Present in Hunter Gatherer Studies" (1986)
- "The Indigenous Artefacts from Oudepost I, a Colonial Outpost of the VOC at Saldanha Bay, Cape (1989) (with Janette Deacon)
- "The Chronology of Oudepost I, Cape, as Inferred from an Analysis of Clay Pipes" (1990)
- "Excavating Archives at Oudepost I, Cape" (1990)
- "Reply to Wilson, van Rijssen, Jacobson and Noli" (1990)
- "The Beads from Oudepost I, a Dutch East India Company Outpost, Cape, South Africa" (1991)
- "Is the Penn Mightier than the Shovel?: A Sally to a Riposte" (1991)
- "Analysis of Faunal Remains from Oudepost I, an Early Outpost of the Dutch East India Company, Cape Province" (1991)
- "The Archaeological Identity of Hunters and Herders at the Cape over the last 2000 Years: A Critique" (1992)
- "Coins, Gaming Counters and a Bale Seal from Oudepost, Cape" (1992)
- "Cheap Shots, Long Shots and a River in Egypt: A Reply to Whitelaw et al." (1992)
- "The Site History of the Historical Site at Oudepost I, Cape" (1993)
- "An Historic Skeleton from the Slave Lodge at Vergelegen" (1993)
- "The Historical Archaeology of Vergelegen, an Early Farmstead at the Cape of Good Hope" (1995)
- "Beyond Lifetime Averages: Tracing Life Histories Through Isotopic Analysis of Different Calcified Tissues from Archaeological Human Skeletons" (1995) (with Judith Sealy and Richard Armstrong)
- "Petrography of Locally Produced Pottery from the Dutch Colonial Cape of Good Hope, South Africa" (1999) (with S. C. Jordan and D. Miller)
- "Stable Carbon and Nitrogen Isotopic Analysis of the Underclass at the Colonial Cape of Good Hope in the Eighteenth and Nineteenth Centuries" (2001) (with Glenda Cox and Judith Sealy)
- "The Conciliators: Bushmania and the Nightmare of Survival" (2003)
- "Reply to Morris et al.'s Critique of the Review by Carmel Schrire of Julia Martin's A Millimetre of Dust: Visiting Ancestral Sites" (2010)
- "Hilary John Deacon: Archaeologist (1936-2010)" (2010)

=== Books ===
- Digging through Darkness: Chronicles of an Archaeologist (1995)
- Tigers in Africa: Stalking the Past at the Cape of Good Hope (2002)
