= Toni Stuart =

South African poet

- Born: 21 January 1983 (age 43); Cape Town, South Africa
- Education: Cape Peninsula University of Technology
- Occupations: Writer, poet, performer
- Writing career
- Language: English, Afrikaans

Toni Stuart (born 21 January 1983) is a South African poet best known for her poetry writing and performances. She has stated that she aims to encourage others to find their own voice by offering inspirational creative workshops.

== Early life ==
Stuart started writing poetry from the age of 15. She grew up in Athlone, a suburb of Cape Town. Even from a young age her work has shown a consistent interest in dealing with issues of social inequality. After finishing high school, she studied Journalism at CPUT from 2001 until 2003.

In 2002 she was one of a chosen few to take part in the African/European Relations exchange programme with Fonty's Hogescholen Joernalistiek in Tilburg, The Netherlands. Initially, Toni worked as a journalist and as a developer of the youth in the NGO sector. She now follows her passion for poetry full-time.

== Influences ==
Toni Stuart is inspired by poets, such as Janet E. Aalfs, Audre Lorde, Anis Mojgani, Jacob Sam-La Rose, Gabeba Baderoon, Antjie Krog, Lemn Sissay, Kelwyn Sole, Rustum Kozain, D'bi Young, Diana Ferrus, and Mary Oliver. She gains musical encouragement from musicians by the likes of John Mayer, Miles Davis, Kyle Shepherd, Arvo Pärt, Jenni Thompson, Gregory Porter, Damien Rice, Rachmaninov. Toni further gains inspiration from visual artists such as Burning Museum, Ernestine White, Firdous Hendricks, Anthony Gormley, and Shantell Martin. Her female role-models are Malika Ndlovu, Tina Schouw, and Shelley Barry.

== Achievements ==
Toni Stuart is also known as a workshop facilitator. She has worked with a number of schools, NGOs and the Institute for Justice and Reconciliation.

== Bibliography ==
=== Anthologies ===
Stuart's work has been published by STE Publishers, Jacana Media, Quickfox Publishing, Africa Sun Press and Deep South Publishing.

- Looking Back, Going Forward: Young Voices on Freedom (British Council, STE Publishers, 2004)
- The Ground's Ear (QuickFox Publishing, 2011)
- The Sol Plaatje EU Poetry Prize Anthology (Jacana Media, 2013)
- In the Heat of Shadows, South African Poetry 1996–2013 (Deep South Publishing, 2014)
- The McGregor Poetry Festival Anthology 2013 (Africa Sun Press, 2013)

=== Non-fiction ===
- The Agenda Journal on Teenage Fertility and Desire (Unisa Press and Routledge, 2011)
- Facing Feelings in Faith Communities, William Kondrath (Alban, 2013)

=== Workshops ===
- The Silence that Words Come From
- Arts Aweh Ambassadors

=== Poetry ===
- Innocent Wisdom
- Ma ek ko huis toe
