= To Tirzah =

Poem by William Blake

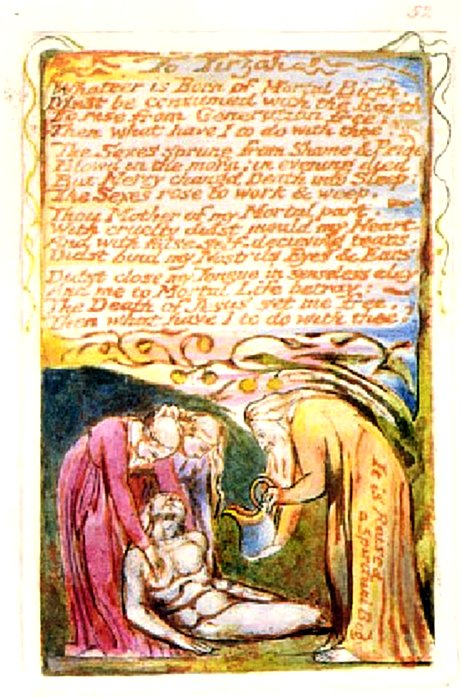
"To Tirzah", in the Cambridge copy of the Songs of Experience

"To Tirzah" is a poem by William Blake that was published in his collection Songs of Innocence and of Experience. It is often described as the most difficult of the poems because it refers to an oblique character called "Tirzah", whose identity is not directly stated. It is a Hebrew name that appears in the Torah, meaning "she is my delight". According to Northrop Frye, Blake identified the name Tirzah with worldliness, because the name appears in the Bible to refer to both a rebellious town and to one of the Daughters of Zelophehad. The latter story was about female inheritance rights which were linked to restrictions on marriage and the maintenance of tribal boundaries.

Tirzah symbolises human dependence on worldly sense-experience. The poem presents a contrast between the attractive pull of the five senses toward the finite world of "generation" and the opposing impulse toward the infinite spiritual realm that lies beyond physical experience. The physical senses numb direct spiritual perception, as in Blake's aphorism from The Marriage of Heaven and Hell: "If the doors of perception were cleansed, everything would appear to Man as it is: infinite." The seductive attraction to the delight in sense experience is, from the point of view of the spirit which seeks its freedom in the infinitude, experienced as betrayal. Blake therefore took the name Tirzah to be a symbolic reference to worldly materialism, as opposed to the spiritual realm of Jerusalem.

Particularly striking is the line "Didst close my tongue in senseless clay", which seems to imply that the authority of the artist's voice in Blake's view is that it has been freed from the prison of physicality and therefore comes from beyond this world. When the artist, who is by definition spiritually free, speaks with his tongue, the words that naturally emerge connote infinity.

Blake's illustration to the poem depicts two women supporting a naked semi-supine male figure who appears to be unconscious or dead. An elderly man prepares to pour liquid from a jug over the figure. On the elderly man's clothing the words "it is raised a spiritual body" (1 Corinthians 15:44) are written.

== Text ==
Whate'er is born of mortal birth
Must be consumèd with the earth,
To rise from generation free:
Then what have I to do with thee?

The sexes sprung from shame and pride,
Blowed in the morn, in evening died;
But mercy changed death into sleep;
The sexes rose to work and weep.

Thou, mother of my mortal part,
With cruelty didst mould my heart,
And with false self-deceiving tears
Didst bind my nostrils, eyes, and ears,

Didst close my tongue in senseless clay,
And me to mortal life betray.
The death of Jesus set me free:
Then what have I to do with thee?

== References in the culture ==
- Based on this poem, Mexican composer Arturo Meza composed "A Tirzá", which was recorded for his 1984 album En El Monte de los Equinoccios.
- In the 1997 Blade Runner video game, Clovis cites the first stanza in the scene of killing of the rogue cop Lt. Edison Guzza.
- This poem is referenced as an epigraph in Chapter III of 'Drive Your Plow Over the Bones of the Dead' by Polish author Olga Tokarczuk.
