= Thandeka Zulu =

South African Actress and Musician

- Thandeka Zulu at Casuarina Beach, near oThongathi.

Background information
- Birth name: Thandeka Zulu
- Born: 25 November 1991 (age 33)
- Origin: oThongathi, South Africa,
- Genres: Afro-pop
- Occupation(s): singer, songwriter, actress
- Instrument(s): Vocals, a cappella
- Years active: 2012–present

Thandeka Zulu (born 25 November 1991) is a Zulu South African actress and musician known for her role as Nombuso in the South African telenovela Uzalo . She appeared in a film called Kwaito Church Service 2 and also portrayed pearl on e.tv drama series The girl is mine.

== Early life and education ==
Thandeka grew up singing and dancing in a small township in oThongathi, KwaZulu-Natal named Hambanathi. She schooled at Nkosibomvu Secondary School in oThongathi where she matriculated.

== Career ==
In 2012, she joined a Durban-based music group called Afrosoul which was formed in the year 2000. After her debut in AfroSoul, Thandeka appeared in a film Kwaito Church Service 2 (2013) also played Pearl on eTV drama series The girl is mine. She made a major impact in South Africa with the portrayal of Nombuso in the South African telenovela Uzalo. Thandeka Zulu(Played Nombuso) was accused of having a bad attitude at work and was fired from Uzalo.
