= OThongathi =

oThongathi Tongaat
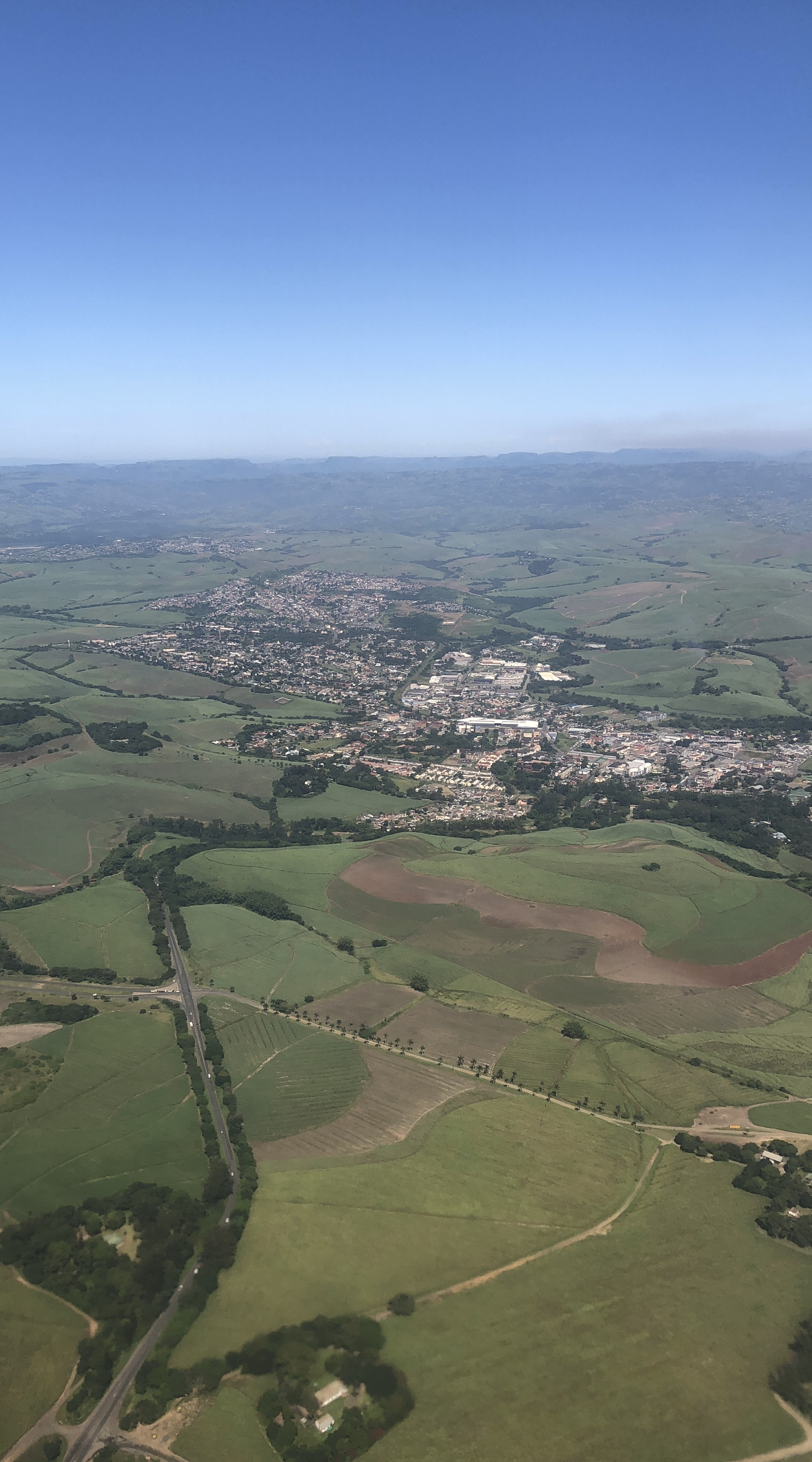
- Aerial view of oThongathi

- Location within KwaZulu-Natal Location within South Africa
- Coordinates: 29°34′00″S 31°07′00″E
- Country: South Africa
- Province: KwaZulu-Natal
- Municipality: eThekwini

Area
  - Total: 11.72 km^{2} (4.53 sq mi)

Population (2011)
  - Total: 42,554
  - Density: 3,631/km^{2} (9,404/sq mi)

Racial makeup (2011)
  - Black African: 41.1%
  - Coloured: 1.2%
  - Indian/Asian: 56.7%
  - White: 0.4%
  - Other: 0.5%

First languages (2011)
  - English: 59.3%
  - Zulu: 32.3%
  - Xhosa: 3.6%
  - S. Ndebele: 1.0%
  - Other: 3.8%
- Time zone: UTC+2 (SAST)
- Postal code (street): 4399
- PO box: 4400
- Area code: 032

oThongathi, previously and still commonly known as Tongaat, is a town in KwaZulu-Natal, South Africa, about 40 kilometres (25 mi) north of Durban and 28 kilometres (17 mi) south of KwaDukuza. It now forms part of eThekwini Metropolitan Municipality, or the Greater Durban area. The area is home to the oldest Indian community in South Africa, having been where the first indentured Indian laborers settled in 1860 to work in the sugar-cane plantations. Much of the architectural style in the town was the work of Ivan Mitford-Barberton, and many buildings are in the Cape Dutch style of architecture.

Prior to 1 December 2023, vehicle registration plates in oThongathi started with NJ - N for Natal. It is still unknown exactly what the J stands for as this vehicle registration code also covered Verulam, Inanda and Ntuzuma.

== History ==
oThongathi was established as Tongaat in 1945 and its name was taken from the name of the uThongathi River which passes by the town: The name of the river, derived from Zulu, is said to mean

'it is important to us' or 'you are important because of us', referring to legends involving reaction to a denigrating remark in the first instance, and to Shaka's magnanimous view of a tribe he had just made subservient to him

In 2017 plans were made for the restoration of the historic railway station building.

On 3 June 2024, a large tornado struck the town, uprooting trees, damaging vehicles, and causing multiple homes to collapse in the Magwaveni and Sandfields neighborhoods. At least 11 people were killed and at least 55 others were injured.

== Law and government ==
=== Municipal re-demarcation ===
As the 2024 national government elections near, there have recently been several demarcation proposals made by the Municipal Demarcation Board (MDB) to relocate Wards 58, 61 and 62 of the eThekwini Metropolitan Municipality which includes oThongathi to be relocated to the neighbouring KwaDukuza and Ndwedwe local municipalities in the iLembe District Municipality. Wards 58 and 62 would be relocated to KwaDukuza and Ward 61 would be relocated to Ndwedwe.

It has also been highlighted that the relocation of Ward 61 to Ndwedwe is in a bid to stimulate economic activity in Ndwedwe, a largely rural municipality with high levels of unemployment and little economic and social development. The reason for the relocation was also attributed to the fact that oThongathi serves as the nearest urban service centre to the Ndwedwe area. A final decision on the demarcation proposals is yet to made as several objections and concerns have been raised over the negative economic impact it could have on eThekwini.

=== Name change ===
In November 2009, the eThekwini Metropolitan Municipality submitted a list of places in the municipality to the KwaZulu-Natal Provincial Geographic Names Committee to be changed from their anglicised names to the correct Zulu spelling. In the list, the town Tongaat was to be changed to "oThongathi" and the Tongaat River was to be changed to "uThongathi River". On 1 October 2010, the KwaZulu-Natal Department of Arts and Culture gazette the list of approved name changes which included the town of Tongaat and the Tongaat River.

Ever since the name change, the South African National Roads Agency Ltd. (SANRAL) has changed the road signs on the N2 leading to and at the uShukela Drive interchange (Exit 202) just outside oThongathi, however there are still several road signs that still remain with the name "Tongaat" and many Durbanites and residents of oThongathi still refer to it by its previous name.

== Geography ==
oThongathi is nestled among rolling hills dominated by sugarcane fields, just inland from the coast and primarily located south of the uThongathi River. Neighbouring settlements include Westbrook (7 km) to the west, Verulam (13 km) to the south, Ballito (16 km) to the north-west and eMdloti (16 km) to the south-west.

=== Suburban areas ===
The 2011 census divided the urban area of Tongaat (now oThongathi) into 14 "sub places" including:

- Belvedere (Residential)
- Buffelsdale (Residential)
- Burbreeze (Residential)
- Fairbreeze (Residential)
- Flamingo Heights (Residential)
- Gandhi's Hill (Residential)
- Mitchell Village (Residential)
- Mithangar (Residential)
- Newton (Residential)
- Sandfields (Residential)
- Tongaat Industrial (Industrial)
- Trurolands (Industrial)
- Vanrova (Residential)
- Watsonia (Residential)

== Economy ==
=== Industries ===
oThongathi is home to Tongaat Hulett, one of the largest sugar producers in Africa which has its headquarters located just outside the town. The company also owns and operates the Maidstone Sugar Mill situated on the north banks of the uThongathi River and is one of South Africa's first sugar mills – completed in 1850.

=== Retail ===
Gopalall Hurbans Road forms the main thoroughfare through the oThongathi CBD, lined by a number of local retailers, shops, restaurants and other businesses. The main shopping centre, oThongathi Mall, which once collapsed in 2013 during construction, was reconstructed in the same plot of land on the main road as previously and was opened to the public in March 2023.

== Culture & Religion ==
oThongathi is home to numerous cultural and religious organisations and buildings. These include:

- Brake Village Sri Siva Soobramaniar Alayam
- Shree Veeraboga Emperumal Temple
- Chinna Thirupathi Venkataswara Devasthanam

== Infrastructure ==
As a regional service centre, oThongathi is fairly well served in terms of public infrastructure with amenities such as a town hall, police station, library, sports centre and a regional branch of the Department of Home Affairs.

=== Healthcare ===
==== Private healthcare ====
Mediclinic Victoria was established in 1970 as Victoria Hospital and later acquired by its current owner, Mediclinic International in 2003. It is a private hospital operating 24-hour emergency services and is located in the heart of the town just off Ushukela Drive (Watson Highway).

==== Public healthcare ====
The Tongaat Community Health Centre is the main public health facility serving oThongathi and neighbouring communities in the iLembe District Municipality such as Ballito, Shakaskraal and Ndwedwe. Hambanathi Clinic, operating as a municipal clinic under the eThekwini Metropolitan Municipality, serves the adjoining township of Hambanathi.

=== Transport ===
==== Air ====
King Shaka International Airport is the nearest airport to oThongathi, located approximately 8 km south-east of the town via the R102 and M65. The airport offers several flights to towns and cities domestically in South Africa as well as internationally to Doha, Dubai, Harare, Lusaka, Manzini and Istanbul.

==== Rail ====
The main Metrorail commuter route, known as the North Coast Line, runs between Durban in the south-east (via Verulam) and KwaDukuza in the north-east (via Shakaskraal) with three stations in oThongathi: Tongaat, Tongaat Central and Flamingo Heights.

==== Roads ====
oThongathi is situated 3 kilometres off the N2 freeway between KwaDukuza and Durban. The town is also served by regional routes, including the R102, Gopalall Hurbans Road, which runs through oThongathi, connecting Umhlali to Verulam and the R614, which links to Wartburg in the north-west. Additionally, the M43, Ushukela Drive, heads south-east toward the coast, connecting oThongathi to Westbrook and providing access to the N2.

===== Tolling =====
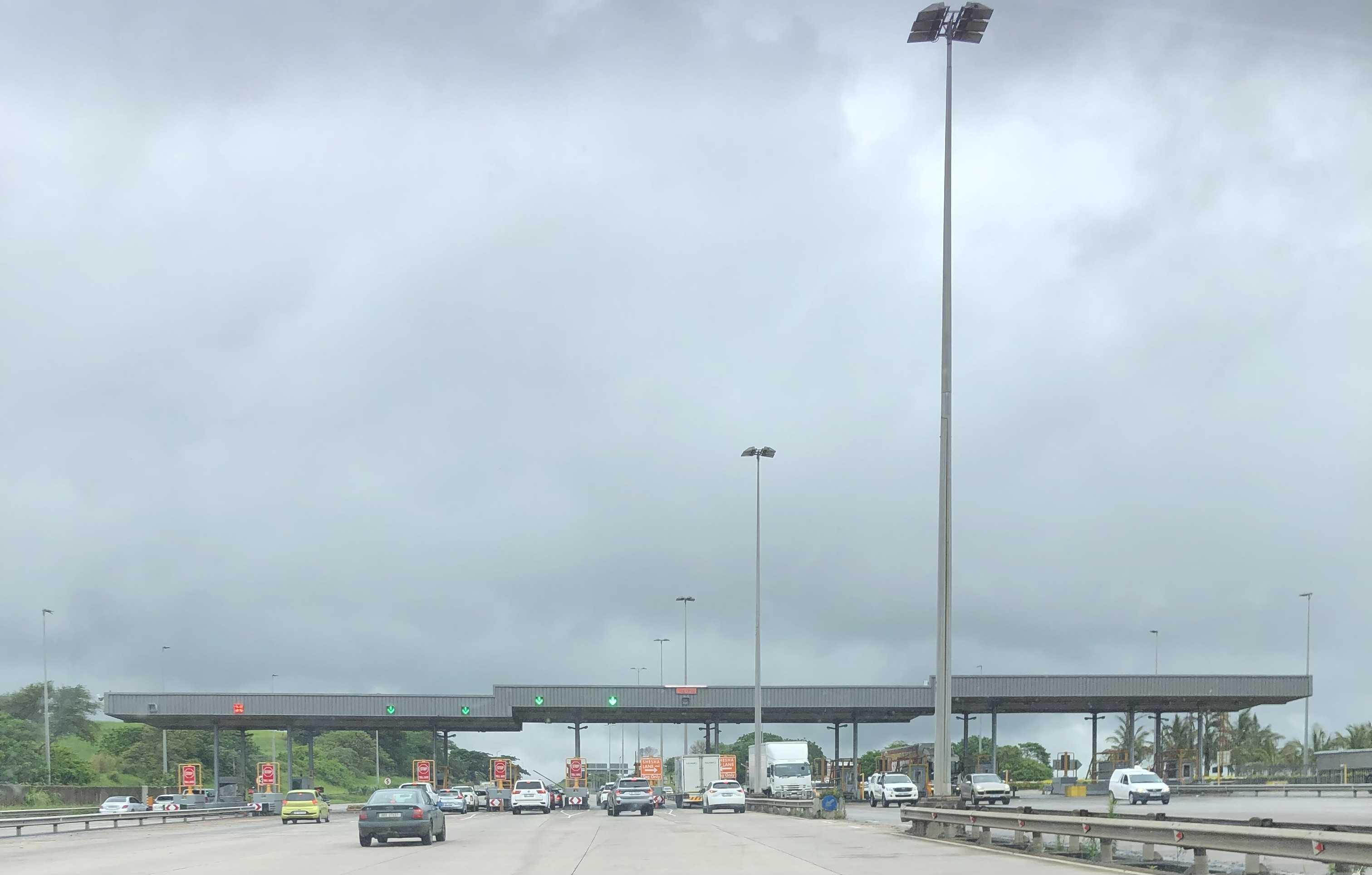
The mainline of the oThongathi Toll Plaza, situated on the N2 just outside oThongathi

The N2, known as the North Coast Toll Road, involves payment of a toll: The N2 N (to KwaDukuza) and N2 S (to Durban) must pass through the mainline of the oThongathi Toll Plaza at the Ushukela Drive interchange (exit 202). Traffic arriving in oThongathi from the south to turn off at exit 202 and traffic joining the N2 S from Ushukela Drive must pass the toll booths situated on the respective on and off-ramps, known as the oThongathi Ramp Toll Plaza(s). The R102 to Umhlali and Verulam and the M4 (from Westbrook) to Ballito and uMhlanga serve as untolled alternative routes.

== Water crisis ==
In April 2022, floods caused by abnormal heavy rainfall struck the Greater Durban region and one of the worst affected places in the region was oThongathi. The oThongathi Waterworks Treatment Plant's poorly maintained infrastructure was exacerbated by the floods which caused extensive damage to the oThongathi Waterworks Treatment Plant leaving many residents without water supply.

Although water tankers had been sent to oThongathi, they were reported to inconsistent further sparking protests around oThongathi even in the neighbouring township of Hambanathi where it was reported that even waterborne diseases began to flourish.

Towards the end of August 2022, Water and Sanitation Minister, Senzo Mchunu announced that there would be a tie-in to the Mamba Ridge pipe that will assist to supply water from the Hazelmere Dam, near Verulam to oThongathi.

After more than 200 days of water shortages, towards mid-November 2022, the oThongathi Waterworks Treatment Plant was fully repaired, and water supply was to implemented into phases to complete the commissioning of the oThongathi Water Works with the southern areas of oThongathi receiving water supply first before other areas.

== Notable people ==
- Ahmed Amla, cricketer
- Ansuyah Ratipul Singh, medical doctor and writer is commemorated with a statue in the Amanzinyama Gardens located at 29°34′13″S 31°07′23″E.
- Cecil Pullan, cricketer
- Colin Munro, cricketer
- Hashim Amla, cricketer
- Katharine Saunders, botanical illustrator
- Kimeshan Naidoo, entrepreneur and engineer
- Prenelan Subrayen, cricketer
- Quarraisha Abdool Karim, scientist was born here in 1960.
- Thandeka Zulu, actress and musician
- Thomas Hassall, Australian politician
- Two-Boys Gumede, footballer

== Notes and references ==
=== Sources ===
- Chalmin, Philippe (1990). The Making of a Sugar Giant: Tate and Lyle, 1859-1989. Taylor & Francis. ISBN 978-3-7186-0434-0.
- Harrison, Philip (2004). South Africa's Top Sites: Spiritual. New Africa Books. ISBN 978-0-86486-564-9.
- Oppenheimer, Gerald M.; Bayer, Ronald (2007). Shattered Dreams: An Oral History of the South African AIDS Epidemic. Oxford University Press, USA. ISBN 978-0-19-530730-6.
- Raper, P. E. (1989). Dictionary of Southern African Place Names. J. Ball. ISBN 978-0-947464-04-2.
- Watson, Robert George Theodor (1960). Tongaati: An African Experiment. Hutchinson.

=== Further reading ===
- Hale, Emiline (1928). The thrills of Tiny Tongaat. Religious Tract Society.
- Reddy, E (1977). Religion and Rituals Amongst Hindus in Tongaat. University of Durban-Westville, Department of Anthropology.
- Petraglia, Michael D.; de la Peña, Paloma; Wadley, Lyn (2017). "Technological variability at Sibudu Cave: The end of Howiesons Poort and reduced mobility strategies after 62,000 years ago". PLOS ONE. 12 (10) e0185845. Bibcode:2017PLoSO..1285845D. doi:10.1371/journal.pone.0185845. ISSN 1932-6203. PMC 5628897. PMID 28982148.
