= Tirzah =

Tirzah may refer to:

== People ==
- Tirzah (Biblical name), Biblical woman
- Tirzah Firestone (born 1954), American rabbi
- Tirzah Garwood, English painter
- Tirzah Joy Huerta Uecke, or Joy Huerta (born 1986), Mexican singer
- Tirzah (musician), an English singer

=== Fictional people ===
- Tirzah (character) in the novel Ben-Hur: A Tale of the Christ
- Tirzah, the main character in Sara Douglass's novel Threshold.
- Tirzah is one of the names of the character "Angel" in Francine Rivers's book Redeeming Love.
- In "Giants in the Earth," by Esther Friesner in Turn the Other Chick, Tirzah is a concubine of King David who becomes one of the series' titular sword-wielding "chicks."
- Tirzah Vame in Ward Moore's 1953 novel Bring the Jubilee.

== Places ==
- Mount Tirzah, North Carolina
- Tirzah (ancient city), West Bank
- Tirzah, South Carolina, a city of South Carolina
- Tirzah Stream, West Bank

== Other ==
- 267 Tirza, minor planet

== See also ==
- Tirza (disambiguation)
- Thirza
- Thyrza (disambiguation)
- Tirtza Atar (1941-1977), Israeli poet, songwriter, playwright
