= Ansuyah Ratipul Singh =

South African medical doctor and writer

Ansuyah Ratipul Singh (12 June 1917 – 27 November 1978) was a South African medical doctor and writer.

== Early life and education ==
Ansuyah Ratipul Singh was born in Durban, the daughter of Chatrapul Ratipul Singh, an accountant, and Latchmee Singh. She attended the Durban Indian Girls' School. For medical school she went to the University of Edinburgh in 1936. She finished her degree in 1944, and returned to South Africa two years later. Later, in 1962, she also earned a diploma in Public Health from the University of Natal.

== Career ==
Singh opened a private practice in Durban. In time she worked at the University of Natal Medical School, specializing in family medicine, obstetrics, and gynaecology. She was also on staff at the Clairwood Hospital. She took charge of the obstetric clinic at King Edward VIII Hospital in 1959. She founded a series of clinics to serve poor patients.

In 1956, she became the first Indian woman to be appointed to the Natal Provincial Administration.

== Works ==
Her 1960 historical novel Behold the Earth Mourns is considered the first published novel by an Indian South African writer, and described by scholar Antoinette Burton as "a critical history of anti-apartheid struggle."

- Behold the Earth Mourns. Cape Times. 1961.
- Cobwebs in the Garden
- A Tomb for thy Kingdom
- Summer Moonbeams on the Lake. 1970.

== Personal life ==
Singh married twice. She was briefly married in Great Britain, to Bronislav Sedzimer, during her medical school years. They had one daughter, Urvashi. She married again, to lawyer Ashwin Choudree, in 1948. Choudree was in leadership in the Natal Indian Congress and the South African Indian Council. Singh was widowed when Choudree died in 1969.

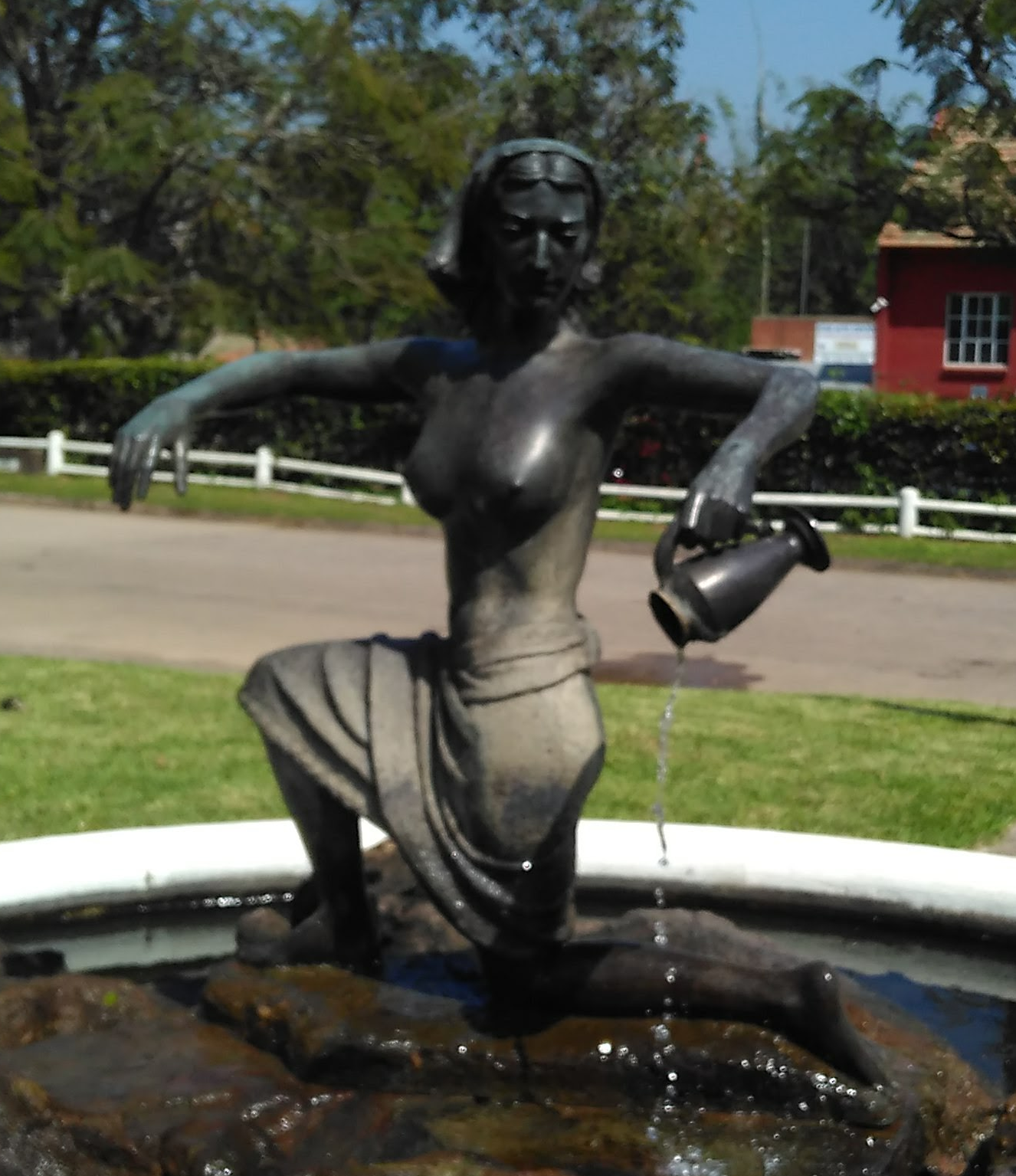
A statue of Singh as Natir Puja

Singh was a devotee of the arts: She was an accomplished pianist, and a talented amateur dramatist. She took part in many productions between 1948 and 1958, including Rabindranath Tagore's plays such as Natir Puja, a demanding role requiring acting and dancing skills.

Singh died in 1978, aged 61 years.

== Commemoration ==
She is commemorated by a bronze statue depicting her as Natir Puja, the dancing girl in Tagore's play of the same name. The statue is in the Amanzinyama Gardens in oThongathi. (Note: Verwey records that the statue is near the Tongaat Town Hall it is in fact located at 29°34′13″S 31°07′23″E)
