= University of Pretoria Faculty of Education =

- Former name: Transvaal University College (1908–1930)
- Type: Public; Education
- Established: 1908
- Affiliations: University of Pretoria
- Dean: Prof Chika Sehoole
- Location: (South Africa) Pretoria, Gauteng, South Africa
- Campus: Groenkloof
Colours
Blue, Gold and Red
- Nickname: Tuks or Tukkies
- Mascot: Oom Gert
- Website: Faculty of Education

The University of Pretoria Faculty of Education was incorporated and merged with the University of Pretoria in 1908. The Faculty has five departments, four centres and units and collaborates with more than seven international bodies. The Faculty offers the undergraduate BEd degrees, postgraduate degrees as well as several continuing education courses.

== History ==
The University of Pretoria was founded in 1908. The Faculty of Education at UP was founded on 17 June 1937. The Normal College of Pretoria, in turn, was founded in 1902. The Faculty of Education at Pretoria incorporated the Teacher Training College in Pretoria (formerly the Normal College of Pretoria) in 2000 and subsequently moved to the Groenkloof campus.

== Campus ==
The Faculty is situated on the Groenkloof Campus, in Groenkloof Pretoria. The campus houses four student residences namely Kiaat, Inca, Zinnia and Lillium. Groenkloof Campus has various sports fields and facilities on campus.

== Academics ==
The Faculty offers a number of undergraduate degrees such as the BEd (Foundation Phase Teaching), BEd (Intermediate Phase Teaching) and BEd (Senior Phase and Further Education and Training Phase Teaching). All the mentioned undergraduate degrees are minimum four-year degrees.

The Faculty also offers BEd Honours, Masters of Education, Doctorate of Education and a Postgraduate Certificate in Education (PGCE).

The Faculty has been ranked as one of the Top 200 Faculties of Education in the world by the QS Rankings.

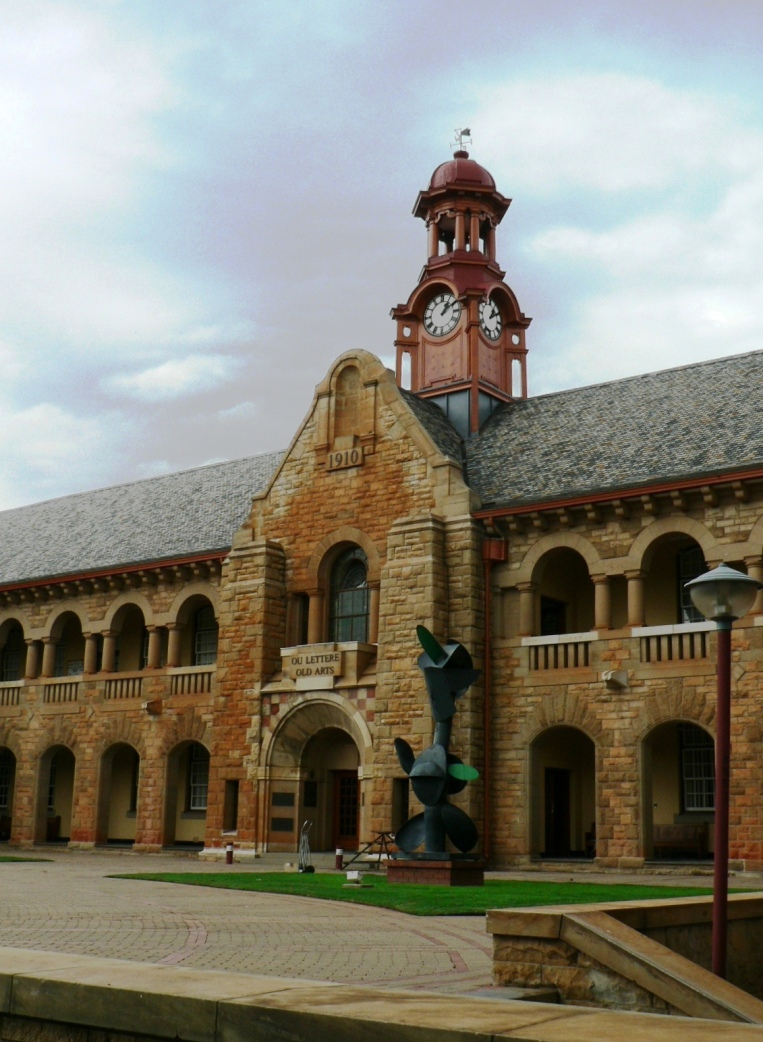
The University of Pretoria Old Arts building

== Centres, units and institutes ==
Centres, Units & Institutes in the Faculty include the Centre for the Study of Resilience, the Unit for Distance Education, the Centre for Evaluation & Assessment Interuniversity and the Centre for Education Law and Education Policy.

== African Deans of Education Forum ==
The University of Pretoria Faculty of Education, South Africa, took the initiative in 2013 to establish a platform for African deans of education. An informal structure under the leadership of Prof Irma Eloff (University of Pretoria Dean at the time) was established, with the University of Pretoria hosting the Secretariat of the Forum.

The African Deans of Education Forum was launched in July 2013 at the DETA 2013 Conference in Nairobi, Kenya.

== Former Deans ==
The Dean of Education serves as the head of the Faculty of Education. Prof Irma Eloff was the first female Dean of the faculty.

| Name | Took office | Left office |
|---|---|---|
| Prof Chika Sehoole | 2016 | Present |
| Prof Irma Eloff | 2008 | 2016 |
| Prof Jonatan Jansen | 2000 | 2007 |
| Prof Michael Bondesio | 1989 | 1999 |
| Prof F van der Stoep | 1971 | 1989 |
| Prof BF Nel | 1945 | 1970 |
| Prof ID Bosman | 1938 | 1945 |
| Prof JC Bosman | 1937 | 1937 |
