= Kirsten Miller (South African writer) =

South African writer

- Miller in 2008
- Education: University of KwaZulu-Natal
- Occupations: Novelist, writer and artist
- Website: www.kirstenmiller.co.za

Kirsten Miller is an accomplished South African novelist, writer and artist represented by numerous published works and a range of large scale private and public art pieces.

== Education ==
Miller has a BA (Hons.) cum laude and an MA summa cum laude from the University of KwaZulu-Natal.

== Career ==
Miller has held jobs as a university lecturer, creativity teacher and dolphin trainer and has lived in Gqeberha, London, Cape Town and Johannesburg.

Miller currently resides in Durban and runs the Kirsten Miller Creative Studio located within the grounds of the famous Phansi Museum. The studio provides courses and individual interaction in writing, art, literacy and development for neurodivergent and neurotypical people.

Miller was formerly the founding director of the NGO Action in Autism, which provides support and resources for autistic children and adults and their families. The organization also lobbies government and civil society to improve quality of life for people with Autism Spectrum Disorders (ASD).

Her spare time is spent attending to her artwork and writing.

=== Author ===
Miller's first book, Children on the Bridge: A Story of Autism in South Africa, is an autobiographical account of her early work as a tutor of autistic children. It details her experiences working with these children and their families and the effect this work has on her personal life.

Her first novel, All is Fish, was shortlisted for the 2005 European Union Literary Awards. The novel is set in the resort town of Mtunzini in Zululand, South Africa, and deals warmly with the complex relationships between the three central protagonists.

In 2014, the novel Sister Moon was published by Umuzi, Random House. Sister Moon is a story of love and growing up, of exclusion and abuse. Two further novels The Hum of the Sun and All That is Left were published by NB Publishers, under their imprint Kwela Books, in 2018 and 2020 respectively. The Hum of the Sun has been translated into German for the Basel-based publisher Baobab Books. The novel was released in Europe in September 2021 under the title Hörst du, wie der Himmel singt?.

Miller has published short stories in five collections and was also a three times finalist in the SA Pen Awards. In 2012 her autism themed play "Remember Joe" was published in Short, Sharp and Snappy, a collection of plays by South African playwrights and authors. Miller was a featured book reviewer for the Sunday Times newspaper and has contributed regularly to South African Airways' in-flight magazine Sawubona until 2014. Miller was a regular contributor to the online magazine My Modern Met

Miller has written an illustrated children's book titled A Time for Faeries, which was published in South Africa in 2008.

=== Public and TV appearances ===
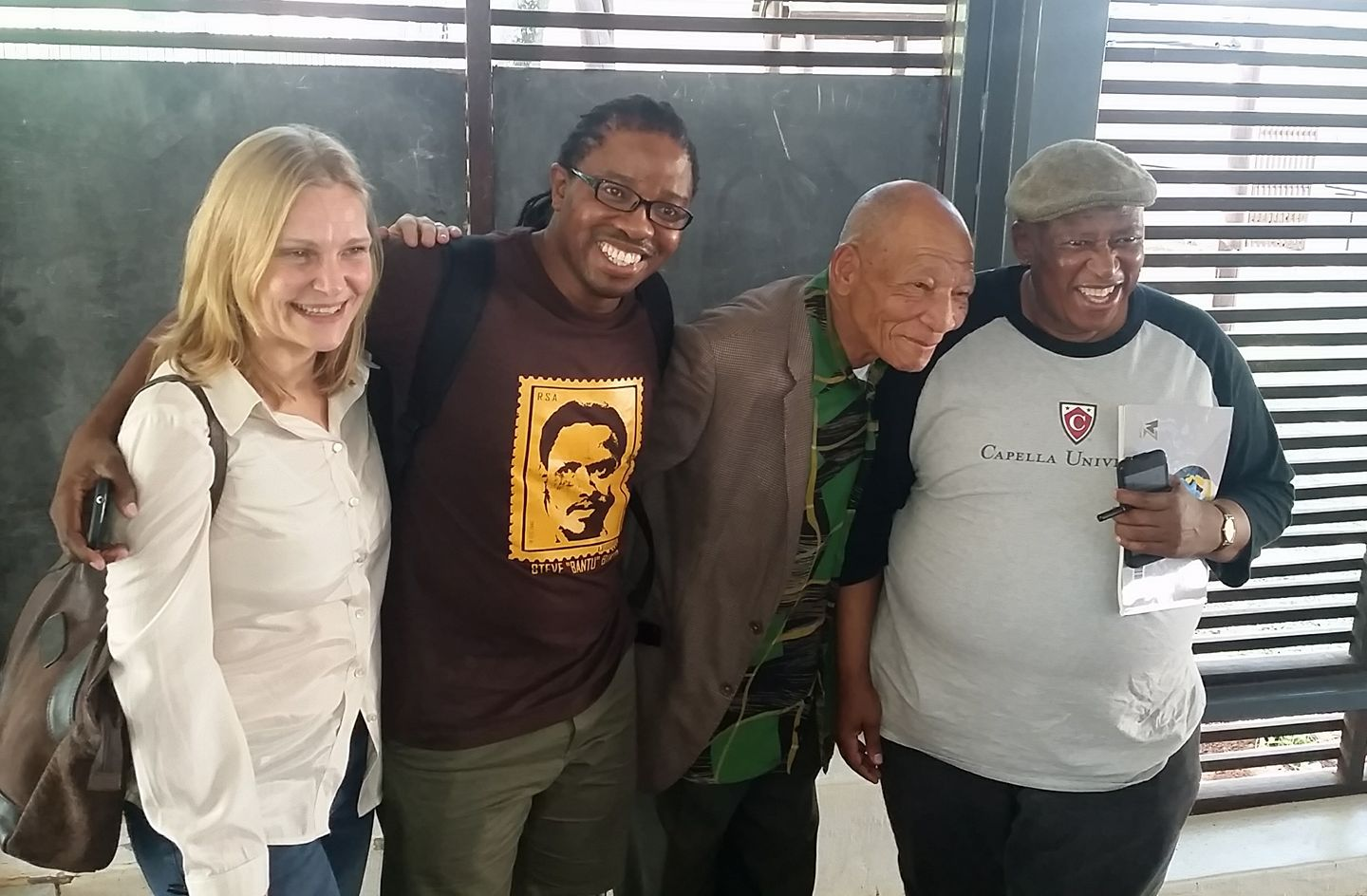
South African writers Miller, Sabata Mokae, Don Mattera and Zakes Mda at the KZNSA Art Gallery

Miller was featured in the 2008, 2015, 2018 and 2020 Time of the Writer International Writers Festivals alongside Breyten Breytenbach, Charles Mungoshi, Ananda Devi and John Pilger. Kirsten has been a participant in the Franschhoek Literary Festival, the Midlands Literary Festival, the Karoo Writer's Festival all in South Africa. In 2025 she was invited to attended the BuchBasel festival in Switzerland by her Swiss publisher Baobab Books.

SABC TV featured Miller in the series The Power Within, aired in December 2009, where she discussed her work in autism, writing and art. She has made a number of TV and radio appearances where she has spoken about her writing and about her work in autism.

=== Artist ===
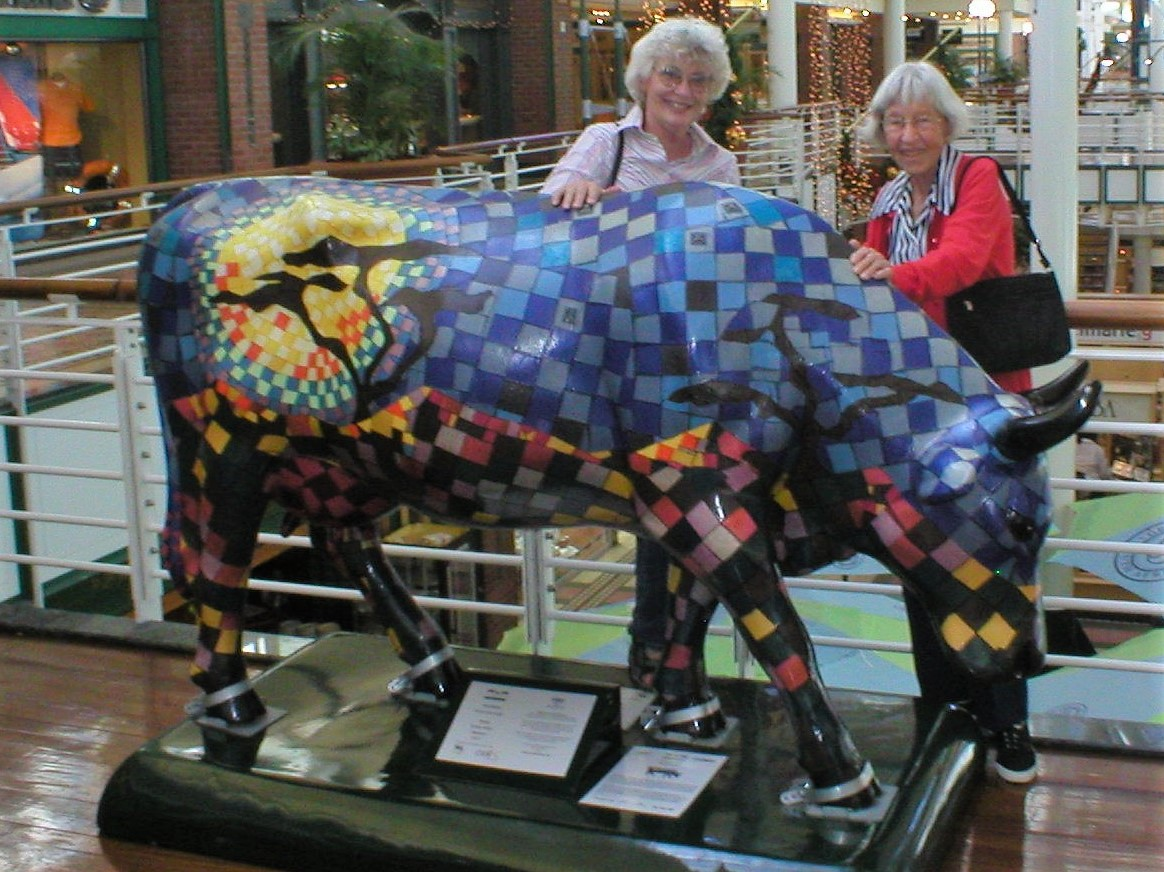
African Moo-nlight at Waterfront Mall, Cape Town

Miller works in mosaics, oils and watercolours, drawing inspiration from her surroundings and thoughts. She has completed commissions from the National Arts Council for large-scale mosaic pieces working with autistic people. Johannesburg's Unity Gallery held solo exhibitions of her work in 2005 and 2012.

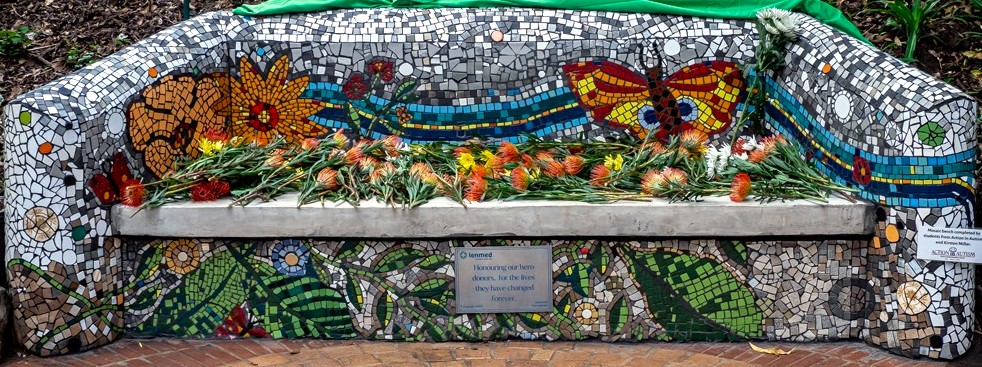
Mosaic Bench, Durban Botanic Gardens - 2023

In 2023 and in 2024, Miller was commissioned to create two memorial benches in the Durban Botanic Gardens to commemorate organ donors and their families. The benches' mosaics were made with help from autistic adults from Action in Autism's Shahumna Centre.

A large public commission by the eThekweni (Durban) municipality was completed by Kirsten in 2024. The work was for the replacement of 18 large mosaic ellipses on the platform and large mosaics for the entrance of the iconic uMhlanga Rocks Whalebone Pier. Miller lead a team of 14 artists and volunteers who assisted in the design, fabrication and installation of the mosaic artwork on the whale themed pier, rated by CNN as the world's most beautiful.

Her life-size fabric, beads and fiberglass commission of African Moo-nlight for the children's cancer charity CowParade was purchased on auction by the brewer SABMiller.

== Literary awards ==
- Her first novel, All is Fish, was shortlisted for the 2005 European Union Literary Awards.
- 3 times finalist in the SA Pen Awards for short stories.
- In 2016, Miller won the Wilbur Smith Adventure Writing Prize for Best Unpublished Adventure Manuscript with "The Hum of the Sun". Her prize from the Wilbur and Niso Smith Foundation allowed her to travel to Ireland and Spain, spending time in the cities of Dublin and Barcelona to do research for a future unnamed novel. The Hum of the Sun was published by Kwela Books in 2018.
- In 2018 and 2019, Miller won the Aziz Hassim Literary Awards (Main Category) awarded by the Minara Organisation for her manuscript "Comfortable Skin" (published in March 2020 as All That Is Left) and her published work The Hum of the Sun.
- The Hum of the Sun was long-listed for the 2020 International Dublin Literary Award along with Cynthia Jele, Tim Winton and Haruki Murakami

== Selected publications ==
=== Literary fiction ===
- Hörst du, wie der Himmel singt? (Baobab) 2021
- All That is Left - (Kwela) 2020
- The Hum of the Sun - (Kwela) 2018
- Sister Moon - (Umuzi) 2014
- All is Fish - (Jacana) 2007

=== Autobiography ===
- Children on the Bridge: A Story of Autism in South Africa - (Jacana) 2006

=== Short stories and plays in collections ===
- "Remember Joe" in Short, Sharp and Snappy - 2012
- "Mobile" in Africa Inside Out - 2012
- "Only in Art" in New Writing from Africa - 2009
- "Chance Encounter" in Dinaane: Short Stories by South African Women - 2007
- "The Chief's Spell" in African Road - 2006
- "White Boy" in African Compass - 2005
- "When the Master Calls" in Uncovered Mirrors - 1999

=== Illustrated children's book ===
- A Time for Faeries - (Reach) 2008
