= Marianne du Toit =

South African adventurer and photographer

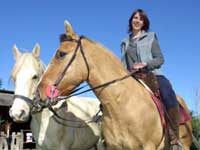
Marianne du Toit with Mise and Tusa

Marianne du Toit (born 1969) is a South African adventurer and photographer, notable for her twenty-one month long journey on horseback and foot from Argentina to New York.

== Biography ==
After graduating from Stellenbosch University in 1992 with a BA degree in political science and psychology, she spent three years exploring and cycling through Europe before finally settling in Dublin, where she currently lives.

Inspired by the Swiss adventurer Aimé Félix Tschiffely, who from 1925 to 1928 traveled from Buenos Aires to Washington DC with two Criollo horses, Marianne resolved to follow in his footsteps. She decided to use the journey to promote and raise money in support of therapeutic riding facilities in Ireland.

“I remember, since I was about 17 I would always read these articles about independent daring women who had done these amazing journeys. There was always something deep down driving me to these adventurous things. I just loved the adrenaline and the excitement.”

She spoke no Spanish and knew little about horses and horse riding but set off in May 2002 from Ireland for South America where her two Criollo’s, Mise and Tusa, were acquired. Their names mean respectively Me and You in the Irish language. Six months into her journey, Tusa was found to be suffering from anaemia and was put down. Marianne considered admitting defeat; however, despite numerous other hardships, she persevered and completed the journey, joining in the St Patrick’s Day parade through the streets of New York in 2004. Marianne's adventures are related in her book Crying with Cockroaches.

Supporting the Dublin Society for Prevention of Cruelty to Animals, Marianne rescues stray dogs from Dublin streets. The foie gras industry, factory farming, testing on animals, the fur trade and use of animals in the circus are some of the issues she chooses to highlight.

== Bibliography ==
- Crying with Cockroaches: Argentina to New York with Two Horses - Marianne du Toit (Liendi Publishers 2007) ISBN 978-0-9553714-0-0 ISBN 0955371406
