= Thirza Nash =

South African novelist

Thirza Eagle Nash (1885 – 1962) was a South African novelist who wrote about white settler life.

== Life ==
Thirza Goch was born in Lilyfontein Mission, Namaqualand on 18 November 1885 then the Cape Colony, not far from the border with what would later be designated South West Africa. Her father was Willem Carel Goch, Wesleyan Minister and missionary at Leliefontein mission station, Namaqualand, and her mother was Louisa Anne Charleston. She studied at the Normal College of Pretoria, and married William Benjamin Nash in 1917. She accompanied her husband, a mining geologist, to frontier settlements in South West Africa. She died in Johannesburg on 20 June 1962 and was buried two days later on the 22 June 1962

== Works ==
- Oh, Miss Maginty!, London: Hodder & Stoughton, 1920
- The Ex-Gentleman. London: Jarrolds, 1925
- "Detained at the Office", The 20-Story Magazine, Vol. 28. No. 168 (June 1936)
- The Geyer Brood. London: Cassell, 1946
- Witchweed. London: Cassell, 1947
- For Passion is Darkness. London: Cassell, 1951
