= Audrey Blignault =

South African writer

- Born: 6 July 1916
- Died: 1 October 2008 (aged 92)
- Education: Stellenbosch University
- Occupation: Writer
- Writing career
- Notable awards: Eugène Marais Prize 1961; W.A. Hofmeyr Prize 1965

Audrey Bettie Blignault (July 6, 1916 – October 1, 2008) was a South African writer.

== Life ==
The daughter of an Irish mother and an Afrikaner father who was the town's mayor, she was born Audrey Bettie Swart in Bredasdorp. She studied Afrikaans literature at Stellenbosch University, receiving an MA in Afrikaans and Dutch.

In 1940, she began teaching at Wellington and then later at Stellenbosch. In 1945, she became the editor of Die Huisvrou, a women's magazine. In the same year, she started the first Afrikaans book programme on the radio. For 25 years, she wrote a column for the Afrikaans women's magazine Sarie. Essays from those columns were collected and published in 17 books. A collection of her letters Audrey Blignault: ’n Blywende vreugde was published in May 2008. Blignault also was editor for Naweekpos and directed the women's culture programme for the South African Broadcasting Corporation.

Blignault died in a Cape Town clinic at the age of 92.

== Family ==
She was married twice: first to Andries Blignault; he died in an automobile accident in 1967. She was seriously injured in the same accident but was the only survivor from the vehicle. She married Attie de Villiers in 1970. Her daughter Marié Heese also became a writer.

== Awards and honours ==
She received the Eugène Marais Prize in 1961, the W.A. Hofmeyr Prize in 1965 and the Italian Adelaide Ristori Prize. In 1982, she received the State President's award for outstanding service. She was the first woman to be named to the board of the South African Academy for Science and Culture.

== Selected works ==
- In klein maat Kaapstad, 1955. OCLC 557309500
- Die vrolike lied (1957)
- Met ligter tred (1962)
