= Noel Evans (cricketer) =

English cricketer

Personal information
- Full name: Edward Noel Evans
- Born: 7 December 1911; Edmonton, Middlesex, England
- Died: 12 February 1964 (aged 52); Kensington, London, England
- Batting: Left-handed
- Bowling: Leg break googly

Domestic team information
- Years: Team
- 1931–1933: Oxford University
- 1934: Marylebone Cricket Club

Career statistics
Competition	First-class
Matches	22
Runs scored	617
Batting average	18.14
100s/50s	–/2
Top score	91
Balls bowled	299
Wickets	5
Bowling average	44.80
5 wickets in innings	–
10 wickets in match	–
Best bowling	2/56
Catches/stumpings	5/–
- Source: Cricinfo, 2 March 2020

Edward Noel Evans (7 December 1911 – 12 February 1964) was an English first-class cricketer.

The son of Edward William Evans, he was born at Edmonton in December 1911. He was educated at Haileybury, before going up to Wadham College, Oxford. While studying at Oxford, he played first-class cricket for Oxford University, making his debut against Lancashire at Oxford in 1931. He played first-class cricket for Oxford until losing his place in the side in 1933, having made 21 appearances. He scored 613 runs for Oxford, at an average of 18.57 and a high score of 91. In 1934, he made a first-class appearance for the Marylebone Cricket Club against Ireland at Dublin.

Evans married Audrey Mary Leathers, the daughter of Frederick Leathers, 1st Viscount Leathers in July 1938. He served in the Second World War with the Royal Naval Volunteer Reserve and was mentioned in dispatches in May 1944. He spent his working life in the family publishing business. Evans died at Kensington in February 1964.
