= Dawn Faith =

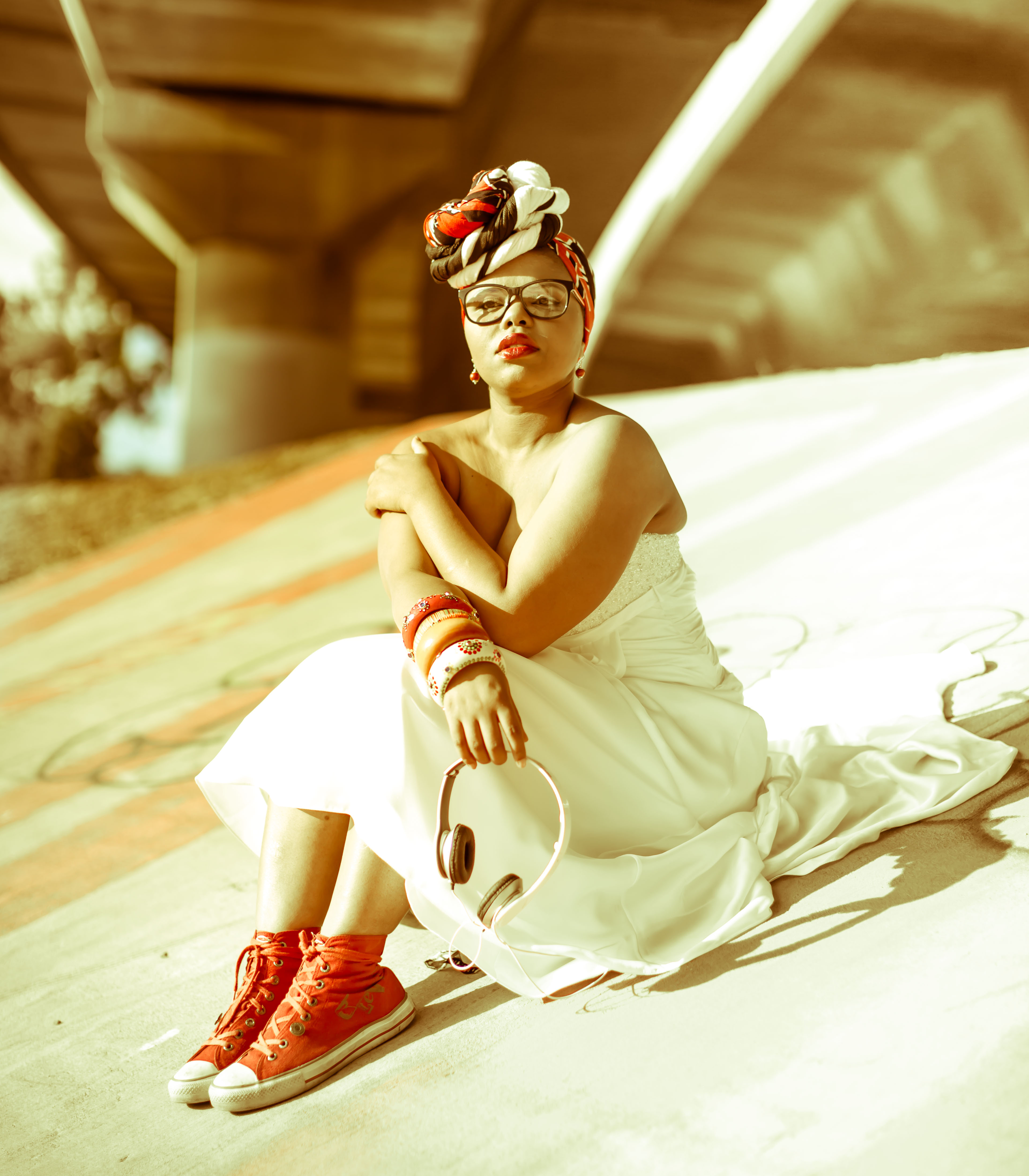
- Born: Dawn Faith Mlotshwa; 16 January 1982 (age 44); KwaZulu Natal, South Africa
- Occupations: Author; TV presenter; Musician; Social Activist
- Years active: 2005–present
- Partner: Nic Mackay (2007–present)
- Children: 2
- Website: Dawn Faith

Dawn Faith Mackay (née Mlotshwa, born 16 January 1982 in KwaMashu, KwaZulu-Natal, South Africa) is an author, musician, social activist and television host. In 2016, she established a TV production company, MYZIZI Productions, named after her daughter Zinhle (Zizi) Grace, who was born around four months premature and died aged three months. in Melbourne, Australia.

== Early life ==
Mackay grew up in the South African township of KwaMashu. She grew up listening to Aretha Franklin, Donnie Hathaway and Kool & The Gang and the music in her grandmother's church.

== Social activism ==
Mackay was the South African Director of the foundation Oaktree and worked in partnership with Nelson Mandela's 46664 to find ways of using music for good.

== Music ==
Mackay started her music career in 2008 working with a local artists in South Africa. She has recorded and collaborated with artists in South Africa (Loyiso Bala, Zakes Bantwini & Ntokozo Mbambo) and Australia (Evermore, Diafrix).

Her first single, "Messed Up Heart", was produced by Jason Heerah (Electric Empire) and Dorian West (X Factor, Australia's Got Talent). Mackay charted as the No. 1 artist in Melbourne and No. 7 in Australia on the ReverbNation R&B/Soul charts. In 2015, she wrote and produced her debut EP, "Audience of One". The EP integrates elements of jazz and gospel music. It was inspired by the death of her daughter, the birth of her son, and the journey between those events.

=== Discography ===
Title	Album details
Black Harmony	Released: June 2013; Label: MYZIZI Music; Format: Digital download
Messed up Heart	Released: October 2014; Label: MYZIZI Music; Format: Digital download
Audience of One	Released: October 2015; Label: MYZIZI Music; Format: Digital download

== Other work ==
Mackay returned to South Africa in 2016 to write and release her first book, Dear God, which tells the story of her daughter's death and how Mackay processed her grief. In 2017, she created, hosted and was the executive producer of a talk show called Deep & Meaningful. The show features a range of high-profile women as guests, and will air across Africa and the world on BET Africa Channel 129.

== Personal life ==
Mackay lives in Johannesburg with her Australian husband Nic Mackay and their son, Lwandle Mackay.
