= 267 Tirza =

Main-belt asteroid

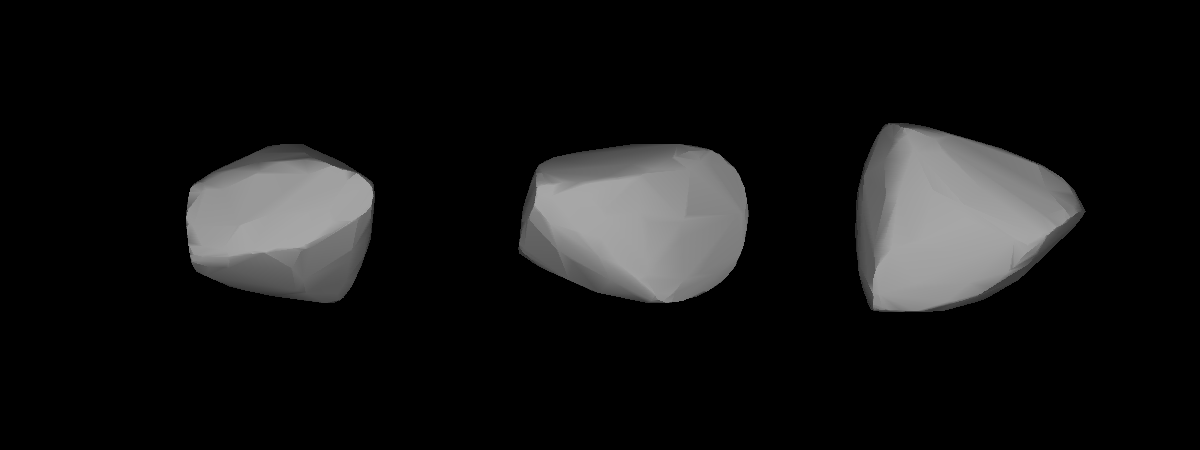
- Lightcurve-based 3D model of 267 Tirza

Discovery
- Discovered by: Auguste Charlois
- Discovery date: 27 May 1887

Designations
- Pronunciation: /ˈtɜːrzə/
- Named after: Tirzah
- Alternative designations: A887 KB, 1922 AA; 1965 GC
- Minor planet category: Main belt

Orbital characteristics
- Epoch 31 July 2016 (JD 2457600.5)
- Uncertainty parameter 0
- Observation arc: 108.44 yr (39609 d)
- Aphelion: 3.04773 AU (455.934 Gm)
- Perihelion: 2.50143 AU (374.209 Gm)
- Semi-major axis: 2.77458 AU (415.071 Gm)
- Eccentricity: 0.098448
- Orbital period (sidereal): 4.62 yr (1688.1 d)
- Mean anomaly: 327.898°
- Mean motion: 0° 12^{m} 47.732^{s} / day
- Inclination: 6.00306°
- Longitude of ascending node: 73.7538°
- Argument of perihelion: 196.255°

Physical characteristics
- Dimensions: 52.68±3.1 km
- Synodic rotation period: 7.648 h (0.3187 d)
- Geometric albedo: 0.0402±0.005
- Spectral type: DU
- Absolute magnitude (H): 10.2

267 Tirza is a fairly large, very dark Main belt asteroid.

It was discovered by Auguste Charlois on 27 May 1887 in Nice. It was his first asteroid discovery.

It was named after Tirzah, a name used in the Song of Solomon.
