= Michelle Nkamankeng =

South African novelist

Michelle Nkamankeng (born c. 2008) is a South African born novelist, from Johannesburg, but originally from Cameroon who has become the youngest author in South Africa and also by being in the top 10 of the world's youngest authors. Her first book titled Waiting for the Waves published by LANSM Publishing Ltd, is the first part of a four-book series. The books in her four part series include: 1. Waiting in the Waves, 2. The little girl who believes on herself, 3.The little mouse and lastly, 4. The Golden Ring.

Laurentine (Lolo) Nkamankeng is her mother and manager, her father Paul Nkamankeng, and her siblings are Shawn, Sheena and Marion.
