= Marié Heese =

South African novelist and teacher (born 1942)

- Born: 27 September 1942 (age 83); Cape Town, Western Cape, South Africa
- Education: Hoërskool Jan van Riebeeck
- Alma mater: Stellenbosch University, University of South Africa
- Occupations: Novelist and Teacher
- Relatives: Audrey Blignault (mother)
- Writing career
- Language: Afrikaans

Marié Heese (born 27 September 1942, Cape Town) is a South African novelist and teacher. She won the 2010 Commonwealth Writers' Prize for Africa.

== Life ==
She is the daughter of Audrey Blignault. She grew up in Cape Town. She studied at the Stellenbosch University and University of South Africa (UNISA). She married Chris Heese; they have three children.

== Works ==
- Die uurwerk kantel, Tafelberg-uitgewers, 1976, ISBN 978-0-624-00910-8
- Tyd van beslissing: 'n roman, Perskor, 1987, ISBN 978-0-628-03221-8
- The Double Crown, Human & Rousseau, 2009; International Publishers Marketing, 2011, ISBN 978-0-7981-5036-1

=== Essays ===
- Tokkelspel, Tafelberg, 1972, ISBN 978-0-624-00086-0

=== Travel ===
- Die honger reisiger, Tafelberg, ISBN 978-0-624-04882-4

=== Children's books ===
- Die Pikkewouters van Amper-Stamperland, Human & Rousseau, 1984
- Avonture in Amper-Stamperland, Human & Rousseau, 1986

=== Editor ===
- Audrey Blignault: Uit die dagboek van 'n vrou, Tafelberg, 2009, ISBN 978-0-624-04774-2
