= Judith Sealy =

South African archaeologist

- Education: University of Cape Town
- Known for: Stable Light Isotope
- Scientific career
- Fields: Archaeology
- Workplaces: University of Cape Town
- Thesis: Reconstruction of Later Stone Age diets in the South-Western Cape, South Africa : evaluation and application of five isotopic and trace element techniques (1989)
- Website: www.archaeology.uct.ac.za/age/faculty-and-staff/judith-sealy

Judith Sealy is a Professor and South Africa Research Chairs Initiative Research Chair in Archaeology and Paleoenvironmental Studies and director of the Stable Light Isotope Lab in the Department of Archaeology at the University of Cape Town.

== Selected publications ==
- Loftus, E. J., & J. Sealy, 2012. "Interpreting stable carbon isotopes in human tooth enamel: an examination of tissue spacings from South Africa". American Journal of Physical Anthropology 147: 499–507.
- Sealy, J., & M. Galimberti, 2011. "Shellfishing and the interpretation of shellfish sizes in the Middle and Later Stone Ages of South Africa". In: N. F. Bicho, J. A. Haws & L. G. Davis (eds), Trekking the Shore: Changing Coastlines and the Antiquity of Coastal Settlement: 405–419. New York: Springer. ISBN 978 1 4419 8218 6
- Codron, J., D. Codron, J. A. Lee-Thorp, M. Sponheimer, K. Kirkman, K. J. Duffy & J. Sealy, 2011. "Landscape-scale feeding patterns of African elephant inferred from carbon isotope analysis of feces". Oecologia 165: 89–99.
- Sealy, J., 2010. "Isotopic evidence for the antiquity of cattle-based pastoralism in southernmost Africa". Journal of African Archaeology 8(1): 65–81.
- Ribot, I., A. G. Morris, J. Sealy & T. Maggs, 2010. "Population history and economic change in the last 2000 years in KwaZulu-Natal, RSA". Southern African Humanities 22: 89–112.
- Hine, P., J. Sealy, D. Halkett & T. Hart, 2010. "Antiquity of stone-walled tidal fish-traps on the Cape coast, South Africa". South African Archaeological Bulletin 65: 35–44.
- Styring, A. K., J. C. Sealy & R. P. Evershed, 2010. "Resolving the bulk δ15N values of ancient human and animal bone collagen via compound-specific nitrogen isotope analysis of constituent amino acids". Geochimica et Cosmochimica Acta 74: 241–251.
- Chase, B. M., M. E. Meadows, L. Scott, D. S. G. Thomas, E. Marais, J. Sealy & P. J. Reimer, 2009. "A record of rapid Holocene climate change preserved in hyrax middens from southwestern Africa". Geology 37(8): 703–706.
- Lee-Thorp, J. A., & J. C. Sealy, 2008. "Beyond documenting diagenesis: the Fifth International Bone Diagenesis Workshop". Palaeogeography, Palaeoclimatology, Palaeoecology 266:129–133.
- Stynder, D. D., R. R. Ackermann & J. C. Sealy, 2007. "Craniofacial variation and population continuity during the South African Holocene". American Journal of Physical Anthropology 134(4):489–500.
- Sealy, J. 2006. "Diet, mobility and settlement pattern among Holocene hunter-gatherers in southernmost Africa". Current Anthropology 47:569–595.
- Sealy, J., B. Ludwig & Z. Henderson, 2006. "New radiocarbon dates for Matjes River Rock Shelter". South African Archaeological Bulletin 61:98–101.
- Clayton, F., J. Sealy & S. Pfeiffer, 2006. "Weaning age among foragers at Matjes River Rock Shelter, South Africa, from stable nitrogen and carbon isotope analyses". American Journal of Physical Anthropology 129:311–317.
- Pfeiffer, S., & J. Sealy, 2006. "Body size among Holocene foragers of the Cape ecozone, southern Africa". American Journal of Physical Anthropology 129:1–11.
- Corr, L. T., J. C. Sealy, M. C. Horton & R. P. Evershed, 2005. "A novel marine dietary indicator utilizing compound-specific bone collagen amino acid δ13C values of ancient humans". Journal of Archaeological Science 32:321–330.
- Sealy, J., T. Maggs, A. Jerardino & J. Kaplan, 2004. "Excavations at Melkbosstrand: variability among herder sites on Table Bay, South Africa". South African Archaeological Bulletin 59:17–28.
- Henshilwood, C. S., F. D'Errico, R. Yates, Z. Jacobs, C. Tribolo, G. A. T. Duller, N. Mercier, J. C. Sealy, H. Valladas, I. Watts & A. G. Wintle, 2002. "Emergence of modern human behaviour: Middle Stone Age engravings from South Africa". Science 295:1278–1280.
- Henshilwood, C. S., J. C. Sealy, R. Yates, K. Cruz-Uribe, P. Goldberg, F. E. Grine, R. G. Klein, C. Poggenpoel, K. van Niekerk & I. Watts, 2001. "Blombos Cave, southern Cape, South Africa: preliminary report on the 1992–1999 excavations of the Middle Stone Age levels". Journal of Archaeological Science 28:421–448.
- Cox, G., J. Sealy, C. Schrire & A. Morris, 2001. "Stable carbon and nitrogen isotopic analyses of the underclass at the colonial Cape of Good Hope in the 18th and 19th century". World Archaeology 33:73–97.
