= Tirzah (Biblical name) =

Biblical character

Tirzah /ˈtɜːrzə/ (Hebrew: תִּרְצָה, variant "Thirza") is one of the daughters of Zelophehad in the Book of Numbers.

== Tirzah in scripture ==
Tirzah is first mentioned in the Torah (Numbers 26:33) as one of the five daughters of Zelophehad. After the death of their father, the five sisters went to Moses and asked him for hereditary rights (Numbers 27:1–11). Moses brought their plea to God, and it was granted. To this day, women in Judaism have the right to inherit property, though only when there are no male heirs with an equally close relationship to the deceased.

Tirzah (my delight) was one of those five daughters of Zelophehad, whose heiresship occupies two chapters of the Book of Numbers. She probably was the origin of Thirza, the name of Abel's wife in Gessner's idyll of the Death of Abel, a great favourite among the lower classes in England, whence Thyrza has become rather a favourite in English cottages.

— Yonge, 1878

== Tirzah in literature ==
Tirzah is a figure in William Blake's mythology, notably in his poem To Tirzah from Songs of Experience. According to Northrop Frye, Blake identified both the Biblical city of Tirzah and the daughter of Zelophehad with worldliness and materialism, as opposed to the spiritual realm of Jerusalem in Judah.

The name Tirzah has a similar symbolism in Lew Wallace's novel Ben-Hur: A Tale of the Christ, in which it is given to the leprosy-afflicted sister of Judah Ben-Hur, who is eventually cleansed by Jesus. The character of Tirzah, played by Cathy O'Donnell, appears in William Wyler's 1959 film Ben-Hur, which won the Academy Award for Best Picture.

== See also ==
- Tirzah (disambiguation) lists other people with the given name Tirzah
