= Shereen Usdin =

Shereen Usdin was born in Durban (South Africa), on 8 April 1962. She graduated as a medical doctor from the University of Witwatersrand (Johannesburg) in 1985. In 1995 she attained a Masters of Public Health, at Harvard University. She is a founding member of the South-African Soul City Institute for Health and Development Communication, now the Soul City Institute of Social Justice. She is active in the fields of Sexual and Reproductive Health and Rights, violence against women and health and human rights.

== Published work ==
She contributed to numerous books and also wrote numerous papers and journal articles. She authored the No Nonsense Guide to HIV/AIDS, and the "No Nonsense Guide to World Health (Verso Press/New Internationalist).
