= Gabeba Baderoon =

South African poet and academic

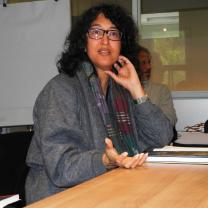
Professor Baderoon speaks on her book, Regarding Muslims: From Slavery to Post-Apartheid (Wits, 2014) (4 August 2014)

Gabeba Baderoon (born 21 February 1969) is a South African poet and academic. She is the 2005 recipient of the Daimler Chrysler Award for South African Poetry. She lives and works in Cape Town, South Africa, and Pennsylvania, US, and serves as an assistant professor of Women’s, Gender and Sexuality Studies, African Studies and Comparative Literature at Pennsylvania State University. She divides her life between Port Elizabeth and Pennsylvania.

== Early life and education ==
Baderoon was born in Port Elizabeth, South Africa, on 21 February 1969. In 1989 she received her Bachelor of Arts from the University of Cape Town in English and Psychology. In 1991 she was awarded a First-class Honours degree in English from the University of Cape Town BA Honours program. She attained her Master of Arts in English with Distinction at the University of Cape Town in Postmodernist Television (Media Studies) and in 2004 completed her doctoral studies in Media Studies at the University of Cape Town. That year, she was also a visiting scholar at the University of Sheffield in the United Kingdom. Her dissertation was titled "Oblique Figures: Representations of Islam in South African Media and Culture."

== Poetry collections ==
| Title | Year | Awards and commendations |
|---|---|---|
| The Dream in the Next Body | 2005 | Notable Book of 2005 by the Sunday Independent in South Africa Sunday Times Recommended Book |
| The Museum of Ordinary life | 2005 | |
| A Hundred Silences | 2006 | 2007 University of Johannesburg Prize (shortlisted) 2007 Olive Schreiner Award |
| The Silence Before Speaking | | |
| Cinnamon | 2009 | |
| The History of Intimacy | 2018 | |

== Awards ==
- 2005: Daimler Chrysler Award for South African Poetry
- 2005: Guest Writer Fellowship at the Nordic Africa Institute
- 2008: Civitella Ranieri Fellowship in Italy
- 2008: Writer's Residency at the University of Witwatersrand
- 2019: Media24 Books Literary Prize: Elisabeth Eybers Prize for The History of Intimacy
- 2023: Sarah Baartman Senior Fellow at the University of Cape Town
