= Bob Moon (educationist) =

British education researcher

Bob Moon CBE FAcSS (born 1945) is Emeritus Professor of Education at The Open University (UK). The main focus of his career has been the research, design and development of new models of teacher education in the United Kingdom and more widely. In 2009, he was made a Fellow of the Academy of Social Sciences. In 2018, he was made a Commander of the Order of the British Empire (CBE) in The Queen’s Birthday Honours List for his work on education in developing countries.

== Biography ==
Moon was born in Marlborough, Wiltshire, in 1945. He studied to be a teacher at St Paul’s College, Cheltenham, and gained postgraduate qualifications at the Institute of Education, London University; the University of Warwick; and the University of Sussex (where he completed his doctorate). He began his career as a secondary teacher at Tulse Hill Comprehensive School in the Inner London Education Authority, and was later Headteacher of two large urban secondary schools, Bridgewater Hall School, Stantonbury Campus, Milton Keynes, and The Peers School, Oxford. In 1988, he was appointed Professor of Education at The Open University with a responsibility for developing national and international programmes in teaching and teacher education.

== Research and development in national and international teacher education ==
Moon has led the development of a range of projects directed at new approaches to teacher education with, particular respect to expanding access to teaching by the use of newly emerging digital technologies.

These included the Open University’s UK-wide Post Graduate Certificate in Education (PGCE), which ran from 1992 to 2018 and was designed to provide a school based, technology supported, route into teaching for mature entrants, particularly those with mathematics and science qualifications. The programme was awarded the Queen’s Anniversary Prize for Higher Education in 1997 in recognition of the innovative approach used, particularly the strong emphasis on information technologies and partnership between university and schools.

In 2005, Moon designed and led the team that established the Teacher Education in Sub-Saharan Africa (TESSA) Programme. The programme was developed in multi-lingual formats (Arabic, English, French and Kiswahili) and operates across ten countries. TESSA was also awarded the Queen’s Anniversary Award for Higher Education, in 2009, with special mention given to the web-based resources, adapted to local needs, that were being used by over 200,000 teachers. In 2011, the TESSA programme also received the World Innovation Summit for Education (WISE) Award. The TESSA experience led to the publication of a number of analyses that looked in detail at the challenge of providing school systems in developing countries with well-qualified teachers.

Between 2010 and 2015, Moon was the lead advisor to the United Nations Relief and Works Agency for Palestine Refugees (UNRWA) teacher improvement programme aimed at teachers working in refugee camps spread across Jordan, Lebanon, Syria, The West Bank and Gaza. The programme was taken by all teachers in the UNRWA schools and led to the adoption of a new model of teacher development within the Agency.

Between 2005 and 2020, Moon advised a number of countries and international agencies on educational reform, with specific reference to teachers and teacher education. He has used this experience in further developing an analysis of the ways in which teacher education can be reformed and improved in both developed and developing countries. In 2015, he was appointed Education Specialist on the UK Department for International Development’s Science Advisory Group (SAG); he held this position until 2020.

== Further contributions to curriculum studies and school improvement ==
Bob Moon was a founding member, in 1976, of the Association for the Study of the Curriculum, later the Curriculum Foundation. He was a Council member for over thirty years and led on the merger of the Association into the British Education Research Association (BERA) in 2012.

In 1990, he set up and became Chair of the Editorial Board of a new publication, The Curriculum Journal. He was co-editor from 2002 to 2012.

Also in 1990, Moon was also appointed an Associate Commissioner to The National Commission on Education, established by The British Association for the Advancement of Science and funded by the Paul Hamlyn Foundation. The Commission reported in 1993.

In 2003, the Department of Education (UK) appointed Bob Moon as an Advisor to the London Challenge. This programme, led by Sir Tim Brighouse, set out to improve significantly the quality of learning across all London secondary schools. An evaluation study by the Joseph Rowntree Foundation found that ‘during the period of the London Challenge school improvement in London saw a dramatic improvement and local authorities went from the worst performing to the best performing nationally.’ Moon and Brighouse subsequently collaborated, in 2013, to propose a National Teaching Institute for Teacher Professional Development. In 2020, they set out the case for a national Open School, modelled on the Open University, but serving the school sector.
