= Wilna Adriaanse =

South African novelist

- Born: 19 March 1958; Askham, Kalahari, South Africa
- Occupation: Writer
- Children: 3
- Writing career
- Period: 2000 - current
- Genre: Fiction
- Website: www.wilnaadriaanse.co.za

Wilna Adriaanse (born 1958) is a South African Afrikaans romantic fiction writer. Her first book, Die wingerd sal weer bot, was published in 2000 under the name Wilmine Burger. Her book called 'n Heildronk op liefde won the 2003 Lapa Publishers’ Prize for romance and in 2009 she was awarded the ATKV-Woordveertjie prize for her novel "Die boek van Ester".

Adriaanse was born on 19 March 1958 in the Kalahari, and grew up in Worcester. She matriculated in 1976 from Worcester High School. She earned a BA and BA honors in development administration from the University of Stellenbosch. In 2011, she completed a master's degree with distinction in Creative Writing at the University of Cape Town. Her thesis was also published under the title 'n Klein Lewe by Tafelberg.

== Works ==
As Wilna Adriaanse:

- ’n Ongewone belegging, Jasmyn, 2001
- Alleenvlug, Jasmyn, 2002
- Die reuk van verlange, Jasmyn, 2003
- Serenade vir ’n nagtegaal, Jasmyn, 2004
- Rebecca, Tafelberg, 2004
- Hande wat heel, Hartklop, 2005
- Met ander woorde, Tafelberg, 2006
- Die boek van Ester, Tafelberg, 2008
- Vier seisoene kind, Tafelberg, 2010
- 'n Klein lewe, Tafelberg, 2012
- Dubbelspel, Tafelberg, 2014
- Eindspel, Tafelberg, 2017
- Blindside, Tafelberg, 2019 (Translation of Dubbelspel)
- Endgame, Tafelberg, 2020 (Translation of Eindspel)
- Vlug, Tafelberg, 2021

As Wilmine Burger:

- Die wingerd sal weer bot, Lapa, 2000
- ’n Heildronk op die liefde, Lapa, 2002
- Liefde is ’n kleur, Lapa, 2002
- Brug van woorde, Lapa, 2004
