= 2022 Africa floods =

Historical Event

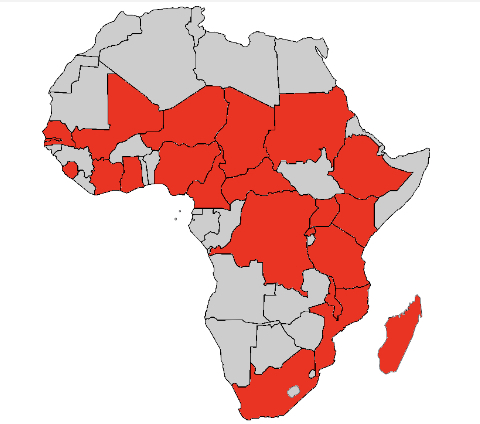
- A map of Africa. Affected countries are marked in red
- Date: January - December 2022
- Location: Angola, Benin, Cameroon, Central African Republic, Chad, Democratic Republic of the Congo, Ethiopia, Gabon, The Gambia, Ghana, Ivory Coast, Kenya, Madagascar, Malawi, Mali, Mozambique, Niger, Nigeria, Rwanda, Senegal, Sierra Leone, South Africa, Sudan, Tanzania, Uganda
- Cause: Heavy rains, Tropical cyclones
- Deaths: 2,177

Throughout 2022, floods affected most of Africa, killing over 2,100 people. The worst affected country was Nigeria, with over 610 deaths.

== Impact ==
=== Angola ===
In December, floods in Angola have killed two people, destroyed five homes, and damaged 238 others.

=== Benin ===
Twenty-seven municipalities in Benin were affected by flooding, leading to 41 fatalities and over 670 houses destroyed.

=== Cameroon ===
As of September 20, as many as 37,439 people from 6,662 families were affected by floods in northern Cameroon. At least 2 people have died and around 95 injured. As many as 9,413 homes and 88 schools had been damaged or destroyed. Around 2,394 hectares of crops were also damaged, and 3,019 heads of cattle were lost.

=== Central African Republic ===
In the Central African Republic, flooding had affected 85,300 people, killed 11, destroyed more than 2,600 houses and 18,500 hectares of crops, damaged numerous other infrastructures and displaced more than 6,000 people in 176 towns and villages across 12 of the country's 17 prefectures.

=== Chad ===
In August, floods have affected 17,000 people in Chad, resulting in the destruction of 1,312 homes. At least 22 people have died while 229 others were injured.

=== Democratic Republic of the Congo ===
From late February to March, at least 16 people, including four children died in Bukavu due to the flooding. Floods in April killed 20 people, while a further 21 deaths were reported in May.

From 12 to 14 December 2022, heavy rains left roads, infrastructure and many neighborhoods underwater or destroyed in Kinshasa, the Democratic Republic of the Congo's capital. Floods there killed 169 people.

On December 31, a landslide occurred in South Kivu, killing eight people.

=== Ethiopia ===
About 60,000 people were affected by floods, which have damaged some infrastructure.

=== Gabon ===
A flood-related landslide killed seven people near Libreville, Gabon.

=== Ghana ===
Two days of heavy rainfall had left many homes and a police station submerged in floodwater in eastern Ghana.

=== Ivory Coast ===
In June 2022, the Ivory Coast experienced its deadliest flooding in the country's history. At least 15 people died, including six by landslides and 114 were injured in Abidjan. About 1,900 houses were damaged and 11,900 people were affected.

=== Kenya ===
Flash floods had displaced hundreds of families following heavy downpour that was witnessed in Western Kenya.

=== Madagascar ===
On 18 January, floods hit Madagascar's capital Antananarivo, killing 10 people.

From late January 20 to February, Cyclone Batsirai and Tropical Storm Ana destroyed thousands of homes, and caused 179 deaths in Madagascar. Cyclone Gombe caused a further two deaths.

=== Malawi ===
In January, six houses collapsed and 126 others were damaged in flooding in Malawi.

Tropical Storm Ana caused 37 deaths in the country, while Cyclone Gombe in March caused a further seven deaths.

=== Mali ===
In Mopti, at least 550 houses were damaged by flood water, which submerged villages up to 6.72 m (22.0 ft) high.

=== Mozambique ===
Tropical Storm Ana lead to 20 deaths in Mozambique. In March, Cyclone Gombe caused a further 63 deaths and destroyed thousands of homes.

=== Namibia ===
Floods killed two children and an additional five people in a related house fire in December in Windhoek, Namibia.

=== Nigeria ===
At least 33 of the 36 states of Nigeria were affected by floods. Floods have killed at least 612 people. The floods have also caused a Cholera outbreak, killing a further 64 people.

=== Niger ===
At least 168 people have died due to flooding in Niger since August. Over 227,000 people were affected.

=== Rwanda ===
Since January 1, severe storms began across Rwanda. As of January 27, 15 people had been killed and 37 people were injured. Seven of those fatalities and 26 of the injuries were from lightning strikes.

=== Senegal ===
At least three people in Dakar killed as a result of the floods.

=== Sierra Leone ===
Eight deaths were reported in Freetown, the capital of Sierra Leone due to flooding and landslides.

=== South Africa ===
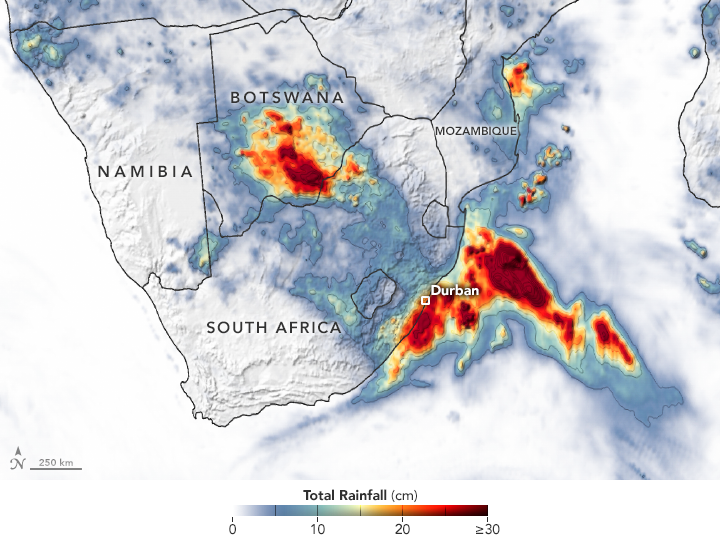
Estimated rainfall in southern Africa between 7 – 13 April 2022.

Floods affected Eastern Cape in January, killing fourteen people, including a police officer who was trying to rescue people.

In April, floods have killed at least 435 people, mostly in KwaZulu-Natal. Nearly $1.6 billion USD had been caused. Over 6,000 homes, mostly of poor construction, were damaged or destroyed by floods.

On December 3, floods affected a church in Johannesburg. Nine people were found dead and eight others were still missing.

On 20 June 2025, Toyota filed a lawsuit in South African courts 6.5 million rand, or $365 million USD, over floods that occurred in 2022 that shut down their plant near Durban. A claim filed against Transnet SOC, the KwaZulu-Natal Department of Transport, and eThekwini Municipality was brought by Toyota's insurer, Tokio Marine & Nichido Fire Insurance, in which they allege the floods, which closed the plant for four months, cost Toyota 4.5 million rand for repairs and over 2 billion rand in business.

=== Sudan ===
Flooding since August killed 134 people. Over 47,000 houses were damaged by flood water.

=== Tanzania ===
Floods in Tanzania killed five people in early May.

=== The Gambia ===
Floods in The Gambia killed at least 11 people.

=== Uganda ===
Floods in January killed 9 people in the Kisoro District. In August, floods in the Eastern Region killed a further 30 people.
