= 2022 South Africa floods =

2022 South Africa floods may refer to:

- 2022 Eastern Cape floods, in January
- 2022 KwaZulu-Natal floods, in April
