= 2022 Colombia landslides =

Natural disasters in Colombia

In January and February 2022, landslides occurred in Colombia.

== Palocabildo landslides ==
2022 Tolima landslides
- Date: 26–28 January 2022
- Location: Palocabildo, Tolima
- Cause: Rainfall
- Deaths: 2

On 26–28 January 2022, two people were killed in Palocabildo, Tolima after heavy rainfall. Many power outages were reported.

== Dosquebradas landslide ==
2022 Dosquebradas landslide
- Date: 8–9 February 2022
- Location: Dosquebradas, Risaralda
- Cause: Rainfall
- Deaths: 14
- Property damage: 5 homes

On 8 February 2022, in Dosquebradas, Risaralda, heavy rains caused a landslide, killing at least 14 people and destroying five homes. 35 people were hospitalized.

== See also ==
- Weather of 2022
