= Weather of 2022 =

The following is a list of weather events that occurred on Earth in the year 2022. The year began with a La Niña. There were several natural disasters around the world from various types of weather, including blizzards, cold waves, droughts, heat waves, wildfires, floods, tornadoes, and tropical cyclones. The deadliest weather event of the year were the European heat waves, which killed over 26,000 people, 11,000 of which were in France. The costliest weather event of the year was Hurricane Ian, which caused at least $112 billion in damages in Florida and Cuba. Another significant weather event was the Pakistan floods, which killed 1,739 people and a total of $14.9 billion in damages.

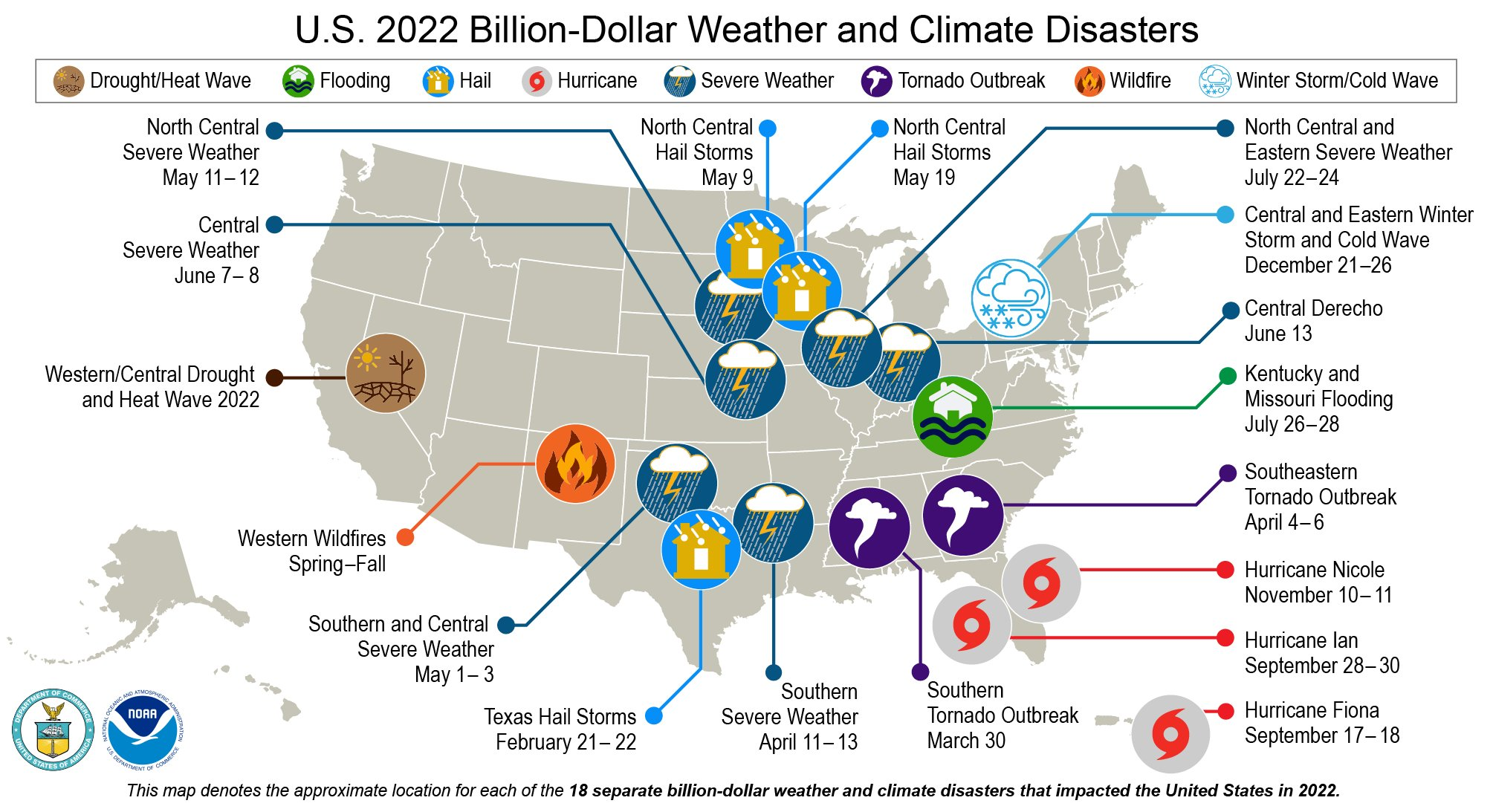
The 18 weather/climate disaster events in the United States with losses exceeding $1 billion in 2022

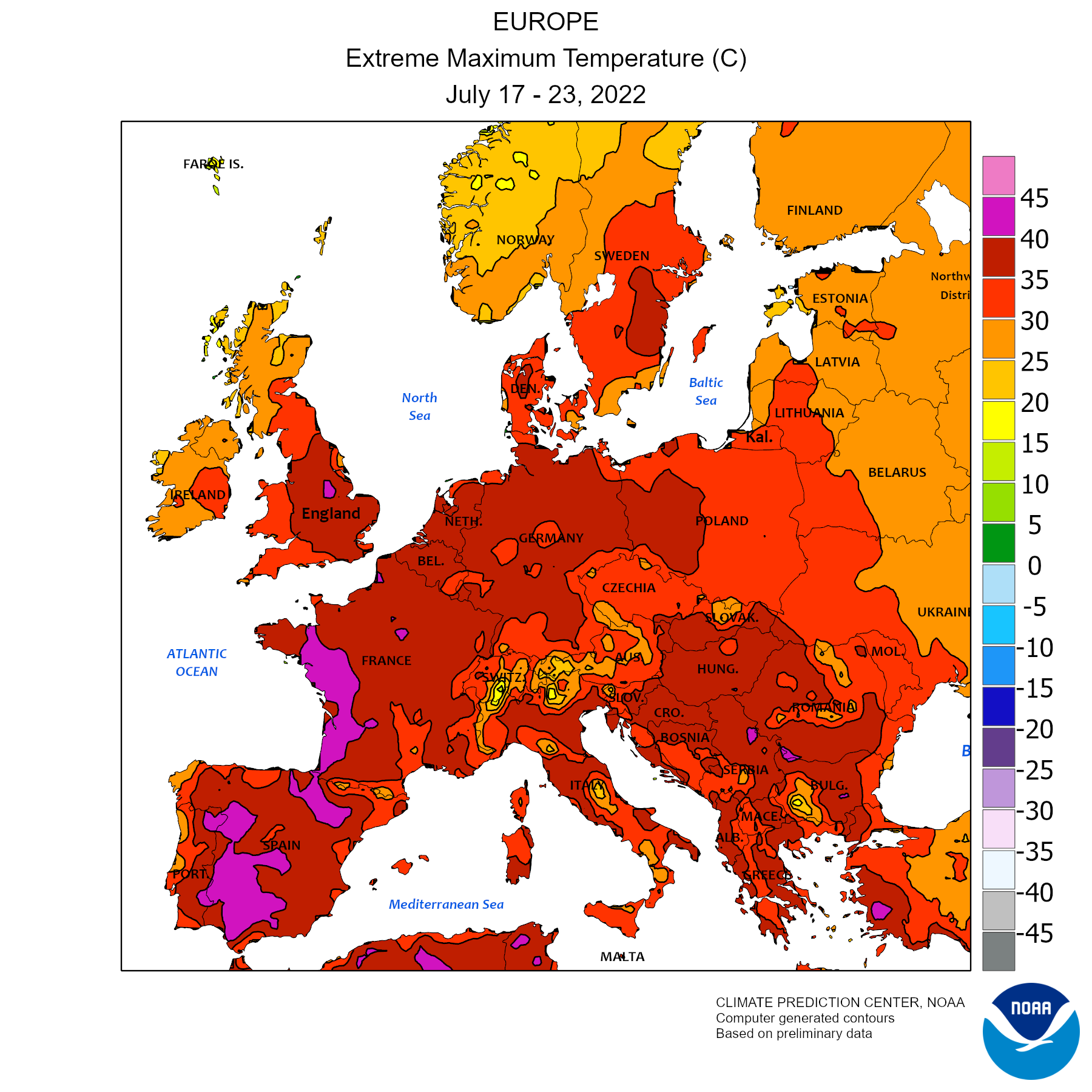
Temperatures in Europe from July 17 to 23, showing temperatures upwards of 40 °C (104 °F).

== Deadliest events ==
Deadliest meteorological events during 2022
Rank	Event	Date(s)	Deaths (+Missing)	Refs
1	European heat waves	June 12–September 12	68,000+	
2	Pakistan floods	June 14–October	1,739	
3	Afghanistan floods	May—August	670	
4	Nigeria floods	May—October	612	
5	KwaZulu-Natal floods	April 8–21	435	
6	Petrópolis floods	February 15	231	
7	Tropical Storm Megi	April 8–12	214 (+132 missing)	
8	Kinshasa floods	December 12–13	169	
9	Tropical Storm Nalgae	October 26-November 3	164 (+28 missing)	
10	Hurricane Ian	September 23-October 1, 2022	161	

== Types ==
=== Cold snaps and winter storms ===
On January 8, a snowstorm in Pakistan caused 23 deaths.

Three significant winter storms affected North America two at the beginning of the year, one in the middle of January that killed five and one in early February that killed eight, and the other at the end of year in December of 2022 that killed at least 50.

Southern Ontario saw the second snowiest day during the January storm, with schools and airports shutting down. The storm also spawned a brief EF2 tornado, causing several injuries and significant damage in Iona, Florida.

2 feet (0.61 m) of snow fell near Colorado Springs, Colorado during the February winter storm, which also produced several tornadoes, one of which caused a death. As the storm passed, the temperature dropped dramatically in places such as New York City.

Less significant events also occurred throughout the winter. On January 3–4, a winter storm caused five deaths, and a 24 hour-long-traffic jam on Interstate 95 in Virginia. On January 22, Canaan, West Virginia set a new all-time record low. The cold wave behind it results in five deaths. On January 21, a winter storm killed one person in North Carolina when an ambulance slid off the road. A late January blizzard dumps massive snowfall, especially over Boston, and results in four deaths on Long Island. In late February, a winter storm kills two people: one each in Tennessee and Kentucky. On March 28, during a record breaking cold snap, a snow squall on Interstate 81 in Pennsylvania causes six deaths. Another blizzard occurred in mid April, causing one death in North Dakota.

=== Heat waves and droughts ===
Temperatures reached record-breaking highs when they were reported at 50.7 °C (123.3 °F) in Onslow, Western Australia, 114 °F (46 °C) in Phoenix, Arizona, 116 °F (47 °C) in Sacramento. China experienced the worst heat wave in world history during the summer of 2022. Heat waves in India and Pakistan in the spring caused 90 deaths. North America also had significant heat waves, which caused 19 deaths in July alone. Both July and August saw the warmest daily minimums on record in the United States. The heat wave in California in September nearly broke the power grid. In Japan, June saw record-breaking temperatures, with the 40 °C (104 °F) threshold beating the previous record set in 2011. Heat waves in Europe cause 11,000 deaths in France alone. In Antarctica, rain fell on part of the continent, and one province set a monthly record high of 5.6 °C (42.1 °F).

Summer in the United States featured a long-lasting heat wave, which led to 117 deaths and $9.3 billion in damage. October 2022 was the hottest on record for Washington State.

=== Tornadoes ===
During 2022, 28 tornadoes were rated F3/EF3 or higher, with four of those receiving a rating of EF4; twenty EF3 tornadoes and four EF4 tornadoes occurred in the United States, two EF3 tornadoes occurred in China, one F3 occurred in Ukraine and one F3/EF3/T6 occurred in France and Belgium. The strongest tornado of 2022 impacted Pembroke and Black Creek in Georgia at EF4 intensity, with winds estimated at 185 miles per hour (298 km/h).

Worldwide, 33 tornado-related deaths have been confirmed: 24 in the United States, three in China, two each in Poland and Russia, and one each in the Netherlands and Ukraine.

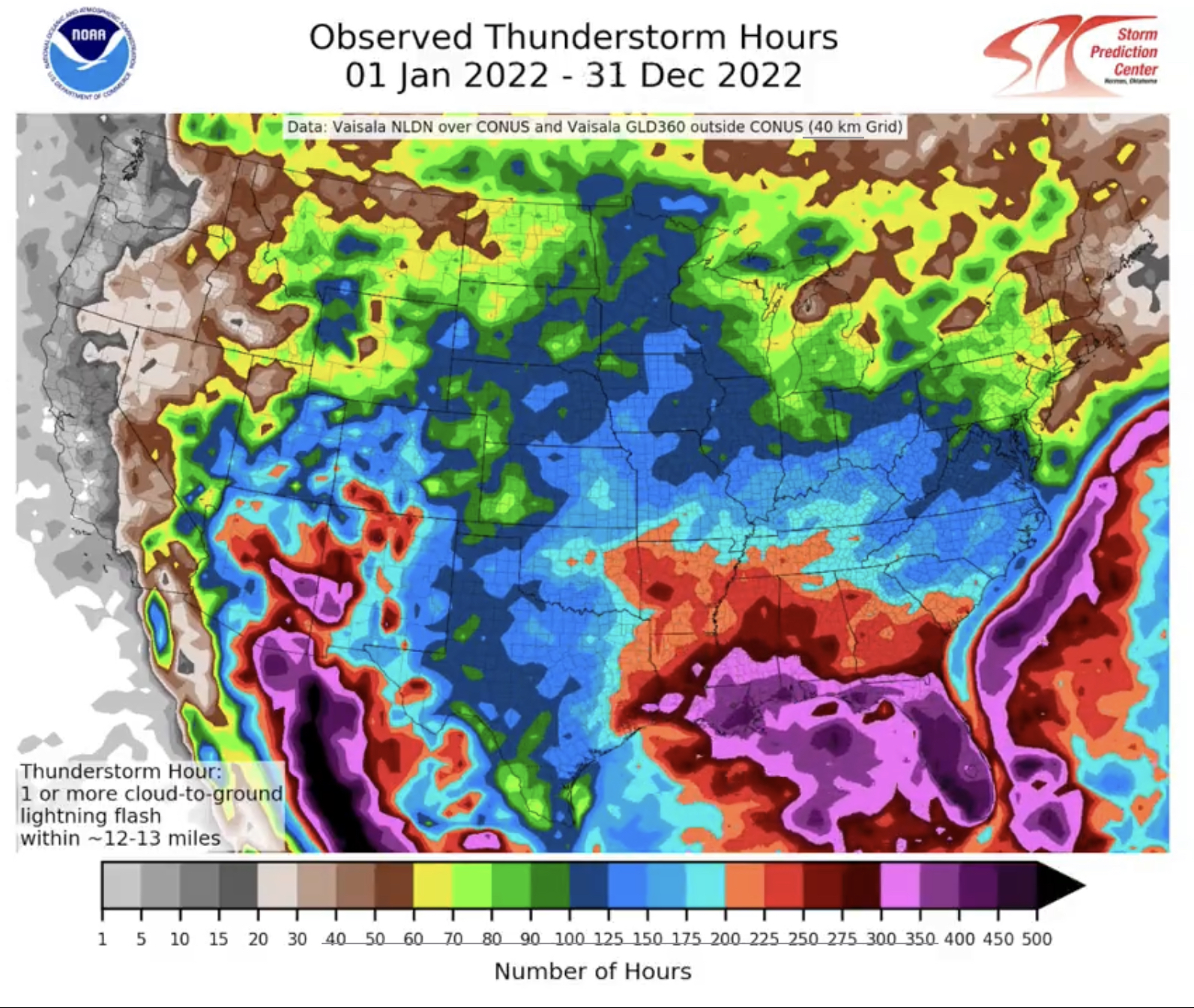
The Observed Thunderstorm Hours across the United States in 2022

The first tornadic fatality of the year occurred on February 3, when an EF2 tornado struck Sawyerville, Alabama, killing one person. A tornado outbreak occurred in Poland with at least 11 tornadoes on February 17, resulting in 2 fatalities and 5 injuries. 6 of the 11 tornadoes have been rated F2.

March saw a record number of tornadoes and 3 major outbreaks: 5-7, 21-23, and 29-31. The first tornado outbreak, despite being the smallest, is the deadliest tornado outbreak of 2022, causing 7 deaths of which six were in a low-end EF4 tornado that also caused 5 injuries and $220 million. The next tornado outbreak caused 3 deaths, plus 3 due to flash flooding in Alabama and one indirect death due to the 2022 New Orleans tornado. This EF3 tornado causes direct and indirect death, at least two injuries, and $32.5 million in damage, as well as 16,000 power outages. The final tornado outbreak is the largest, causing 90 tornadoes. It also causes 3 fatalities. An EF3 tornado in Florida early on March 31 caused two fatalities. Total damage from the storm reached $1.3 billion.

In April, tornadic activity died down a bit, but still featured a tornado outbreak of 87 tornadoes early in the month. That outbreak caused a tornadic death due to an EF4 tornado in Georgia. A storm complex in mid-April also results in a large tornado outbreak, but without fatalities. An EF3 tornado in Texas caused 23 injuries and $100,000 in damage. On April 29, an EF3 tornado near Andover, Kansas caused $41.5 million.

Tornadic activity slowed significantly after April. However, a significant tornado outbreak did occur across the US and Canada in mid to late May. This included an EF3 tornado in Gaylord, Michigan that caused 2 deaths, 44 injuries and $50.175 million in damage. The storm also helps fuel the May 2022 Canadian derecho that causes 11 deaths. A day before, a European tornado outbreak spawns 9 tornadoes that result in 46 injuries. After that, the next significant outbreak isn't for two months, until July 20. A tornado outbreak in China caused 3 deaths and 26 injuries.

=== Tropical and subtropical cyclones ===
Each of 2022's costliest climate-related disasters cost at least $3 billion.

On January 5, a tropical disturbance which was designated as 03F formed and was named Cyclone Cody, making it the first system of 2022. Cyclone Tiffany, the second named system of 2022, formed in the Australian region on January 9 and a tropical low designated as 11U formed on January 13, as a second system. On January 20, Tropical Storm Ana formed, which caused 142 deaths and $25 million across Madagascar, Malawi and Mozambique due to heavy rainfall and flooding. In the first week of February, Cyclone Batsirai exaggerated Ana's impacts, causing an additional 123 deaths and $190 million in damage. On February 14, Tropical Storm Dumako caused 14 more deaths in Madagascar, On February 23, Cyclone Emnati caused 15 more deaths in Madagascar. In March, Cyclone Gombe caused 72 deaths, with 63 in Mozambique, 7 in Malawi, and 2 in Madagascar. In the South Pacific in early February, Cyclone Dovi caused over $80 million in damages and 1 death across New Caledonia, Vanuatu, Norfolk Island, and New Zealand. In April, Tropical Storm Megi caused severe flooding that resulted in 214 deaths with 132 still missing. At the same time, Typhoon Malakas became a Category 4-equivalent typhoon out to sea. In May, Severe Cyclonic Storm Asani caused significant damage and 3 casualties over southern India in early May with 100 km/h (65 mph) winds. Also in May, Hurricane Agatha made landfall in southern Mexico as a Category 2 hurricane on May 30 with 175 km/h (110 mph) winds, causing 9 deaths and $327 million in damage.

=== Extratropical cyclones and European windstorms ===
On January 10, the Hellenic National Meteorological Service named Storm Diomedes, making it the first European Windstorm of the year. The storm killed 1 person, and 1 person remains missing. 11 days later, on January 21, Storm Elpis formed, 3 people were killed and 18 injured after thousands were trapped by a snowstorm in Turkey. On January 28–30, Storm Malik hit Europe, killing 6 People. 2 people died in the United Kingdom, and 1 person died in Denmark, Germany, Poland and the Czech Republic. Over 29 people were killed across Europe when European Windstorms Dudley and Eunice made landfall on February 16–17 (Dudley) and February 18 (Eunice).

=== Wildfires ===
The first deadly wildfire of the year was the Boulder County fires, which started in 2021 and finished on January 1, 2022.

Following the Russian invasion of Ukraine, around 10,000 hectares of forest fires are currently burning near the Chernobyl Exclusion Zone, releasing radioactive air.

During the year, wildfires have caused at least $260,849,000 (2022 USD) in damage in the United States.

== Timeline ==
This is a timeline of weather events during 2022.

=== January ===
In January 2022, the National Oceanic and Atmospheric Administration documented 13 weather-related fatalities and 18 weather-related injuries in the United States and Territories of the United States.

- December 16, 2021 – January 19, 2022 – Floods in Malaysia, locally called Banjir Shah Alam, caused by Tropical Depression 29W, killed 54 people with two missing and caused over $4.77 billion (2021 USD).
- December 24, 2021 – January 6, 2022 – Tropical Cyclone Seth killed two people and caused severe flooding in southeastern Queensland.
- December 30, 2021 – January 1, 2022 – Grass fires in Boulder County, Colorado killed one person, left one person missing and injured six others. Wind gusts of 115 miles per hour (185 km/h) were reported and the fire destroyed 1,084 structures and caused $513 million (2022 USD) in damage.
- December 31, 2021 – January 6, 2022 – Floods in Oman killed at least six people.
- January 1–4 – A winter storm, unofficially named Winter Storm Frida by The Weather Channel, killed five people, caused 428,000 power outages, and caused damage across the United States and Iceland.
- January 1–27 – Severe storms and floods in Rwanda killed 15 people and injured 37 others. Seven of the fatalities and 26 of the injuries occurred due to lightning.
- January 3 – A landslide in China killed four people, injured three others, and left nine missing.
- January 4 – Floods in Indonesia killed nine people.
- January 5–13 – Cyclone Cody killed one person and caused over $25 million (2022 USD) in damage across Fiji.

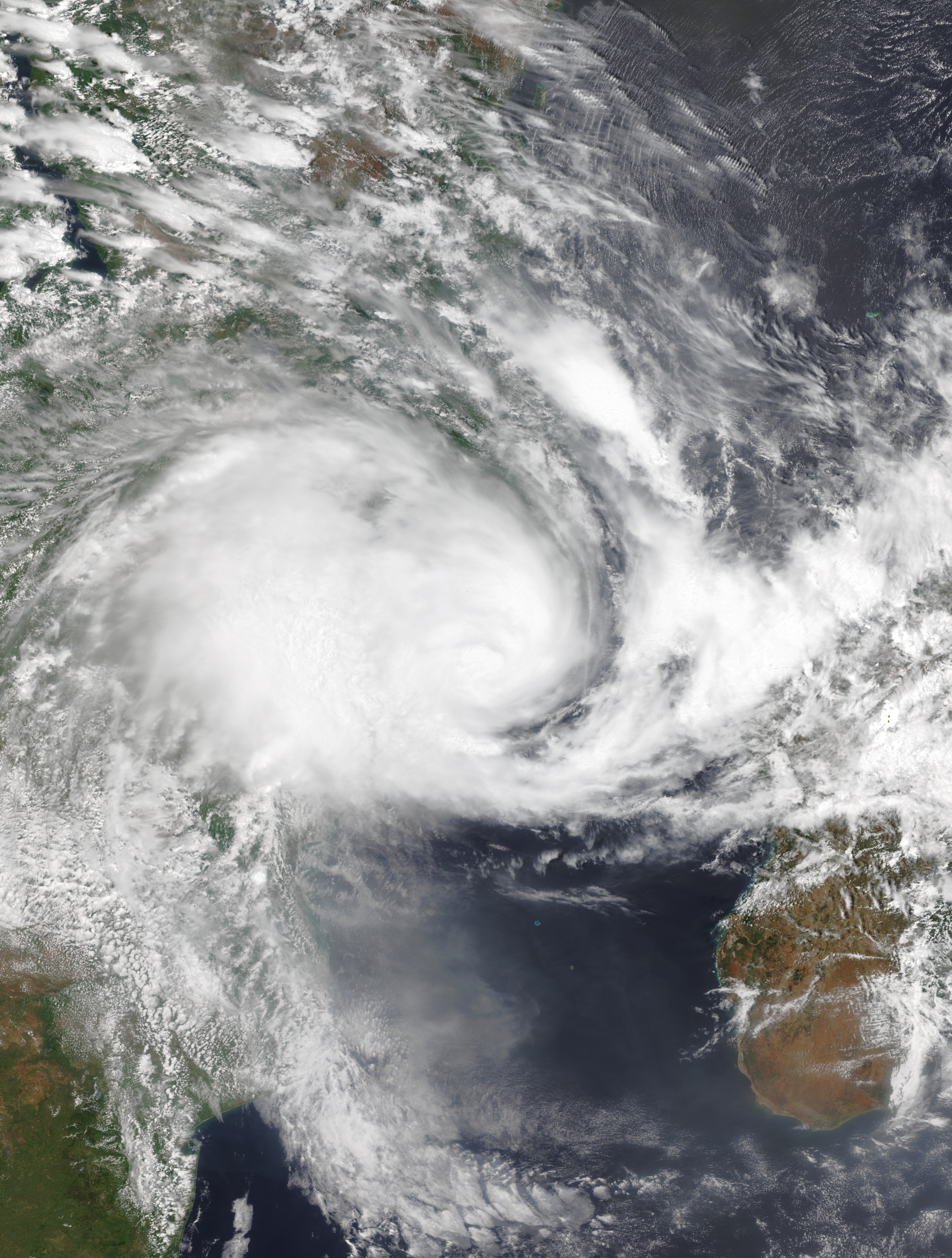
Tropical Storm Ana at landfall in Mozambique on January 24.

- January 5 - Freezing rain leads to traffic accidents in the New York Metropolitan Area, causing two deaths and causing several delays, as well as closing New York State Route 25A.
- January 7–8 – A blizzard in Murree, Pakistan killed 23 people.
- January 8 – A rock collapse in Capitólio, Minas Gerais, Brazil, caused by heavy rains, killed ten people and injured 32 others.
- January 10 – Floods in East London, South Africa killed 14 people and left hundreds homeless.
- January 10–14 – European Windstorm Diomedes killed one person, with one missing, and caused damage across Greece.
- January 11 – A 37-year-old man was injured by a lightning strike in Greece.
- January 13–19 – A major winter storm, unofficially named Winter Storm Izzy by The Weather Channel, killed five people, injured 17 others, caused over 375,000 power outages, and caused damage across Canada and the United States.
  - January 16 – The storm system produced six tornadoes in Florida, including an EF2 tornado that caused major damage to three mobile home parks near Fort Myers and injured three people.
  - January 17 – Ottawa, Canada, recorded 48 centimetres (19 in) of snow, which is the second-largest snowstorm on record for Ottawa.
  - January 17 – Toronto, Canada, recorded 33 cm of snow, which is the third largest snowfall for Toronto since 1937. The storm prompted the Meteorological Service of Canada to issue the first blizzard warning for Toronto since 1978.
- January 14 – Onslow, Western Australia recorded a temperature of 50.7 °C (123.3 °F), which if verified, would be tied as the highest in the Southern Hemisphere.
- January 18 – Floods in Antananarivo, Madagascar, killed 11 people and left 500 people homeless.
- January 19 – An avalanche in Slovakia killed one person and injured one other.
- January 20–29 – Five people die in a cold wave across North America. Four people die of hypothermia near Emerson, Manitoba, Canada. Meanwhile, a fifth person dies in Upstate New York.
- January 20 – René Robert, a Swiss photographer, died from hypothermia in Paris.
- January 20 – A series of ice accumulation resulted in 23 injuries in Germany.
- January 20–23 – Heavy rains in Pakistan killed eight people from multiple landslides and building collapses.
- January 20–25 – Tropical Storm Ana killed 142 people and caused over $25 million (2022 USD) in damage across Madagascar, Mozambique, Malawi, South Africa, and Zimbabwe.
- January 21 – An avalanche in Switzerland killed one person.
- January 21–27 – European Windstorm Elpis becomes a rare snowstorm that killed three people and injured 18 others while affecting Greece, Cyprus, Israel, and Turkey. The storm also spawned a rare landspout which later became a snownado.
- January 24 – A series of flash floods in Uganda killed nine people.
- January 24 – February 11 – Cyclone Batsirai killed 123 people, injured at least ten others, caused 43,500 power outages and caused at least $190 million (2022 USD) in damage across Madagascar, Mauritius and Réunion.
- January 26 – A landslide in Colombia killed two people.
- January 27 – An avalanche in Turkey killed two people.
- January 27–30 – A nor’easter and blizzard, unofficially named Winter Storm Kenan by The Weather Channel and Blizzard of 2022 by NBC News Boston, killed four people (2 direct and 2 indirect) and caused over 118,000 power outages across the East Coast of the United States.
  - January 29 – Providence, Rhode Island set a new all-time daily snowfall record of 18.8 inches (48 cm), breaking the previous record of 18.3 inches (46 cm) from February 4, 1961.
  - January 29 – Boston, Massachusetts, recorded its snowiest day in January on record, and also tied its all-time daily snowfall record set on 17 February 2003, with 23.6 inches (60 cm) of snow falling.
- January 28 – A person dies from a cold weather-related incident in New York.
- January 28–30 – European Windstorm Malik, also known as Storm Valtteri and Storm Nadia, killed six people, caused 810,000 power outages and caused damage across the United Kingdom, Ireland, Denmark, Norway, Sweden, Finland, Latvia, Estonia, Germany, Poland, and the Czech Republic.
- January 28 – February 3 – Floods and landslides in Brazil killed 28 people.
- January 29 – Two avalanches in the Polish side of the Tatra Mountains killed two people.
- January 31 – The World Meteorological Organization certified a 477.2-mile-long lightning strike, also dubbed "megaflash", over the southern United States on April 29, 2020, as a new world record for the longest-lightning strike.
- January 31 – The World Meteorological Organization certified a 17.1-second-long lightning strike over Uruguay and northern Argentina on June 18, 2020, as a new world record for the longest lasting lightning strike.
- January 31 – February 1 – A landslide and floods in Ecuador killed 24 people with nine missing, and injured 47 others.
- January 31 – February 1 – Floods in Haiti killed five people with one missing.

=== February ===
In February 2022, the National Oceanic and Atmospheric Administration documented 19 weather-related fatalities and 28 weather-related injuries in the United States and Territories of the United States.

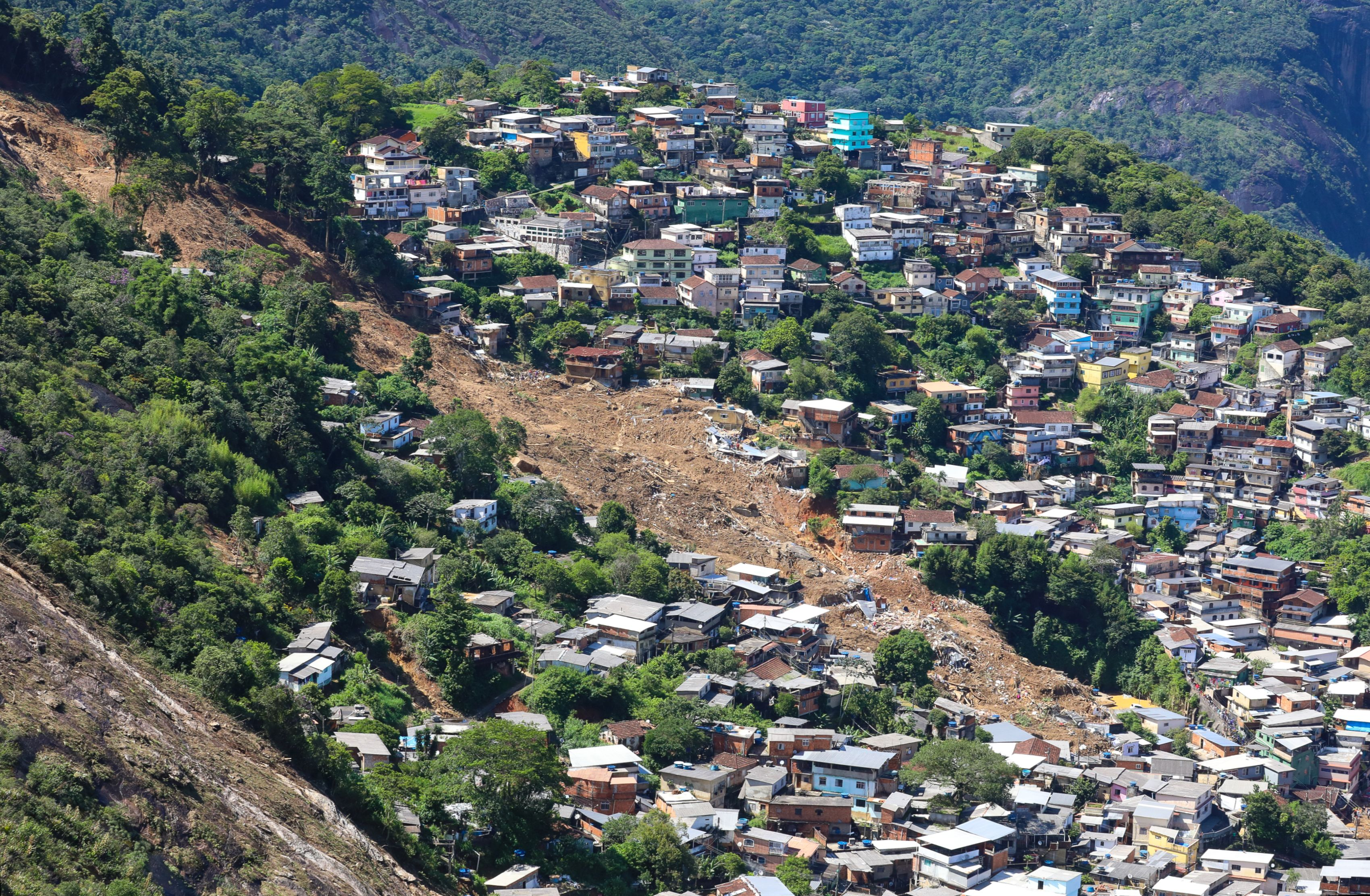
Aftermath of devastating floods in Petrópolis on February 15.

- February 1 – A landslide in Mozambique killed five people and injured two others.
- February 1–9 – A winter storm and ice storm, unofficially named Winter Storm Landon and Groundhog Snowstorm, killed eight people (7 winter storms and 1 tornadic), caused over 375,000 power outages, and caused damage across the Central and Midwestern United States and Northern Mexico. Multiple states declared a state of emergency in preparation for the winter storm.
  - February 3 – The storm system also produced five tornadoes including three EF2 tornadoes. The second EF2 tornado, which prompted the National Weather Service to issue a particularly dangerous situation tornado warning, killed one person and caused damage in Sawyerville, Alabama.
  - February 3 – Wichita Falls, Texas recorded a new daily record snowfall of 1.0 inches, breaking the previous daily snowfall record from 1956.
- February 2 – A power cable collapse in the Democratic Republic of the Congo killed at least 26 people. The cause is unknown, but lightning is the suspected cause.
- February 2 – Twelve people died from hypothermia in Turkey, during a cold wave.
- February 3 – A geomagnetic storm impacted the areas around the Arctic Ocean and disrupted up to 40 new SpaceX Starlink satellites that were launched earlier in the day. The storm also caused the Space Weather Prediction Center (SWPC) to issue a G1 geomagnetic storm warning.
- February 4 – A series of avalanches killed eight people in Austria.
- February 5 – An avalanche killed one person and injured four others in Austria.
- February 5 – An avalanche killed one person in Italy.
- February 7 – An avalanche killed two people in France.
- February 7 – An avalanche killed 19 people in Afghanistan.
- February 7 – A landslide in the Democratic Republic of the Congo killed three people and injured one other.
- February 8 – A landslide in Colombia killed 14 people.
- February 8–13 – Multiple cities in central and southern California, including San Francisco, Sacramento, Los Angeles, and San Diego experienced a record-breaking heat wave. San Francisco recorded 78 °F on February 10, an all-time record for the city for meteorological winter.
- February 10–18 – Tropical Storm Dumako killed 14 people and caused over $1 million (2022 USD) in damage across Madagascar.
- February 13–14 – A series of floods in Oman killed one person.
- February 13–15 – A series of floods in Indonesia killed one person and affected over 10,000 people.
- February 14–19 – European Windstorm Dudley killed nine people (7 extratropical cyclonic + 2 tornadic), injured five others, caused 225,000 power outages, and caused damage across Europe. Storm Dudley also spawned a tornado outbreak consisting of 24 tornadoes, with 23 in Poland and Germany and one in Italy. One of the tornadoes in Poland killed two people.
- February 14–19 – European Windstorm Eunice, also known as Storm Zeynep in Germany and Storm Nora in Denmark, killed 17 people, caused over 2.4 million power outages, and caused over €1.3 billion (2021 EUR) in damage across Belgium, Denmark, France, Germany, Ireland, Lithuania, the Netherlands, Poland, and the United Kingdom.
- February 15 – Harsh weather over the Atlantic Ocean killed 21 people, with 11 missing, after capsizing a Spanish fishing boat.
- February 15 – A series of floods in Rio de Janeiro killed at least 231 people with five missing.
- February 15–26 – Cyclone Emnati killed 15 people and caused over $1 million (2022 USD) in damage across Madagascar, Mauritius and Réunion.
- February 18 – Floods in South Africa killed one person.
- February 20–22 – European Windstorm Franklin killed two people and caused damage across the United Kingdom, Ireland, France, and the Netherlands.
- February 20–22 – A winter storm in Japan killed one person and injured eight others.
- February 20–24 – A series of floods and landslides in Bolivia killed 35 people and left 25 missing.
- February 22 – Heavy rain caused mass floods that killed many people and hundreds of homes in Bukavu, Democratic Republic of the Congo.
- February 22 – A winter storm in Minnesota, United States, killed one person.
- February 23 – A landslide in Colombia killed three people and injured four others.
- February 23- April 7 – A series of major floods in South East Queensland, and Northern Rivers, New South Wales in Australia killed 22 people and caused over $2.2 Billion in Damages to infrastructure and homes in the state of Queensland alone. Brisbane city recorded a record 678.8mm of rain over three days. This became the most expensive natural disaster in Australian history, with $3.5 billion worth of claims paid out by insurers.
- February 24 – A winter storm in the Southeastern United States killed seven people.
- February 27 – A landslide in Colombia killed one person.

=== March ===
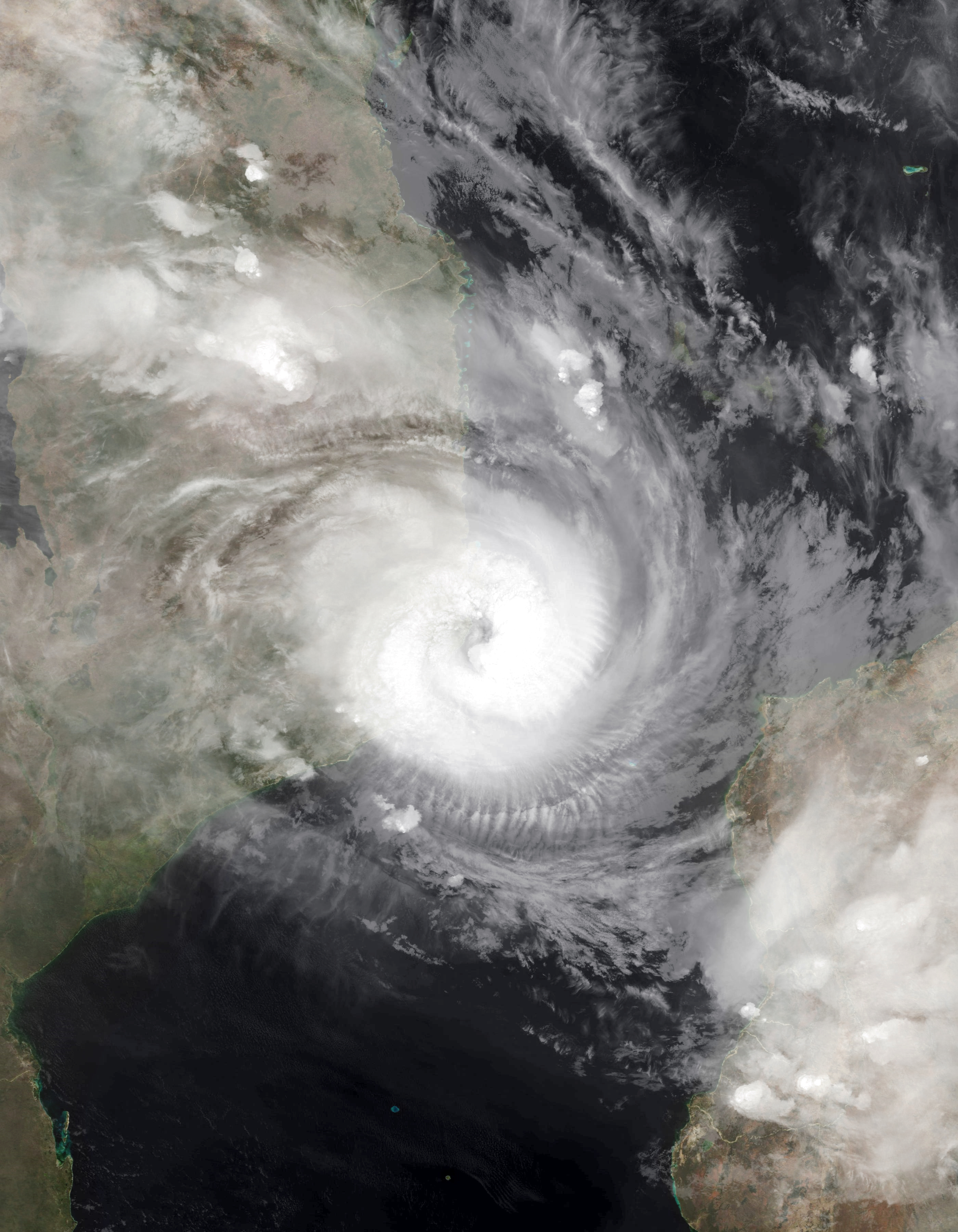
Cyclone Gombe shortly before its landfall in Mozambique on March 10

In March 2022, the National Oceanic and Atmospheric Administration documented 39 weather-related fatalities and 110 weather-related injuries in the United States and Territories of the United States.

- March - April 29 - A heat wave affects India and Pakistan. Temperatures exceed more than 50 °C (122 °F) and at least 90 people have died.
- March 2 – A series of floods in Indonesia killed two people.
- March 5–7 – A tornado outbreak across the Midwestern United States killed seven people from 29 tornadoes, including a low-end EF4 tornado with winds of 170 mph (270 km/h) near Winterset, Iowa that traveled nearly 70 miles, with the National Weather Service issuing multiple particularly dangerous situation (PDS) tornado warnings. Damage totaled up to $1 billion.
- March 5–17 – Cyclone Gombe killed 72 people, with one missing, and caused over $95 million (2022 USD) in damage across Madagascar, Mozambique, and Malawi.
- March 13–14 – A G2 geomagnetic storm impacted the areas around the Arctic Ocean.
- March 17 – Dense fog on I-57 in Missouri causes a chain reaction of crashes that killed six people.
- March 21–23 – A tornado outbreak and flash flooding event in the Southern and Eastern United States killed five people, two tornadic and 3 non-tornadic, and caused $47.7 million in damage. Roughly 75 tornadoes were confirmed, including an EF3 tornado that hit the eastern part of the New Orleans metropolitan area and numerous tornadoes across Texas and Mississippi.
- March 28 - A late-season cold snap sets record-low temperatures in the Northern United States. It also triggers a snow squall along Interstate 81, in Schuylkill County, Pennsylvania in killing 6.
- March 29–31 – A tornado outbreak across the Southern United States produces many high wind warnings, as well as many tornado warnings. The tornado outbreak caused 3 deaths and $1.3 billion in damage.
- March 29–31 – Tropical Depression 01W killed 6 people and caused damage across Vietnam.

=== April ===
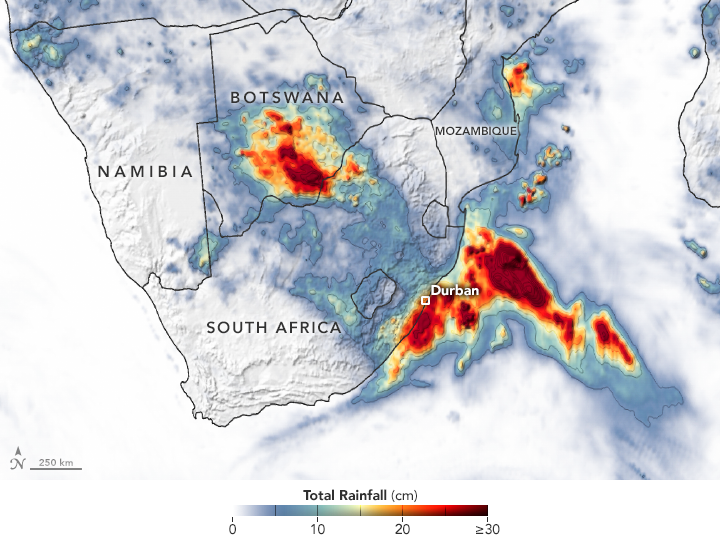
Satellite-based map provided by NASA of the rainfall totals recorded in Southern Africa between April 7–13, 2022

In April 2022, the National Oceanic and Atmospheric Administration documented 20 weather-related fatalities and 72 weather-related injuries in the United States and Territories of the United States.

- April 4–7 – A large tornado outbreak in the Southeastern United States produced 89 tornadoes, high winds, tornado warnings, one tornado emergency, and three deaths (one tornadic from an EF4 tornado in Black Creek, Georgia and two non-tornadic). Damage accumulated to $1.3 billion.
- April 6 - McAllen, Texas soared to 109 °F (43 °C), their warmest ever April temperature and 3rd warmest temperature for any month.
- April 8–13 – Tropical Storm Megi killed 214 people, with 132 missing and caused over $90.8 million (2022 USD) in damage across Philippines.
- April 8–21 – Severe floods killed 435 people and caused over $1.57 billion (2022 USD) in damage across South Africa.
- April 11–14 - A storm complex caused 2 non tornadic fatalities, 28 tornadic injuries and $2.2 billion in damage.
- April 12 – May 7 - The McBride Fire burns across New Mexico, killing two.
- April 18–19 - A nor’easter in the Northeastern United States kills one person.
- April 29 - During a tornado outbreak, after a storm chase of the EF3 tornado in Andover, Kansas, 3 storm chasers die when their car skids off the road due to hydroplaning and an oncoming vehicle crushes them.

=== May ===
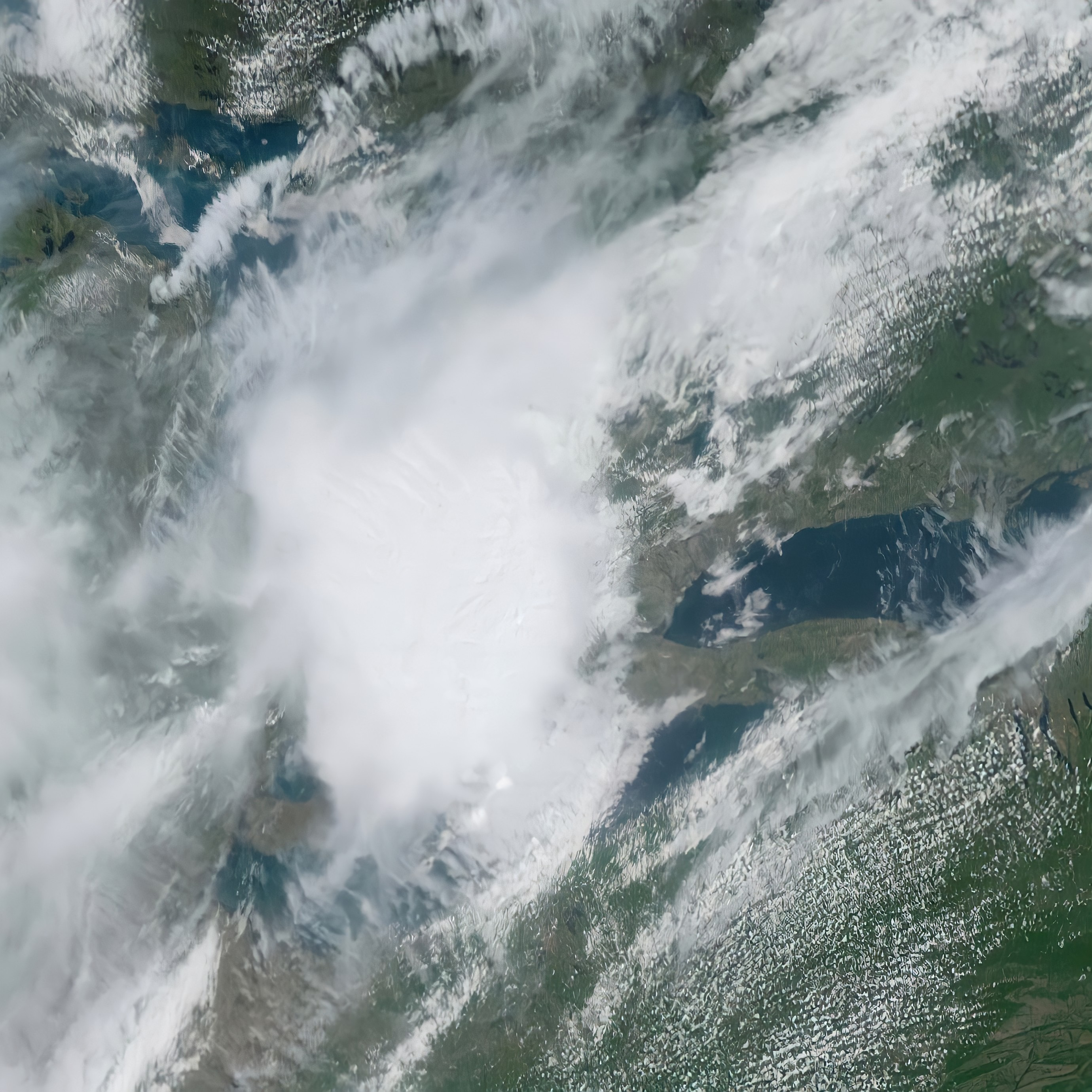
GOES-16 Imagery of a derecho going across Ontario

In May 2022, the National Oceanic and Atmospheric Administration documented 26 weather-related fatalities and 110 weather-related injuries in the United States and Territories of the United States.

- 2022 Iraq dust storms
- May 12 – A derecho in the Midwestern United States caused 5 deaths, 13 injuries and $1.3 billion in damage.
- May 14 – September 7 - Heat waves in North America kill 117 people and cause $9.3 billion in damage.
- May 20 - A severe weather and tornado outbreak causes one death and 60 injuries. Eight tornados, of which three were F2 and five F1 touched down. The cities of Lippstadt and Paderborn were struck by F2 tornadoes each.
- May 20 – An EF3 tornado in Gaylord, Michigan causes 2 deaths and 44 injuries.
- May 21 – A powerful derecho (thunderstorm and windstorm) struck a swath of Southern Ontario and western Quebec killing 10 people in Ontario and 1 Quebecer who was boating on the Ottawa River. Most of the Ontario deaths were the result of falling trees, including single fatalities in Greater Madawaska, Ottawa, Brampton, North Kawartha, Port Hope, Ganaraska Forest in Clarington, Kitchener and Peterborough with one person killed when a tree hit a trailer at Pinehurst Lake Conservation Area south of Cambridge. Winds of 132 km/h were recorded in Kitchener, while winds of 120 km/h were recorded in both Toronto and Ottawa. By Saturday evening, over 500,000 residences in Ontario and 460,000 residences in Quebec were without power due to wind and rain causing numerous trees and electricity poles to fall down. Many buildings, cars, electricity polls and hydro transmission towers across Southern Ontario (including over 800 electricity polls and four hydro transmission towers) and in parts of Quebec were damaged by falling trees and branches or by the fierce winds alone.
- May 22 – Heavy rains have caused widespread flooding in northeastern parts of Bangladesh and in the state of Assam, India, leaving millions stranded and 41 dead.
- May 28–31 – Hurricane Agatha became the strongest hurricane to make landfall along the Pacific coast of Mexico in the month of May since records began in 1949. On the afternoon of May 30, the hurricane made landfall just west of Puerto Ángel, Oaxaca, with winds of 105 mph (165 km/h). Agatha weakened rapidly as it moved inland, and soon dissipated. Heavy rain brought by the storm triggered landslides and flash flooding, killing at least 9 and leaving 6 missing in Oaxaca.

=== June ===
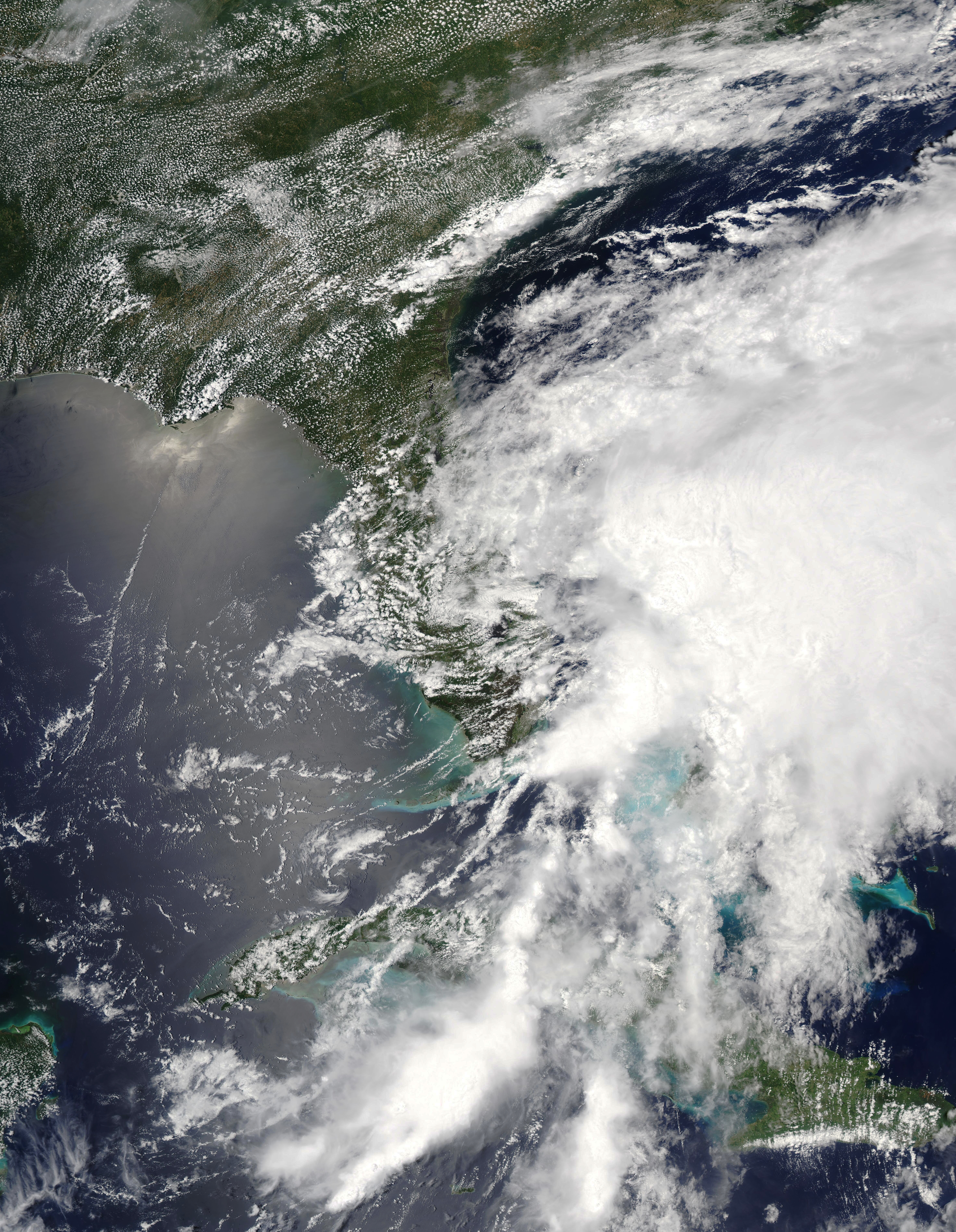
Tropical Storm Alex as a potential tropical cyclone while it was over South Florida on June 4

In June 2022, the National Oceanic and Atmospheric Administration documented 101 weather-related fatalities and 60 weather-related injuries in the United States and Territories of the United States.

- June 2–6 – Potential Tropical Cyclone One, which later became Tropical Storm Alex, strikes Cuba and Florida, killing 4 and dumping over a foot of rain. The storm caused at least $104,000 in damage.
- June 10 – The 2022 Montana floods kill one and cause $29 million, and shut down Yellowstone National Park.
- June 13–14 – The 2022 Great Lakes Derecho causes severe damage in parts of Indiana and Ohio, particularly in Fort Wayne and Holmes County, leaving more than 400,000 households in the Midwest without power. The derecho produced wind gusts of 70 to 80 mph, and a gust of 98 mph was recorded at Fort Wayne International Airport, breaking the previous record of 91 mph. A heat wave followed, worsening conditions for those without power. Many towns and villages were inaccessible until clean-up work could begin, as a result of fallen trees, power lines and other debris. Much of the damage in Ohio has been attributed to a macroburst. Three confirmed EF1 tornadoes touched down in Ohio, and at least one death occurred as a result of this storm in Indiana.
- June 14–Present — A series of flash floods in Pakistan killed over 1,100 people.
- June 19 – A man died due to hypothermia in Maine.
- June 27 – Japan saw the worst heatwave in 150 years.

=== July ===
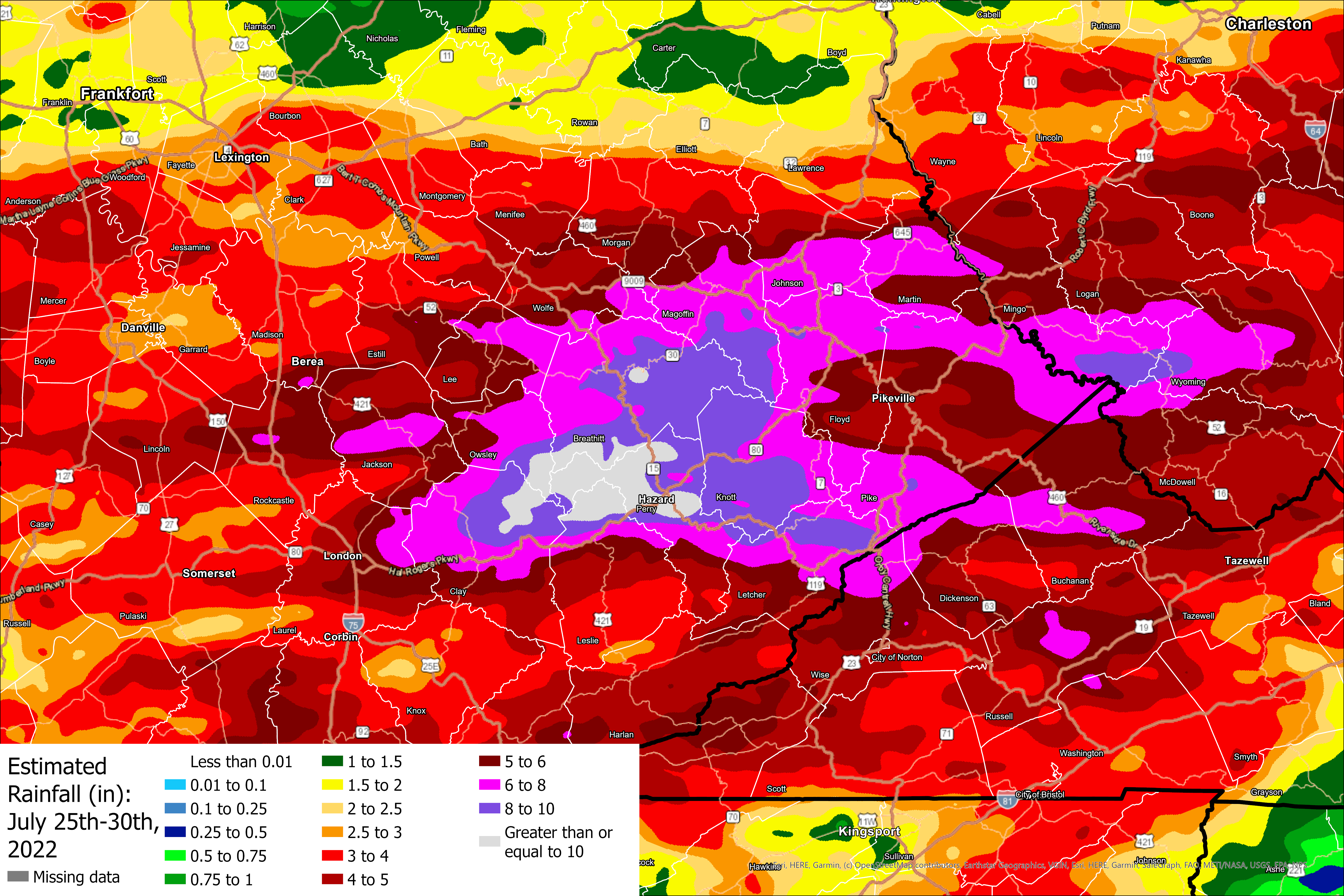
A map provided by the NWS showing of rainfall totals between July 25 and 30 in Eastern Kentucky.

In July 2022, the National Oceanic and Atmospheric Administration documented 108 weather-related fatalities and 147 weather-related injuries in the United States and Territories of the United States.

- July 3 – The 2022 Marmolada serac collapse, fueled by the European heatwave, kills 11 people and injures 8.
- July 3–8 Major flooding occurred in New South Wales, Australia. One person was killed and 85,000 were displaced.
- July 4 – Tropical Storm Colin performs a brown ocean effect by forming inland on South Carolina and killed one man, cancelling July 4 events.
- July 11 – The city of Paysandú, Uruguay was hit with a squall line with winds of up to 160 km/h. Trees were uprooted, and more than 30,000 residents suffered power outages. A newspaper building, costing about 1.2 million US dollars, was lost, along with several radio antennas. Around a thousand roofs were severely damaged or blown off.
- July 15 – High winds causing a dust storm on Interstate 90 in Montana lead to a car crash killing 6.
- July 20 – Heat records tumbled and firefighters faced new blazes as much of Western Europe baked in a gruelling heatwave.
- July 21 – China endures summer of extreme weather as record rainfall and scorching heat wave cause havoc.
- July 21 - A girl dies due to a falling tree in a severe thunderstorm in Maine.
- July 24–26 – Severe floods began in Missouri on July 24, culminating during July 25 and 26, when St. Louis broke its previous 1915 record for the most rainfall in a span of 24 hours. Governor Mike Parson declared a state of emergency on July 26. Over one hundred people were rescued from floods, and two people were killed.
- July 26 or 27 – A 7-year-old girl dies due to a falling tree in Great Smoky Mountains National Park, possibly due to flooding in the area throughout July.
- July 27–28 – Historic flooding occurred in Kentucky, with the Governor of Kentucky, Andy Beshear, declaring a state of emergency saying “We are currently experiencing one of the worst, most devastating flooding events in Kentucky's history.” More than 700 homes were flooded as a result of rainfall 600 percent more than normal. On July 29, President Joe Biden declared that a major disaster existed in Kentucky and ordered federal aid to supplement state and local recovery efforts in the areas affected by severe storms, flooding, landslides, and mudslides. At least 37 people have been killed with multiple others still missing.

=== August ===
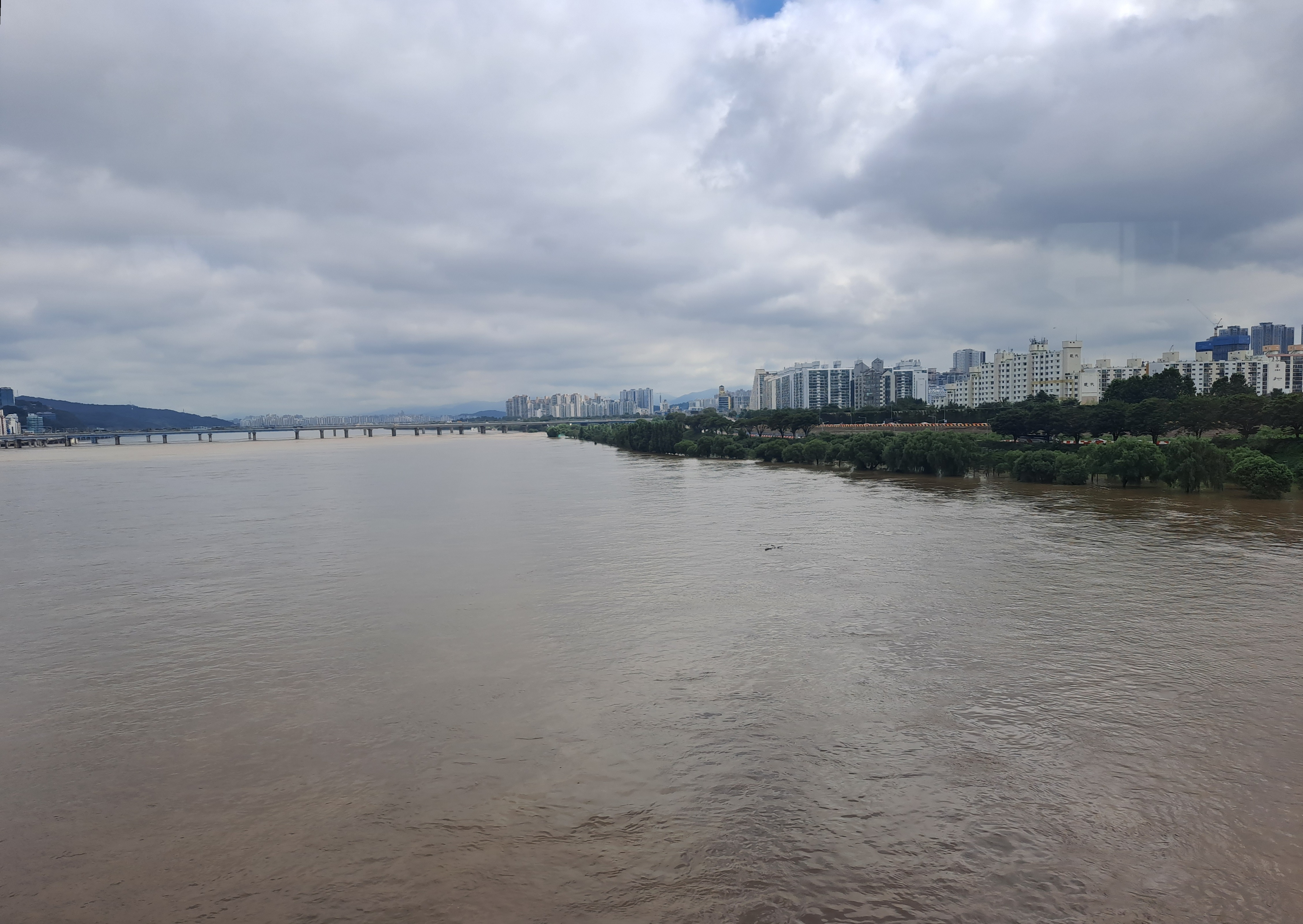
The Han River during flooding event around Seoul

In August 2022, the National Oceanic and Atmospheric Administration documented 36 weather-related fatalities and 36 weather-related injuries in the United States and Territories of the United States.

- August 1 – Floods and landslides in the Bugisu and Sebei sub-regions of Eastern Region, Uganda kill at least 10 people.
- August 4 - A lightning strike outside the White House kills three people and injures another.
- August 5 - Flash floods in Death Valley National Park resulted in more than 1,000 visitors and park staff stranded. The 1.46 inches (37 mm) of rain there was a record for August.
- August 7 - Flash flooding around Seoul, South Korea killed 9 people. Some areas of Seoul received rainfall that hadn't been seen in 80 years.
- August 9 - A thunderstorm knocks down a tree in Georgia, killing 2 people and injuring 3 others.
- 2022 European drought
- August 28 – September 6 - Typhoon Hinnamnor, known in the Philippines as Super Typhoon Henry, kills 12 with 1 missing, and causes $1.21 billion in damage around Taiwan, Philippines, South Korea, Japan, and North Korea.
- August 29 - Three people die in severe storms in the Midwest. Over 700,000 customers in Michigan lose power. Winds gusted up to 81 miles per hour (130 km/h).
- August 31 - A hailstorm in Spain resulted in one death and 50 injuries.

=== September ===
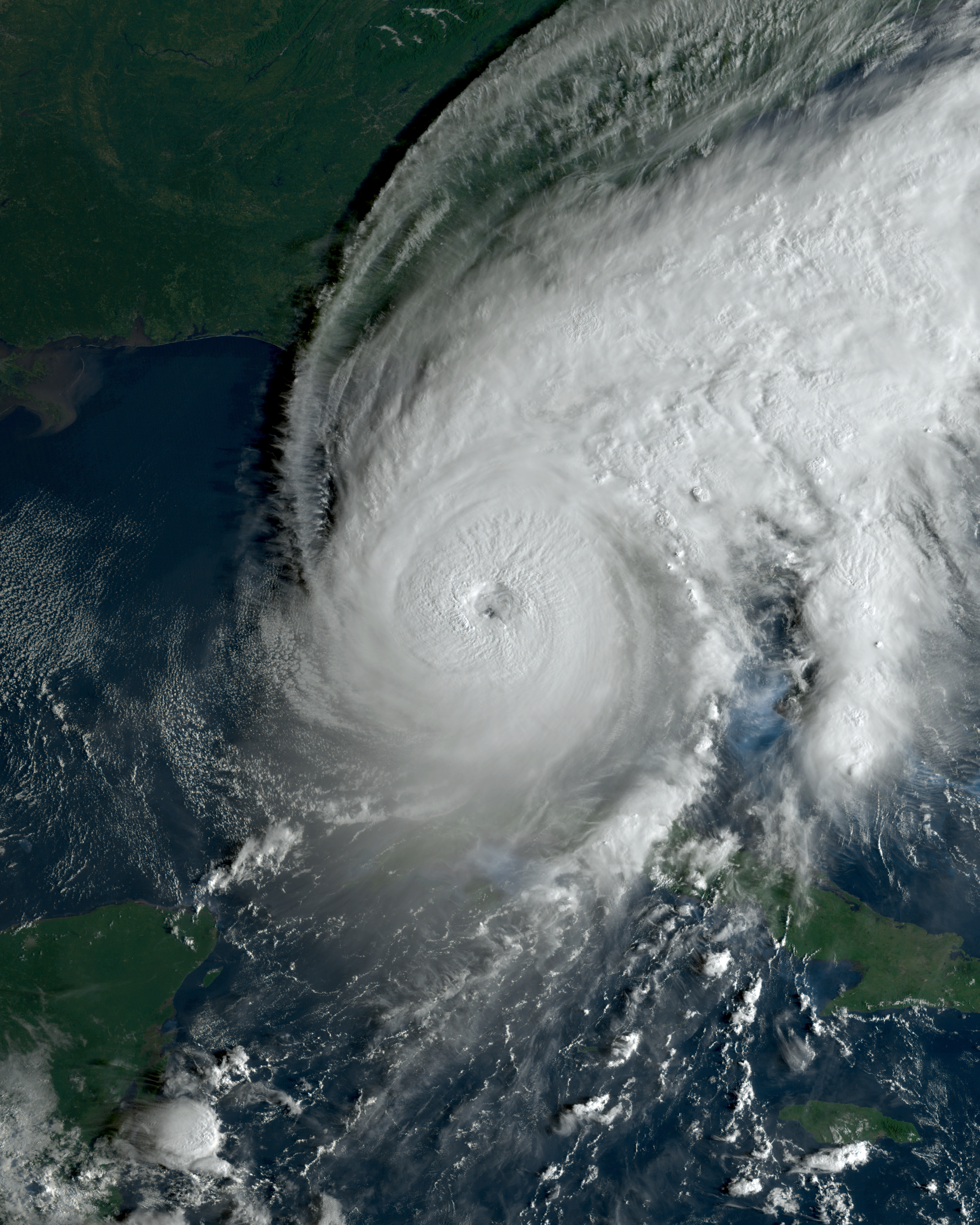
Hurricane Ian at its peak intensity while approaching Southwest Florida on September 28

In September 2022, the National Centers for Environmental Information (NCEI) documented 38 weather-related fatalities and 40 weather-related injuries in the United States and Territories of the United States. However, the National Hurricane Center recorded over 150 fatalities during the month from Hurricane Ian, indicating errors in the NCEI fatality totals for the month.

- September 1 – A temperature of 127 °F (53 °C) is recorded in Furnace Creek, California, United States, breaking the record for the highest September temperature ever recorded in the world.
- September 3 – Deadly flash flooding in Indiana kills one person.
- September 4 – During Hurricane Earl, a lightning strike kills two in Puerto Rico.
- September 4–10 – Hurricane Kay kills 4 people in Mexico.
- September 5–present – The Fairview Fire burns across California, killing two.
- September 13 — A gustnado impacts a seven mile path in Arizona. In December 2022, the National Centers for Environmental Information published its entry into the Storm Event Database. In that entry, they marked it as an EF0 tornado, stating, “A tornado formed and traveled along the leading edge of a thunderstorm outflow boundary (gustnado)”. This marks the first ever gustnado to receive a rating on the Enhanced Fujita scale.
- September 14–25 - Hurricane Fiona kills 31 people in Guadeloupe, Puerto Rico, and Canada.
- September 17–18 – Flooding in Western Alaska as a result of the passage of Extratropical Cyclone Merbok through the Aleutian Islands into the Bering Sea. Governor Mike Dunleavy declared a state of emergency in the region before the cyclone hit. The barometric pressure at the storm's center reached a low of 937 mbar (27.67 inHg) as it approached the Aleutian Islands. Dangerous storm surge inundated several coastal villages and towns. Water levels in Unalakleet peaked at around 12.5 ft (3.8 m), which was among its largest peaks on record. Significant flooding and gale force winds were also reported in Golovin, Nome, Shaktoolik and Kotlik. Despite the widespread coastal flooding no injuries were reported.
- September 21–30 - Typhoon Noru, known in the Philippines as Super Typhoon Karding, kills 40 and causes damage across Philippines and Vietnam.
- September 23 – October 2 - Hurricane Ian kills 161 people across Cuba, Florida, and North Carolina, and Virginia.

=== October ===
In October 2022, the National Centers for Environmental Information documented 3 weather-related fatalities and 7 weather-related injuries in the United States and Territories of the United States.

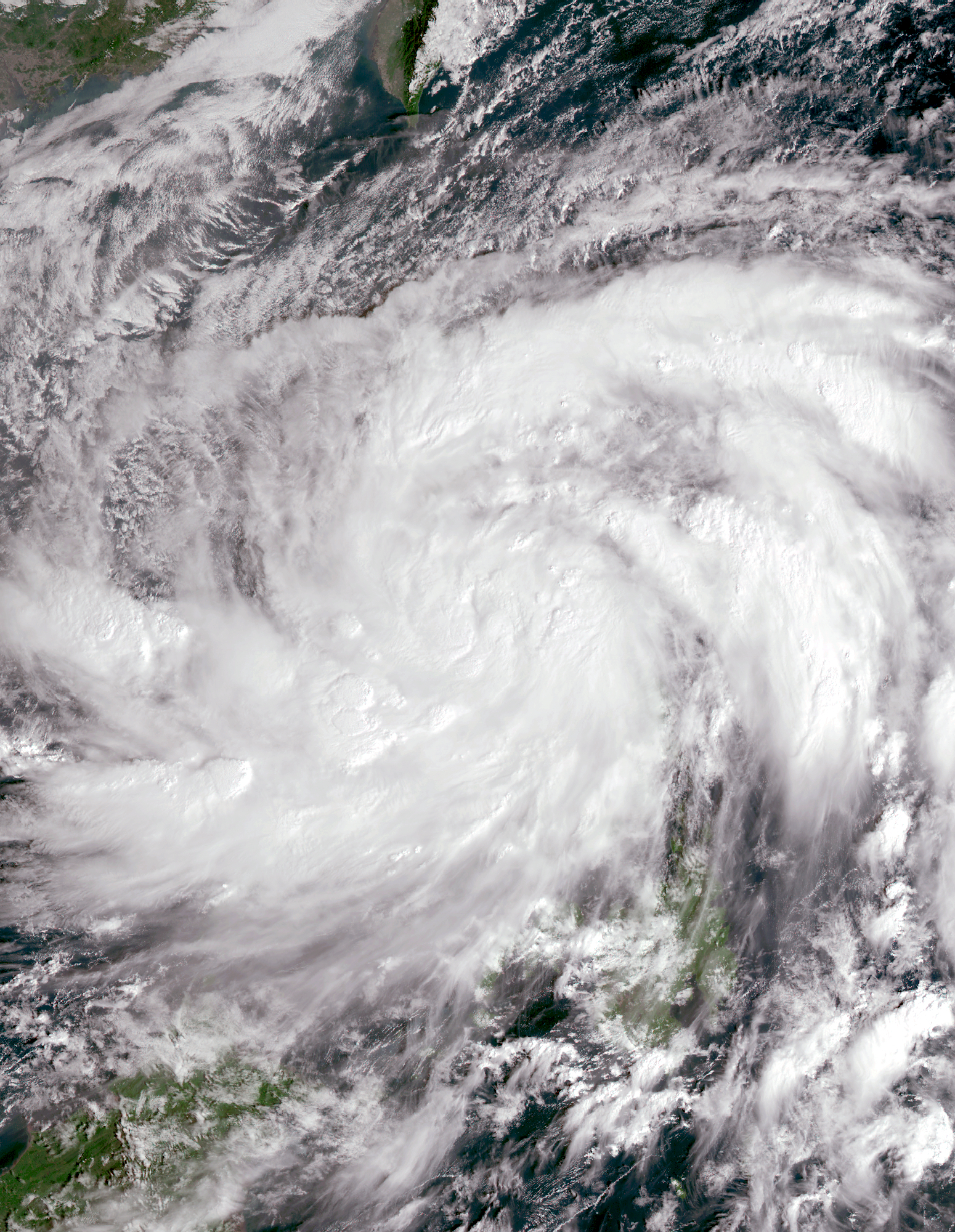
Tropical Storm Nalgae (Paeng) east of Marinduque Island, Philippines on October 31

- October 7–10 — Hurricane Julia kills 91 and causes damage across Trinidad and Tobago, Venezuela, Colombia, Nicaragua, El Salvador, Honduras, Guatemala, Panama and Mexico.
- October 9–22 – An extratropical cyclone in the Bellingshausen Sea that formed near Tonga becomes the most intense extratropical cyclone on record. Analysis by the European Centre for Medium-Range Weather Forecasts (ECMWF) using ERA5 reanalysis data estimated the pressure of the cyclone as 900.7 mbar (26.60 inHg) early on 17 October while a paper published in Geophysical Research Letters in July 2023 got a minimum pressure of 899.91 mbar (26.574 inHg) the same day.
- October 13—Present — South eastern Australia floods kills 1 in Rochester, Victoria. Towns across Victoria, Tasmania and New South Wales were evacuated, thousands of properties have been damaged. About 100 properties in inner suburbs of Melbourne along the Maribyrnong river were flooded.
- October 16 — Seattle sets breaks a daily heat record for the day by 16 °F (9 °C), and with a temperature of 88 °F (31 °C), is only one degree shy of tying the monthly record high.
- October 19 — Fog on Interstate 5 in Oregon results in a car crash, killing one person.
- October 26 – November 3 — Tropical Storm Nalgae, known in the Philippines as Severe Tropical Storm Paeng has killed 164 and caused $237 million in damages.
- October 28 - Burlington, Vermont recorded its first freeze, which became the latest first freeze since the National Weather Service recorded temperatures at Burlington International Airport, and latest since 1920 in general, when temperatures were recorded closer to the lake.

=== November ===
In November 2022, the National Centers for Environmental Information documented 18 weather-related fatalities and 396 weather-related injuries in the United States and Territories of the United States.

Hurricane Nicole making landfall in Eastern Florida early on November 10

- November 4–5 - An intense tornado outbreak occurred in the Ark-La-Tex region of the United States. An EF4 tornado struck Caviness, Texas, destroying multiple structures before later moving into Oklahoma and dissipating. Another EF4 tornado struck areas near Clarksville, Texas before also tracking into Oklahoma and inflicting severe EF3 damage in Idabel. Numerous other tornadoes also touched down, including an EF2 tornado that killed one in Pickens, Oklahoma, an EF3 tornado that killed one person northwest of Daingerfield, Texas, and another EF3 tornado that struck Simms and New Boston, Texas. In all, 31 tornadoes were confirmed, with 2 tornadic deaths, 1 non-tornadic death, and at least 24 injuries.
- November 6–7 - A record breaking November heat waves shatters records across the Eastern United States. Burlington, Vermont reached 76 °F (24 °C), the latest so late in the year. Atlanta hit 83 °F (28 °C), which tied for the hottest temperature so late in the year. Harlingen, Texas hit 92 °F (33 °C) which also tied for the hottest so late in the year. Washington DC and Baltimore had lows of 66 °F (19 °C) and 64 °F (18 °C), the warmest so late in the year. Portland, Maine set a record for warmest November low, at 59 °F (15 °C), after a monthly record high of 75 °F (24 °C). On November 7, it was so warm several places set monthly high temperature records, including Islip at 80 °F (27 °C), and New Orleans at 90 °F (32 °C).
- November 7–12 - Hurricane Nicole kills 11 people across the Dominican Republic and the United States.
- November 17–19 - November 2022 Great Lakes winter storm
- November 18 - The earliest trace of snow occurred in Dallas.
- November 18—20 - 2022 Philippine floods - An intertropical convergence zone and a low pressure area caused floods and rain in the Philippines, killing 5.
- November 20 - A flood in Albania killed two people and caused damage to infrastructure and buildings.
- November 22 - A woman was killed due to hypothermia in Zion National Park, while her husband was rescued. Water temperatures in the Virgin River, which they walked through, dropped to 38 °F (3 °C), according to the United States Geological Survey.
- November 24 - Two people were killed due to torrential rainfall in Saudi Arabia. Over 6 hours, 7 inches (18 cm) fell. This became the heaviest rainstorm on record for Jeddah.
- November 29–30 - Another significant tornado outbreak hits the Southern United States. An EF3 tornado in Caldwell Parish, Louisiana causes damage to trees and mobile homes as it touches down along LA 126. An EF2 tornado strikes the Flatwood community north of Montgomery, Alabama, killing two people.

=== December ===
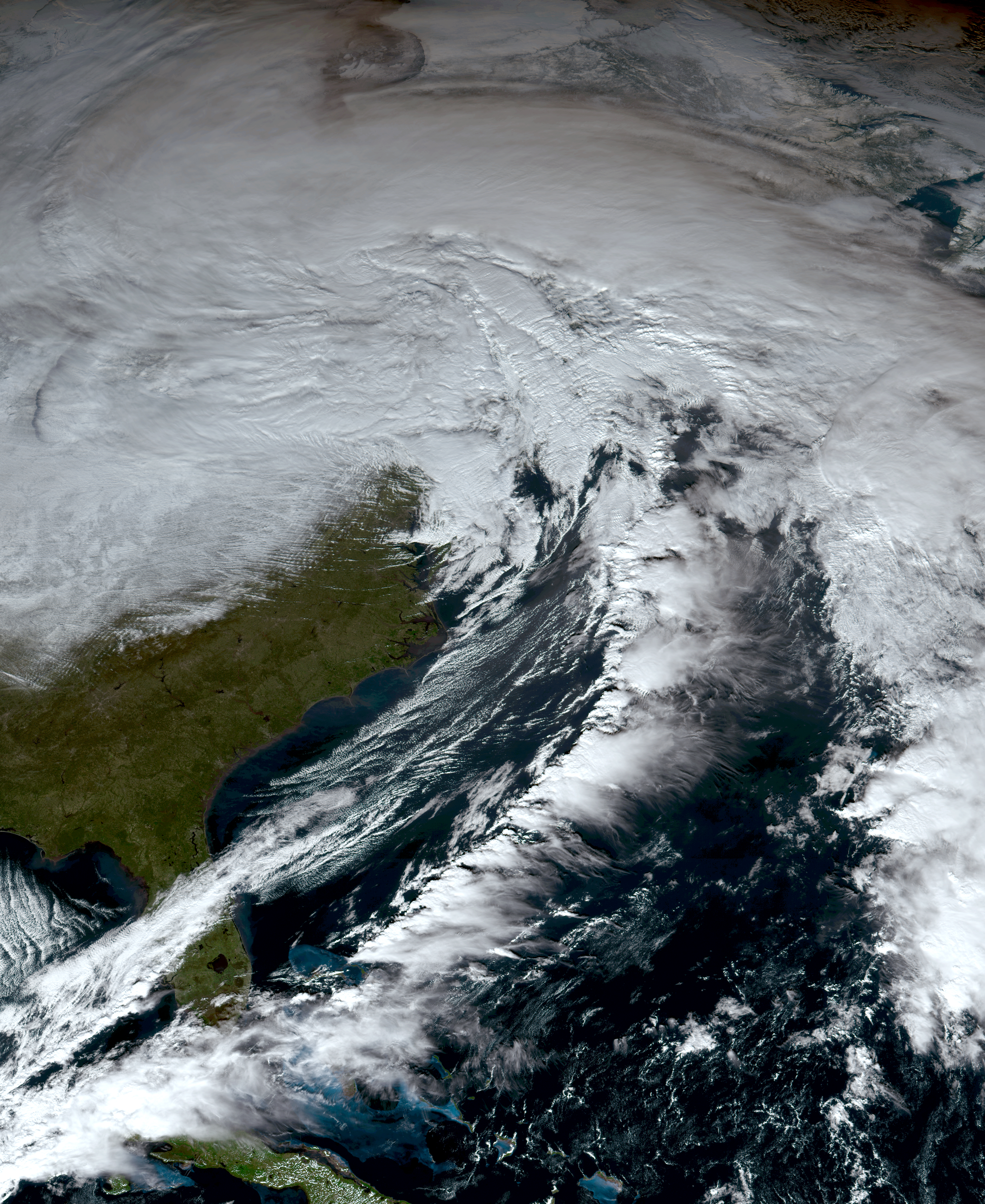
A powerful winter storm at peak intensity over Canada on December 23

- December 5 - Utqiagvik, Alaska set a record high for the month of December, at 40 °F (4 °C).
- December 6–10 - Cyclone Mandous kills nine people across Tamil Nadu and Sri Lanka.
- December 9–12 - Tropical Storm Pakhar, known in the Philippines as Tropical Storm Rosal, kills eight people in the province of Tanay, Rizal.
- December 12–15 - Another devastating tornado outbreak hits the Southern United States. An EF3 tornado strikes the Union Village Apartments in Farmerville, Louisiana. The next day, an EF2 tornado strikes the New Orleans metro and damages some of the areas previously hit by another tornado earlier in the year.
- December 21–26 — A powerful winter storm, unofficially named Winter Storm Elliott by The Weather Channel, kills at least 100 people, cuts power to over 7.7 million customers, disrupts travel, and sets many record-breaking low temperatures across the United States and Canada, with Casper, Wyoming setting an all-time record low at −42 °F (−41 °C).
- December 24–25 — A snowstorm in Japan kills 17 people.
- December 27 - A storm spreads high winds across Oregon, leading to 5 fatalities from 3 crashes.
- December 31 — Record rainfall sweeps throughout California, and the total rainfall accumulation in San Francisco reaches 5.46 in (13.9 cm), which is the second largest single day total on record. The storms also caused 2 people to die throughout the region.

== Space weather ==
- February 4 – A mild solar particle and geomagnetic storm led to the failure and reentry of 40 SpaceX Starlink satellites that had been recently launched and were in low Earth orbit (LEO)

== Events in meteorology ==
- June 28 – A review elucidates the current state of climate change extreme event attribution science, concluding probabilities and costs-severities of links as well as identifying potential ways for its improvement.
- July 4 – Scientists report that heatwaves in western Europe are increasing "three-to-four times faster compared to the rest of the northern midlatitudes over the past 42 years" and that certain atmospheric dynamical changes can explain their increase.
- July 18 – A study shows that climate change-related exceptional marine heatwaves in the Mediterranean Sea during 2015–2019 resulted in widespread mass sealife die-offs in five consecutive years.
- August 12 — The National Centers for Environmental Information publish a report called Assessing the Global Climate in July 2022, where they state an all-time record cold temperature occurred in Australia during the month. On October 7, 2022, Zack Labe, a climate scientist for the NOAA Geophysical Fluid Dynamics Laboratory released a statement and a climate report from Berkeley Earth on the average monthly temperature, tweeting, “There are still no areas of record cold so far in 2022.” Labe's statement also denied the record cold temperatures in Brazil, reported by the National Institute of Meteorology in May 2022, a month before the official start of winter, was also not record cold temperatures.

== See also ==
- Weather of 2021
- List of F4 and EF4 tornadoes (2020–present)

== Notes ==
Global weather by year
Preceded by 2021	Weather of 2022	Succeeded by 2023
