= 2022 Brazil floods and landslides =

Natural disasters in Brazil

- Date: January–May 2022
- Location: Brazil
- Cause: Flood and landslide caused by heavy rain
- Deaths: 365: 28 – January; 231 – February; 106 – May

In 2022, major floods and landslides occurred in Brazil.

== Late January–early February ==
From 28 January to 3 February, a series of floods and landslides killed 28 people in Brazil.

== Mid-February ==
On 15 February, floods and mudslides triggered by heavy rain in Petrópolis, Rio de Janeiro killed at least 231 people.

== May ==
From 27 to 28 May, heavy rains in Recife and Zona da Mata, Pernambuco killed at least 106 people. At least 5,000 people were displaced from their homes.

== See also ==
- Weather of 2022
- 2020 Brazil floods
