= 2022 Murree snowstorm =

Disaster in Punjab, Pakistan

Meteorological history
- Formed: 7 January 2022
- Dissipated: 8 January 2022

Snowstorm
- Max. snowfall: over 4 ft (1.2 m)

Overall effects
- Fatalities: 23 confirmed
- Areas affected: Murree, Murree District, Punjab, Pakistan

On 7 January 2022, a snowstorm occurred in Murree, Murree District, in the Punjab province of Pakistan, dropping more than 4 feet (1.2 m) of snow, killing 23 domestic tourists who had visited to see the snowfall. Many died as temperatures fell to around minus 8 degrees Celsius (17.6 F).

== Background ==
A day before the incident, hundreds of thousands of people from other parts of Pakistan had driven to the high-altitude town of Murree in Murree District, Punjab, Pakistan, to see the snowfall. Several vehicles became stuck on the roads due to the snowfall and thousands of tourists spent the night on the roads. Snowfall began on Tuesday night and continued intermittently throughout the week, attracting many tourists. Murree is a popular destination for Pakistani tourists whenever it sees snow.

The Met Office had issued an alert on 5 January warning that heavy snowfall could potentially cause road closures in the area from 6–9 January. Soon after that, the Murree tehsil administration issued a travel advisory, urging tourists to check weather and traffic updates before coming. Since Murree is just a tehsil within the broader Rawalpindi district, the district administration itself did not hold a meeting to discuss the issue, although Deputy Commissioner Mohammad Ali said on social media that an increased number of traffic wardens were deployed. The National Disaster Management Authority also did not call for a meeting with district officials to prepare for the increased traffic.

Tourists complained that hotels had driven up prices to capitalise on the massive influx of tourists, prompting many people to sleep in their cars. Rooms that normally cost Rs.6,000-10,000 per night were being rented for Rs.70,000 per night, while food prices were also marked up high. Prices for an average of Rs.40 for a cup of tea skyrocketed to Rs. 700. This led to the hashtag #BoycottMurree trending on Twitter on Sunday.

== Storm ==
On Friday, 7 January, a blizzard dumped four feet of snow on Murree. During the intervening night of 7 and 8 January, over 157,000 vehicles entered Murree as snowfall began.

Cars were packed bumper-to-bumper on the roads surrounding Murree. All routes into and out of Murree were effectively blocked, leaving the tourists stranded. When it began to snow heavily, a lot of people left their cars on the roads to seek shelter in hotels, further contributing to the congestion. Negligence by local authorities may have also contributed to the congestion: in some areas, over 13,000 cars were allowed onto roads that were only designed to accommodate 4,000 at a time.

In some places, the heavy snowfall and strong winds caused trees to fall, blocking roads and in at least one case falling onto multiple vehicles.

At least 22 tourists died. The victims suffered from hypothermia while some may have died of carbon monoxide inhalation because their exhaust pipes were blocked by snow, which resulted in leakage of carbon monoxide into the cars, causing the deaths.

The victims included Islamabad police officer Naveed Iqbal, his sister, three nephews, and three of his own children; a couple from Rawalpindi with two sons and two daughters; and four friends from Mardan. Funerals were held for the victims on Sunday in their respective hometowns.

On Saturday, the death toll reached 23; a four-year-old girl died at Jhika Gali, apparently of hypothermia and pneumonia.

The snowstorm also caused problems for local residents: water pipes were damaged due to freezing, making drinking water inaccessible in most places. Hotels also started to run out of food and cell phone service was "patchy". Gas cylinders also started to run out.

== Rescue operations ==
On Friday night, Chief Traffic Officer Taimoor Khan announced that all traffic into Murree was now banned.

On Saturday, 8 January, the government deployed military forces to assist in rescue efforts.

Work was done to remove the vehicles stuck in the snow. Five infantry platoons of the Pakistan Army, Frontier Corps, and Rangers were also called for rescue operations.

Meanwhile, the Khyber Pakhtunkhwa Integrated Tourism Development Project (KITE) announced on Saturday that Galiyat would be completely closed to tourists for the next two days.

Over Saturday night over 700 vehicles were pulled out from the snow and stranded tourists were taken to safety at one of five military-run relief camps, where they were given medication and warm food. By 10:30 pm on Sunday, military authorities reported that all stranded motorists had been gotten to safety, while army engineers and troops continued to work on clearing snow off from roads in the area. Engineers had already cleared the Murree Expressway.

Punjab Chief Minister Usman Buzdar chaired a meeting at Gharial on Sunday, which formed a committee to investigate which government departments had been responsible for the disaster. Buzdar promised "impartial action" toward the responsible parties and announced that there would be 17.6 million Rs. in compensation paid to the families of the deceased. He also directed officials to take action against the hotels that had engaged in price gouging during the snowstorm. The meeting also announced that Murree would be made into a separate district within Punjab, with two new police stations, and that two new parking plazas would be installed in the busiest areas of Murree.

The Pakistan Telecommunication Authority announced that people in the area with no mobile balance would be given extended free calls; they also instructed operators to keep backup power supply to make sure the telecommunication needs of people stranded could be met.

Roads remained closed on Monday. People in Murree still lacked electricity and drinking water; the Pakistan Water and Power Development Authority (WAPDA) sent people to restore the electricity supply but was unsuccessful due to lingering extreme weather.

The district administration has issued instructions that locals should not leave their homes at night and ambulance services, security vehicles and firefighters have been asked to remain alert.

== Reactions and criticism ==
- Prime Minister Imran Khan ordered an inquiry into the Murree tragedy and said that a large number of people had reached Murree without determining the weather. He tweeted: “Shocked & upset at tragic deaths of tourists on road to Murree. Unprecedented snowfall & rush of ppl proceeding without checking weather conditions caught district admin unprepared. Have ordered inquiry & putting in place strong regulation to ensure prevention of such tragedies.” Many people criticised the tweet as insensitive, with journalist Absa Komal responding “Insensitive and shocking response, it is your administration’s failure, accept it at least! They could have easily taken preventive measures knowing that a huge number of people were heading towards Murree.”
- Federal Interior Minister Sheikh Rasheed Ahmad reached Murree to oversee the rescue operation. He has also said that if people had been prevented from coming to Murree from Khyber Pakhtunkhwa, there would not have been any tragedy but the situation would have been brought under control by morning.
- Federal Minister for Information Fawad Chaudhry has said that a large number of people died in a short period of time which caused problems. By promoting tourism we do not mean that all people come at the same time.
- Opposition leader Shehbaz Sharif tweeted: “What a massive tragedy Murree is turning out to be! Heartbroken to learn about the loss of so many precious lives.” He said, "Where was the government all the while? What arrangements did it make to deal with such an influx? Incompetence is fast turning into criminality. Prior arrangements & round the clock supervision were the normal SOPs in the past."
- JUI-F leader and former Opposition leader Maulana Fazal-ur-Rehman tweeted, The death of 19 tourists in Murree is a tragic tragedy. First, tourists were allowed to enter without warning and then instead of rescuing the people trapped in the snow and delivering food and medicine, they were left helpless. Is it the government or the killer of the people? The people of Murree are requested to help their Pakistani brothers and sisters".
- Pakistan People's Party chairman Bilawal Bhutto Zardari released a statement saying, “It would have been better if the tourists were informed about the weather in Murree in advance."
- PML-N vice president Maryam Nawaz tweeted, “The job of governments is not only to count tourists but also to make prior arrangements and security measures for them” and “These deaths are not because of the snowfall, but due to government negligence.”
- PML-N leader and former prime minister Shahid Khaqan Abbasi directly blamed Imran Khan and Usman Buzdar for the incident, saying they did not care about the people and "[were] sitting only to prolong their rule".
- On Monday, opposition leader Shehbaz Sharif called for a judicial committee to be formed to investigate the incident, supported by Bilawal Bhutto Zardari and other opposition parties.

== See also ==
- Weather of 2022
- List of natural disasters in Pakistan
