= 2022 Antananarivo floods =

Floods in Madagascar in 2022

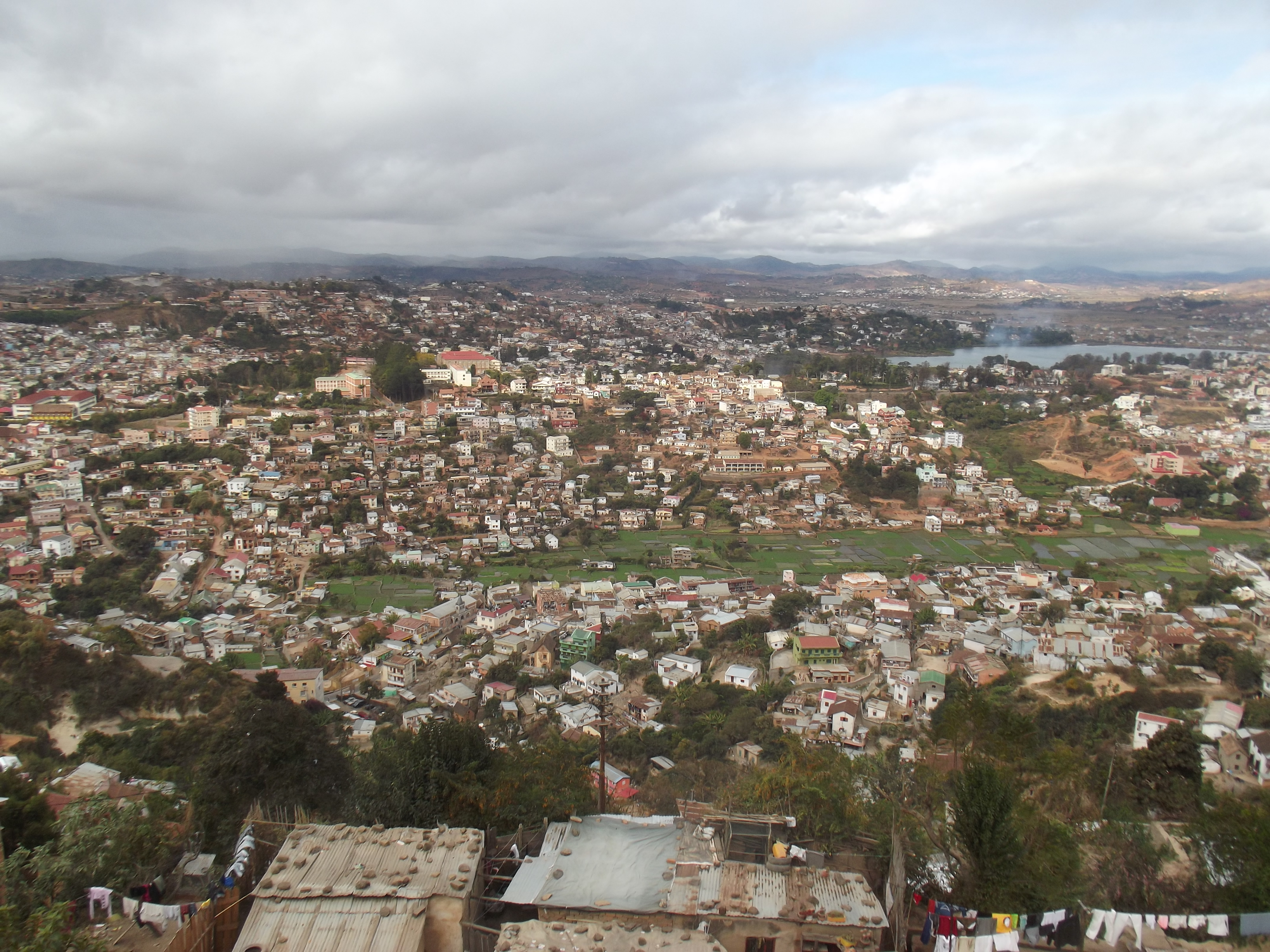
- Antananarivo
- Date: 18 January 2022 – 23 January 2022
- Location: Madagascar
- Cause: Heavy rainfall Moderate Tropical Storm Ana.
- Deaths: 34
- Property damage: 6,800 buildings water damaged

On 18 January 2022, a series of floods occurred in northern Madagascar, especially around the Antananarivo area, where 11 people were killed. The floods were caused by heavy rainfall, with rainfall totals of up to 226 mm falling during the night of 17–18 January.

== Impact ==
=== Madagascar ===
In total, 34 deaths were reported, 11 on January 18, and an additional 23 from Tropical Storm Ana on January 23. The country's National Office for Risk and Disaster Management reported that 6,800 houses had been flooded, and more than 35,000 people were temporarily displaced. Rainfall totals reached up to 226 mm in parts of Madagascar.

== See also ==
- Weather of 2022
- 2022 Eastern Cape floods
