= Cyclones Mandous and ARB 03 =

North Indian Ocean cyclones in 2022

Severe Cyclonic Storm Mandous Deep Depression ARB 03
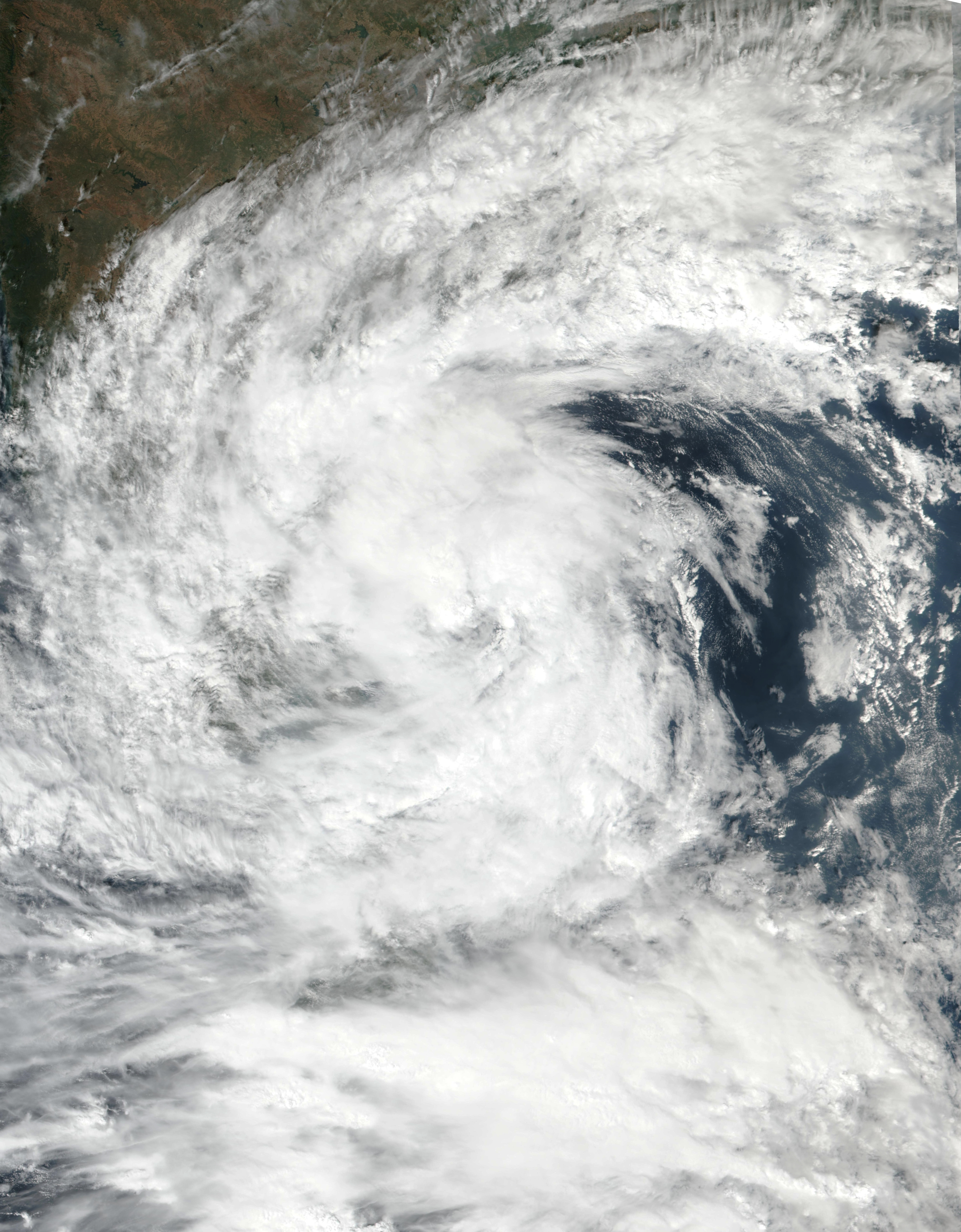
- Cyclone Mandous at peak intensity prior to landfall on December 09

Meteorological history
- as Severe Cyclonic Storm Mandous
- Formed: 6 December 2022
- Dissipated: 10 December 2022

Severe cyclonic storm
- 3-minute sustained (IMD)
- Highest winds: 95 km/h (60 mph)
- Lowest pressure: 990 hPa (mbar); 29.23 inHg

Tropical storm
- 1-minute sustained (SSHWS/JTWC)
- Highest winds: 100 km/h (65 mph)
- Lowest pressure: 990 hPa (mbar); 29.23 inHg

Meteorological history
- as Deep Depression ARB 03
- Formed: 14 December 2022
- Dissipated: 17 December 2022

Deep depression
- 3-minute sustained (IMD)
- Highest winds: 55 km/h (35 mph)
- Lowest pressure: 1000 hPa (mbar); 29.53 inHg

Tropical storm
- 1-minute sustained (SSHWS/JTWC)
- Highest winds: 95 km/h (60 mph)
- Lowest pressure: 994 hPa (mbar); 29.35 inHg

Overall effects
- Fatalities: 9
- Damage: $27.4 million (2022 USD)
- Areas affected: Tamil Nadu, Andhra Pradesh, Sri Lanka
- Part of the 2022 North Indian Ocean cyclone season

Severe Cyclonic Storm Mandous (Note: The name Mandous (Arabic: مندوس, [manduːs]) was contributed by the United Arab Emirates and refers to wooden chests used to hold valuables in Arabic.) was the third cyclonic storm, as well as the third most intense tropical cyclone of the 2022 North Indian Ocean cyclone season. The remnants of the system later regenerated into Deep Depression ARB 03 in the Arabian Sea. The system struck the Andaman and Nicobar Islands, as well as South India.

== Meteorological history ==
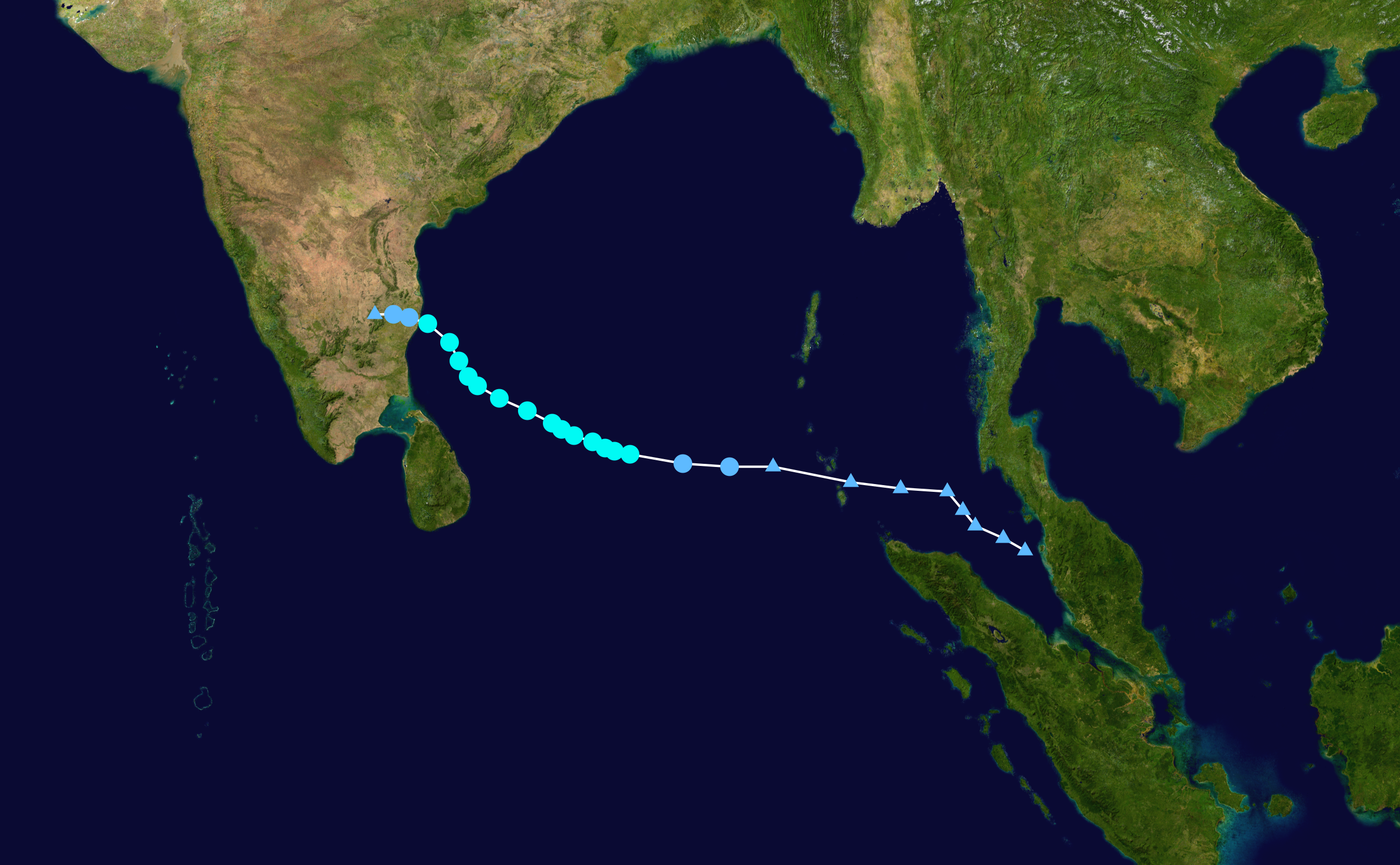
Map plotting the storm's track and intensity, according to the Saffir–Simpson scale Map key Saffir–Simpson scale Tropical depression (≤38 mph, ≤62 km/h) Tropical storm (39–73 mph, 63–118 km/h) Category 1 (74–95 mph, 119–153 km/h) Category 2 (96–110 mph, 154–177 km/h) Category 3 (111–129 mph, 178–208 km/h) Category 4 (130–156 mph, 209–251 km/h) Category 5 (≥157 mph, ≥252 km/h) Unknown Storm type Tropical cyclone Subtropical cyclone Extratropical cyclone, remnant low, tropical disturbance, or monsoon depression

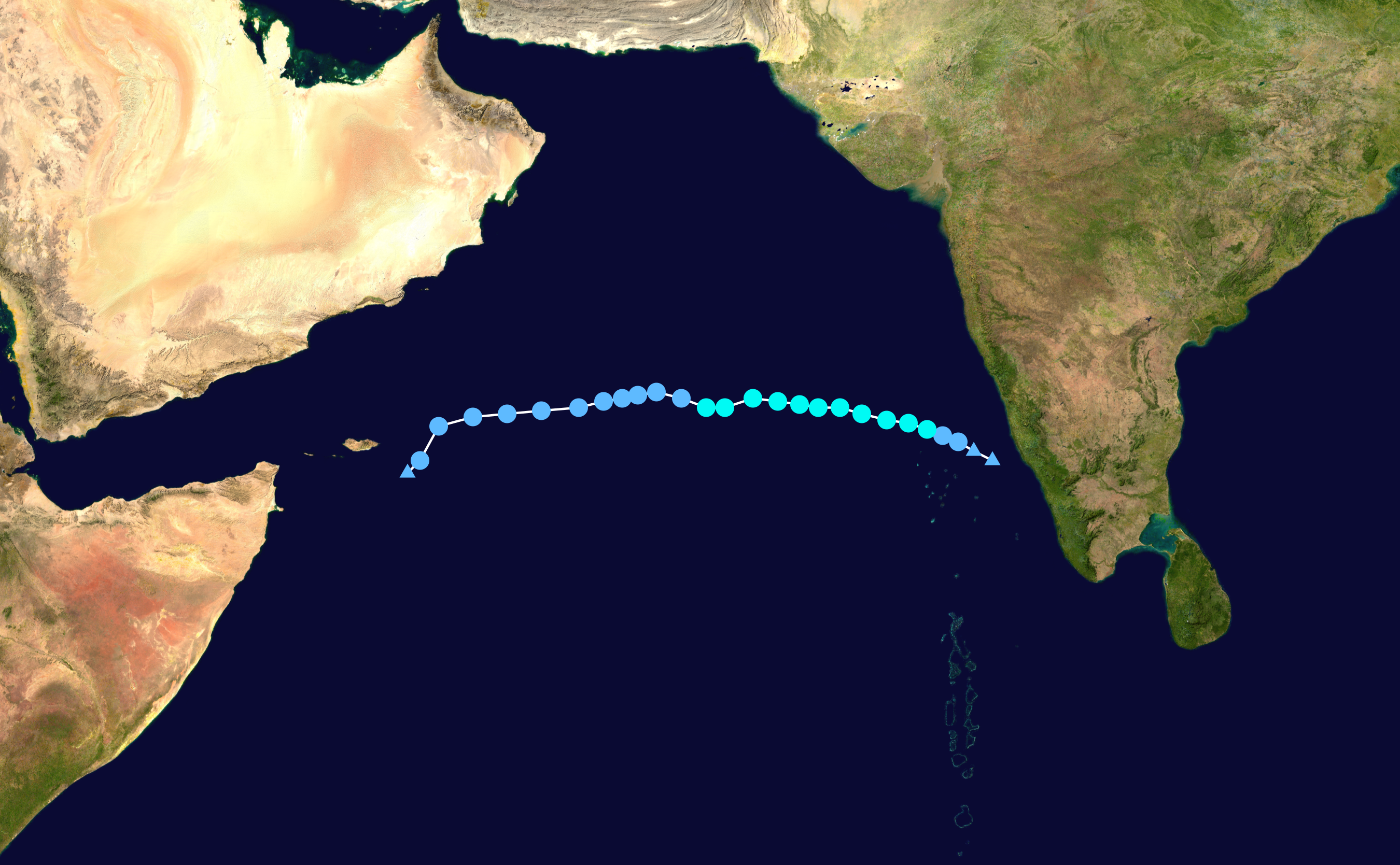
Map plotting the storm's track and intensity, according to the Saffir–Simpson scale Map key Saffir–Simpson scale Tropical depression (≤38 mph, ≤62 km/h) Tropical storm (39–73 mph, 63–118 km/h) Category 1 (74–95 mph, 119–153 km/h) Category 2 (96–110 mph, 154–177 km/h) Category 3 (111–129 mph, 178–208 km/h) Category 4 (130–156 mph, 209–251 km/h) Category 5 (≥157 mph, ≥252 km/h) Unknown Storm type Tropical cyclone Subtropical cyclone Extratropical cyclone, remnant low, tropical disturbance, or monsoon depression

The Indian Meteorological Department issued a bulletin stating that a tropical depression had formed in the Bay of Bengal and was designated BOB 09. The JTWC, released a TCFA on the system, stating that it could intensify further, because of very warm waters and low to moderate wind shear, designating it Invest 96B. A day later, both the JTWC and IMD classified this low pressure as a "cyclonic storm" and it was named Mandous. Mandous continued tracking westward, and later, attaining wind speeds of 65 mph (105 km/h; 56 kn), strengthened into a Severe Cyclonic Storm. As it continued tracking westward, land interaction caused in to fall to Cyclonic Storm intensity. It later made landfall around Chennai, India as a Deep Depression. It fell to Depression intensity, and later degenerated into a remnant low.

=== Regeneration ===
On December 14, the remnants of Cyclone Mandous regenerated into a depression in the Arabian Sea, and it was called ARB 03. The Joint Typhoon Warning Center dubbed it as Invest 97A. Although forecasted to quickly degenerate into a remnant low, ARB 03 intensified into a Deep Depression, according to the Indian Meteorological Department, and the JTWC dubbed it as Cyclone 07A. After reaching peak intensity, the Low-Level Circulation detached from the associated convection, and wind shear increased, starting a weakening trend. It weakened into a low pressure area at 12:00 UTC on December 17.

== Preparations ==
In Puducherry and Karaikal, colleges and schools were closed in anticipation of the storm. Authorities also deployed National Disaster Response Force (NDRF) personnel and established emergency control rooms in preparation for possible flooding and storm impacts. Oil rigs and offshore installations were asked to ensure the safety of personnel. Tamil Nadu chief secretary V. Irai Anbu instructed officials to provide advance notice before releasing surplus water rom reservoirs and to move residents of vulnerable areas to shelters. The state government also advised the public to avoid unnecessary travel.

== Impact ==
Cyclone Mandous had a notable impact on several regions, particularly in southern India and Sri Lanka. In Chennai, approximately 200 trees were uprooted due to strong winds and heavy rainfall, causing disruptions to transportation and daily activities. Power outages were reported in some areas, and local authorities worked to clear the debris and restore services.

In Tirupati district, Andhra Pradesh, the cyclone resulted in loss amounting to Rs 226 crore (US$27.4 million). The storm caused damage to infrastructure, crops, and property, affecting the local economy.

In Tamil Nadu, four fatalities were reported due to heavy rains and flooding. Several districts experienced widespread rainfall, leading to flooding and property damage. Emergency services were deployed to provide relief and assistance.

Off the coast of Sri Lanka, five fishermen went missing during the cyclone, prompting search and rescue operations. The storm also caused disruptions to fishing activities and damage to boats along the coastal areas.

== See also ==
- Weather of 2022
- Tropical cyclones in 2022
- Cyclone Nivar (2020)
- Cyclone Vardah (2016)
