= 2022 Pakistan landslides =

Landslides in Pakistan

- Date: 20-23 January 2022
- Location: Khyber Pakhtunkhwa, Pakistan
- Deaths: 8
- Property damage: Unknown

The 2022 Pakistan landslides began on 20 January and lasted until 23 January as heavy rains caused multiple landslides and buildings to collapse in the Khyber Pakhtunkhwa province of Pakistan. In total, eight people were killed by the storm system.

== See also ==
- Weather of 2022
