= 2022 North American heat waves =

Heat wave affecting North America

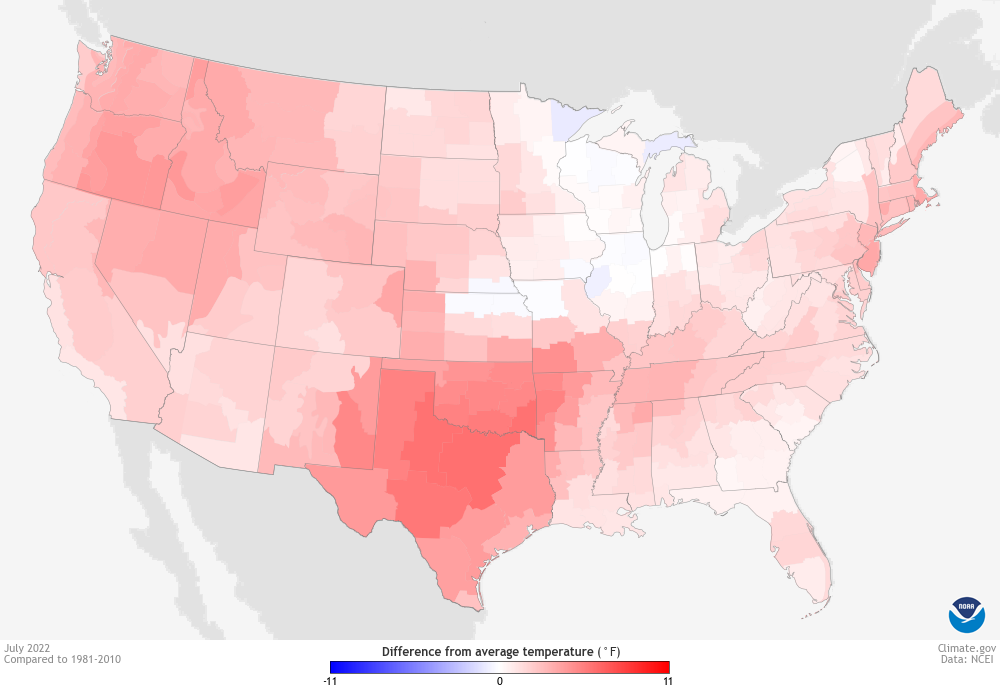
- A map provided from NOAA of the temperature anomalies across the Contiguous United States in July 2022

Meteorological history
- Duration: May 9, 2022 - September 21, 2022
- Heat event
- Max temp: 127 °F (53 °C), recorded at Death Valley on September 1

Overall effects
- Fatalities: 117
- Damage: $9.3 billion (2022 USD)

From late spring to late summer heat waves in 2022 smashed many records in North America between May and September of that year. Dozens of temperature records were surpassed in the United States.

== May ==
The first round of intense heat came on May 13, when Caribou, Maine hit 90 °F (32 °C), the second earliest date in the calendar year a temperature of that magnitude was reached. The next day, three people who lived inside of a senior building died in Chicago, Illinois, as a result of the heat, due to the air conditioning malfunctioning. Later that month, in Memphis, Tennessee, when temperatures reached 91 °F (33 °C), an infant died after being left unattended inside of a motor vehicle.

On May 21, 2022, heat became prevalent in the Mid-Atlantic, resulting in a near record hot Preakness Stakes horse race, with Baltimore and Philadelphia having temperatures of 95 °F (35 °C), Washington DC at 92 °F (33 °C), and New York City at 90 °F (32 °C). This heat persisted into May 22, when Dulles International Airport hit 91 °F (33 °C), breaking the daily high record, and Westfield, Massachusetts hit 93 °F (34 °C). After a respite, intense heat returned on May 31, as much of the New York Metropolitan Area set record highs that day. Toronto also recorded a record high of 32.2 °C (90.0 °F) that day. Further south, schools released kids early that day due to the heat, with highs forecast in the upper 90s Fahrenheit. However, by June 1, a backdoor cold front reduced temperatures dramatically. On May 31, Boston dropped from 82 °F (28 °C) to 63 °F (17 °C) in ten minutes.

== June ==
A historic heat wave affected the Midwestern United States and Southwestern United States in the second week of June 2022. In Phoenix, a daily record was tied, as the mercury soared up to 114 °F (45.6 °C). In North Platte, Nebraska, a record temperature of 108 °F (42 °C) was recorded. In Death Valley, a man died when trying to refuel gas as temperatures climbed to 123 °F (51 °C). In Rocky Mountain National Park, the excess heat resulted in rapid snowmelt, and the flooding forced a trail in the park to close. A trail was also shut down at Joshua Tree National Park, where temperatures were predicted to reach as high as 117 °F (47 °C). Temperatures in Memphis soared to 98 °F (37 °C), with a heat index of 110 °F (43 °C). The heat dome resulted in over 125 million people under excessive heat warnings. In Odessa, Texas, thousands of residents were left without water, even as the temperature got to 105 °F (41 °C). In San Antonio, every day in June 2022 was at least as hot as 97 °F (36 °C), except for June 28. On June 13, St. Louis hit 100 °F (37.8 °C), breaking the daily record. In addition, from June 13–16, the morning low never went below 81 °F (27.2 °C), breaking the warmest morning low record for the next 4 days. In Chicago, Midway Airport recorded three days with high temperatures of at least 100 °F (38 °C) between June 14 and 21. On June 17, the heat dome moved over the Mid-Atlantic briefly, causing a record high of 99 °F (37 °C) in Washington DC, and tying the record high of 96 °F (36 °C) in Baltimore.

On June 18 saw Mobile, Alabama have a record high of 100 °F (38 °C). On June 20, Minneapolis set a daily record high of 101 °F (38 °C), with a heat index of 105 °F (41 °C). This was the first time Minneapolis saw triple digits in four years. Grand Forks, North Dakota saw a daily high record of 100 °F (38 °C) in June 19, and Houston and Galveston saw record highs of 101 °F (38 °C) and 97 °F (36 °C) respectively on June 20.

Heat in Alaska triggered 31 wildfires.

== July ==
An intense, fatal heat wave swept through the United States in July. More than 100 million people were put on heat alerts, and over 85% of the country had temperatures at or above 90 °F (32 °C). A man died in Dallas County, Texas, and a heat emergency was triggered in Washington DC due to temperatures over 95 °F (35 °C), on the weekend of July 23–24. This extreme heat also intensified drought conditions. Arkansas and Missouri went from 1% and 2% of their states from seeing severe drought or worse, to a quarter and a third. On July 17, Winnipeg saw their highest ever dew point, at 27.4 °C (81.3 °F).

Temperatures in Abilene, Texas on July 20 hit 110 °F (43 °C), breaking a daily record. Austin, Texas also saw a daily high record of 104 °F (40 °C). Daily record high low temperature records were set, including Needles, California (95 °F (35 °C)), Galveston (86 °F (30 °C)), Wichita Falls (84 °F (29 °C)), Houston (81 °F (27 °C)) and Laredo (81 °F (27 °C)), on July 20. The heat wave was responsible for 18 other deaths, including 12 in Maricopa County, Arizona and one at Badlands National Park. Witchita Falls hit 115 °F (46 °C) on July 20, a record for July, while on that day Oklahoma also reached that mark. Oklahoma City set a monthly record high of 110 °F (43 °C). Further east, every day from July 20 to 24 in Newark, New Jersey got at or over 100 °F (38 °C), the longest streak on record. Boston also set a record high on July 24, at 100 °F (38 °C). When the heat wave broke on July 25, multiple flash flood warnings were issued with the cold front. While most parts of New Jersey exceeded 90 °F (32 °C) for the 8th day, New York City was kept to 86 °F (30 °C), thus keeping the heat wave to 6 days there.

Later on in the month, another heat wave in Portland, Oregon causes 14 additional deaths. Portland saw 7 consecutive days at or above 95 °F (35 °C), while Seattle saw six days at or above 90 °F (32 °C), both breaking records for duration, by July 31.

== August ==
Intense heat continued into August. In early August, a heat wave forced 80 million Americans under heat alerts. Albany, New York set a new daily record high of 99 °F (37 °C) on August 4. On August 7, Portland set a high temperature record of 96 °F (36 °C). Boston set a new daily record high on August 8, at 98 °F (37 °C). On August 9, Philadelphia got an excessive heat warning due to heat indexes over 105 °F (41 °C) for two consecutive hours. The heat dome resulted in a ten day long heat wave in Philadelphia, while Boston saw temperatures above 95 °F (35 °C) for six days in a row. Due to this, the New York Metropolitan Area had a top 5 hottest August, and Islip, New York and Newark, New Jersey had their warmest on record, and so did Philadelphia. Further west, Missoula, Montana saw their hottest August on record, while Portland, Oregon recorded their warmest ever month. August, like July, was the warmest for daily minimums in the United States. Oregon, Washington, Idaho, New Jersey, Connecticut, Rhode Island, Massachusetts and New Hampshire had their warmest August on record. In addition, Newark set a record for the most days above 90 °F (32 °C) in August.

== September ==
On September 1, Death Valley hit 127 °F (53 °C), a global record for September. That day, parts of Interstate 15 near Centerville, Utah buckled. On September 4, a monthly record was set in Casper, Wyoming at 100 °F (38 °C). Sacramento hit a record high on September 5, of 116 °F (47 °C). San Francisco also had a daily record that day of 97 °F (36 °C). A monthly record high of Salt Lake City was set as well that day, at 103 °F (39 °C). California's power grid nearly broke. There were two deaths – one each in Arizona and Idaho. Later on in the month, Nashville set their latest day at or above 100 °F (38 °C) on September 21. Nevada and Utah saw their hottest September on record, and the 3rd quarter of 2022 for the United States as a whole was the hottest on record. September 2022 became the hottest on record for the continent of North America at large.

== See also ==
- Weather of 2022
- 2020–22 North American drought
