= Palocabildo =

Coordinates: 5.13333°N 75.0333°W

- Municipality and town
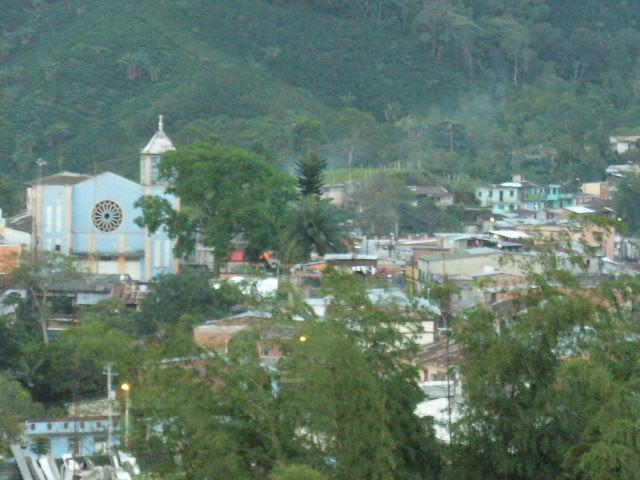

- Flag Coat of arms

- Location of the municipality and town of Palocabildo in the Tolima Department of Colombia.
- Country: Colombia
- Department: Tolima Department

Government
  - mayor: Hener Eduardo Salinas Martinez

Area
  - Total: 65 km^{2} (25 sq mi)
- Elevation: 1,450 m (4,760 ft)

Population (2017)
  - Total: 9,120
- Time zone: UTC-5 (Colombia Standard Time)

Palocabildo is a town and municipality in the Tolima department of Colombia.
