= 2022 Eastern Cape floods =

2022 deadly floods in Eastern Cape province, South Africa

2022 Eastern Cape Floods
- Eastern Cape Province in South Africa
- Date: 8 – 13 January 2022
- Location: Eastern Cape, South Africa
- Cause: Heavy rains
- Deaths: 20 confirmed

Buffalo City Municipality, Eastern Cape Province

In early January 2022, the Eastern Cape province in South Africa experienced heavy rain and flooding following a thunderstorm that swept away homes, personal belongings and loved ones. These flash floods have left hundreds homeless, especially in township of Mdantsane which is situated on a floodplain making it more vulnerable to these types of natural disasters. Scientists believe that climate change is responsible for the droughts and floods along the eastern coastline. There were 20 casualties from this disaster, including a police rescue diver who, after saving three lives, got caught on a rope and drowned.

== Background and details of the disaster ==
The Eastern Cape province, located on the east coast of South Africa records on average 40 mm (1,600 thou) of rain in the month of January, typical of the rainy season. However, in the Buffalo City Municipality, which is home to the city of East London and surrounding towns, notably the township of Mdantsane, situated further inland on a floodplain, recorded 58mm of rain all within 24 hours between 8–9 January 2022.

Other municipalities impacted were the OR Tambo District Municipality, the Amathole District Municipality and the Alfred Duma Local Municipality.

=== Brief history ===
Flash floods are not a new phenomena in the Eastern cape, however they have become more frequent in recent years. Severe floods were recorded in February 2020, just before the start of the COVID-19 pandemic lockdown. Other notable floods occurred in December 2021, typically a festive period for South Africans, which brought numerous challenges, worsened by the global pandemic and more frequent flooding disasters.

Before the January 2022 floods, Buffalo City Municipality experienced a period of long-term drought that had hit the Eastern Cape province which lead to the implementation of strict water-use regulations. These torrential rains were both a blessing and curse, as they brought in a much needed water supply, however the strong current ravaged through the township, leaving nothing but disaster behind.

=== Details ===
The storm arrived without warning. The response from the cities and weather services was not quick enough to warn the citizens, primarily due to the lack of preventative measures in place ahead of these disastrous floods. Carte Blanche covered the story, which aired on 16 January 2022 on M-net. Extensive coverage depicted the devastation of the floods on the people of Mdantsane. Images of pollution and rubbish around the township were displayed, as well as images of destroyed homes, crops, roads, bridges and other infrastructure.

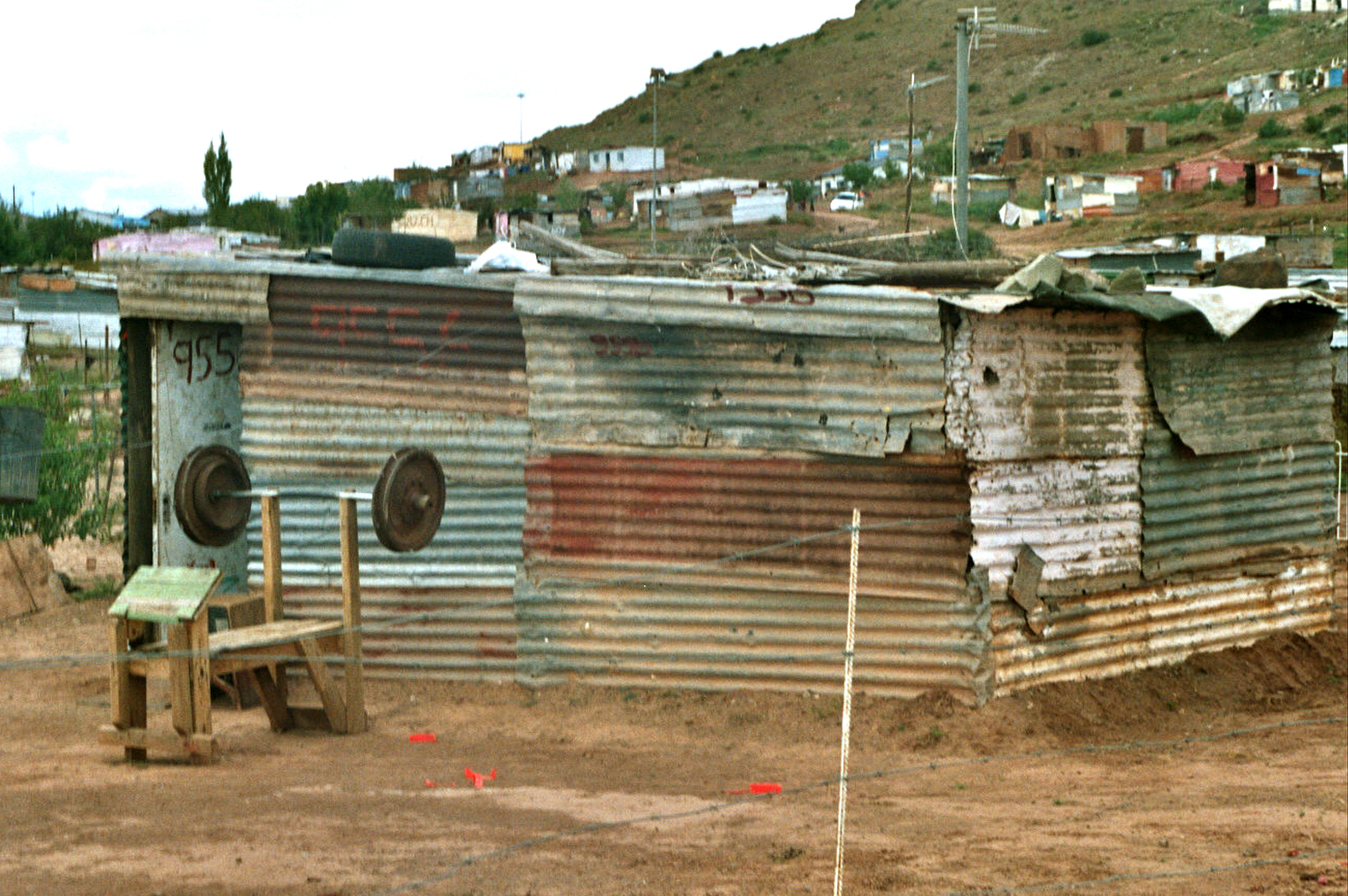
Typical shack in Aliwal North, Eastern Cape. A township north of Mdantsane.

The surrounding informal settlements didn't stand a chance against the natural disasters due to the poor infrastructure of these homes. These homes, also known as shacks, which are built from iron, tin and any materials found, do not have the structural support to protect its inhabitants. Amid this flooding disaster, an already struggling population was forced into survival mode as they tried to rebuild their lives and communities. Gift of the givers, a known charitable organisation in South Africa was on the scene helping to distribute food parcels, blankets and other basic necessities, however the municipality and government were called upon to help rebuild the destroyed towns and its surrounding areas, as well as to provide support for the citizens and survivors of this disaster.

== Local response ==
According to Met Office scientist Nikos Christidi, extreme weather events are "growing so prevalent that they will no longer be extreme events by the end of the century". He also highlighted that the threats from climate change are rising quickly. Global ecosystems, public health, transportation, infrastructure, education, and other areas are all severely impacted by climate disasters. More than 11,000 natural disasters have been documented worldwide in the last 50 years, resulting in 2 million fatalities and $3.64 trillion in material damage, according to the World Meteorological Organization. "Climate disasters are becoming more frequent, raising the possibility of decreased food production, poverty, hunger, and heightened danger of unrest and conflict in some countries." said Petrie Taalas, secretary general of the World Meteorological Organization.

In response to the disaster, South Africa's environment departments developed a response plan to address the weather disasters brought on by climate change and to assist the victims in recovering more quickly. The floods left a number of people dead, hundreds of people homeless, and many homes damaged. Additionally, the city administration established contact with officials at the Nahoon Dam to update the flood warning system and take action, and the local government collaborated with them on forecasts, alerts, and warnings.

On the humanitarian front, companies supported flood victims by giving them goods and warmth, while non-profit organizations were highly productive in delivering resources like food, blankets, and mattresses. The government made an official request for aide from different organizations and other people. A social relief programme team was swiftly established by the government as part of the relief effort. This team collaborated with various government departments and expressed heartfelt gratitude to the organizations that have already donated. These efforts hoped to inspire additional organizations to do the same.

== Morbidity and Mortality ==
=== Mortality ===
Initial reports have indicated that there were only 14 casualties as a result of these flash floods. However, an updated death toll on January 15 confirmed an increase in the number of casualties to 20 individuals. Eight casualties were found in Buffalo City Municipality, another eight in OR Tambo District Municipality, three in Amathole District Municipality and one in Alfred Duma Local Municipality. The Buffalo City Municipality was the only one of the four areas in Eastern Cape province who have disclosed more detailed information about their casualties. Notably, two children drowned in the Buffalo River and a police officer drowned in Horseshoe Valley Nahoon River. He was a member of the search and rescue team following this disaster.

=== Morbidity ===
While these January flash floods have yielded a fairly low mortality compared to other flooding disasters in South Africa, the associated morbidity with extensive flooding is well defined. The short-term morbidity is caused by drowning injuries, illnesses and internal displacement. One person in Buffalo City Municipality was treated at the hospital for drowning related injuries and 34 others were displaced due to habitat destruction. The displaced individuals were temporarily given shelter in the NU.7 Community of the town Mdantsane.

Other flood-related morbidities include loss of health infrastructure, increased incidence of poor mental health and decreased access to food supplies among survivors. The OR Tambo District Municipality had to temporarily close the Mqanduli Community Health Centre due to damage from the flooding. The Buffalo City Municipality reported that one person was brought into the hospital and treated for post-traumatic stress disorder related to the floods. Detailed reports describing the full impact of these floods on food security have not been published; however, Vodacom, a South African mobile operator company, has distributed food parcels which provided essential relief to the 34 survivors of the flood in Buffalo City Municipality. A Mdantsane resident spoke of the donation, “We are very grateful... with the essentials [Vodacom] has provided for us.”

== Ecological and physical impact ==
=== Ecological ===
There are no detailed data and no definitive environmental reports related to this flooding. But according to some articles, flooding can cause the following consequences:

- Wildlife habitat may be destroyed by flooding
- Contaminated floods contaminate rivers and habitats
- Silt and sediment can damage farm crops
- When the river reaches full bank capacity, the banks and natural dikes can be eliminated
- Rivers can widen and downstream sedimentation can increase
- High-speed water can uproot trees
- Plants that survived initial flood may die from being submerged

=== Physical ===
Flooding hit infrastructure hardest, especially roads and water treatment plant. According to a report released by the Buffalo City Metropolitan Municipality on January 12, after an assessment by the disaster center and the fire brigade, it was found that the road was blocked by debris and a large amount of rainwater had accumulated. The most affected roads were the Qumza Highway in Mdantsane, Woolwash Road near the Scenery Park bridge and the Douglas Smith Highway in Duncan Village.Some bridges, in particular the Zone 15 road bridge, were damaged and required assessments.

The flooding also had a negative impact on local water infrastructure, with raw water from Bridle Drift Dam to the Umzonyana water treatment plant negatively affected by flash floods, resulting in limited water use for residents. As of February 1, the water quality had improved and returned within safe drinking standards. But the amount of water that is safe to drink remains an issue that needs to be further addressed. Finally, floods are considered by scholars to have the worst impact on the poor and pose a serious threat to the insurance industry while causing huge economic losses.

== Short and long-term consequences ==
=== Short-term ===
Urban floods mostly afflict the informal settlements of African cities, which are characterised by subpar housing and infrastructure. The flash floods in parts of the Eastern Cape displaced hundreds of people. Infrastructure was severely damaged, including 49 health facilities and 57 schools. Bridges were destroyed, access to pipelines was blocked, rivers washed away their banks and some main roads were flooded, making access to stranded communities even more difficult. Environmental health services and infrastructure were damaged or disrupted, and the risk of waterborne and food-borne infections increased. Overcrowding and population displacement are ideal environments for outbreaks of respiratory and gastrointestinal diseases. Residents who suffer from chronic illnesses may not have received the care they needed or taken their medication on time. As the floodwaters receded, disease-carrying insects proliferated. Scientists have predicted the imminent emergence of highly contagious animal diseases.

=== Long-term ===
With global climate change and increased urbanisation, heavy rainfall events are expected to occur more frequently and with greater intensity in the future, and urban flooding is more likely to occur. Catastrophic flooding is often accompanied by water-borne diseases, including cholera, diarrhoea, typhoid, hepatitis and gastroenteritis. The trauma in the hearts of survivors who have lost a loved one can be difficult to recover from in a short time, producing anxiety, depression and post-traumatic stress disorder, and can exacerbate physical illness. Impacts such as the loss of crops, housing and other infrastructure also often translate into long-term problems such as malnutrition, poor maternal and child health care, and contamination of water sources with E. coli, further exacerbating the spread of infectious diseases.

== See also ==
- June 2024 South African storm complex
- 2022 KwaZulu-Natal floods
- Weather of 2022
