= Tornadoes in New Hampshire =

Locations of known tornado touchdowns in New Hampshire (1950 – present). Click on a peg to see details on that event.

- 1950s
- 1960s
- 1970s
- 1980s
- 1990s
- 2000s
- 2010s

Tornadoes are a relatively uncommon occurrence in New Hampshire, with only one or two touching down each year on average. Tornadic events primarily occur in the summer, with July featuring the most confirmed tornadoes. These storms are also more common over southern counties. The region's climate and mountainous topography serve to inhibit tornadic formation; however, conditions can still coalesce for small-scale events. The majority of these tend to be short-lived and weak, with a 1950–1990 average path length of 1.64 mi (2.64 km). The two strongest known tornadoes were rated F3 on the Fujita scale (Note: The Fujita scale was used to rate tornadoes, actively and through reanalysis, from 1950 to January 2007. On February 1, 2007, the Enhanced Fujita scale replaced the original and is presently used to assess tornado damage. Events previously analyzed with the old Fujita scale would retain their original assessment and would not be reassigned an EF-scale number.) and touched down on June 9, 1953, and August 20, 1968. However, a violent tornado on September 9, 1821, is believed to have caused EF4 damage and is considered the worst such storm in New Hampshire history. The early 1960s through the early 1970s featured an unusually active period for the state, with several years having four or more tornadoes; 1963 had nine confirmed tornadoes, the highest of any year. The most recent fatal tornado was an EF2 on July 24, 2008, that killed one person, damaged or destroyed 60 buildings, and impacted thousands of acres of forest.

Since 1950, tornadoes have collectively killed one person, injured forty others, and caused $12.6 million in damage. Inclusive of historical events, there have only been six fatal tornadoes in the state's history: May 23, 1782 (1 death), May 21, 1814 (1 death), September 9, 1821 (6 deaths), July 4, 1898 (3 deaths), July 23, 1946 (1 death), and July 24, 2008 (1 death).

Tornado listings between 1880 and 1949 are primarily based upon research by Thomas P. Grazulis and events from 1950 to the present are obtained from the National Climatic Data Center's storm event database. The works of Grazulis only cover significant tornadoes (F2–5), thus a complete record of events prior to 1950 is not available.

== Pre-1900 ==
- July 5 or 15, 1643 – A possible tornado impacts Hampton, Rockingham County, based on journal entries from Massachusetts Colonial Governor John Winthrop. However, due to scarce information it is uncertain if this was a true tornado or wind damage from a squall line.
- May 23, 1782 – A 0.5 mi (0.80 km) wide tornado originating from Wethersfield, Vermont, crosses the Connecticut River and impacts Claremont and Croydon in Sullivan County. Extensive damage takes place in Claremont, with nearly every structure in the tornado's path "raised to the foundation or racked or torn in a terrible manner", fields of grain swept away, and numerous trees uprooted. A ten-year-old child is killed in the town and her mother sustains serious injuries.
- August 15, 1787 – The "most extensive outbreak in early New England history", a series of tornadoes strike Connecticut, Massachusetts, New Hampshire, and Rhode Island on this day with the most severe of these occurring Connecticut. One tornado impacts Rochester, Strafford County, destroying a house, injuring two of its occupants, and a barn. Debris from the home was found up to 3 mi (4.8 km) away. Numerous trees are also downed or uprooted. David M. Ludlum lists a second tornado that affected Concord in Merrimack County; however, details are unknown.
- May 21, 1814 – A strong tornado impacts areas from Merrimack to Chester (Hillsborough and Rockingham counties). One person is killed in Merrimack when the tornado destroyed a barn he and four others sought shelter in. Large swaths of forest are destroyed along with several barns in various communities. Damage in Chester exceeded $1,000.
- September 9, 1821 – Referred to as the Great Tornado of 1821, or the Great New Hampshire Tornado, a powerful tornado, thought to have been equivalent to an EF4 with winds up to 200 mph (320 km/h), kills six people and injures hundreds more along a 45 mi (72 km) path. It is considered the most significant tornado in the state's history. The tornado originated along the Connecticut River and first struck Cornish, Sullivan County, destroying numerous trees with its damage path visible decades later. Croydon was struck next, with homes and barns destroyed. It then turned southeast into Sunapee—debris from the town was found in Andover—before growing to 0.5 mi (0.80 km) in diameter and entering Merrimack County. A millyard was destroyed in New London, with 30,000 board feet of timber hurled up to 30 mi (48 km) away, and orchards were devastated. Crossing Kearsarge Mountain, the tornado then descends into Warner, "[shattering homes] into small fragments and splinters." Effects from the storm in Warner remained visible for at least 60 years. It finally dissipated near Boscawen.
- July 16, 1880 – An F2 tornado moved through the southeastern part of Hanover, Grafton County, destroying three barns and one home. A dozen other homes sustained chimney and/or roof damage; one person was injured.
- May 16, 1890 – An F2 tornado in Rockingham County destroys a barn, killing a man inside after throwing him 150 ft (46 m).
- July 4, 1898 – A tornado kills 3 people and injures 120 others in Hampton Beach, Rockingham County. The tornado formed over a marsh near Hampton, and moved into the town. Large structures were shifted off their foundation and others were reported to be "blown flat", with debris found 200 ft (61 m) away. A skating rink collapsed, resulting in the three fatalities and numerous injuries.

== 1900–59 ==
- September 15, 1922 – An F2 tornado levels two barns, killing fifty cattle, along an 8 mi (13 km) path in Cheshire and Hillsborough counties.
- July 23, 1946 – A brief F1 tornado strikes Concord, Merrimack County, damaging eight homes and the roof of a National Guard armory. A garage and shed are also destroyed; a young boy is killed and his father is injured. Damage is estimated at $60,000.
- August 21, 1951 – An F2 tornado touched down in Rockingham County, removing part of the roof of a dairy farm near Atkinson and downing 25 trees. Grazulis does not list this event, indicating it may have only been F0–1 intensity.
- June 9, 1953 – An F3 tornado touches down west-southwest of Exeter, Rockingham County, and tracks along the north side of town. Fifteen homes and businesses sustain damage and the Exeter Country Club lodge is destroyed. Fifteen people are injured and damage reaches $100,000. Grazulis assessed the tornado to have been of F2 intensity. An F1 tornado also briefly touches down over Strafford County.
- July 31, 1954 – An F1 tornado touched down in Rockingham County, causing $25,000 in damage.
- October 24, 1955 – An F0 tornado touched down in Sullivan County, causing $25,000 in damage.
- June 27, 1956 – An F0 tornado touched down in Hillsborough County, causing $250 in damage.
- July 9, 1954 – An F0 tornado in Coos County caused $25,000 in damage.
- June 19, 1957 – An F2 tornado briefly tracked through Rockingham County, causing $25,000 in damage and an injury.
- August 27, 1959 – A waterspout touches down over Lake Monomonac, within Rindge, Cheshire County, and moves ashore. A 30 ft (9.1 m) wide swath of sand is gouged out by 2 to 3 ft (0.61 to 0.91 m). Two oak trees are "completely demolished" and a nearby cottage sustains significant window and façade damage. Another cottage that was under construction is shifted off its foundation by a few inches.

== 1960–79 ==
- June 24, 1960 – An F1 tornado touches down near Gilmanton, Belknap County, damaging a barn and shearing numerous trees. Debris from the barn is hurled 2 mi (3.2 km) away.
- July 2, 1961 – Two tornadoes touch down on this day, both of F2 intensity. The first touches down near Weare, Hillsborough County, destroying the roof of a barn before moving through a forested area. The second damages buildings near Salem, Rockingham County, and injures one person.
- July 21, 1961 – An F1 tornado damages several buildings in New Boston, Hillsborough County; trees and power lines are also downed.
- August 26, 1961 – A brief F1 tornado destroys a barn and downs trees along the Alstead–Surry town line in Cheshire County.
- July 9, 1962 –
- May 9, 1963 –
- May 14, 1963 –
- May 20, 1963 –
- June 9, 1963 –
- July 14, 1963 –
- July 18, 1963 –
- August 13, 1963 –
- June 27, 1964 –
- June 23, 1965 –
- July 14, 1965 –
- August 28, 1965 –
- July 13, 1966 –
- July 19, 1966 –
- July 26, 1966 –
- August 11, 1966 –
- July 12, 1967 –
- July 17, 1968 –
- July 19, 1968 –
- August 20, 1968 –
- June 6, 1969 –
- August 25, 1969 –
- July 16, 1970 –
- July 28, 1970 –
- August 17, 1970 –
- October 3, 1970 –
- May 31, 1972 –
- July 3, 1972 –
- July 19, 1972 –
- July 21, 1972 –
- August 9, 1972 –
- August 25, 1972 –
- May 11, 1973 –
- June 11, 1973 –
- August 27, 1974 –
- May 3, 1976 –
- August 15, 1976 –
- June 9, 1978 –
- June 19, 1978 –
- July 23, 1978 –

== 1980–99 ==
- August 8, 1980 – A short-lived F0 tornado touches down near Clarksville, Coos County, causing minor damage to a barn. After briefly lifting, it touches back down and causes a swath of tree damage 0.5 mi (0.80 km) long and several hundred yards wide.
- June 22, 1981 – An F2 tornado causes substantial tree damage along a 10 to 12 mi (16 to 19 km) path in a heavily wooded area west of New Durham, Strafford County. Several homes sustain collateral damage from fallen trees and downed power lines leave 2,000 residences without electricity.
- July 5, 1984 – A series of three F1 tornadoes touch down across Hillsborough and Cheshire counties, impacting areas near Pelham, Marlow, Harrisville, and Hancock. The first two tornadoes primarily cause tree and power line damage while the third causes some structural damage.
- June 16, 1986 – Amid widespread, damaging severe thunderstorms in the state, an F1 tornado touches down near the Marlborough–Dublin town line in Cheshire County before moving into Hillsborough County. Damage is primarily confined to forested areas, though several homes in Harrisville are impacted. Elsewhere, a garage is totally destroyed and 400–500 residences lose power.
- August 7, 1986 – Two F1 tornadoes touch down in Carroll County. The first forms over Lake Winnipesaukee and strikes Melvin Village before lifting. The tornado and a concurrent downburst snap or uproot hundreds of trees, many of which fell on homes, cars, and power lines. The second tornado formed near the Wakefield–Effingham town line, along the shores of Province Lake, and significantly damages one home before crossing into Maine.
- July 14, 1988 – A brief F1 tornado snaps and uproots trees, damages a shed, and downs power lines in western Chesterfield, Cheshire County.

Weather radar reflectivity imagery of severe thunderstorms on July 3, 1997, across southern New England; two tornadoes touched down in New Hampshire on this day.

- May 31, 1991 – An F0 tornado touches down in Hinsdale, Cheshire County, tearing the roof off a store while downing trees and power lines. A dumpster was picked up and hurled at a car along Route 63 before the tornado dissipated.
- August 2, 1993 – An F0 tornado touches down near Barrington, Strafford County, within an area of straight-line winds. Thousands of trees are downed and one home is destroyed; however, most of the damage resulted from the straight-line winds rather than the tornado.
- July 2, 1994 – A waterspout formed over Lake Francis in Coos County, uprooting and snapping several trees when it briefly moved onshore.
- July 23, 1995 – An F1 tornado struck New Hampton, Belknap County, damaging several homes and uprooting trees. Debris was thrown 0.25 mi (0.40 km) away in some instances.
- July 3, 1997 – A severe thunderstorm spawned two tornadoes, and several microbursts, on this day: an F1 in Swanzey, Cheshire County, and an F2 in Greenfield, Hillsborough County. The first tornado destroyed a horse barn and damaged an ice arena at the Cheshire Fairgrounds, and damage reached $500,000; one person was injured by broken glass. The second tornado destroyed a recycling facility, with wood and aluminum structures "torn apart", and damaged several other structures. Hundreds of trees were snapped or uprooted.
- May 31, 1998 – A narrow F2 tornado snaps or uproots numerous trees along a 0.5 mi (0.80 km) path just outside Antrim, Hillsborough County. Several structures, including an elementary school, sustain superficial damage.

== 2000 – present ==
- August 13, 2004 – An F0 tornado touches down north-northeast of Sanbornton, in Belknap County, and moves northeast along a 7 mi (11 km) intermittent path before dissipating without causing damage.
- May 21, 2006 – A small, short-lived F2 tornado touches down along Interstate 95, near Hampton Falls, in Rockingham County; a truck was lifted off the ground and thrown, injuring the two occupants.
- September 29, 2006 – An F0 tornado snaps or uproots dozens of trees south of Effingham in Carroll County.
- July 24, 2008 – The first fatal tornado in the state since 1946, a 0.5 mi (0.80 km) wide EF2 traveled along a 52 mi (84 km) path—making it the longest tracked event on record for New Hampshire—through the state over the course of 1 hour and 18 minutes. Nearly 100 homes were damaged or destroyed, and 8,000 acres (3,200 ha) of trees were snapped or uprooted, half of which was completely destroyed. One person was killed and two others were injured in Rockingham County. Forming within a bow echo complex, the tornado touched down over Rockingham County and traveled northeast, crossing through Merrimack, Belknap, Strafford, and Carroll counties before dissipating. Damage amounted to $2.027 million and the affected counties were placed under a presidential disaster declaration.
- June 5, 2010 – A brief EF0 tornado snaps or uproots several trees in Gorham within Coos County.
- July 26, 2011 – A weak EF0 tornado that touched down in Vermont crosses the Connecticut River and enters Coos County, downing or uprooting trees near Colebrook.
- August 21, 2011 – An EF1 tornado touches down in Canaan, Grafton County, snapping or uprooting hundreds of trees along its 2.7 mi (4.3 km) path. Several buildings sustain collateral damage from fallen trees and multiple outbuildings are damaged by the tornado itself.
- July 30, 2015 – A brief EF0 tornado touches down in Warner, Merrimack County, snapping or uprooting dozens of trees; a large storage building had a large portion of its roof torn off and thrown more than 200 yd (180 m) away.
- May 4, 2018 - An EF1 tornado tracked for 36 mi (58 km) through the state of New Hampshire, from Charlestown to Webster. The tornado, despite being the second longest in state history, took ten days for the National Weather Service to confirm.
- June 18, 2018 - Two EF0 tornadoes touched down in Grafton County, causing little damage.
- August 22, 2020 - Two EF0 tornadoes touched down in New Hampshire. One of them, in Carroll County, resulted in $5,000 in damage.
- May 16, 2022 - An EF1 tornado touched down in Sullivan County resulting in $6,000 in damage.
- July 18, 2022 - An EF1 tornado touched down north of Chesterfield, resulting in $2,000 in damage.
- July 27, 2023 - An EF1 tornado touched down in Cheshire County.
- June 23, 2024 - An EF1 tornado touched down near Dublin, New Hampshire.
- July 16, 2024 - An EF1 tornado touched down in Grafton County, causing $80,000 in damage.

== Statistics ==
Number of recorded tornadoes by month in New Hampshire
Month	Number of tornadoes
January	0
February	0
March	0
April	0
May	0
June	0
July	0
August	0
September	0
October	0
November	0
December	0
Unspecified	0

Tornadoes causing deaths and/or injuries in New Hampshire
Date	Counties	Deaths	Injuries
May 23, 1782	Sullivan	1	1
August 15, 1787	Strafford	0	2
May 21, 1814	Hillsborough, Rockingham	1	0
September 9, 1821	Sullivan, Merrimack	6	Hundreds
July 16, 1880	Grafton	0	1
May 16, 1890	Rockingham	0	0
July 4, 1898	Rockingham	3	120
July 23, 1946	Merrimack	1	1
June 9, 1953	Rockingham	0	15
July 3, 1997	Cheshire	0	1
May 21, 2006	Rockingham	0	2
July 24, 2008	Rockingham	1	2

== See also ==
- List of North American tornadoes and tornado outbreaks
- Tornadoes in New England
  - List of Connecticut tornadoes
  - List of Rhode Island tornadoes
