= Lists of tornadoes and tornado outbreaks =

These are some notable tornadoes, tornado outbreaks, and tornado outbreak sequences that have occurred around the globe.

1. Exact death and injury counts are not possible; especially for large events and events before 1955.
2. Prior to 1950 in the United States, only significant tornadoes are listed for the number of tornadoes in outbreaks.
3. Due to increasing detection, particularly in the U.S., numbers of counted tornadoes have increased markedly in recent decades although the number of actual tornadoes and counted significant tornadoes has not. In older events, the number of tornadoes officially counted is likely underestimated.

== Lists by geography ==
- List of African tornadoes and tornado outbreaks
- List of Asian tornadoes and tornado outbreaks
  - List of Bangladesh tornadoes
  - List of Indian tornadoes
  - List of Indonesian tornadoes
  - List of Taiwan tornadoes
  - List of Turkey tornadoes
  - List of Philippine tornadoes
  - List of Vietnam tornadoes
- List of European tornadoes and tornado outbreaks
  - List of United Kingdom tornadoes
- List of North American tornadoes and tornado outbreaks
  - List of United States tornadoes
    - List of Alabama tornadoes
      - List of tornadoes in Huntsville, Alabama
    - List of Alaska tornadoes
    - List of California tornadoes
    - List of Connecticut tornadoes
    - List of Delaware tornadoes
    - List of Hawaii tornadoes
    - List of Illinois tornadoes
    - List of Iowa tornadoes
    - List of Louisiana tornadoes
    - List of Massachusetts tornadoes
    - List of Michigan tornadoes
    - List of Minnesota tornadoes
    - List of Mississippi tornadoes
    - List of New Hampshire tornadoes
    - List of New York tornadoes
    - List of Ohio tornadoes
    - List of Oklahoma tornadoes
    - List of Rhode Island tornadoes
    - List of Texas tornadoes
    - List of tornadoes in Washington, D.C.
  - List of Canadian tornadoes and tornado outbreaks (pre-2000)
  - List of Canadian tornadoes and tornado outbreaks (2000–present)
  - List of fatal and violent Canadian tornadoes
- List of Australian tornadoes
- List of New Zealand tornadoes
- List of South American tornadoes and tornado outbreaks
  - List of Brazil tornadoes

== Other lists ==
- List of tornado outbreaks by outbreak intensity score
- List of tornado events by year
- List of individual tornadoes by year
- List of tornadoes striking downtown areas of large cities
- List of places hit multiple times by significant tornadoes
- List of F5, EF5, and IF5 tornadoes
- List of F4, EF4, and IF4 tornadoes
- List of F4 tornadoes (1950–1959)
- List of F4 tornadoes (1960–1969)
- List of F4 and EF4 tornadoes (2000–2009)
- List of F4 and EF4 tornadoes (2010–2019)
- List of F4, EF4, and IF4 tornadoes (2020–present)
- List of schools struck by tornadoes
- List of tropical cyclones spawning tornadoes
- List of tornadoes with confirmed satellite tornadoes
- List of tornadoes observed by mobile radars
- Tornado records, including several lists

== See also ==
- List of derecho events
- Outline of tropical cyclones
- Tornado climatology
- Tornado intensity
- Tornado myths
