= Tornadoes in New England =

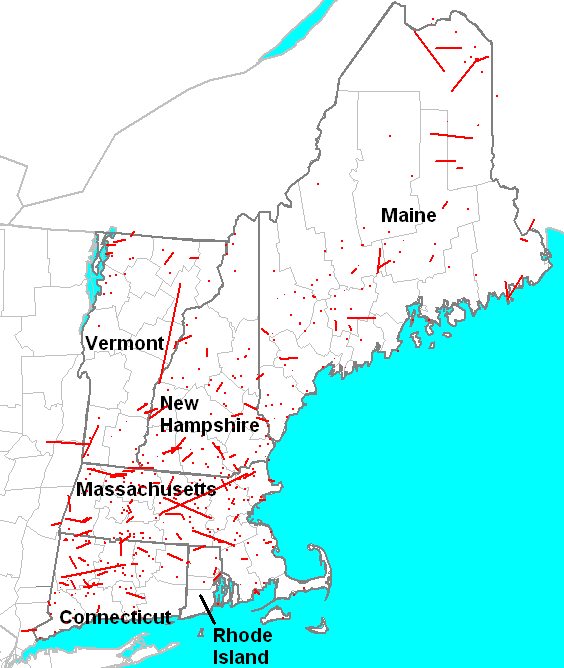
Paths of tornadoes in New England, 1950–2006

Tornadoes are fairly uncommon in the US region of New England. Fewer tornadoes are recorded here than anywhere else east of the Rocky Mountains. However, these deadly and destructive storms do occur; on average, about eight tornadoes are reported in the region each year. Almost 200 people have been killed by these storms in recorded history, and two of the ten most destructive tornadoes in US history occurred in this region.

== Climatology ==
New England tornadoes per year (1950–2010)
State	Per year	By area^{†}
Connecticut	1.5	2.8
Maine	1.9	0.5
Massachusetts	2.5	2.4
New Hampshire	1.5	1.6
Rhode Island	0.2	1.1
Vermont	0.7	0.7
National Climatic Data Center, US Census Bureau^{†}Avg. number tornadoes per year per 10,000 square miles (26,000 km^{2})

Tornadoes are a violent weather phenomenon that occur most often in the United States, to the east of the Rocky Mountains. However, they most often occur in the Southern and Central United States, and are comparatively rare in New England. However, no region is immune to tornadoes if the weather conditions are right.

While tornadoes have been recorded in almost every county in New England, there is a region just east of the Berkshires with a much higher concentration of tornado occurrences. This area is analogous to the Tornado Alley of the Great Plains, but on a much smaller scale.

On average (1950–2008), more than two tornadoes per year strike the state of Massachusetts alone, with New England as a whole recording more than 8. Most tornadoes reported in the region are "weak", rated EF0 or EF1 on the Enhanced Fujita scale (the Fujita scale prior to 2007). Around 30% are "significant" tornadoes (rated EF2 or greater), and only 1% are violent (rated EF4 or EF5, the highest damage rating). Weak tornadoes occur in all areas of New England, but EF3 or greater tornadoes have been reported only in New England's practical "Tornado Alley" of Massachusetts, Connecticut, and southern New Hampshire.

Peak tornado activity in New England occurs during the summer months of June, July and August. Tornadoes typically strike between 3 and 9 pm local time, and move at a forward speed of around 30 miles per hour (48 km/h).

== Notable tornadoes ==
=== Deadliest ===
There have been 34 killer tornadoes in New England's recorded history:

- August 15, 1787: The Four-State Tornado Swarm caused damage in Connecticut, Rhode Island, Massachusetts, and New Hampshire. Two people were killed by a tornado in Wethersfield, Connecticut, and many were injured throughout New England.
- September 9, 1821: Several tornadoes struck northern and central New England, including the Great New Hampshire Tornado, which killed 6 people in New Hampshire, and another which killed two people in Massachusetts.
- August 9, 1878: A violent tornado killed either 29 or 34 people in Wallingford, Connecticut.
- July 16, 1879: Two people were killed by a tornado in Pittsfield, Massachusetts.
- July 26, 1890: A tornado killed eight people in Lawrence, Massachusetts.
- July 4, 1898: A tornado struck Hampton Beach, New Hampshire, a popular resort town. More than 100 people sought refuge in the skating rink, and three people were killed and 120 injured when the roof collapsed. Twenty cottages were also destroyed. A yacht was overturned by the storm, drowning five people, but it is unclear whether this was due to the tornado.
- June 9, 1953: The 1953 Worcester tornado killed 94 people as it damaged or destroyed thousands of homes in central Massachusetts, including the city of Worcester.
- August 28, 1973: A tornado touched down near Canaan, New York, and moved into western Massachusetts. Three people were killed in West Stockbridge when a truck stop was completely destroyed, and another person died in a destroyed house nearby.

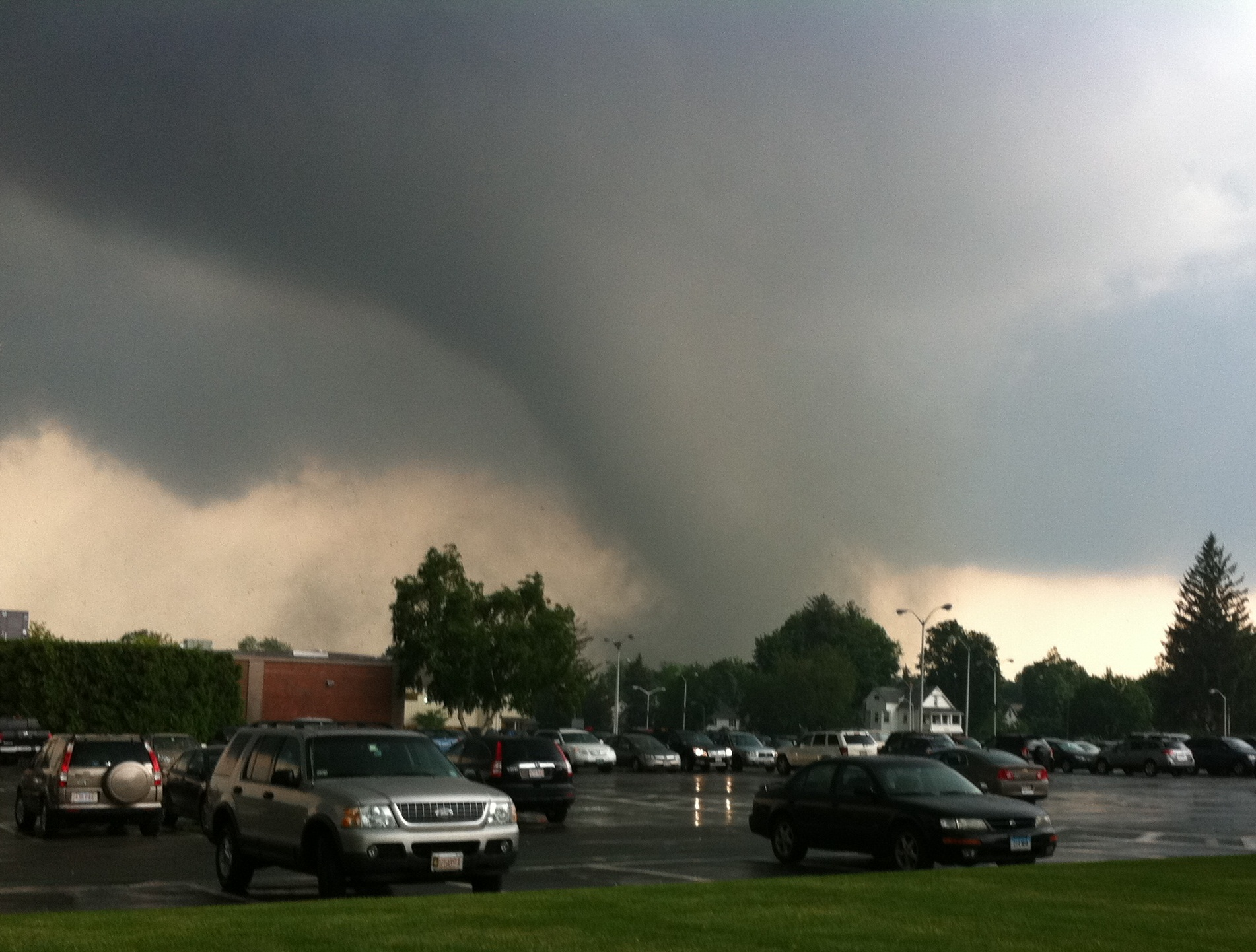
The June 1, 2011 tornado which killed three people in and around Springfield, Massachusetts

- August 10, 1979: A tornado struck a boy scout camp in Paxton, Massachusetts, downing trees and killing two scouts.
- October 3, 1979: A violent tornado killed three people in Windsor Locks, Connecticut.
- May 29, 1995: A violent tornado killed three people in Great Barrington, Massachusetts and the surrounding area.
- July 24, 2008: An EF2 tornado travelled 50 miles across five counties in New Hampshire, killing one woman in Deerfield, New Hampshire
- June 1, 2011: A strong tornado killed three people in western Massachusetts, striking downtown Springfield.

Only two tornadoes in the history of New England have killed more than 10 people: the 1953 Worcester Tornado and the 1878 Wallingford tornado. The Worcester Tornado killed as many as 94 people in Worcester, Massachusetts, on June 9, 1953, and the Wallingford Tornado killed as many as 34 in Wallingford, Connecticut, on August 8, 1878. These two tornadoes, both estimated to be of F4 intensity on the Fujita scale, killed more people than the rest of the tornadoes in the region's recorded history combined. Since most New England tornadoes are weak and short-lived, it is understandable why tornadoes causing fatalities are a rare occurrence.

=== Costliest ===
Of the costliest tornadoes in US history (adjusted for inflation), two occurred in New England: The 1979 Windsor Locks, Connecticut tornado, which caused $200 million in damage ($887 million in 2025 US$), and the 1953 Worcester tornado, which caused $52 million in damage ($626 million in 2025 US$). The Worcester tornado damaged or destroyed thousands of homes over a wide swath of central Massachusetts; the Windsor Locks tornado by contrast had a relatively small damage path, but it caused significant damage to parts of Bradley International Airport, including the New England Air Museum, where dozens of expensive and historic aircraft were damaged or destroyed, leading to the large damage figure.

== See also ==
- List of Connecticut tornadoes
- List of Rhode Island tornadoes
