= Tornadoes in Massachusetts =

Summary of tornadoes impacting Massachusetts

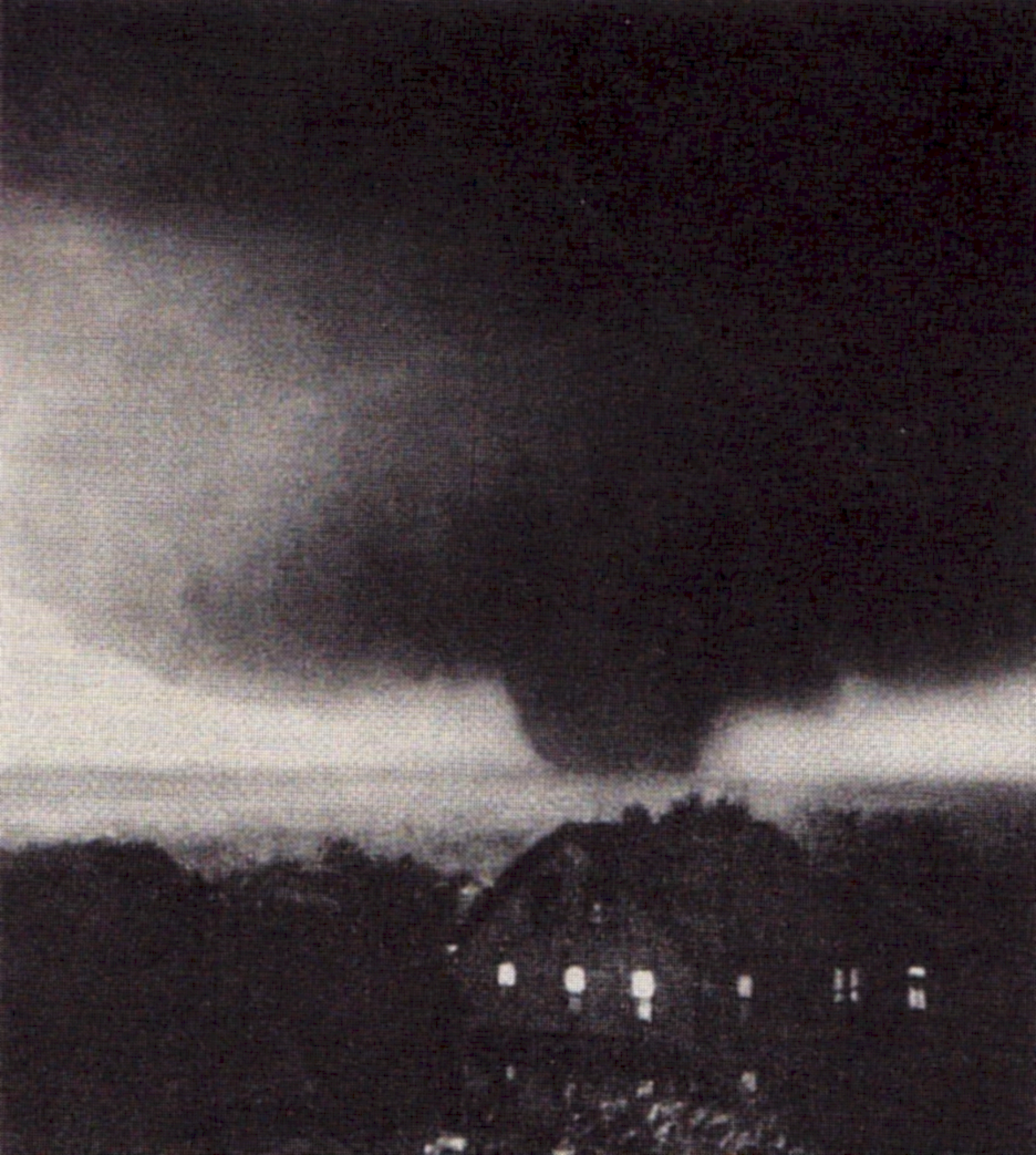
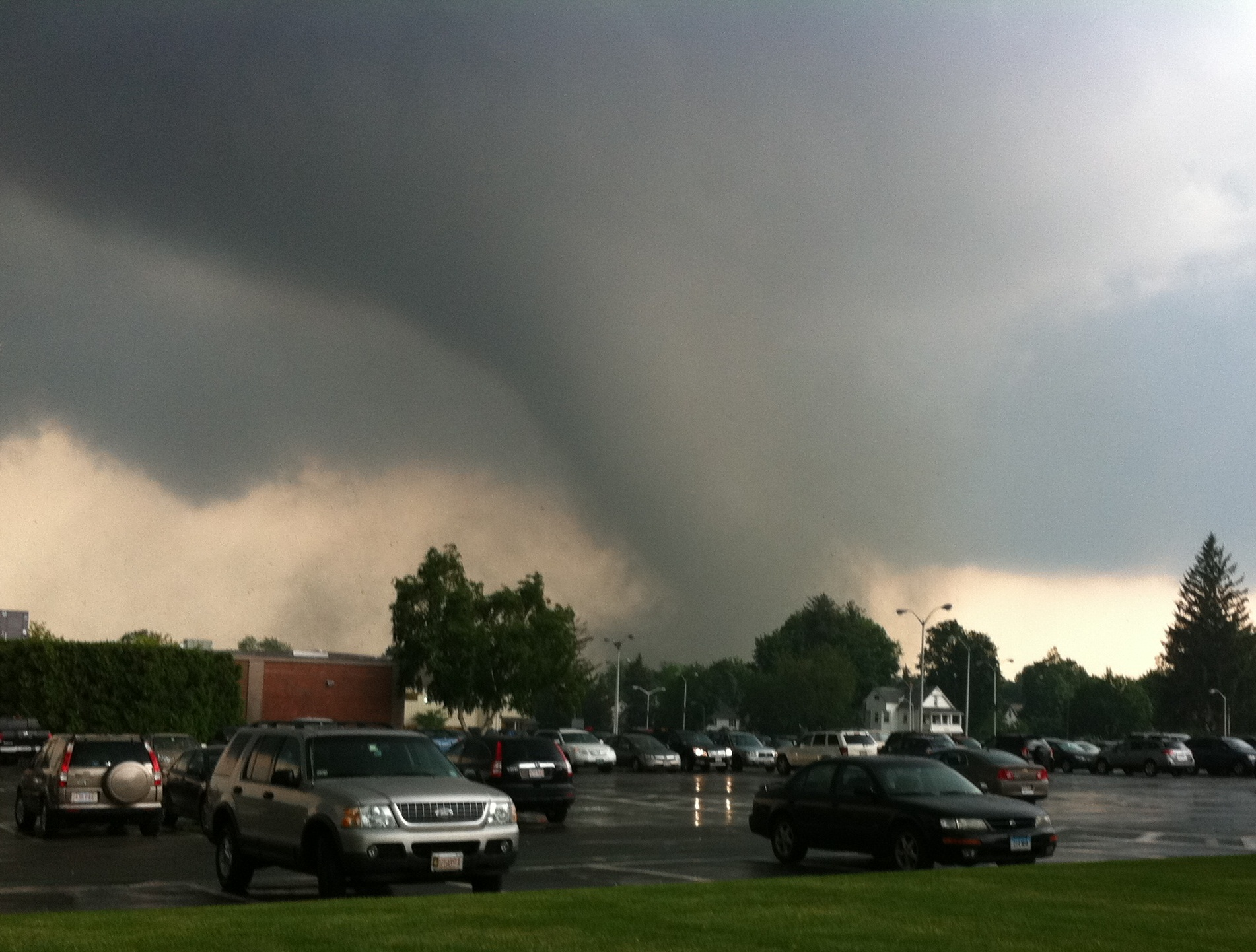
- Worcester tornado near Lake Quinsigamond; 2011 Springfield tornado as it tore through the South End neighborhood
- Tornadoes statewide: 205 (1950-2010)
- Location of max. windspeeds: 207-260 mph (517 km/h) Worcester, Massachusetts F4 tornado on June 9, 1953
- Fatalities: >105
- Injuries: >1,562
- Deadliest single tornado: 94 deaths Worcester F4 tornado on June 9, 1953

Tornadoes have sporadically impacted the U.S. state of Massachusetts since at least the 17th century, when multiple suspected and confirmed tornadoes caused damage to the then-British colony. Massachusetts is far removed from the traditional Tornado Alley, as its far northeastern position in the Contiguous United States usually causes the necessary collision of cool, dry air from the Southwest, and warm, humid, air from the Gulf of Mexico to be far to the state's southwest. However, tornadoes, including strong to violent (E/F4) tornadoes still occasionally occur in Massachusetts, at a rate of 1.4 tornadoes per 10,000 square miles per year. The first tornado recorded in Massachusetts was likely one of two probable tornadoes recorded in 1671, in Cape Ann and Rehoboth. The first confirmed tornado was in 1680, in Lexington, which caused possibly the first recorded tornado fatality in history. By far the most significant tornado in Massachusetts history is the Worcester tornado of 1953, which caused 94 of the 105 recorded fatalities in Massachusetts tornado history.

== Climatology ==
Generally, tornadoes in Massachusetts occur in the summer months of June and July, which allows for the greater heat and moisture required for tornadoes to push into the state. This aligns with the general trend of tornado frequency moving north as the year progresses, due to the absence of sufficient heat and moisture in the early months of the year.

While the Atlantic Ocean provides ample heat and moisture in the summer, very rarely does the state see required elevated mixed layer that helps build instability in the atmosphere. Since the elevated mixed layer originates over the southeast, a very precise atmospheric setup needs to be in place to transport the stable air to Massachusetts untouched. This setup involves a prominent upper-level ridge over the southeastern United States, as well as a rather intense upper-level trough in eastern Canada, which is quite rare due to the decreased strength of the jet stream in the summer. A 2004 paper found that only 34 times since 1970 an elevated mixed layer associated with a significant severe weather had occurred in the Northeastern United States.

Since tornadoes in Massachusetts almost exclusively form in the summer, wind shear is also less common and less intense. The jet stream also drives the formation of low pressure areas, which cause the southerly winds that create shear with more westerly upper-level winds. Since the jet stream is weaker in the summer, generally both less intense low-level and upper-level winds are observed.

Intense to violent tornadoes are generally confined to Worcester County and the extreme western Berkshires, on the border with New York. Tornadoes in the Berkshires are likely influenced by complex terrain of area. After leaving the Catskills in New York, supercells are aided by locally enhanced moisture and southerly winds in the Hudson River Valley due to valley channeling. In addition, the complex terrain of the Berkshires can cause the mesocyclones of supercells to stretch, increasing rotational velocity and potentially leading to tornadogenesis. The violent Great Barrington tornado, which began just east of the New York border, west of Great Barrington, was aided by both of these factors.

== History ==
=== Pre–1700 ===
Date	F/EF#	Deaths	Injuries	Hardest-hit community
July 5, 1643	?	1	0	Essex County
This storm was possibly the first recorded tornado, although Thomas Grazulis believes it was likely a downburst or severe straight-line wind gust. Massachusetts governor John Winthrop observed "a sudden gust that whipped up dust, lifted up his meeting house, and killed a nearby observer with a fallen tree."
1671	F1	0	0	Cape Ann
A "whirlwind" crossed a neck on Cape Ann, likely near Gloucester, Massachusetts. Although it was only about 40 feet wide, it "bore away whatever it met in the way, both small and great trees," A large rock in the harbor was also turned over.
August, 1671	F1	0	0	Rehobeth
First Rehobeth Tornado – This probable tornado, the first of three to impact Rehobeth, was documented by Rev. William Adams of Ipswich in his diary. Mentioned on October 16th, 1671, the tornado is said to have been 330 feet wide and to have possibly tracked for 15 miles, about a mile and a half south of the town, in the vicinity of modern-day Seekonk. Adams reported the tornado "[tore] up by the roots, or [broke] the bodies of almost all trees within its compass saving only some small and low ones."
July 8, 1680	F1	1	0	Lexington
See article on this tornado – The first confirmed, observed tornado in United States history caused damage to a barn and snapped many large trees. Rev. Increase Mather recorded two detailed eyewitness accounts in An Essay for the Recording of Illustrious Providences. John Robbins, a servant, was killed due to bruises and broken bones sustained from flying debris. Robbins is possibly the first recorded tornado fatality.

=== 1700 – 1799 ===
Date	F/EF#	Deaths	Injuries	Hardest-hit community
July 10, 1738	F0	0	0	Boston
A waterspout developed over a pond by Boston before coming ashore. A man-made wildfire in the nearby woods was extinguished by the landfalling storm. The storm, which carried many logs of great magnitude, injured nearby observers.
July 28, 1748	F2	0	0	Pepperell
Around 1 P.M. a significant tornado touched down in Pepperell, causing damage to structures and forest. Moving northeast, the tornado uprooted apple trees, indian corn, and hay, which was found over a mile away. The roof of a church was destroyed, as well as the roofs of various other nearby buildings. A wing of a house, in which soldiers were garrisoned, was instantly demolished. A woman and her three children in the main room of the house attempted to flee, but were trapped inside by the debris of the garrisoned wing. The house she had intended to run to "had stood only the underpinning remained to mark the spot; so thorough had been the work of its demolition that not even the sills were in their places." Damage amounted to 500 pounds.
July 31, 1758	F1	0	0	Chelsea or Rumney Marsh
A tornado formed in the southeast and passed through Chelsea or Rumney Marsh. The storm was about 80 feet wide and tore down mature oak, elm, and apple trees. A stone wall was torn apart, and a cart loaded with hay was thrown from a barn, which was partially destroyed. It shook a dwelling so violently the residents expected the house to be turned over.
July 10, 1759	F4	1	10	Leicester
Leicester tornado – A violent tornado touched down in Spencer and moved northeast through the town of Leicester. Samuel Lynde's farm, including a house, barn, and corn barn, was completely destroyed, with 10 or 12 people inside. Among those sheltered inside, several were seriously injured and one died; a horse was killed as well. A girl was flung 200 yards away and was found with a broken collar bone. Nails from the home were found embedded so firmly that they could not be removed without a hammer. A watch was found a mile away, and other debris was found up to 10 miles away in Holden. A new pile of wood boards measuring 5,000 feet total was reduced to "kindling wood." The home was reduced to its foundation, with only the sills remaining. Silverware from the house could not be found, and beds from the house were found hanging from trees a distance away. Large trees were torn out with their roots and an orchard of apple trees was demolished and deposited near the foundation of the house. Logs stuck in mud, 2-3 feet in diameter, were rolled, and a spar from the house was flung from the house and flew into a neighbor's house, damaging a wall. The Lynde family would move to Claremont, New Hampshire, and Samuel's son, Charles, would go on to serve in the Revolutionary War.
September 14, 1765	F1	0	0	Dartmouth
A tornado, moving east-southeast, blew down corn and fences and carried two doors away in the northern part of town. On Rev. Thomas West's property, apples trees were destroyed.
August 18, 1770	F1	0	0	Salem
In the morning, a weak and heavily rainwrapped tornado impacted the south side of Salem. The tornado was rather narrow and only damaged some chimneys and roofs, and blew down some trees.
August 14, 1773	F3	0	2	Essex County
Merrimack River tornado – A rare northwest moving tornado began as a waterspout on the Merrimack River before sweeping up the north bank, striking Salisbury Point, before crossing the Powow River and continuing into Amesbury, and Haverhill at 7:45 A.M. Nearly every structure from Salisbury Point to Amesbury was damaged, a total of over 150 buildings. Eight houses and six shops at Salisbury Point were completely leveled, and many other houses, barns, and shops were damaged. In Amesbury, Captain Smith's sailmaking shop was swept away with him still inside, although he survived with a broken leg. Also in Amesbury where construction was much newer, one house and four shops were leveled, and many other structures were damaged. In Haverhill, a nearly new, well-built home, was reduced to its foundation, with only the chimney remaining. Two newly made ships, 90 tons each, were thrown 20 feet, and a large oak post was thrown 40 yards. Orchards and fences were torn apart and new wood planks were strewn everywhere.
March 9, 1774	F2	0	0	Nantucket
A short lived tornado struck Nantucket in the morning. During its one minute lifespan, it completely destroyed the lighthouse, and damaged numerous shops and barns.
June 23, 1782	F2	0	0	Dalton
Part of a small tornado outbreak across New England, around noon this tornado struck the former town of Ashuelot-Equivalent, near modern-day Dalton. Many trees were torn from the ground and trees up to a yard in diameter were twisted off six feet off the ground. Two houses belonging to Jeremiah Cady, one of which was under construction, were both lifted from their foundations and dashed to pieces on the ground.
July 22, 1784	F1	0	0	Amesbury
A weak evening tornado tracked for 6 miles through Amesbury and destroyed a cider house, a barn, and the frame of a new house. Apple orchards in Amesbury and modern day Newburyport were destroyed, with mature trees uprooted.
August 15, 1787	F3	0	2	Framingham
Part of the Four-State Tornado Swarm – A tornado touched down in Northborough around 3 P.M. and moved southeast between Marlborough and Southborough, and continued through western Framingham. In Marlborough, a roof was ripped off a house and a barn was completely destroyed. Shingles with their nails still attached were found driven into tree trunks. In Southborough, a house was unroofed and a cider mill and barn were destroyed, as well as the associated apple orchard. Topsoil was blown away at Lieutenant Fay's pasture. In west Framingham, a house was lifted from its foundation and dashed to pieces, injuring two women inside. Across the track of the tornado sturdy trees were twisted off, large stones were displaced, and large trees were hurled long distances.
August 15, 1787	F2	0	1	Glocester, Rhode Island
Part of the Four-State Tornado Swarm – Around 5 P.M., a tornado touched down in Killingly, Connecticut and began moving northeast. The tornado tracked through northeast Glocester, Rhode Island, where it destroyed barns, apple orchards, and one old house, where a family escaped with minor injuries by hiding in a cellar. The damage, 200 to 550 yards in width, continued through mostly rural forest, flattening fences and groves, while doing minor damage to a chimney. The tornado lifted in Mendon, after a path of 20 miles.
June 10, 1788	F1	0	0	Granville
In the afternoon, a tornado unroofed buildings and threw a nearly constructed barn was thrown from its foundation and destroyed it. Fruit trees were torn up by their roots and other large trees were broken and twisted off. Fences were blown down and a roof of a barn was carried a long distance.
July 6, 1788	F2	0	7	Shutesbury
A tornado formed at 3 A.M. over Lake Wyola, north of Shutesbury. A home, with seven people sleeping inside, was struck, destroying it. Trees, fences, and a nearby barn were also destroyed. The seven people inside all survived with injuries.
August 19, 1788	F1	0	0	Lee
Around 4 P.M. a tornado unroofed houses and blew down fences. Corn and fruit trees were destroyed, and four cows were killed. The tornado was related to a hurricane that did significant damage in the Caribbean before moving up the Eastern Seaboard.
June 24, 1789	F1	0	0	Williamstown
In Williamstown, a tornado lifted the frame of a barn under construction and smashed it to pieces on the ground. Barely a piece of timber was left intact.
June 25, 1792	F1	0	0	Leyden
Half past 3 P.M., a weak tornado moved northeast through Leyden. Several houses were damaged, with shingles or whole roofs removed. One barn was lifted and carried 60 yards before being destroyed. Wood boards were carried up to 110 yards, and large trees were carried 35 yards. Some doors were stripped of wood and torn away from the wall by their hinges. Trees were torn up by the roots or twisted off.
June 19, 1793	F1	0	0	Stockbridge
A tornado began north of downtown Stockbridge, moving southeast. A barn was unroofed, with wood boards carried over 300 yards away. Over 1000 yards of fence was damaged.
July 6, 1793	F1	0	0	Andover
A tornado blew a large new barn to pieces and twisted off a large oak tree two feet above its roots. Many fences were blown down. Hail from the associated supercell did damage to the towns of Sandown, Plaistow and Ipswich.
October 15, 1795	F3	0	4	Winchendon
A seasonally unusual tornado began between five and six P.M., southwest of Winchendon, moving northeast. At least eight houses as well as a number of barns or shops in the town were destroyed or damaged. One resident noticed the sound of the storm, and upon opening the door, saw the debris flying through the air. He ran back inside just before the tornado overtook his house and heavily damaged it. Clothing, furniture, crops, and other items were scattered about the town. Fields, gardens, and hundreds of acres of forest were all destroyed.
October 21, 1799	F1	0	0	Dorchester
A nocturnal tornado unroofed two houses and a number of barns. The spire of a meeting house was destroyed down to the bell of the tower.

=== 1800 – 1899 ===
Date	F/EF#	Deaths	Injuries	Hardest-hit community
June 12, 1800	F2	0	0	Reading
Between 3 and 4 P.M. a large tornado moved southeast through Reading and North Reading. Houses were unroofed and barns, stables, and sheds were blown to pieces. Stone walls were blown down almost to their foundation. Many trees were broken off and thrown into nearby structures.
May 29, 1801	F1	1	0	Heath
A tornado leveled whole forests, blew down barns and broke windows. The tornado was described to be a momentary cloud of thunder, wind, hail and rain. Lightning struck a house in which eight or nine people were sheltered, killing one 16-year-old boy.
June 13, 1802	F1	0	0	Southampton
Around 6:30 P.M. a black cloud descended on Southampton from the southwest. The tornado moved through the town with great speed, destroying trees, fences and some buildings. Three barns were instantly destroyed and a fourth was badly damaged. Debris was carried many rods in the air. Apple trees were uprooted and maple and oak trees were twisted off near the ground.
September 22, 1802	F1	0	0	Methuen
Around 2 P.M. a tornado began in Methuen, 100 to 150 yards wide, moving northeast. A number of orchards were destroyed and apple trees were thrown up to 300 yards. A cow was thrown over a wall and injured. Many stone walls were destroyed and heavy foundation rocks were moved.
September 22, 1802	F2	0	0	Salisbury
A low precipitation, northeast moving tornado, about 160 yards wide, swept through Newburyport and Salisbury. In Newburyport, two barns were destroyed and a house was heavily damaged. After crossing the Merrimack River the tornado moved into Salisbury, damaging two homes, completely destroying a barn, and unroofing another barn. An orchard of oak trees was heavily damaged, with 80 to 90 acres of trees twisted off two to three feet off the ground.
September 9, 1821	F4	2	30	Franklin County
See article on this tornado – Part of the September 1821 New England tornado outbreak, this tornado did extensive damage to the towns of Northfield, Warwick, and Orange.
July 24, 1890	F3	8	63	Essex County
1890 South Lawrence tornado - a tornado touched down around 9:00 am in Lawrence destroying three dozen homes and damaging another 60.

=== 1900 – 1999 ===
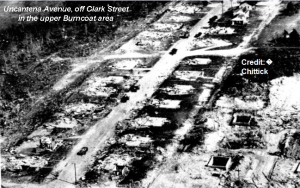
Houses reduced to foundations by the Worcester tornado

Date	F/EF#	Deaths	Injuries	Hardest-hit community
June 9, 1953	F4	94	1,288	Worcester
See article on this tornado – The strongest, deadliest, and most damaging tornado in New England history tracked for 48 miles from the Quabbin Reservoir to Framingham. Among the worst-damaged areas of Barre, Worcester, Shrewsbury, Southborough, and Westborough, over 4,000 buildings were destroyed, including a brick building at Assumption College that was reduced by three floors.
May 29, 1995	F4	3	24-27	Great Barrington
See article on this tornado – A violent tornado did extensive damage to the town of Great Barrington and the Ski Butternut ski resort. 2 students and one staff member from the Eagleton School died.

=== 2000 – present ===
Date	F/EF#	Deaths	Injuries	Hardest-hit community
June 1, 2011	EF3	3	200	Springfield
See article on this tornado – This high-end EF3 tornado caused significant damage over a 38 mile track from Westfield to Charlton. Damages amounted to $227.6 million (2011 USD).
