= List of Connecticut weather records =

The following is a list of Connecticut weather records observed at various stations across the state during the last 100 years. Connecticut is a state in the Northeast region of the United States.

== Temperature ==
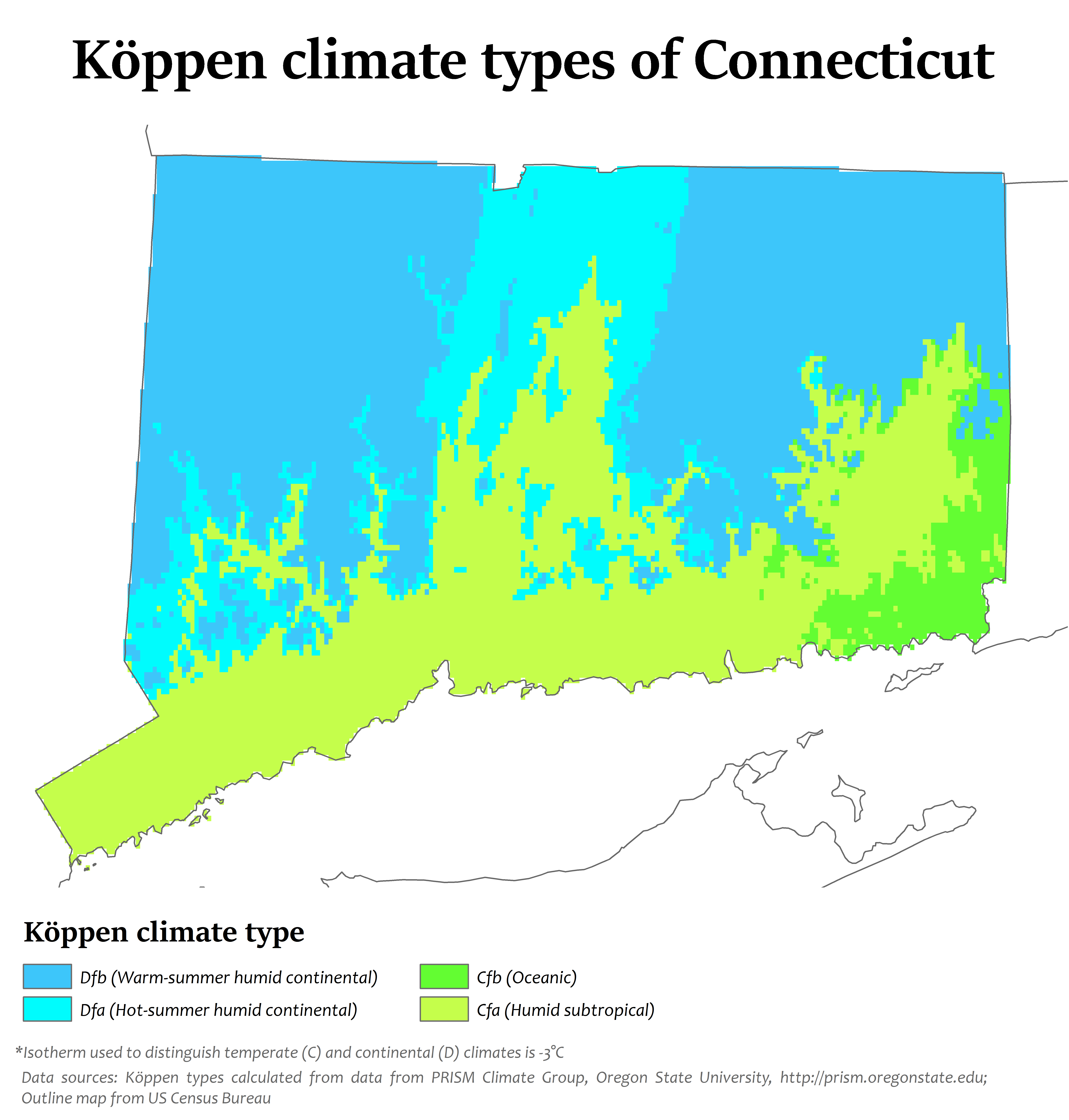
Köppen climate types in Connecticut

Event	Measurement	Date	Location
Highest Temperature	106 °F (41 °C)	23 August 1916	Torrington, CT
Highest Temperature	106 °F (41 °C)	15 July 1995	Danbury, CT
Lowest Temperature	−32 °F (−36 °C)	16 February 1943	Norfolk, CT “The Ice Box of CT”
Lowest Temperature	−32 °F (−36 °C)	22 January 1961	Coventry, CT

== Precipitation ==
=== Rain ===
Event	Measurement	Date	Location
Most rain in 24 hours	12.77 in (32.4 cm)	19 August 1955	Burlington, CT

=== Snow ===
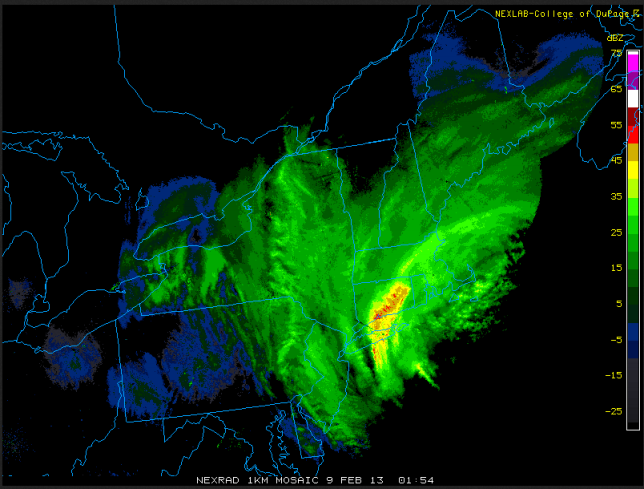
Radar image showing the intensity of the snowfall over Connecticut the evening of 8 February 2013.

Event	Measurement	Date	Location
Most snow, 24 hours	36 inches (91 cm)	8–9 February 2013	Ansonia, CT

=== Tornadoes ===
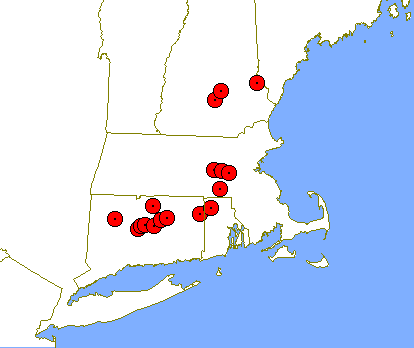
A map of towns which reported damage. Not all of these damage areas were definitely tornadic, and some tornadoes hit more than one town.

Between 1953 and 2004, there was an average of one tornado per year within Connecticut.

Event		Date	Location
Earliest recorded tornado outbreak	Four-State Tornado Swarm	15 August 1787	New England

Event			Date	Location
Deadliest tornado	Wallingford tornado	34	9 August 1878	Southern Connecticut

== See also ==
=== General ===
- List of weather records

=== Large-scale events that affected Connecticut ===
- Hurricane Sandy
- 2011 Halloween nor'easter
- 1938 New England hurricane
- Great Blizzard of 1888
