= 1680 Lexington, Massachusetts tornado =

Weather event in Massachusetts

Meteorological history
- Formed: July 8, 1680, 2:00 p.m. EST (UTC–05:00)

F1 tornado
- on the Fujita scale

Overall effects
- Fatalities: 1
- Injuries: 1+
- Areas affected: Lexington, Massachusetts

On July 8, 1680, a tornado impacted the town of Cambridge Farms, Massachusetts, in present day Lexington, Massachusetts. This tornado was the first confirmed tornado in recorded history in the United States, and was described by two eyewitnesses in Rev. Increase Mather's essay Remarkable Providences.

Although modern-day Cambridge, Massachusetts is located on the northern bank of the Charles River, near Boston, this tornado likely occurred in present day Lexington. At the time of writing Remarkable Providences, "Cambridge" likely referred to the community of Cambridge Farms, located roughly 10 miles north in present day Lexington. Properties impacted by the storm were all listed in other documents in Cambridge Farms, increasing confidence that the tornado actually occurred in Lexington.

Samuel Stone, a local resident, stated that around 2:00 P.M. he observed a cloud, likely a supercell thunderstorm in the northwest moving in opposition to the southerly surface wind, which made a singing noise in the air. The wind increased until the tornado touched down "in the mead." According to Stone, as the tornado passed by it sucked him up and whirled about the hay nearby. The tornado passed him and his house, and moved over a hill, tearing down several trees. There, it tore off the roof of Stone's barn and persisted towards Matthew Bridge's house. Prior to reaching Bridge's house, the tornado tore down more crops before lifting for a quarter-mile, before it replanted with more violent motion.

Matthew Bridge described a thick, black cloud, filled with stones and bushes, moving in continually circular motion. As the tornado passed over him, he observed a "light pillar as he judged about eight or ten foot diameter, which seemed to him like a screw or solid body." The tornado tore up old trees, roots, and parts of the ground, and threw large stones so far that they could not be found. The tornado persisted for another mile and a half after passing Bridge, creating damage up to a half-mile wide. One boy attempted to run out into the storm, and got so close that the tornado "passed so near them as almost to touch their feet," but miraculously survived. John Robbins, a servant, was killed by injuries sustained when he was pelted by debris. Robbins is perhaps the first recorded tornado victim in the United States.

== Other possible first recorded tornadoes in the U.S. ==
- July 5, 1643 – A "sudden gust" in Essex County, Massachusetts caused damage to a meetinghouse and killed a nearby observer. Thomas Grazulis in Significant Tornadoes (1680-1991) stated the storm was likely a downburst or gust front.
- 1671 – A "whirlwind" crossed a neck on Cape Ann, likely near Gloucester, Massachusetts. Although it was only about 40 feet wide, it "bore away whatever it met in the way, both small and great trees". A large rock in the harbor was also turned over.
- August, 1671 – Possible tornadic damage was documented by Rev. Williams Adams in Rehoboth, Massachusetts, who visited in October. For a path of up to 15 miles and 300 feet in width, a storm felled many large trees, sparing only small trees.

== See also ==
- List of Connecticut Tornadoes – Mather also recorded the 1682 New Haven tornado in his book
- History of tornado research
