= List of African tornadoes and tornado outbreaks =

These are some notable tornadoes, tornado outbreaks, and tornado outbreak sequences that have occurred in Africa.

== Chad ==
Event	Date	Area	Tornadoes	Casualties	Notes
Ndjamena tornado	2 May 2007	Ndjamena, Chad	1	9 fatalities, 100 injuries	A rare tornado struck Ndjamena, destroying 50 homes and killing nine people.
Bebedjia tornado	9 May 2007	Bebedjia, Chad	2	14 fatalities, >150 injuries; town was destroyed	An extremely rare and violent tornado tore through Bebedjia, reportedly destroying 95% of the town. The tornado struck at 4:00 pm, and was followed by an equally violent storm six hours later.

== Democratic Republic of the Congo ==
Event	Date	Area	Tornadoes	Casualties	Notes
2003 Yumbi tornado	2 February 2003	Yumbi, Democratic Republic of the Congo	1	17 fatalities, 4,000 injuries	An extremely rare tornado swept through areas near the town of Yumbi. 1,700 families were made homeless by the tornado.
2006 Oicha tornado	8 March 2006	Oicha	1	3 fatalities, 66 injuries	A "tornado like storm" damaged thousands of buildings, about 1/3 of the total buildings in the town of Oicha. This included houses, schools, churches, commercial buildings, and hospitals. Three were killed and 66 were injured, including 3 in critical condition.

== South Africa ==
Event	Date	Area	Tornadoes	Casualties	Notes
Roodepoort, South Africa	26 November 1948	Highveld	1	4 fatalities, 100 injuries	700 homes wrecked, damages estimated at R150 million. This tornado made a track of 64 km and had touched down 15 times.
Zastron, South Africa tornado	26 November 1948	Free State	1	-	
Albertynesville, South Africa tornado	30 November 1952	South Africa	-	20 fatalities, 400 injuries	Cars were lifted 100 feet into the air by the tornado.
Paynesville, South Africa tornado	2 December 1952	South Africa	-	11 fatalities	The tornado "threw cattle high into the air".
Trompsburg, South Africa tornado	5 November 1976	Karoo	-	5 fatalities	F3 rated tornado which tracked a 175 km long path, mainly through farmland.
Senekal, South Africa tornado	15 September 1988	South Africa	-	2 fatalities	F3 that tracked a 100 km path over mostly open farmland, killing two children and damaging power lines.
Welkom, South Africa tornado	20 March 1990	Free State	-	destroying 4000 homes	F4 Multi-vortex tornado raced through the suburbs of Welkom with a 240 km long severe storm front and a width of up to 1.7 km. Proved to be the most devastating tornado (in monetary terms) in South Africa's history.
Harrismith tornado	15 November 1998	Free State	1	0 fatalities, 14 injuries	F2 according to Weather Service. Several houses and three airplane hangars were damaged or destroyed.
Umtata (Mthatha)tornado	15 December 1998	Eastern Cape	1	18 fatalities, 150 injuries	Category unknown. Large amounts of damage was caused including damage to the hospital. Nelson Mandela, previous president of South Africa was in a pharmacy when the tornado hit, and was protected by his bodyguards while lying on the floor. The pharmacy was also damaged, but Mandela was not injured.3 days later Mandela declared Umtata in a state of emergency at Bridge Street taxi rank outside the shop that suffered 11 fatalities.
Mount Ayliff, South Africa tornado	18 January 1999	South Africa	-	25 fatalities, 500 injuries	120 km long track F4
Heidelberg, South Africa tornado	21 October 1999	South Africa	-	20 injuries	100+ km path narrowly missed Johannesburg
Centurion tornado	21 October 1999	Gauteng	1	unknown fatality, unknown injuries	F1 according to Weather Service. Damage was caused.
Mpumalanga, South Africa tornado outbreak	9 September 2002	Mpumalanga	4	2 fatalities	Strong line of storms. Some buildings completely flattened
Dullstroom tornado	1 August 2006	Mpumalanga	1	0 fatalities, 11 injuries	Several homes damaged, roof a high school completely removed. Estimated to be strong F1, possibly F2.
Vryheid tornado	20 October 2006	KwaZulu-Natal	1	0	Rural huts destroyed on a farm 15 km east of the town. Child almost 'taken up' into tornado. Path estimated to be 4 km long. Estimated F1
Klerksdorp tornado	4 March 2007	North West	1	1 fatality, 3 injuries	F0 (South African Weather Bureah classified it as a "mini tornado"). 200 houses and other buildings damaged.
Molweni tornado	14 November 2008	KwaZulu-Natal	1	8 fatalities, 200 injuries	Crossed an urban area. Cars rolled some distance and shipping containers hurled through the air over 200m. Mud huts completely scoured away. Brick houses levelled. Path estimated to be 10 km long. Estimated EF3-4.
Bulwer tornado	6 November 2009	KwaZulu-Natal	1	1 fatality, 66 injuries	F3 according to Weather Service. Cars thrown and cinder brick homes flattened. 178 homes were destroyed.
Ficksburg tornado	3 October 2011	Free State	1	1 fatality, 42 injuries	F2 according to Weather Service. 122 houses and shacks destroyed.
Duduza tornado	3 October 2011	Gauteng	1	1 fatality, 166 injuries	F2 according to Weather Service. 150 houses destroyed
Bronkhorstspruit tornado	13 November 2011	Mpumalanga	1	0 fatalities, 0 injuries	Category unknown. Minimal damage due touching down in open fields.
Bethlehem tornado	23 June 2012	Free State	1	8 fatalities, 27 injuries	F2. Several houses was destroyed in Bethlehem and Kestell areas
Deneysville tornado	23 June 2012	Free State	1	1 fatality, 5 injuries	Caused widespread damage and destroyed a house in the Vaal Dam area.
Queenstown – Mthaha tornado	19 September 2013	Eastern Cape	1	-	
Tembisa	26 July 2016	Gauteng	1	0 fatalities, 3 injuries	Damaged roof of Phumulani Mall and a nearby hospital, causing injuries.
Mpumalanga, Standerton	10 December 2016	Mpumalanga, Standerton	1	0 fatalities	Spotted about 12 km outside Standerton on the R23 Volksrust Road
Mpumalanga Standerton	11 December 2016	Mpumalanga, Standerton	1	0 fatalities	Seen in the Kaalspruit/Bloukop Area
Vaal Marina	11 December 2016	Gauteng	1	0 fatalities, +-50 injuries	At least 300 people were displaced and 50 others injured
New Hanover	12 November 2019	KwaZulu-Natal	1	2 fatalities, +-18 injuries	Hundreds of people were displaced.
oThongathi	3 June 2024	KwaZulu-Natal	2	11 fatalities, > +-120 injuries	See article on storm complex — Hundreds of houses were damaged or destroyed. 11 deaths, including 7 in oThongathi, where an EF3 wedge tornado was confirmed. About 1500 were displaced. It later became a rare wedge waterspout.
Pretoria	18 February 2025	Gauteng	1	None	EF0 landspout tornado struck Montana in northern Pretoria. Displaced many after destroying residential complex.
Mpumalanga tornadoes	1 January 2026	Mpumalanga	2	None	A supercell produced two brief tornadoes, one NE of Middelburg and another near Carolina. The tornadoes produced damage but could not be surveyed due to property restrictions and limited time.

== Uganda ==
Event	Date	Area	Tornadoes	Casualties	Notes
Kalangala tornado	15 March 2025	Kalangala, Uganda	1	4 fatalities, 30+ injuries	A strong waterspout made landfall in Kalangala, damaging or destroying hundreds of structures across at least five villages, including a police station, homes, and businesses.

== See also ==
- List of tornadoes and tornado outbreaks
