= List of Taiwan tornadoes =

List of tornadoes in Taiwan

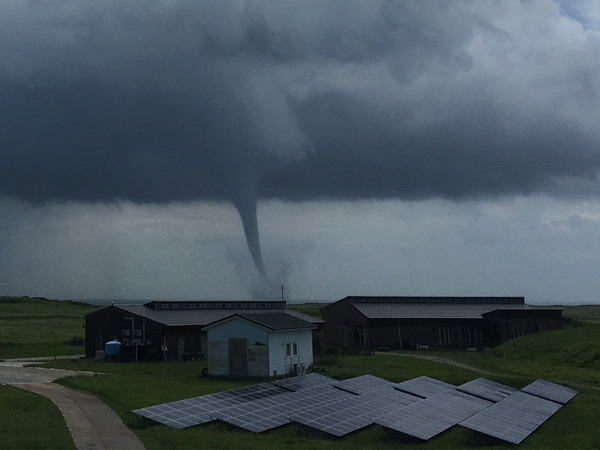
A waterspout seen from Dongjidao Weather Station in Penghu County

Tornadoes in Taiwan are rare with an average of 4 to 6 tornadoes annually. Most of these tornadoes are weak and short-lived with intensities that range between F0 and F1, although a very few tornadoes have reached F2 intensities. They occur less frequently compared to its neighboring countries such as China and Japan. Between 1998 and 2021, there are a total number of 156 documented tornadoes in the country. One of the earliest mentions of tornadoes that were documented in the country was in Anping, Tainan on June 3, 1877. However, the first tornado officially confirmed by the Central Weather Administration was in Tainan on April 18, 2007. Some tornadoes in the country originated as waterspouts before moving inland. Tornadoes in the country often occur during the summer monsoon months from April to October.

== Etymology ==
The word for 'tornado' in Taiwanese Hokkien is 卷螺仔风 (simplified) and 捲螺仔風 (traditional), which also refers to the word 'whirlwind.' It is a variation of the Mandarin Chinese word 龙卷风 (simplified) and 龍捲風 (traditional) which is lóng juǎn fēng in Pinyin, meaning "swirling-dragon wind," referring to the shape of a violently, rotating column of air.

== Climatology ==
A tornado is a powerful, rotating column of air that descends from the base of a thunderstorm onto the ground. It forms when warm, moist air collides with cold, dry air to create strong atmospheric instability, which then rotates due to vertical wind shear. Tornadoes often occur on intense thunderstorms or during tropical cyclones. Although tornadoes are short-lived, they can be destructive.

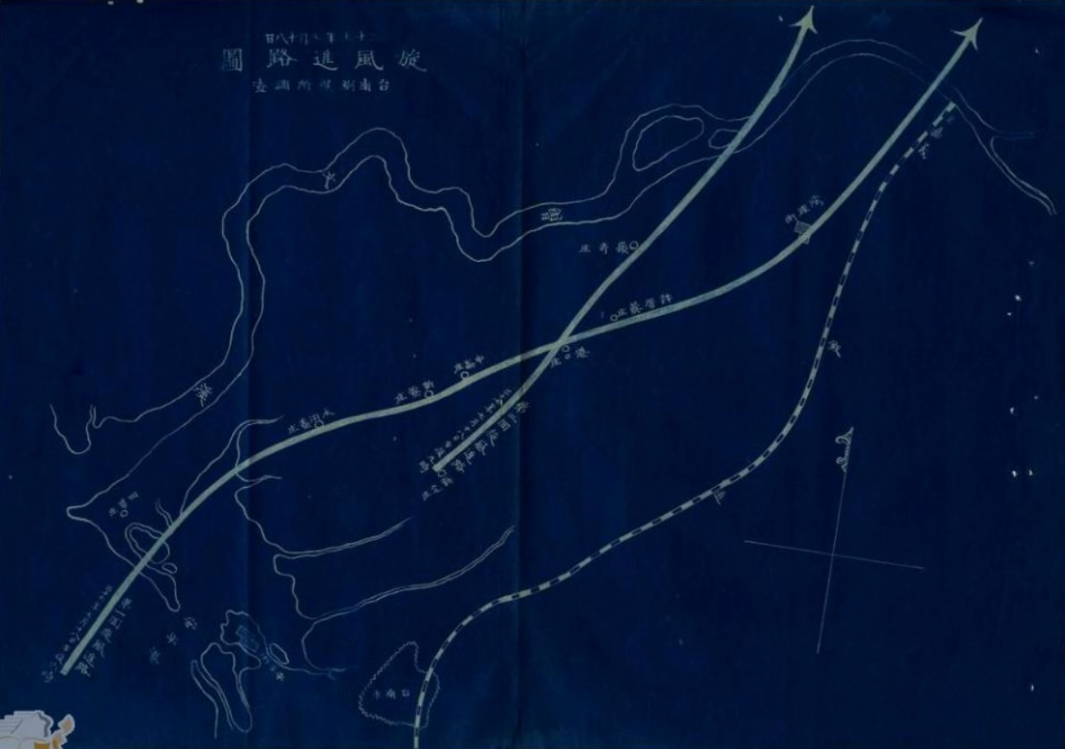
A map showing the path of tornadoes that hit Tainan on July 18, 1904

Taiwan has a humid subtropical climate in the north and a tropical monsoon climate in the south. During the rainy season or plum rain, the summer monsoon brings most of the accumulated annual rainfall in the country. It is also one of the most typhoon-prone areas in the world with an average of 3 to 4 typhoons hitting the country every year. One of the hazards of typhoons are tornadoes, which generally form on the right-front region of the storm system relative to its track. A notable example is a tornado in Tainan on August 9, 2015, where it formed on the outer bands of Typhoon Soudelor. While the probability of tornadoes hitting the country are rare, most of them occur in specific atmospheric environments. The geography of the country, particularly in the southern regions and the Chianan Plain are susceptible for tornadoes. Also known as the country's "tornado nest," areas such as Tainan, Kaohsiung, and Pingtung account for two-thirds of total documented tornadoes.

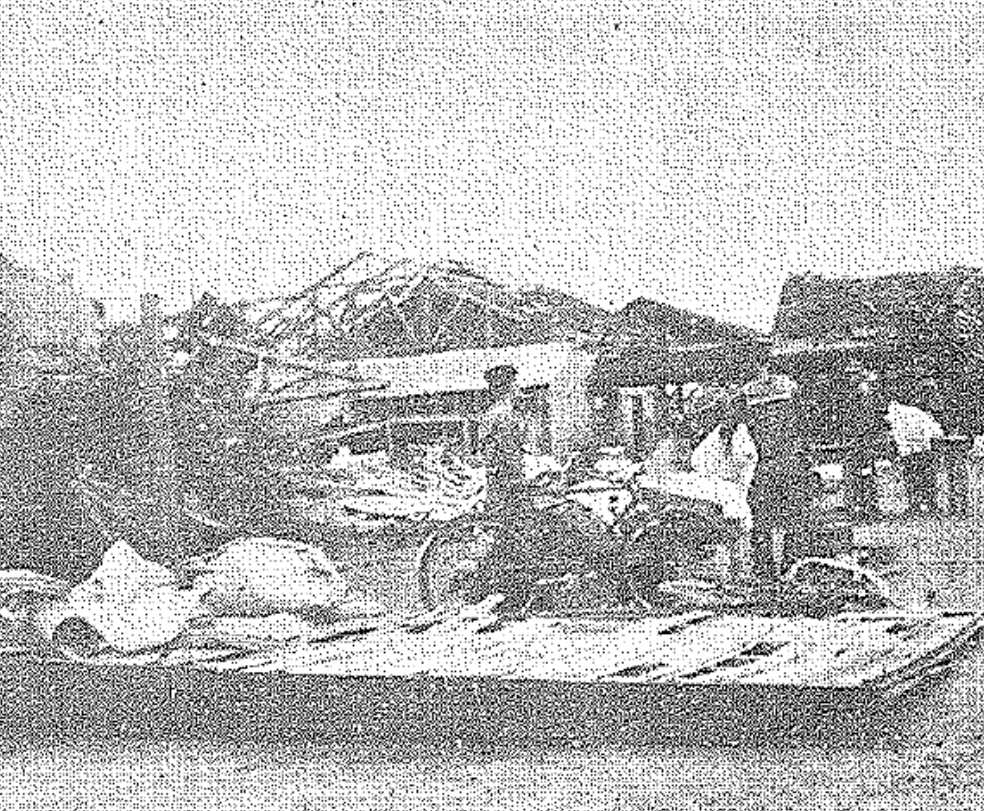
Tornado damage in Zouying Naval Base, Kaohsiung on May 14, 1951

There are three specific environments for tornadoes to form: convection cells that form thunderstorms, the development of cumulus clouds that create a vertical column of vortices, or during typhoons. These environments provide the necessary conditions for tornadoes to occur in the country. Because tornadoes happen on a small scale, it is difficult for the country's meteorological agency to analyze such events. Most historical records of tornadoes came from news reports or through damage assessments but the prevalence of internet usage led to an increase in tornado reports, primarily through social media.

There are some notable tornadoes in Taiwan. On May 12, 2011, a rare anti-cyclonic F1 tornado formed in Xindian District, New Taipei City. It was also the first tornado ever observed in the northern region. Meanwhile, on April 6, 2013, the country's first multi-vortex tornado hit Dashu District, Kaohsiung and Wandan, Pingtung and was given an F2 rating by the Central Weather Administration.

== Events ==
=== Pre-2000s ===
- June 3, 1877 – Roofs were torn off and trees were uprooted by what was described as a violent whirlwind that hit Tainan. A fisherman from Xishu village (modern-day South District, Tainan) was carried away to Alishan and presumably died before he was found alive more than ten days later.
- April 21, 1878 – Multiple structures in modern-day Zhongxi District, Tainan were hit by a whirlwind that destroyed several homes, government offices, and a temple. Local reports initially indicated more than a hundred deaths and a multiple number of unknown people injured. However, 'foreigners' tallied approximately 20 deaths. There were no records of official statistics in archives.
- July 18, 1904 – Two tornadoes hit Tainan after a typhoon struck the area where it resulted in more than 200 homes damaged, 80 people injured, and 5 others dead. The first tornado began in Anping District and travelled through several districts in the city where it destroyed almost 70 homes and damaged 20 others before it dissipated near Liujia District. Another tornado appeared hours later in Xinhua District and travelled roughly the same direction as the previous tornado before dissipating near the Zengwen River.
- May 14, 1951 – A series of tornadoes hit southern Taiwan that resulted in multiple structures destroyed and several casualties. At 17:10 TST, a tornado hit Zuoying Naval Base in Kaohsiung where it collapsed a warehouse and a school, which resulted in dozens of deaths and injuries. At 18:35 TST, another tornado hit Nanzih District, Kaohsiung where it started travelling through Wandan, Pingtung and Xinshi, Tainan before it dissipated in Majia, Pingtung. It damaged more than 30 homes and a school in Wandan where it killed a two-year-old child. At 19:30 TST, a tornado hit the Taiwan Sugar Research Institute in Tainan where it proceeded to damage the building and several sugarcane fields.
- June 5, 1993 – Around 49 homes were damaged and 5 people were injured by a tornado in Jiangjun District, Tainan.

=== 2000s ===
- June 11, 2003 – An F0 tornado toppled power lines and caused a power outage in Kaohsiung.
- August 25, 2004 – Several plantations and houses were damaged by an F0 tornado in Zhongpu, Chiayi County.
- April 18, 2007 – Several townships in Tainan County were hit by an F2 tornado where it damaged more than a hundred homes in the area. It stayed on the ground at about 40 minutes and formed a path at around 40 km (24.9 mi) long and 20 m (65.5 ft) wide before dissipating. It had the longest duration and the longest path in the country's recorded history.
- April 20, 2009 – A village in Baihe District, Tainan was hit by an F1 tornado where it destroyed at least 9 houses and damaged 20 others.

=== 2010s ===
- May 12, 2011 – A car park in Xindian District, New Taipei City was hit by a rare anti-cyclonic F1 tornado where it flipped a few motor vehicles and overturned an SUV.
- August 1, 2011 – More than 40 homes were damaged by a tornado that hit districts in Tainan.
- September 16, 2012 – A total of five homes and large areas of a farmland were destroyed by a tornado in the Meinong District, Kaohsiung.
- April 6, 2013 – A rare multi-vortex F2 tornado damaged 28 homes and several hectares of farmland in Dashu District, Kaohsiung and Wandan, Pingtung. It lasted for about 10 minutes and travelled for approximately 8 km (5 mi) before dissipating. The tornado also injured 2 people in the area.
- July 19, 2014 – A tornado that originated as a waterspout in the Gaoping River damaged 10 homes as it travelled for 6 km (3.72 mi) in Ligang, Pingtung County.
- August 9, 2015 – Multiple debris were scattered, cars were swept, and a white minivan was picked up by a tornado along a road in Tainan during Typhoon Soudelor. One person was reported injured from the tornado.
- July 1, 2019 – Two townships in Pingtung County were hit by a tornado which resulted in more than a hundred homes damaged and five cars destroyed. In Linbian Township, two people were injured after being hit by flying debris.
- July 10, 2019 – A power outage occurred on Taiwan Railways Administration's western line in Changhua County after a tornado hit a bamboo grove which struck a power line between Tianzhong railway station and Ershui railway station.

=== 2020s ===
- July 1, 2025 – A landspout was seen travelling in Guanshan, Taitung and lasted for about 10 minutes before dissipating.
- July 11, 2025 – Two tornadoes appeared in southern Taiwan. A tornado was spotted in Wandan, Pingtung while at the same time, another tornado formed in Daliao District, Kaohsiung. Both tornadoes have no reported damages.
- July 19, 2025 – Five homes were damaged by a tornado in Daren, Taitung that was formed by Tropical Storm Wipha.
- September 23, 2025 – Months after a tornado hit in Daren, Taitung, another tornado that was formed during Typhoon Ragasa hit the township where it damaged 10 homes, scattered debris, and blew over road signs.
- October 14, 2025 – At around 13:00 TST, an F0 tornado formed in Meinong District, Kaohsiung. No damages were reported.
- August 8, 2026 – A tornado formed from the outer rainbands of Typhoon Dolphin was spotted in Tamsui District, New Taipei City. No injuries or major damages were reported.

== See also ==
- List of Asian tornadoes and tornado outbreaks
- Anti-cyclonic tornado
- Typhoons in Taiwan
