= List of Rhode Island tornadoes =

This is a list of all tornadoes reported in the US state of Rhode Island. Although tornadoes are very rare in this state, around 20 have been recorded in modern history. Additionally, because of high population density and property values, Rhode Island ranks 5th among states in potential losses due to tornadoes.

== Tornadoes ==
- August 15, 1787: A part of the Four-State Tornado Swarm of 1787, a tornado moved into the state from Windham County, Connecticut and tore the roofs from some homes in Glocester before passing into Massachusetts.
- August 30, 1838: A major tornado, possibly the worst in Rhode Island history, passed south of Providence. It uprooted and stripped trees of their branches, unroofed or destroyed many houses, and sucked water out of ponds. The tornado barely missed a local railroad depot, where many people were waiting for a train. Five people were injured by the tornado. After exiting Rhode Island, it continued east into Massachusetts before dissipating in Bristol County, near the border with Plymouth County.
- August 25, 1882: A tornado damaged two barns and destroyed many trees in Johnston.
- September 14, 1972: A weak F0 tornado hit east of Newport.
- August 26, 1985: An F1 tornado passed from Connecticut into rural North Foster, causing no reported damage to structures.
- August 7, 1986: The first multiple-tornado day recorded in Rhode Island history. A weak F1 tornado briefly touched down near Lincoln around 3:30 PM local time. At approximately 4:30pm an F2 tornado destroyed a home at 43 Hillwood St, Providence owned by Lynn Panchuk Price. It stayed on the ground for 4 miles (6 km), injuring 20 people and causing around $2.5 million in damage.
- August 8, 1986: Another tornado struck the state again on this day. Touching down at the unusual time of 9:30 AM north of Bridgeton, it continued on the ground for more than 6 miles (9 km) before passing into Massachusetts near North Smithfield. Three people were injured by this F1 tornado.
- September 23, 1989: An F0 tornado caused minor damage in Cranston.
- October 18, 1990: An F1 touched down in Warwick, crossed Narragansett Bay as a waterspout, and dissipated in Riverside.
- August 13, 1994: A small tornado damaged trees along a one-mile path in Coventry.
- August 16, 2000: A very minor F0 tornado damaged a few trees along a 50-foot path in Foster.
- July 23, 2008: A waterspout moved onshore as a low-end EF1 tornado in Warren, moving east-northeast into Massachusetts.
- August 10, 2012: A waterspout moved onshore on the southern end of Block Island, moving north across the whole length of the island. Minor EF0 damage to trees and homes were reported.
- October 23, 2018: An EF1 tornado struck Lincoln around 3:30 local time, causing damage to trees and homes, an EF0 tornado struck neighboring North Providence causing damage to mostly trees. Other waterspouts were reported across the state, though they did not cause any reported damage. No injuries were reported. This small outbreak continued across New England with tornadoes reported in Norton and other Massachusetts towns.
- October 2, 2019: An EF0 tornado hit Portsmouth and lasted for 2 minutes. It caused damage to a few trees and a garage.
- November 13, 2021: Two EF0 tornadoes and one EF1 struck the state. This was the first multiple tornado outbreak since 1986 and the first recorded tornado occurrence in the state in the month of November. The first touched down in North Stonington, CT, and crossed over into Westerly at approximately 5 p.m. with 90mph winds. The second struck North Kingstown with 80mph winds. The third touched down in Plainfield, CT, and crossed over into Foster at approximately 5:02 p.m. with 80mph winds.
- August 18, 2023: An EF2 tornado touched down in Scituate, uprooting and snapping trees, tearing apart powerlines, and ripping part of a roof off a house. It moved along on a discontinuous path into Johnston at EF1 strength, crossing Interstate 295 where it briefly lifted a car into the air, injuring the driver. It also impacted parts of North Providence, also at EF1 strength. This tornado lifted off the ground and touched back down several times during its lifespan. This tornado was also the strongest reported tornado in Rhode Island since the Cranston tornado of August 7, 1986.
- September 13, 2023: Three tornadoes touched down in the northern part of Rhode Island, caused by a singular severe thunderstorm. The first tornado began in Killingly, Connecticut, and crossed the state line into Rhode Island, near Foster, where it dissipated shortly after crossing into Rhode Island. Another tornado touched down in Glocester, where it uprooted or snapped dozens of trees. A bus stop was blown away and debris was strewn west of the tornado's path. The final tornado touched down just east of the North Central State Airport in Smithfield. It continued into the town of Lincoln. A large tree was uprooted and a roof suffered significant damage. The tornado then crossed into a solar panel field, lifting afterwards. All three tornadoes received an EF1 rating with estimated maximum wind speeds of 90 to 100 mph.
- June 26, 2024: An EF1 tornado touched down in Lincoln. It continued through Cumberland, causing damage in Mendon Road and Meadowcrest Drive, and then dissipated in North Attleborough.

== See also ==
- Enhanced Fujita Scale
- Fujita scale
- List of tornadoes and tornado outbreaks
