= 1878 Wallingford tornado =

Tornado in Connecticut

Coordinates: 41.4637°N 72.8268°W

Wallingford Tornado
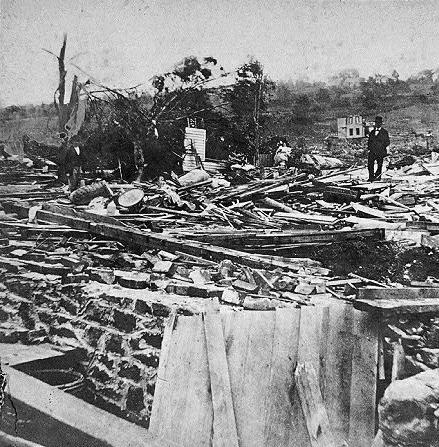
- Picture of a destroyed house in Wallingford

Meteorological history
- Formed: August 9, 1878 6:15 p.m. EST

F4 tornado
- on the Fujita scale

Overall effects
- Casualties: ~34 fatalities, 70+ injuries
- Damage: ~$5.3 million (2007 USD)
- Areas affected: Southern Connecticut

The Wallingford tornado was a violent tornado that struck the town of Wallingford, Connecticut, on Friday, August 9, 1878. The tornado, unofficially rated F4 by tornado expert Thomas P. Grazulis, destroyed most of the town, killing about 34 people—estimated totals varied—and injuring at least 70, many severely. This was the deadliest tornado ever to strike the state of Connecticut, and the second deadliest ever in New England, after the Worcester tornado of 1953.

== Before the storm ==
The storm system that eventually spawned the Wallingford tornado produced damaging winds and at least one tornado far before it reached the town. The first tornado from this storm system touched down in South Kent, unroofing houses, blowing down barns, and uprooting and tossing trees into the air. It moved steadily southeast for 12 mi (19 km), moving just south of New Preston, and then through Washington, before turning north and dissipating. The next path of damage started further north along the Shepaug River. It is unknown whether this was a tornado or straight-line winds, but the damage path continued southeast for three miles before disappearing again. More damage was reported near Waterbury, where a house was unroofed two miles west of the town. In the town itself, branches and chimneys were damaged.

As the storm approached Wallingford, observers described a black, rolling funnel, with clouds blowing in from all directions. This system passed directly over Cheshire, producing a strong wind at the surface which caused some minor damage. The storm then moved directly towards Wallingford.

== The Wallingford tornado ==
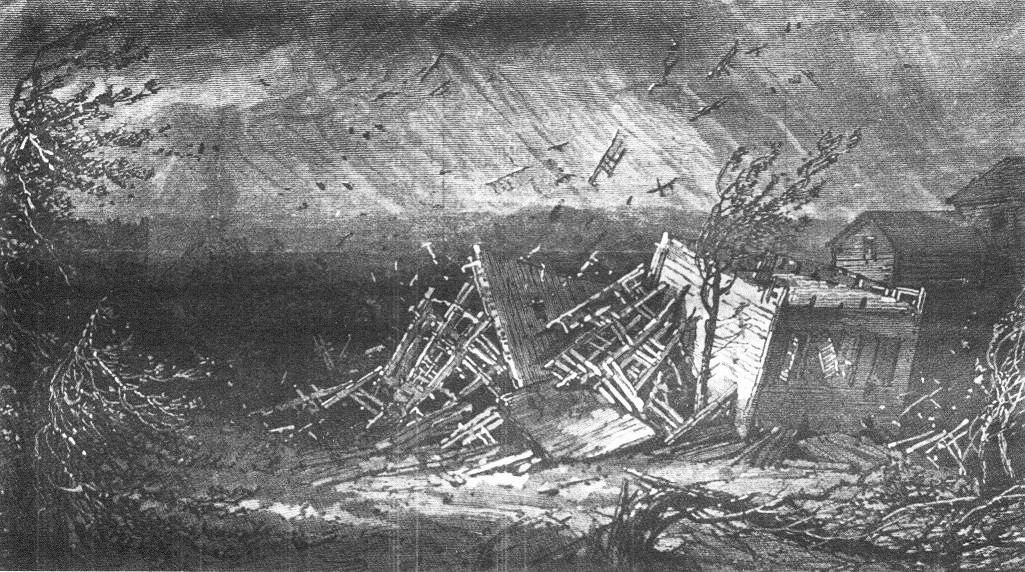
Artist's conception of the tornado destroying a house

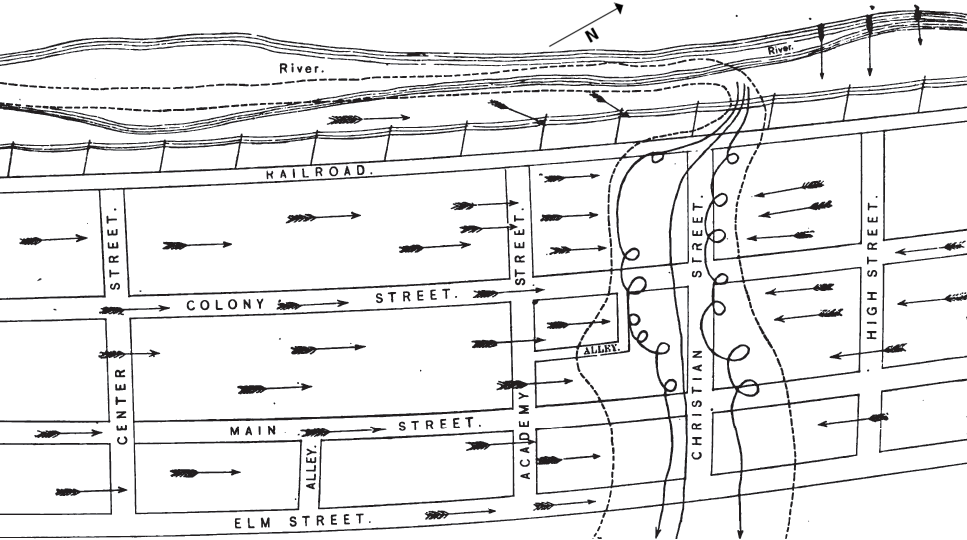
Map of the tornado's path through the town

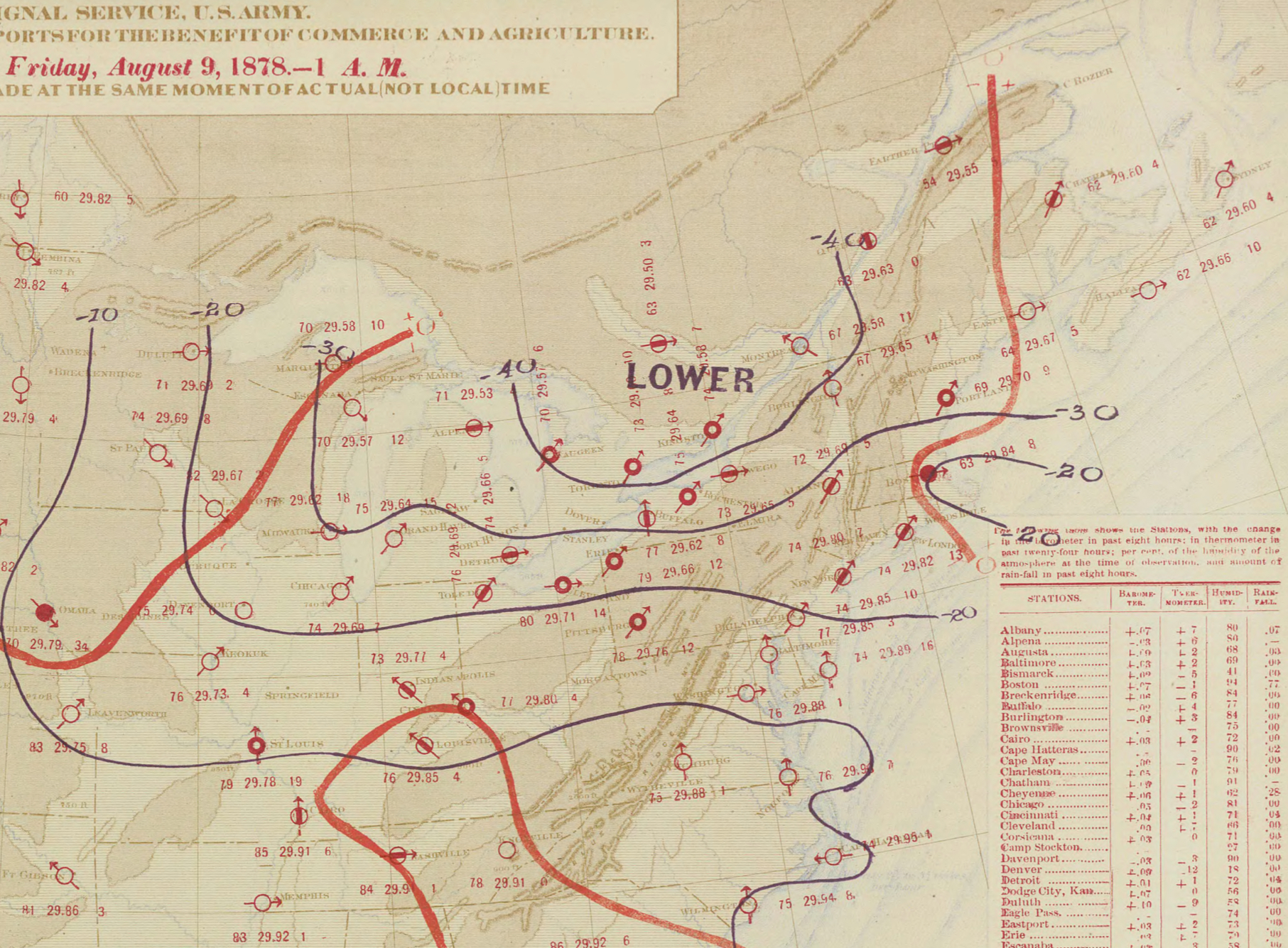
Weather map of the storm complex that would produce the tornado in Wallingford, Connecticut on August 9

In Wallingford, the day prior to the tornado was clear, and said to be "one of the loveliest [days] of the season". At around 5 p.m. the sky began to get dark, and by 5:30 p.m. the air was very black. At around 6 p.m., the air at the surface was calm, but lightning began to fill the sky, and the clouds began moving at a very rapid pace, frightening some residents into shelter.

The tornado started at 6:15 p.m. local time as a waterspout over Community Lake, just west of town. It then moved through the center of town along Christian Street, damaging almost every structure as it went. The tornado tore houses from their foundations, throwing some more than 600 feet (180 meters). A receipt from the town was later found 65 miles (105 km) east in Peacedale, Rhode Island. Large trees were uprooted and snapped, and those that were still standing were stripped of small limbs and leaves. The Catholic Church was blown to bits, and heavy tombstones in the nearby cemetery were tossed around. The brand-new brick high school building was almost completely destroyed. The tornado's path through town was only two miles long, but the damage path was up to 600 feet (180 meters) wide.

More tornadic damage was reported in southern Durham and Killingworth, with some homes severely damaged, but there were some minor injuries, one young woman in Killingworth was injured by shards of glass from a breaking window. Some sources insist that the Wallingford tornado dissipated a few miles west of the town, and this was an entirely separate tornado, but without a modern damage survey it is impossible to tell. The parent storm finally moved out over the ocean around 8 PM.

== Aftermath ==
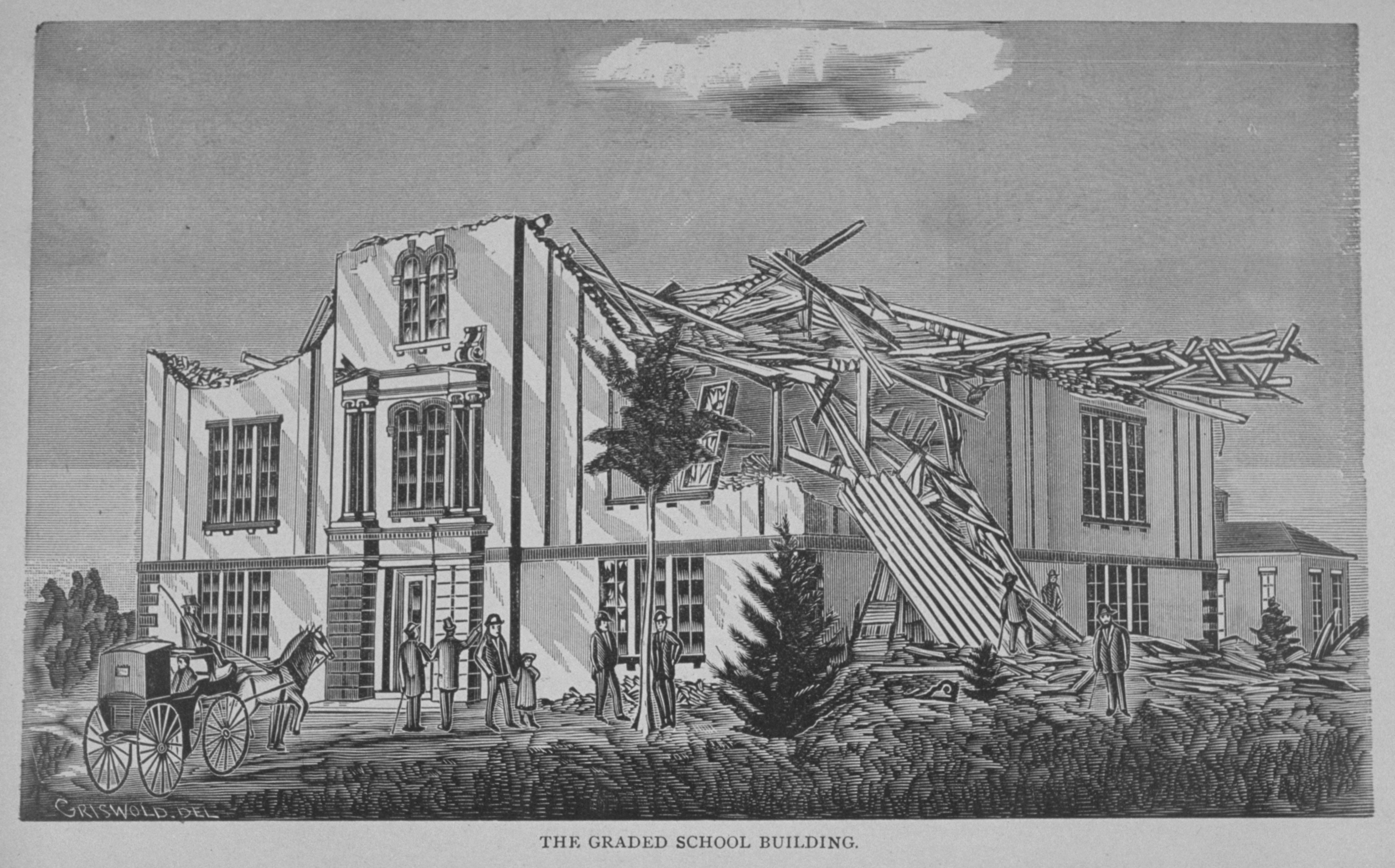
Artist's drawing of damage to the grade school

A district schoolhouse was converted into a temporary morgue immediately after the storm; 21 bodies were discovered and placed there that night. One person was found dead 3,300 feet (1.0 km) from where he had been standing. The tornado brought down telegraph lines and poles around the area, so assistance from physicians in nearby towns took more than an hour. More than 50 special police were sworn in to prevent looting, and to control the crowds of curious onlookers who had come by train from surrounding cities.

Thirty five homes were completely destroyed, with many more being unroofed or receiving some sort of damage. Damage estimates were around $150,000 from buildings alone; utilities and railway facilities received a lot of damage as well. Final estimates were around $250,000 ($5.3 million when adjusted for inflation).

Tornadoes are not very uncommon in the state of Connecticut, but tornadoes of this power are rare. Though tornadoes have only been officially rated on the Fujita scale since 1950, this tornado has been estimated to be of F4-intensity on the scale. This would make it one of only three tornadoes of this intensity to ever affect the state, as of 2008. Thirty-four people were killed by the tornado—thirty-one more than the second-deadliest Connecticut tornado—and 70 others injured.

The tornado also devastated a branch of the Oneida Community that had operated in Wallingford from 1851 through 1878. The subsidiary community closed down and the members consolidated with the main community.

== See also ==
- List of North American tornadoes and tornado outbreaks
- List of Connecticut tornadoes
