= Four-State Tornado Swarm =

Earliest recorded tornado outbreak in the United States

Meteorological history
- Date: August 15, 1787

Tornado outbreak
- Tornadoes: ≥5
- Max. rating: Unrated tornado
- Duration: 3.5+ hours

Overall effects
- Casualties: 2 fatalities, ≥15 injuries
- Damage: Unknown
- Areas affected: New England

The Four-State Tornado Swarm was a destructive outbreak of tornadoes in New England on August 15, 1787. At least five separate tornadoes caused major damage in the states of Connecticut, Rhode Island, Massachusetts, and New Hampshire. Two people were killed by a tornado in Wethersfield, Connecticut, and many were injured throughout New England. This event is considered to be the first true tornado outbreak on record.

== Synopsis ==
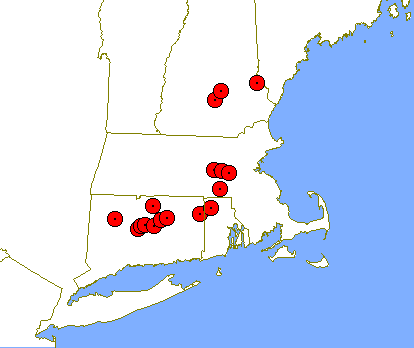
A map of towns which reported damage. Not all of these damage areas were definitely tornadic, and some tornadoes hit more than one town.

The first storm damage occurred in Litchfield, Connecticut, where a strong northwest wind and hail stones weighing more than 1 ounce (28 g) damaged crops and broke windows. Four men were struck by lightning, but survived.

The first tornado touched down near New Britain, Connecticut, between 1 p.m. and 2 p.m., moving east-northeast. A barn roof was blown 2 miles (3.2 km) away. The tornado then passed through Newington on its way to Wethersfield. The tornado there was described as "[whirling] with amazing velocity and a most tremendous roar." It passed through a mostly-uninhabited part of the town; if the path were more than 0.5 miles (0.8 km) further north or south, the tornado "would have been fatal to a large number of families." The tornado traveled slightly north of east, and struck just one home. The inhabitants fled the house upon the sight of the tornado: two young boys, a laborer, and a mother and baby were overtaken by the tornado in a nearby field. The two boys were found amid some rubble, one dead and one was "feared mortally wounded." The mother was killed as well, but the baby who was in her arms survived with only minor injuries. The laborer was thrown over a fence but only slightly injured. Their house was unroofed, and several outbuildings were "leveled with the ground". Clothes from the house were found three miles away, and trees and boards were carried 0.5 miles (0.8 km) or more.

The tornado continued east-northeast from Wethersfield, leveling almost all trees in its path, until it reached Glastonbury. There it damaged several homes and barns, including an unroofing of a large brick home, but only injured two people slightly. The damage continued into at least Bolton and Coventry, where more damage was done, but any specific damage done or human casualties are unknown.

The second tornado was spotted west of East Windsor. It moved northeast away from the center of town, but did damage to a home and a barn. Trees 2.5 feet (0.76 m) in diameter were twisted down, and even sod and stones "of a considerable size" were torn up. No injuries were reported, however.

The third tornado of the outbreak was a long-tracked tornado, first spotted in Killingly, Connecticut. It moved northeast into Rhode Island to near Glocester. Orchards were destroyed there, and a house and barn were "torn to pieces" while the family took shelter in the cellar. Several other homes were unroofed, and a woman was carried some distance, but only suffered minor injuries. The tornado continued northeast into Massachusetts as far as Mendon, 20 miles (32 km) from where it touched down.

The fourth known tornado was first spotted near Northborough, Massachusetts. The tornado caused more severe damage along the border between Marlborough and Southborough. In Marlborough, a barn was thrown from its foundation. A house's roof was destroyed, with pieces scattered 0.75 miles (1.2 km) away. In Southborough and Framingham, many structures were damaged. A house in Framingham was destroyed while two women were inside, but they suffered only bruises. The tornado dissipated east of Framingham. Many crops were destroyed by winds and floods.

Observers reported seeing pieces of buildings, furniture, and trees thrown about in the air. Severe tree damage was reported all along the tornado's path. Along the tornado's route, the damage was not more than 40 rods (660 ft; 200 m) wide, and in some places was much narrower, though the damage was greatest in these areas.

The final tornado of the day occurred much further north in the town of Rochester, New Hampshire. A house was lifted from its foundation with eight people inside, but only two were injured. Pieces of the house were found 3 miles (4.8 km) distant. A barn was "taken and entirely carried off" by the tornado, and was not found. Trees, fences, and crops were leveled along the tornado's path, which was around 20 rods (330 ft; 100 m) wide. Considerable damage also occurred in Dunbarton, New Hampshire and Concord, New Hampshire, but it is not known if this was not directly connected to the tornado.

== List of known tornadoes ==
List of confirmed tornadoes — August 15, 1787
F#	Location	County	Time (UTC)	Path length	Damage
Connecticut
F?	New Britain to Coventry	Hartford, Tolland	1330	≥5 miles (8.0 km)	2 deaths - 10 additional injured. Affected New Britain, Newington, Wethersfield, Glastonbury, Bolton, and Coventry.
F?	Killingly to Mendon, MA	Windham, Providence (RI), Worcester (MA)	1700	20 miles (32 km)	One person was injured. Affected the towns of Killingly, Glocester, Rhode Island, and Mendon, Massachusetts.
F?	NE of East Windsor	Hartford	unknown	5 miles (8.0 km)	East Windsor was affected.
Massachusetts
F?	Northborough to Framingham	Worcester, Middlesex	unknown	8 miles (13 km)	Two people were injured. Affected the towns of Northborough, Southborough, and Framingham.
New Hampshire
F?	Rochester area	Strafford	unknown	unknown	Two people were injured. Rochester was affected by this tornado.
Sources: Grazulis, pg. 553; Ludlam pgs. 12-16

== Historical perspective ==
This day was the most extensive tornado event on record at the time, and was the most severe tornado outbreak in early New England history, on par only with the September 1821 New England tornado outbreak. Very few buildings were struck by the tornadoes (though the tornadoes passed close to many highly populated towns) which accounts for the low death toll. However, the destructive potential was high, as indicated by the incredible tree damage in places.

A document was published in the Connecticut Courant (now the Hartford Courant) a few days later, detailing the appearance of "a black column from the earth to the cloud" near Wethersfield. This was the most complete description of a tornado on record until the 1830s.

== See also ==
- List of North American tornadoes and tornado outbreaks
- List of Connecticut tornadoes
- List of Rhode Island tornadoes
- Tornadoes in New England
