= Remarkable Providences =

1684 essay by Increase Mather

Remarkable Providences is an essay by Increase Mather, first published in 1684 under the title An Essay for the Recording of Illustrious Providences. The work was produced by Harvard College. It is a record of reports on witchcraft, supposed Satanism, sea-deliverances, accidents, apparitions, and unaccountable phenomena in general. The work also contains elements anticipating the Spiritualist movement, with reports of rappings, tippings, trances, and second sight.

The work is thought to have influenced Cotton Mather, the writer's son, in his involvement with witch trials in colonial New England.

== Background ==
In 1681, when the agitation in the Massachusetts Bay Colony over the questions respecting the imperilled colonial charter was rapidly approaching a climax, and the public mind was already feverishly excited, the ministers sent out a paper of proposals for collecting facts concerning witchcraft.

== Synopsis ==
This resulted three years later (1684) in the production of a work by President Increase Mather of Harvard College, which was originally entitled An Essay for the Recording of Illustrious Providences. Into this book President Mather had gathered up all that was known or could be collected concerning the performances of persons supposed to be leagued with the Devil. The book also contains a remarkable of sea-deliverances, accidents, apparitions, and unaccountable phenomena in general; in addition to the things more strictly pertaining to witchcraft.

== Legacy ==
Palfrey the historian believes that this book had an unfortunate effect upon the mind and imagination of President Mather's son, the Reverend Cotton Mather; and that it led him into investigations and publications supposed to have had an important effect in producing the disastrous delusion which followed three years later.

Helen Rex Keller writes, "It is rather remarkable to learn from this work that modern spiritualistic performances—rappings, tippings, trances, second sight, and the like—were well known to the grave fathers of New England, although they unfortunately looked upon them as far more serious matters than do their descendants to-day."

== See also ==
- New Castle, New Hampshire

== Sources ==
- Mather, Increase (1689). Memorable Providences, Relating to Witchcrafts and Possessions (New ed.). Boston, New England: R.P., sold by Joseph Brunning.
- Hart, J.; Leininger, P. (1995). "Remarkable Providences". The Oxford Companion to American Literature. Oxford University Press. ISBN 978-0-19-506548-0.

Attribution:

- Keller, Helen Rex (1917). "Remarkable Providences". The Reader's Digest of Books. The Library of the World's Best Literature. New York, NY: The Macmillan Company. pp. 722–723.
