= September 1821 New England tornado outbreak =

Tornado outbreak affecting New England

Meteorological history
- Formed: September 9, 1821

Tornado outbreak
- Max. rating: F4 tornado
- Duration: 6 known

Overall effects
- Fatalities: 8 known

The 1821 New England tornado outbreak was a tornado outbreak that affected the New England states during September 1821. Six destructive tornadoes can be verified from the event.

The first known tornado of the outbreak touched down L'Assomption, Quebec causing minor damage to homes early in the afternoon. Storms then tracked southeast into New England. One supercell caused a weak tornado in Berlin, before producing an F2 tornado in Haverhill. Another cell produced a weak tornado Pittsford, before producing a violent, long track tornado, over south Vermont. The third and final cell produced a violent tornado in Franklin County, Massachusetts.

== Meteorological synopsis ==
September 1821 was noted to be very stormy across the East Coast, including a violent storm on the 3rd that caused loss of life and property. The day before, the 8th, before was noted to be quite warm. On Sunday the 9th, winds were southwesterly, likely due to a low forming to the north, for much of the afternoon, which likely aided in warm air advection. The air was reported to be warm, humid, with the sun was shining brightly. Before 5 P.M., a storm formed over Lake Champlain, on the border between Vermont and New York, and underwent a cell split, sending one supercell on a more eastward track through New Hampshire, and one supercell on a more southeastward track towards Massachusetts. The southern cell, like the northern cell, struggled to produce a tornado until crossing the Connecticut River. The northern cell started to produce a separate violent tornado by Cornish, while the southern cell began producing 40 miles south by Northfield.

== Known tornadoes ==
List of confirmed tornadoes — September 9, 1821
F#	Location	County/RCM	Time (UTC)	Path length	Damage
Massachusetts
F4	Northfield, Warwick, Orange	Franklin	2300	>10 miles (16 km)	2 deaths - See section on this tornado - Buildings were completely destroyed in Northfield, Warwick, and North Orange. 30 additional people were injured.
New Hampshire
F1	Haverhill	Grafton	0000	7 miles (11 km)	This storm touched down just south of Haverhill, passed through part of East Haverhill, and destroyed more than 100 acres (40 ha) of forest. A path was said to have been visible for years after the event. A barn was destroyed as well.
F4	Cornish/Croydon areas	Sullivan, Merrimack	0045	>23 miles (37 km)	6 deaths - See article on this tornado - This tornado, with a path up to 0.5 miles (0.8 km) in width, may have begun in Vermont. There was damage early near Cornish and Croydon as several buildings were destroyed to the ground, and the funnel revealed a multiple-vortex structure as it crossed Lake Sunapee and Mt. Kearsarge. Furniture from a destroyed home was carried for two miles across the lake. Many homes and barns were destroyed in New London, and all 7 homes were completely destroyed in the small settlement of Kearsarge Grove near Warner. This is the deadliest tornado ever recorded in New Hampshire.
Vermont
F0	Berlin	Washington	unknown	unknown	Tree damage near Berlin.
F2	Pittsford	Rutland	unknown	unknown	Possibly related to the above New Hampshire tornado. Buildings in Pittsford and Hubbardton were destroyed. A book was carried for six miles.
Quebec
F0	L'Assomption	L'Assomption	1900	6.5 miles	Three homes were damaged and some crops and trees were scattered. 2 injuries.
Sources:, Grazulis (1977)

=== Franklin County ===
1821 Franklin County, Massachusetts, tornado
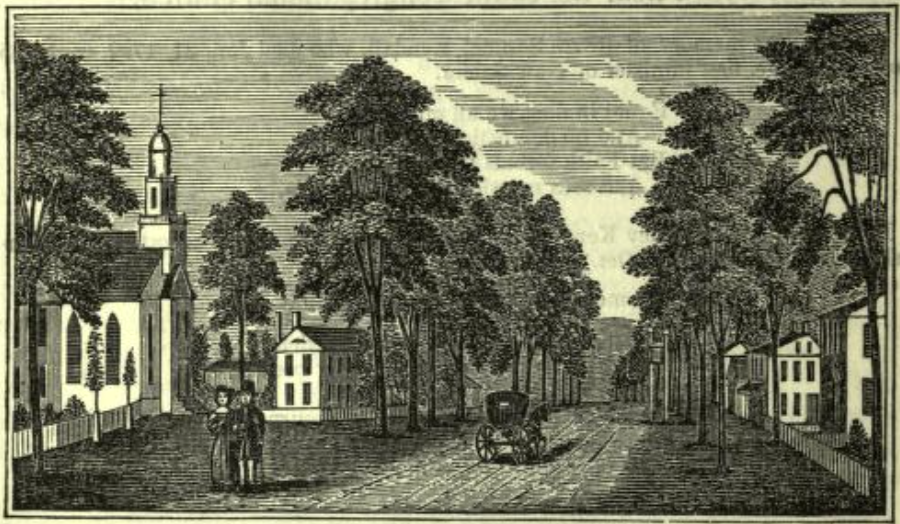
- Northfield in 1844

Meteorological history
- Formed: September 9, 1821, 5:45 p.m. EST (UTC–05:00)

F4 tornado
- on the Fujita scale
- Max width: 660 yards (0.38 mi; 0.60 km)
- Path length: 11.25 miles (18.11 km)

Overall effects
- Fatalities: 2
- Injuries: 30
- Damage: $10,000 (1821 USD)
- Areas affected: Franklin County

On September 9, 1821, a large and violent tornado tracked through Franklin County, Massachusetts, causing extensive damage to the towns of Northfield, Warwick, and North Orange. The tornado caused 2 fatalities and 30 injuries.

At approximately 22:45 UTC. the tornado began in the Northfield Mountains moving about east-southeastwardly. The tornado was noted to be very erratic in direction, and size, ranging from 110 to 660 yards in width. It hurled trees, buildings, fences, and stone walls like feathers in the air. Trees were stripped of their branches and hurled a considerable distance. Large stones weighing hundreds of pounds were thrown, and deep trenches up to 6 feet deep were found in many places.

In Northfield, the tornado passed about one mile south of downtown. Two sets of dwelling houses and barns, one belonging to a Mr. Garland and the other Chapin Holden, were completely destroyed. Mr. Garland's wife was carried 100 yards but survived with injuries. Mr. Garling and Holden also sustained injuries. A barn belonging to Reuben Wright was fully lofted and carried 10 yards before being smashed to the ground.

In Warwick, two barns, owned by Jonas Leonard Mr. Elijah Miller, were destroyed. A house, barn out-building, belonging to Jonathan Wilson were swept away, having been "shivered to atoms in an instant." Four boys, Wilson, and his wife were injured in the house. After, it passed over a large pond, where it picked up a large amount of water, briefly becoming a tornadic waterspout. Elisha Brown's house was severely damaged, inside which he, his wife, and their nine children were sheltering. Most were injured, and their thirteen-year-old daughter was killed. Following the destruction at the Brown property, two barns, belonging to David Gale and John Bell were destroyed. Large logs that had sit in a nearby brook for decades were lifted and rolled.

In Orange, the tornado did its most violent damage as it passed to the north of downtown, near modern-day North Orange. Barns, a blacksmith shop, and a tavern-house, all belonging to Moses Smith, were swept from their foundations. So severe was the destruction that foundation stones and chimney were thrown in the air while the cellar walls were damaged. At this location, 10 were injured, and 20-year-old Ms. Stearns was killed. A horse was carried 220 yards and killed. So great was the destruction, that "scarcely an article of furniture was saved, being either broken or carried away." Two barns, belonging to Ebenezer Chenery and Zina Goodell were destroyed on the east side of Orange. The tornado lifted before Tully Mountain, with a total length of 11 miles.

Beyond Orange, trees, fences, grain, and hay were deposited after being ripped up from the previous three towns. Debris was carried up to 25 miles to the towns of Royalston, Winchendon, Ashburnham, and Fitchburg. Damages were estimated at $10,000 (1821 USD). The day after, the residents of Warwick voted to raise $400 (1821 USD) to distribute to those who suffered losses.

== See also ==
- List of North American tornadoes and tornado outbreaks
