= List of Connecticut tornadoes =

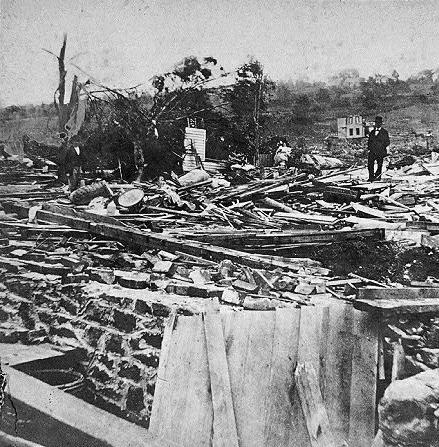
Picture of a house destroyed by the Wallingford Tornado of 1878

Although historically the U.S. state of Connecticut is not typically known to fall casualty to tornadoes, more than 100 of these powerful storms have affected the state in modern history, resulting in at least 48 deaths, 780 injuries, and more than $500 million in damage. This list of tornadoes in the state is likely incomplete, as official records date back only to 1950 for tornadoes in the United States.

As with most of the northeastern United States, the number of tornadoes peaks in the summer months, normally in July or August. Hartford County has had the most tornadoes in the state, although since 1950 Litchfield County has reported the most tornadoes. Several areas have been struck more than once, and Waterbury has been struck by no less than four tornadoes since 1955.

From 1953 to 1991, Connecticut recorded an average of about 1.3 tornadoes per year, ranked 43rd in the United States. Although Connecticut tornadoes are typically weak, isolated events can be violent. Three tornadoes of F4 intensity have affected the state in its history, as well as at least 27 tornadoes of F2 intensity or greater. Outbreaks of three or more tornadoes in a single day occurred in 1786, 1787, 1878, 1973, 1989, 1998, 2001, 2018, 2020, and 2021. The year 1973 was particularly active; eight tornadoes occurred on six separate days. The year 2018 has the highest number of tornadoes recorded in the state in a year, with nine total. The 1878 Wallingford tornado killed at least 29 and likely 34 people in Wallingford, the most by any tornado event in Connecticut history.

== Before 1850 ==
- June 14, 1648: A "great tempest" downed trees somewhere in present-day Hartford County.
- June 20, 1682: A violent storm, including one or more likely tornadoes, devastated forests in southern Connecticut, affecting areas north of Fairfield across the Housatonic River before passing out into Long Island Sound between Milford and New Haven. The damage was worst around present-day Shelton, where a path was cut a half-mile wide where there was "scarce a tree left standing".
- 1728 or 1729: A possible tornado passed through New Britain and/or Wethersfield.
- August 17, 1784: Two tornadoes struck central Connecticut. The first tornado touched down near present-day Roxbury, then known as "Shipague-Neck". It travelled through the village of South Britain, injuring five people, with one man injured so that "his life was in great danger". Ten houses, five barns, and three mills were badly damaged or destroyed. The second tornado injured one person while moving down a hillside west of Southington.
- August 23, 1786: As many as six tornadoes did a great deal of damage in Windham County. Twenty homes and sixty-three barns were destroyed, as well as 1,000 acres (4.0 km^{2}) of dense forest. One woman was killed and five people were injured in Woodstock. Leaves from destroyed trees rained down heavily in Providence, Rhode Island.
- August 15, 1787: The Four-State Tornado Swarm of 1787 was the largest tornado outbreak recorded to date, and affected most of New England. The first in the state touched down around 1:30 PM near New Britain, traveling along nearly the same path as a tornado in 1728 or 1729. This tornado was nearly as violent as the Wallingford Tornado of 1878. A mother and two of her children were killed in Wethersfield, and 10 others were injured before the tornado lifted outside of the town. What may have been another tornado caused additional damage as far east as Coventry. Another tornado struck East Windsor, damaging several homes and barns. Yet another touched down near Killingly, moving northeast into Rhode Island and Massachusetts.
- June 19, 1794: A tornado destroyed several structures in Milford injuring four people, while a separate tornado cut through Branford. A strange incident was recorded where a tree was uprooted and carried, fully upright, along a road in New Milford, along with several other large objects. A barn door was found 10 miles (16 km) from its source. Some loss of life likely occurred from one or both tornadoes.
- October 8, 1797: A tornado touched down in North Salem, New York, moving into Fairfield County. Six people were injured in Ridgefield, and possible tornado damage continued as far as Long Island Sound in Branford.
- August 2, 1799: A tornado destroyed two houses in New London County, affecting the towns of Franklin, Lebanon, and Bozrah.
- June 30, 1808: One or more tornadoes moved from Windsor to Coventry, killing one person.
- July 22, 1808: Trees and buildings were damaged by a tornado which moved from East Windsor to North Bolton.
- July 16, 1810: A tornado produced damage in or around Somers.
- August 1, 1812: A tornado passed from Westchester County, New York into Greenwich.
- July 22, 1817: Tornado produced tree damage from Woodbury to Watertown.
- August 13, 1817: A tornado destroyed 23 buildings in Wallingford.
- August 14, 1820: A tornado touched down east of Norwalk.
- June 3, 1836: A long-lived tornado tracked 30 miles (48 km) from Dutchess County, New York to Salisbury, seriously injuring many people.
- July 31, 1839: Six homes were damaged or destroyed on the west side of New Haven. A "heavy rumbling noise" was heard throughout the city.
- August 7, 1839: A possible tornado passed through a then-uninhabited area of Wallingford.
- August 14, 1840: A possible tornado struck Woodbridge.

== 1850–1949 ==
- August 9, 1851: A "tornado" (possibly a squall line) affected New Hartford, Suffield and Windsor.
- July, 1865: A tornado may have struck Birmingham.
- August 17, 1872: What may have been a small tornado hit Windsor Locks.
- September 15, 1876: A 300-yard (270 m) wide tornado unroofed several homes in northern Bridgeport.
- August 18, 1877: "Something like a tornado", described as a "whirling mass of black clouds" cut across Hartford, tearing down trees and branches.
- August 9, 1878: At least three tornadoes affected the state from a single storm system. The first touched down in South Kent, causing major damage but no injuries. The second, the Wallingford Tornado of 1878, touched down just outside Wallingford. A severe tornado, likely an F4, it smashed through the north side of town, completely destroying dozens of houses. At least 29 people were killed in that town (likely 34), the most by any tornado event in Connecticut history. A third tornado moved through Durham and Killingsworth, unroofing houses but again causing no injuries.
- May 29, 1880: A tornado touched down in Suffield, moving northeast and crossing the Connecticut River. It destroyed 25 buildings in Thompsonville and Enfield.
- July 14, 1881: A "terrific storm" downed trees "in all directions" in Meriden, also damaging a school and several other buildings.
- September 14, 1882: A tornado touched down outside of Winsted, destroying nine homes and five barns as it moved into town. Twenty people were injured, two of whom may have later died.
- August 25, 1885: A tornado passed through the towns of Bloomfield and Windsor, crossing the Connecticut River before dissipating. Nearly the entire tobacco crop in the area was destroyed, at a loss in the millions of dollars. Another tornado may have struck East Hartford a few weeks earlier.
- September 12, 1886: A tornado touched down outside of Ellington, Connecticut, destroying barns and downing trees before lifting near Burnside, Connecticut.
- September 27, 1899: A tornado passed from Norwalk to near Ridgefield, causing damage to trees and roofs in a path 50 to 300 feet (15 to 91 m) wide. Some buildings were completely destroyed.
- September 15, 1901: A damaging tornado swept through the village of Huntington around 7 PM. One man was killed when his house was torn from its foundation. Several barns were destroyed—one "completely disappeared"—and hundreds of trees were leveled on a path from modern-day Shelton to Monroe.
- August 28, 1911: A tornado cut a 3-mile (5 km) path through New Milford, Litchfield County, uprooting trees and damaging roofs.
- June 12, 1918: A "baby tornado" (possibly a microburst) caused $50,000 in damage, mainly to roofs and windows, in New Britain, Hartford County.
- August 7, 1918: A possible tornado touched down in Westbrook, causing roof damage and downing trees. A house was moved off its foundation in Fenwick.
- September 18, 1918: A tornado cut a path 130 to 160 feet (40 to 50 m) wide from Groton, through Mystic, and out into Long Island Sound. Small buildings, roofs, trees and telephone poles were damaged heavily. Several people received minor injuries from flying debris.
- August 30, 1920: A storm with "tornado features" caused damage on a small line from eastern Hamden to Guilford. A fireworks factory was destroyed, roofs were removed from four warehouses and a house, and hundreds of trees and utility poles were toppled. One boy was killed and thirty-three others were injured.
- July 13, 1922: A weak tornado tracked across Hartford, downing tree branches and utility poles.
- July 26, 1937: A tornado produced F2 damage while passing just south of Terryville and just north of Bristol.
- September 24, 1942: A tornado destroyed a church in Plainville and a garage in Bristol along a 3-mile (5 km) path.

== 1950–1974 ==
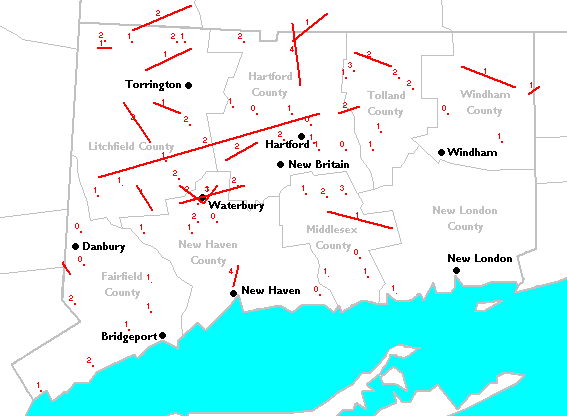
Tornado tracks from 1950 to 1999 in Connecticut, with their ratings on the Fujita scale

- July 12, 1950: An F2 tornado tracked 10 miles (16 km) through Middlesex County.
- July 14, 1950: An F2 tornado touched down in Ridgefield around 7:30 a.m., tearing the roof off the high school and downing trees through the center of town. Three people were injured.
- August 20, 1951: An F2 tornado briefly touched down in Willington, Tolland County.
- August 21, 1951: A long-tracked F2 tornado touched down in Southwestern Litchfield County, passing more than 40 miles (64 km) well into Hartford County. Another tornado, which was rated F3 (some sources say F2), touched down in northern Middlesex County, unroofing a factory and causing $100,000 in damage. Nine people were injured in the first tornado, with another eight injured in the second.
- May 10, 1954: An F3 tornado (some sources say F2) hit Windsorville at 9:30 a.m., destroying a house and some sheds, injuring two and causing $30,000 in damage. Additionally, an F2 tornado touched down in Northwestern Hartford County that afternoon.
- October 24, 1955: An F1 tornado touched down in central Hartford County, while an F2 touched down near Waterbury.
- August 8, 1956: An F0 tornado briefly touched down in East Glastonbury, Hartford County.
- June 19, 1957: An F1 tornado touched down in central Glastonbury, Hartford County.
- August 15, 1958: An F1 tornado briefly touched down in Northern Fairfield.
- August 21, 1958: An F1 tornado briefly touched down in Colebrook in Litchfield County.
- September 7, 1958: An F2 tornado injured two in Willington, Tolland County.
- May 12, 1959: An F2 tornado touched down in Salisbury, damaging mostly trees along a one-mile (1.6 km) path.
- May 30, 1959: An F1 tornado briefly touched down in Bloomfield, damaging a few greenhouses.
- August 29, 1959: An F0 tornado briefly touched down in southeastern New Haven County.
- April 26, 1961: An F1 tornado briefly touched down in western Tolland County.
- May 24, 1962: An F3 tornado tracked through Northern New Haven and Southern Hartford Counties. The tornado produced "near-F4 damage" in parts of Waterbury and Southington with more than 200 buildings destroyed and another 600 damaged. One person was killed, with another fifty injured, and the tornado caused $4,000,000 in damage along its 11.6-mile (18.7 km) path.
- June 18, 1962: An F2 tornado briefly touched down in eastern Litchfield County.
- August 19, 1965: An F2 tornado tracked 6 miles (10 km) through northern Tolland County.
- August 11, 1966: An F2 tornado touched down in northern Litchfield County, passing east-northeast into Massachusetts.
- August 9, 1968: An F1 tornado briefly touched down near Danbury.
- August 17, 1968: An F1 tornado touched down in southern Tolland County.
- August 20, 1968: An F1 tornado briefly touched down in northern Litchfield County.
- October 3, 1970: An F1 tornado injured one in northern Hartford County.
- July 19, 1971: An F2 tornado touched down near Norwalk.
- July 29, 1971: An F3 tornado (some sources say F2) moved along Main Street in downtown Waterbury, unroofing a factory and damaging some houses. Two people were injured.
- August 7, 1972: An F1 tornado tracked almost 10 miles (16 km) across northern Litchfield County.
- August 9, 1972: An F1 tornado touched down in southern Litchfield County.
- July 12, 1973: An F2 tornado touched down in southeastern Litchfield County.
- June 28, 1973: An F1 tornado injured one person in western Hartford County.
- June 29, 1973: An F1 tornado touched down in northwestern Litchfield County.
- August 31, 1973: An F2 tornado briefly touched down in central Hartford County.
- September 6, 1973: An F2 tornado touched down in eastern Hartford County, damaging houses in Manchester, Vernon, and Talcottville.
- September 18, 1973: Three tornadoes briefly touched down, an F1 tornado in Greenwich, an F2 tornado in southwestern Hartford county, and another F1 tornado in southern Tolland County.
- July 3, 1974: An F1 tornado tracked 5 miles (8 km) southeast through southern Litchfield County.

== 1975–1999 ==
NEXRAD radar loop of the supercell, with a visible hook echo, which produced the May 29, 1995 tornado in Southbury

- June 19, 1975: An F1 tracked 5 miles (8 km) through central Litchfield County.
- July 20, 1975: An F1 touched down near New Milford.
- June 30, 1976: An F2 touched down in northern Litchfield County.
- October 3, 1979: The Windsor Locks, Connecticut Tornado, an extremely destructive F4 tornado, one of the worst in Connecticut history, killed three and injured 500 in northern Hartford County. The tornado struck without warning, tearing through Bradley International Airport, destroying more than a dozen airplanes, and narrowly missing a Boeing 727 which was attempting to land. About 100 homes were completely leveled. Most of the $200+ million in damage was done in Windsor Locks and Suffield. This was the sixth-most damaging tornado in US history.
- July 28, 1982: An F1 tracked through central New Haven County.
- August 1, 1983: An F0 struck Middlesex County.
- July 5, 1984: An F2 tracked from Bristol to Farmington, injuring one person and causing $500,000 in damage to houses and cars.
- June 24, 1985: An F1 tracked 10 miles (16 km) across central Windham County.
- August 26, 1985: An F1 touched down in extreme eastern Windham County, passing into Rhode Island.
- July 10, 1989: The Northeastern United States tornado outbreak of 1989 produced at least three tornadoes in Litchfield and New Haven Counties, causing more than $100 million in damage. The first tornado, possibly a family of three tornadoes, destroyed Cathedral Pines Forest, and caused F2 damage to trees and homes in Cornwall, Milton, and Bantam, injuring four people. The second tornado, also an F2, unroofed or severely damaged 50 homes and injured 70 people on a path through Watertown, Oakville, and northern Waterbury. The final tornado was one of the worst in Connecticut history, cutting a 5-mile (8 km) path through Hamden. The F4 destroyed almost 400 structures and injured 40 people. No one was killed by these devastating tornadoes, though a girl was killed when straight-line winds blew a tree onto her tent.
- June 29, 1990: An F0 briefly touched down in Danbury. Seven people were injured by flying glass.
- July 5, 1992: An F0 struck near New Fairfield.
- July 14, 1992: An F1 briefly touched down in southern Windham County.
- August 4, 1992: An F0 struck central Hartford County, and an F1 struck the Long Hill section of Trumbull.
- July 10, 1993: An F0 briefly touched down in western Windham County.
- June 29, 1994: A strong microburst accompanied by an F0 struck Avon. Many trees were downed, but there was very little property damage.
- May 29, 1995: An F1 tracked 2 miles (3 km) from South Britain to Southbury around 6:20 PM. Many trees were downed, and several homes sustained minor damage.
- July 23, 1995: An F0 struck the town of Prospect. A tractor-trailer was thrown 200 yards (180 m) through the air, but no injuries were reported.
- July 3, 1996: An F1 touched down just north of downtown Waterbury, causing damage to Wilby High School.
- July 9, 1996: An F1 downed trees in Monroe.
- May 31, 1998: An F1, part of a large tornado outbreak, briefly touched down near Washington.
- June 30, 1998: Two F1 tornadoes briefly touched down in Killingworth and Lyme, and an F0 briefly touched down in Chester.

== 2000–present ==
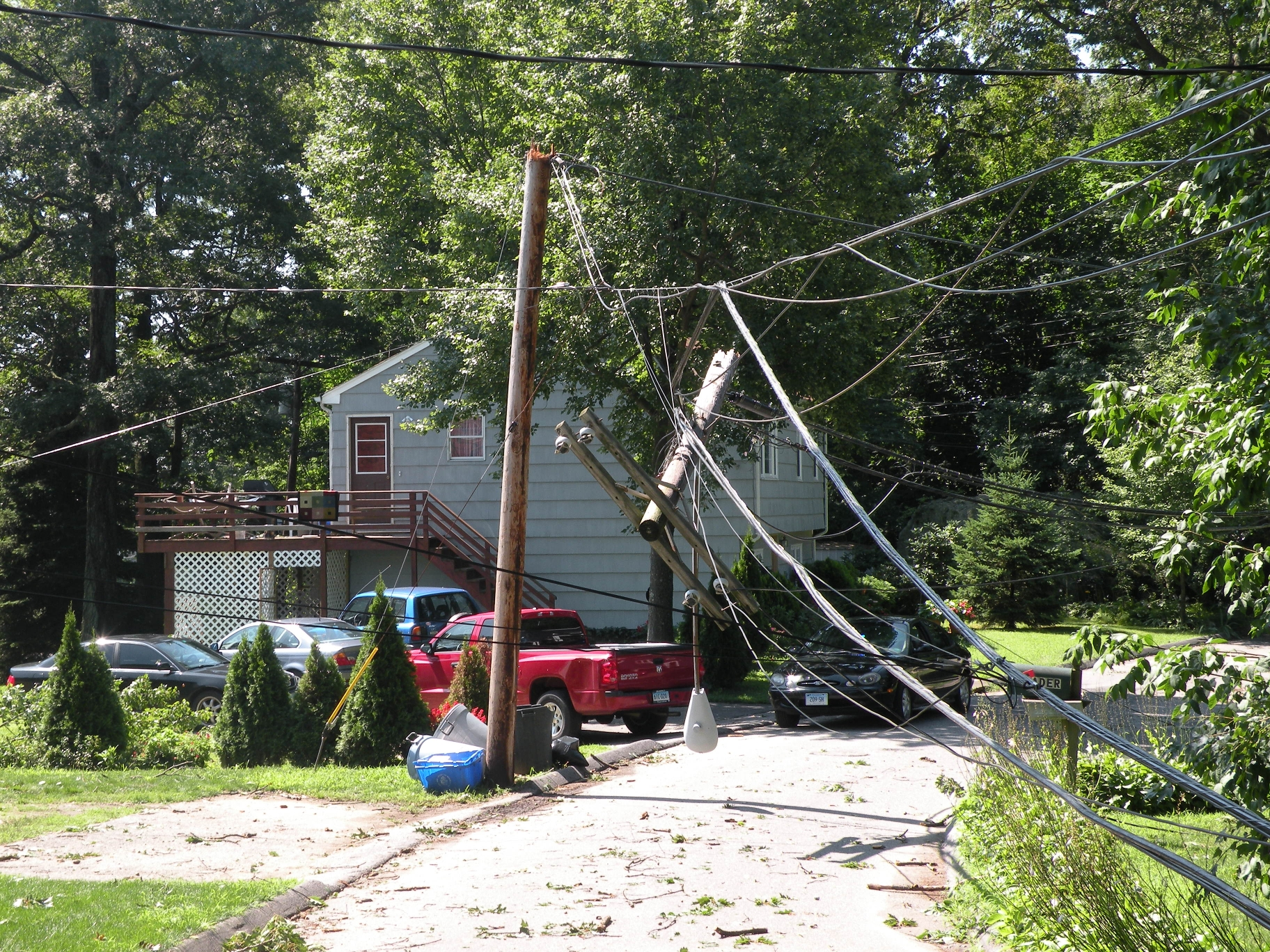
Damage to a power pole in Shelton from the July 31, 2009 tornado

- August 16, 2000: An F1 touched down in Ellington. It tossed several large trailers through the air and damaged a cow barn.
- June 23, 2001: An isolated supercell produced three tornadoes in the state. The first, an F1, hit a golf course in Washington, demolishing a storage building and a tennis court, and injuring one person. The second tornado, rated an F2, touched down in Torrington near Torrington Middle School, damaging the roof and destroying bleachers and a storage shed. The final tornado, an F0, produced minor damage to the East Hartland fire station.
- July 1, 2001: An F0 tracked 10 miles (16 km) across southern Litchfield County, touching down seven times along its path from New Milford to Roxbury.
- May 31, 2002: An F1 touched down in Brookfield, followed by a brief, F0 touchdown in Southbury along Interstate 84.
- June 6, 2002: An F1 destroyed two acres (8,000 m^{2}) of "healthy mature forest" in Salisbury.
- June 16, 2002: An F0 briefly touched down in Lanesville. In Montville, a waterspout formed over Gardner Lake, causing F1 damage to trees, houses, and cars upon crossing onto land.
- July 12, 2006: The Westchester tornado that produced F2 damage across the border in New York entered Greenwich at 4:01 PM, producing F1 damage on the north side of town. It may have briefly touched down a second time just north of the Merritt Parkway.
- May 16, 2007: Just three months after the switch to the Enhanced Fujita Scale for rating tornadoes, a skipping tornado, rated EF1, tracked 4 to 5 miles (6 to 8 km) from Bethel to Newtown. Widespread wind damage also affected other parts of the state.
- May 28, 2007: An EF0 landspout damaged the roof of a barn in Somers, on an otherwise calm day.
- June 26, 2009: An EF1 tornado hit the town of Wethersfield. Widespread damage across town especially near the area of Wolcott Hill. Many downed trees caused damages, most notably in Old Wethersfield where a tree split a house in town, and destroyed a front porch. Damage was estimated at $2.4 million.
- July 31, 2009: Significant wind damage was reported across the state, including two EF1 tornadoes. The first tornado caused tree and minor property damage along a 0.5-mile (0.80 km) path through eastern Shelton. The second downed trees along a sporadic 2.75-mile (4.4 km) path in Madison. Many trees were also snapped and uprooted in Fairfield, Milford, Guilford, Chester, Old Lyme and Naugatuck.
- June 24, 2010: A tornado briefly touched down in downtown Bridgeport, embedded within a larger area of strong wind damage which downed trees and damaged several buildings. 9 roofs were damaged causing the city to declare a state of emergency. The National Weather service confirmed it as an EF1 tornado, estimating it to be 100 yards wide with winds of at least 100 mph. The damage was especially concentrated to the east end of Bridgeport and the Lordship section of Stratford. Both areas were declared states of emergencies for at least 24 hours after the storm hit.
- July 21, 2010: Several severe storms spawned five brief tornadoes and spread straight-line wind damage across the state. One touchdown was reported in Litchfield, and an EF1 tornado was confirmed in Bristol. The Bristol tornado was on the ground for 1.5 miles (2.4 km) and had winds at 90 mph. A touchdown was also confirmed in Litchfield, Thomaston, the Terryville section of Plymouth and Bristol Wednesday afternoon, the National Weather Service said. The tornado touched down in East Litchfield around Litchfield Road, in Thomaston near D. Welter Way, in Terryville near North Street and in Bristol near Blakeslee and High streets. Tree tops were twisted off and several trees were uprooted. In Bristol, the tornado's path was 1.5 miles (2.4 km) long and about 25 yards (23 m) wide. Wind gusts were about 90 miles per hour (140 km/h). The paths in the other three towns were shorter. All of the touchdowns were caused by the same supercell.
- June 9, 2011: A brief EF1 tornado occurred within a larger area of straight-line winds in Litchfield County.
- July 1, 2013: A series of three tornadoes touch down across the state; one in Fairfield County and two in Hartford County. Majority of impact limited to downed trees, though the EF1 caused notable structural damage near East Windsor.
- July 10, 2013: An EF1 tornado touched down in Andover, just off East Street on the Hebron town line. It traveled north-east through Coventry before lifting in Mansfield. Damage consisted of uprooted trees and some trees with the tops snapped off. The only structural damage found was to a sheet metal shed. No injuries were reported. The most severe damage was located in Coventry near Coventry Lake. It was estimated to have had wind speeds around 90 mph, a width of 100 yards, with a discontinuous path of 11.2 miles.
- July 27, 2014: An EF0 tornado caused minor damage in Wolcott, mostly at and near the high school.
- August 10, 2016: An EF0 tornado caused minor damage in the Montowese section of North Haven.
- May 15, 2018: Four tornadoes, three EF1 and one unrated, snapped and uprooted numerous trees in Litchfield and New Haven County. The first touched down in Winsted, causing damage to houses and trees across 8 city blocks. The second was observed over Barkhamsted Reservoir, which caused no damage and so was not rated on the EF scale. The third tornado struck Southbury and Oxford, damaging the roof of Great Oak Middle School, causing the district to miss 5 days of school. The final tornado passed through Beacon Falls, Bethany, and northern Hamden near Sleeping Giant State Park. A barn was destroyed in Bethany. Many roads were left impassible due to downed trees, and several people were trapped in cars. This was part of a larger severe weather outbreak in the Northeastern United States that produced at least 7 tornadoes, and also produced widespread severe straight line winds that killed 5 people.
- July 17, 2018: An EF-0 tornado touched down briefly west of Ashford Lake in Ashford, with peak winds up to 80 to 85 miles per hour, causing minor damage.
- August 4, 2018: An EF-0 tornado with winds of approximately 80 miles per hour touched down in Woodstock, causing minor property damage and moderate tree damage. The thunderstorm that sparked the Woodstock tornado then moved into Webster, MA, where another tornado, this one much more destructive, touched down.
- October 2, 2018: Two tornadoes occurred in the state that day. An EF-1 tornado struck New Canaan, Connecticut and lifted near or in Norwalk, Connecticut, with winds of around 100 miles an hour. The path was approximately 300 feet wide and began at about 5:29 PM, after a Tornado Watch was issued. A funnel cloud connected to this same storm was also spotted in Eastern Norwalk, by workers of a local electronics store. An EF-0 tornado touched down in Mansfield, Connecticut after the EF-1, with winds up to 70 mph being recorded. The path was about a half mile wide and caused very little damage. The only Tornado Warning issued by the National Weather Service for this storm occurred in New Canaan, after the tornado there touched down.
- October 29, 2018: An EF-0 tornado in Stonington downed and uprooted some trees.
- September 4, 2019: An EF-1 tornado briefly touched down and struck the towns of Coventry and Mansfield with a discontinuous 3.2 mile path with winds of up to 90 mph. It knocked down many trees in the areas and only caused minor damage to a daycare, knocking over its sign.
- August 2, 2020: Two tornadoes touched down in Litchfield County that day; an EF-0 touched down in Sharon at around 5:30 pm, traveling 0.25 miles with an estimated wind speed of 80 mph, uprooting trees and damaging a market. Another tornado, this time an EF-1, briefly touched down in Falls Village at 6:10 pm, traveling 1.7 miles with a wind speed of 90 mph. Multiple reports of tornado sightings were made to a local 911 call center in town.
- August 4, 2020: A waterspout came onto shore in Saugatuck Shores, doing EF1 damage to a house and trees. This tornado was caused in relation to Hurricane Isaias.
- August 27, 2020: Three tornadoes impacted the state. A brief EF-0 caused tree damage in Kent. A second brief EF-0 tornado caused tree damage along Quanopaug trail in Woodbury. A third large and moderately strong tornado impacted areas around Hamden in a 11.1 mile long path. The tornado reached a maximum strength of EF1 with 110 mph winds as it impacted North Haven.
- April 21, 2021: An EF-0 tornado touched down in Kent, Connecticut causing damage to trees.
- July 18, 2021: An EF-0 tornado touched down in Somers, Connecticut causing damage in the area.
- November 13, 2021: An unusual late season severe weather event caused at least 4 tornadoes to spawn in the state that day. An EF-1 touched down in Stonington, and 3 EF-0s touched down in Cheshire, Branford, and Plainfield. These had been the first recorded tornadoes Connecticut had seen in the month of November since 1950, when records started being kept.
- July 28, 2022: a brief and unexpected EF0 tornado occurred near Colebrook, Connecticut. It was formed by afternoon thunderstorms, even though forecasts didn't expect the thunderstorms to produce a tornado. It caused minor damage and threw debris on its 5-mile path and reached a max wind speed of 75 MPH
- August 12, 2023: An EF-0 occurred in Roxbury. The Tornado was observed and captured on video in the dark illuminated by lightning near Town Line Road. Damage was limited to trees as the tornado occurred mostly over open farm fields. The tornado lasted from 9:00pm to 9:05pm, travelled northwest for .8 miles, was 30 yards wide and had an estimated wind speed of 80 mile per hour.
- August 18, 2023: An EF-1 occurred on Bass Road and Route 14 in Scotland at 7:53am, one of five tornadoes that day in CT, MA, and RI. The storm had a 2.7 mile path with winds to 100 mph. While there wasn't much in the way of structural damage observed, other than gutter damage to two homes, there was significant tree damage. It was estimated that well over one hundred trees were either downed or sheared off at their tops.
- September 13, 2023: During a small tornado outbreak across southern New England that produced a total of 4 tornadoes, an EF1 tornado touched down in Killingly at 4:10 PM, causing widespread tree and roof damage, as well as strong winds. This tornado travelled into Foster, before dissipating shortly after.
- June 21, 2024: An EF-0 occurred in the town of Harwinton around 5pm. The tornado started in Northwest Harwinton and tracked 2 miles to the south, with a width of 250 yards and an estimated wind speed of 85 miles per hour. Damage was limited to trees.

== See also ==
- Enhanced Fujita Scale
- Fujita scale
- List of North American tornadoes and tornado outbreaks
