= SS Wafra oil spill =

Crude oil spill at Cape Agulhas in 1971

History
- Name: SS Wafra
- Namesake: Wafra
- Owner: Getty Tankers
- Operator: Overseas Tankship Corp
- Port of registry: Liberia
- Builder: Nagasaki Works, Mitsubishi Shipbuilding and Engineering Co
- Launched: 7 August 1955
- Completed: 1956
- Identification: 1456
- Fate: Sunk by South African Air Force on 12 March 1971 to contain an oil spill.

General characteristics
- Class & type: Oil tanker
- Tonnage: 27,400 GRT (increased to 36,697 GRT or 68,600 DWT in August 1970)
- Installed power: 17,600 shaft horsepower (13,100 kW)
- Propulsion: Steam turbine

The SS Wafra oil spill occurred on 27 February 1971, when SS Wafra, an oil tanker, ran aground while under tow near Cape Agulhas, South Africa. Approximately 200,000 barrels of crude oil were leaked into the ocean. The larger part of the ship was refloated, towed out to sea, and then sunk by the South African Air Force to prevent further oil contamination of the coastline.

== Grounding and sinking ==
Western Cape, South Africa

Wafra left Ras Tanura in Saudi Arabia on 12 February 1971 bound for Cape Town, South Africa, with a cargo of 472,513 barrels (75,123.6 m^{3}) (63,174 tonnes) of Arabian crude oil on board. Half the cargo was owned by Chevron Oil Sales Co., and the other half by Texaco Export, Inc.

The ship was rounding the southern tip of Africa at 6:30 am on 27 February 1971 when the piping that brought seawater on board to cool her steam turbine failed. The engine room flooded, incapacitating the ship. She was taken under tow the following day by the Russian steam tanker Gdynia, which – finding the task too difficult – handed the tow over to Pongola 7 miles (11 km) off Cape Agulhas, later the same day. The tow cable subsequently broke, and Wafra grounded on a reef near Cape Agulhas at 5:30 pm on 28 February. All six of the port cargo tanks, as well as two of the six center tanks, were ruptured, resulting in approximately 26,000 tonnes of oil leaking at the grounding site, of which 6,000 tonnes washed up at Cape Agulhas. Another source estimated that nearly 14 million gallons of oil was lost in the event (approx 45500 tonnes).

A 20-mile (32 km) by 3-mile (4.8 km) oil spill resulted, which affected a colony of 1200 African penguins on Dyer Island near Gansbaai. Beaches from Gansbaai to Cape Agulhas were oiled by the slick. American newspapers reported that the slick was up to 35 miles (56 km) long. Almost 4,000 US gallons (15,000 L) of detergent was sprayed onto the slick in efforts to prevent it washing ashore or harming marine life.

The ship was refloated and pulled off the reef on 8 March by the German tug Oceanic, but started to break apart. To prevent further oil contamination of the coastline, the larger section was towed 200 miles (320 km) out to sea to the edge of the continental shelf (36°57′S 20°42′E), leaving a 160-kilometre (99 mi) oil slick in her wake. On 10 March 1971, Buccaneer aircraft of the South African Air Force attempted to sink her with AS-30L missiles, but succeeded only in starting a fire. The ship burned for two days before a Shackleton aircraft was eventually able to sink it with depth charges in 1,830 metres (6,000 ft) of water.

If Wafra had been a twin screw, two engine room ship, loss of an engine would most likely not have caused the loss of the whole ship. At the time, the oil spill was in the top twenty most disastrous tanker spills on record.

== Aftermath ==
In the wake of the accident, the South African Department of Transport realised that despite many Very Large Crude Carriers (VLCCs) using the Cape sea route each year, the authorities did not have ocean-going tugs that were able to assist them in distress, and to protect sensitive marine areas by breaking up oil spills with chemical dispersants. They therefore set up an oil spill prevention service known as Kuswag (Coastwatch) and commissioned two new salvage tugs, John Ross and Wolraad Woltemade. The two tugs, with their 26,200 horsepower (19,500 kW) engines, held the record as the world's largest salvage tugs.

The incident is featured in the 1975 book Supership by Noel Mostert.

== See also ==
- Oswego-Guardian/Texanita collision
- Venpet-Venoil collision
- Torrey Canyon oil spill
