= John Ross Bridge (South Africa) =

- Coordinates: 29°10′24.18″S 31°26′18.02″E
- Carries: R102 Regional Route
- Crosses: Tugela River
- Locale: KwaZulu-Natal, South Africa

Characteristics
- Total length: 412.5 metres (1,353 ft)
- Height: 25 metres (approx)
- Longest span: 55 metres

History
- Construction cost: R9.3 million
- Opened: 1959; 66 years ago (original); 1 October 1988; 37 years ago (rebuilt)
- Closed: 1987; 38 years ago (destroyed by flood)

The John Ross Bridge is a steel reinforced concrete bridge spanning the Tugela River, located in KwaZulu-Natal, South Africa. The bridge sits on the R102 regional route from Durban to Richards Bay, crossing the river close to the township of Mandini. The original bridge was completed in 1959 after a fast construction period of just 3 years, but was rebuilt after the 1987 KwaZulu-Natal floods in what is believed to be record time for a structure of its size. The bridge comprises a span of approximately 412.5m and is founded on concrete caissons bored a depth of approximately 18m to the bedrock below the river bed.

== History ==
The bridge is named after the Scotsman Charles Rawden Maclean, who during his time in South Africa during the Anglo-Zulu War, came to be known as "John Ross".

The original bridge in this location was completed in 1959, and replaced the original single-lane steel road traffic bridge which crossed the river further upstream at Bonds Drift, alongside the railway bridge leading directly into the township of Mandini. The original 1959 structure was destroyed during the 1987 South Africa floods causing all coastal road traffic to be redirected to the original steel bridge and one-half of the unused rail bridge, resulting in an estimated increased in road user costs of approximately R40,000 per day. The reconstruction of the bridge after the floods was therefore considered a national priority by the South African government, leading to a reconstruction of the structure in record time.

The bridge collapse occurred when one of the central piers was displaced from its caisson, despite the water level being well below the underside of the bridge deck. Loss of this initial pier resulted in a chain reaction event, resulting in destruction of the remaining piers and loss the entire bridge structure. Following the initial ground and foundational work, the new bridge segments were lifted into place on average one every 5.9 days, with the entire span being completed in just 89 days.

The new bridge was reopened by the Administrator of Natal RM Cadman on 31 October 1988, approximately one year after the floods and after a construction time of approximately 6 months, thought to be a record for a structure of this type and size.
