= Charles Rawden Maclean =

British sea captain (1815–1880)

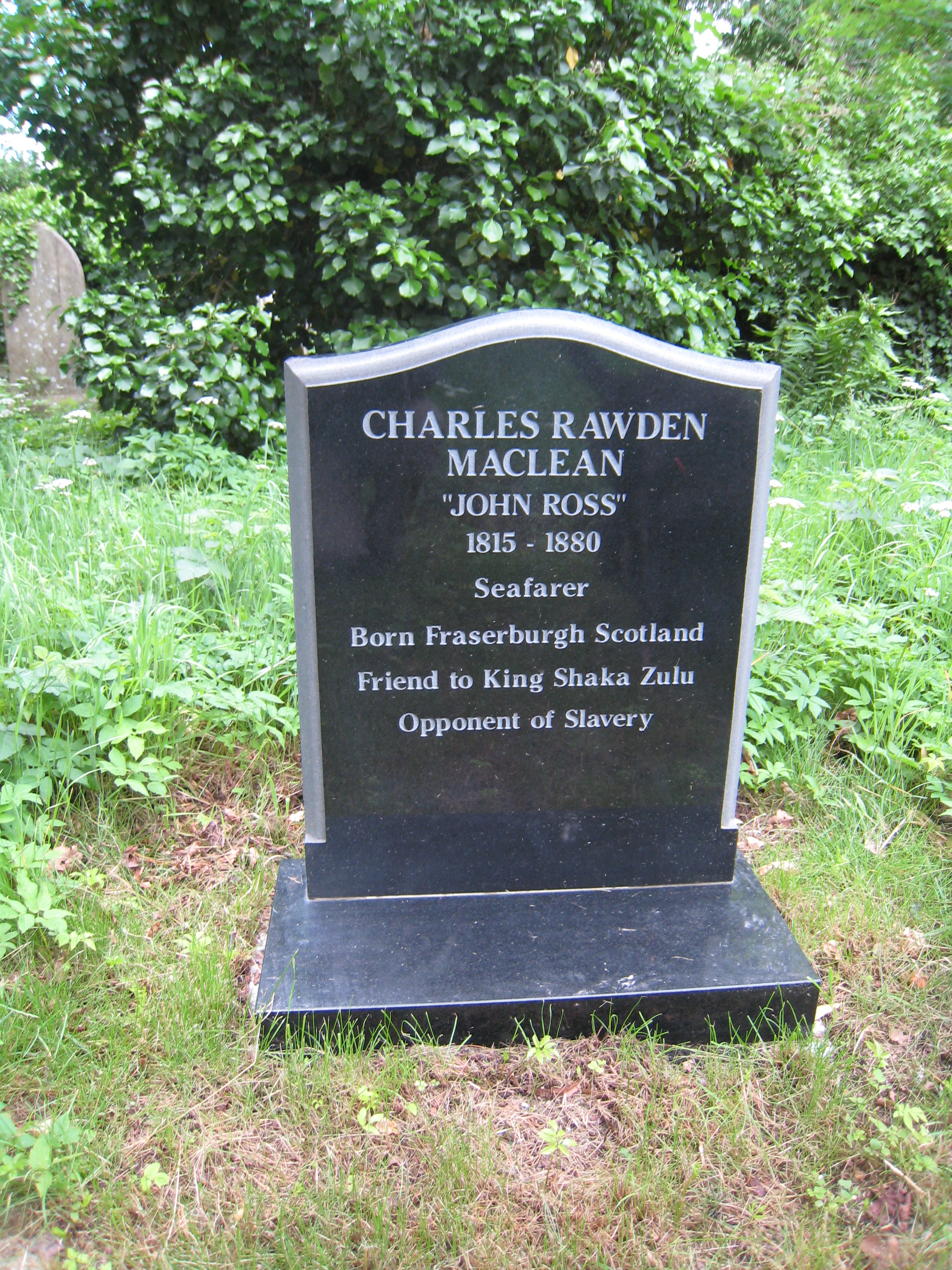
The gravestone of Charles Rawden Maclean, alias "John Ross", in Southampton Old Cemetery

Charles Rawden Maclean, also known as "John Ross", was born on 17 August 1815 (Note: The date of Maclean’s birth is uncertain. Gordon, quotes Maclean’s date of birth as being 22 November 1812, but the date on his tombstone (1815) corresponds to the date (17 August 1815) given by the Fraserburgh Heritage Centre. Doubt has been cast of 1815 as being the year of his birth as his exploits in 1827 would have been remarkable for a 15-year-old, but almost unbelievable for a 12-year-old. Ritter states that Maclean was 14 and Bulpin states that Maclean was 15 when he made his epic journey in 1827 giving credence to 1812 as being his date of birth rather than 1815. Maclean, writing in The Nautical Magazine in 1853, described himself as "being but a boy thirteen years old". He does not clarify whether he was thirteen when he arrived at Port Natal or when he left.) in Fraserburgh and died 13 August 1880 at sea on the RMS Larne while en route to Southampton. In a tribute to him during the re-dedication of his grave in Southampton in 2009, the Zulu War author and broadcaster Ian Knight said:

Maclean was a champion of liberty and his stone will be one of the few inscriptions in a British cemetery which commemorates a positive interaction between the British and Zulu people; most existing memorials commemorate individuals who were involved in Anglo-Zulu conflict.

== Accuracy of contemporary records ==
There is considerable speculation regarding Maclean's early life. Stephen Gray identifies three contemporary sources from which information pertaining to Maclean can be drawn – works by Nathaniel Isaacs, Francis Fynn, and McLean himself. Gray is of the view that Isaac's writings were intended to make a sensation of his own adventures rather than being a matter of historic record. In these writings, Maclean was referred to as John Ross, possibly a nickname on account of his ginger hair, though it has been alleged that Isaacs invented that name because he had forgotten Maclean's real name.

== Port Natal and Zululand ==
In 1825 Isaacs was apprenticed to serve on the 150 ton brig, The Mary under Lieutenant King. En route to Cape Town, the Mary called in at St Helena where Isaacs boarded as a "companion" to King. After discharging her cargo at Cape Town, King sailed for Port Natal to search for the adventurers Francis Farewell, an East India merchant, and Francis Fynn, a physician, from whom nothing had been heard for eighteen months. Leaving Cape Town on 26 August 1825 The Mary made several stops along the Southern African coast, anchoring off Port Natal on 1 October. When entering the port, she struck a sandbank and foundered.

=== Relations with Shaka ===
On reaching shore, the party found Farewell's camp, but Farewell and his party were on a hunting expedition. The crew of The Mary were instructed by King to rebuild her, a task that would take three years since the timber had first to be seasoned. Once Farewell returned, King and some members of ship's company, though not MacLean, paid a courtesy visit to Dingane, brother of the Zulu king Shaka. Once Shaka heard of King's arrival, King and his entire party were summoned to his kraal.

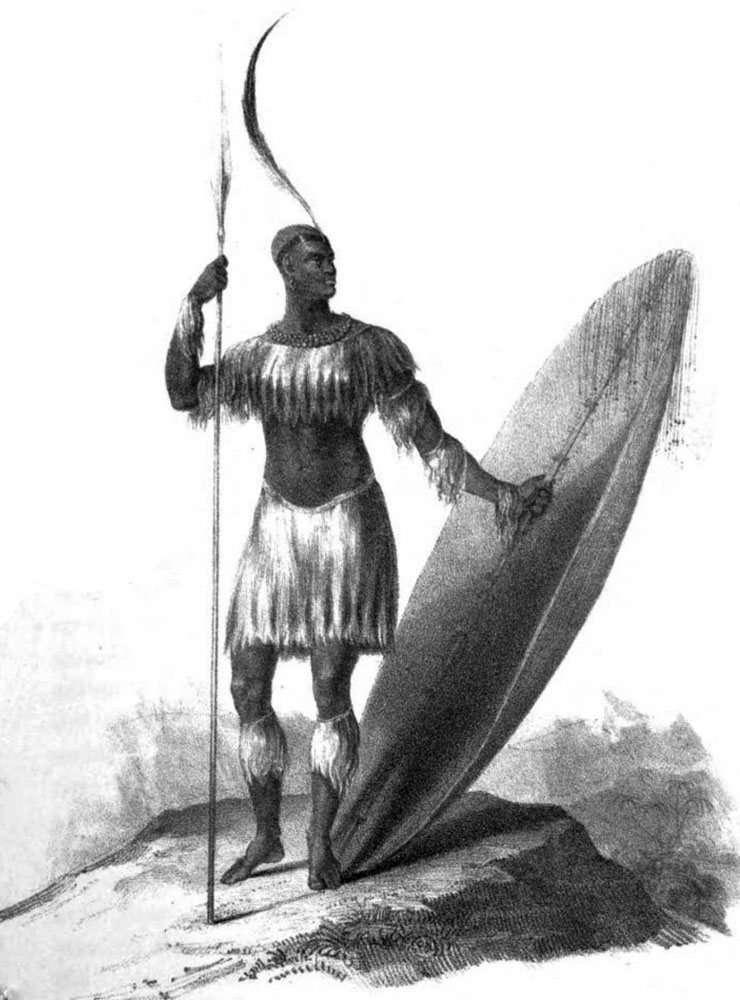
Shaka, king of the Zulu

The party were well received by Shaka and were given permission to stay, but when the party left, Shaka demanded that Maclean remain behind. Maclean spent a considerable time at Shaka's kraal. In a letter to The Times in 1875 he wrote "During the four years of my residence in Natal, three years were, with little interruption, passed at King Shaka's residence." In reality, a little over three years elapsed between the foundering of The Mary and Maclean’s final departure from Natal. Isaacs wrote about a trip that he, Maclean and others made in August 1826 to barter for food from the local population. If Isaacs was accurate in recording Maclean’s presence in the party, this would have cut further into the time that Maclean spent at Shaka's kraal.

=== Walk to Delagoa Bay ===
Two years after The Mary had foundered, the settlement had run out of medicine and fresh supplies had to be bought in Delagoa Bay. Isaacs wrote "... when John Ross Lieutenant King's apprentice, a lad of about fifteen years of age, acute, shrewd and active, was appointed to go the journey".

Maclean, accompanied by two porters, agreed to walk to the Portuguese settlement at Delagoa Bay to replenish their supplies. The journey, 450 kilometres (280 mi) as the crow flies, (Note: Measured on Google Maps) was probably more than 600 kilometres (370 mi) after taking into account deviations to avoid the then-uncharted wetlands and mangrove swamps (now nature reserves). The journey would still take them over crocodile and hippopotamus-infested rivers, including the 300 metres (980 ft) wide Tugela River. (Note: The width of the Tugela was measured on Google Maps at the point where the N2 crosses the river) Isaacs, Maclean and two porters journeyed first to the kraal of Shaka, the king of the Zulu where the king was so impressed by their courage that he detailed an escort of 10 warriors to accompany Maclean, who continued to Delagoa Bay. Once Maclean reached the Tsonga territory that lay between the Lebombo Mountains and the sea, he paid tribute to Makasane, a Tsonga chief.

On arrival at Delagoa Bay, he was first suspected of being a Zulu spy, but was nevertheless given permission to acquire the required medicines. Such was the local admiration for Maclean that he was given the medicines by well-wishers. Maclean only stayed in Delagoa Bay for three days as he was appalled by the slave trade that he witnessed there. He returned to Port Natal following the coast thereby avoiding Shaka's kraal – his return journey having taken just three weeks.

Most of the details of his walk to Delagoa were published by Isaacs, with Maclean devoting but one sentence to his exploits.

=== Final months in Natal ===
The rebuilt ship, now the Elizabeth and Susan, eventually left Port Natal on 30 April 1828 under the captaincy of King. In addition to Isaacs and Maclean, she also carried three Zulu ambassadors led by Chief Sothobe from Shaka who were instructed to make contact with King George. After the vessel made land at Port Elizabeth, the ambassadors were poorly treated and returned with King, Maclean and Isaacs, reaching Port Natal on 17 August. King, who had contracted dysentery died in Port Natal on 7 September. On 22 September, Shaka was assassinated at Dukuza by his half-brother Dingane and on 1 December many of the white residents of Port Natal, including Farewell, Isaacs and Maclean, put to sea for their own safety.

== St Lucia ==
In 1830 Maclean went back to sea and was only to return to Port Natal when a ship on which he was serving put into port, but most of his work was in the sugar trade, sailing between London and St Lucia.

In 1831 Maclean made his first trip to St Lucia aboard the barque Sandwich and by 1840 had become master of the Susan King. In 1846 he was involved in an incident in Wilmington, North Carolina in which The British and Foreign Anti-Slavery Reporter hailed Maclean as a man of "firmness". The incident arose when he docked at Willmington and refused to comply with the local slavery regulations and surrender his black crew members to the harbour authorities. The authorities retaliated by refusing to allow local blacks to unload Maclean's ship.

In the 1850s Maclean wrote a number of articles for The Nautical Magazine. The first was a series of eleven articles relating to his experiences and observations in Natal. Articles one to nine appeared between January 1853 and January 1854, followed by a thirteen-month gap after which the last two appeared. It is ironic that the tenth article, in which he made a passing reference to the Wilmington incident, appeared as Isaacs was being investigated for assisting in the slave trade. In the last of his writings in The Nautical Magazine, published in 1857 in four parts, Maclean described his travels to and from St Lucia. Shortly after writing these articles, Maclean settled in St Lucia where he held many civic posts, including that of stipendiary magistrate where he was the de facto mediator between the interests of the white settler community and the emancipated slave community.

Maclean obtained his Master's Certificate of Competence in 1852 and in 1856 while captain of the barque Gilbert Munro he and his wife visited the warzone in Crimea where Mrs Maclean, along with Florence Nightingale, was one of the few women at Balaclava.

In 1875, by now the sole survivor of the Port Natal white community on the 1820s (Isaacs having died in 1872), he wrote a celebrated letter to The Times in support of Langalibalele who had been sentenced to life imprisonment on Robben Island for insurrection. This letter not only showed his insight of the Zulu culture, but was also his account of his walk to Delagoa Bay.

== Death, burial and memorials ==
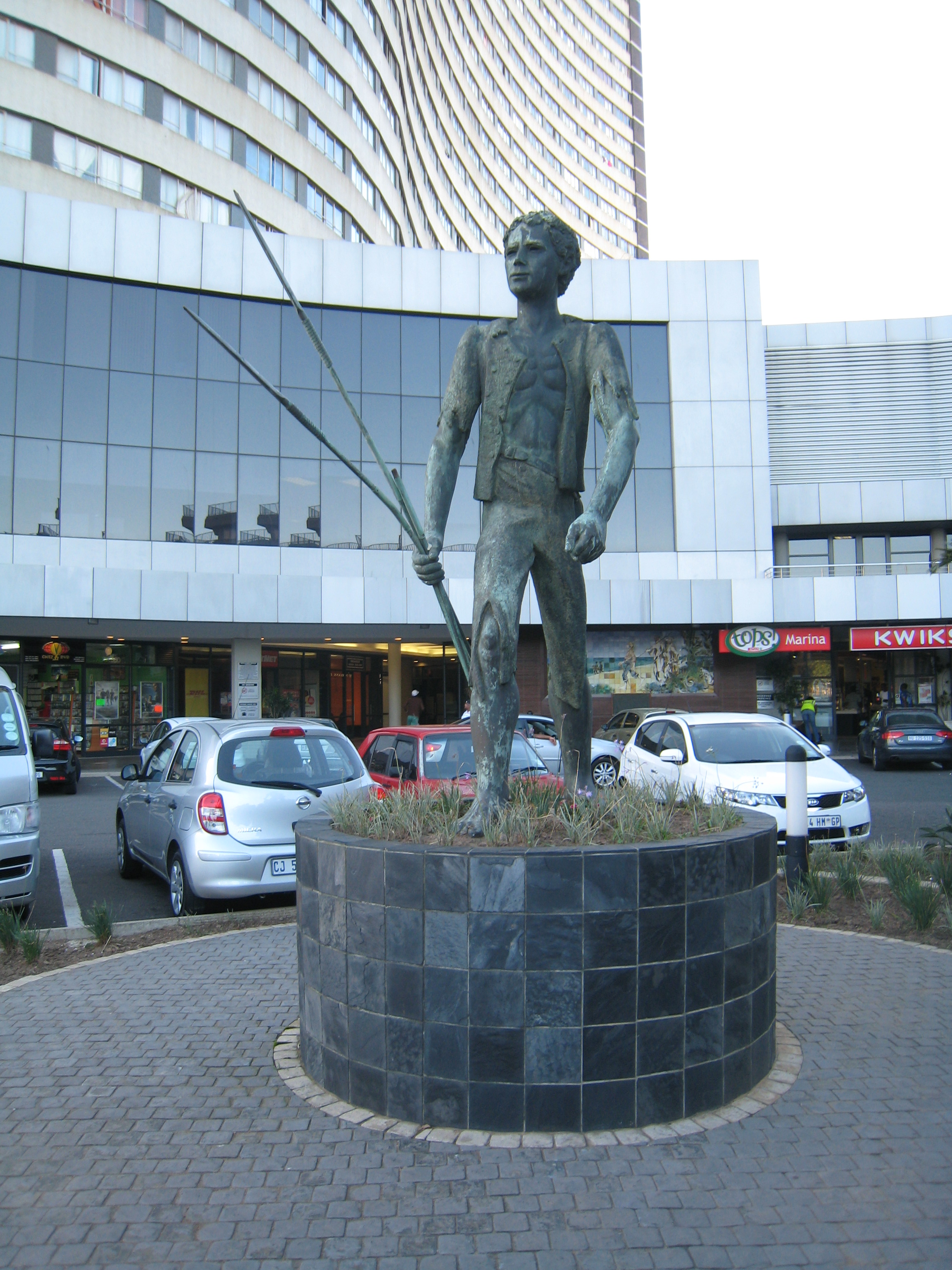
Statue of "John Ross" at John Ross House, Durban

In 1879 his health failed and the following year he travelled to England on the RMS Larne "in search of health". She called at Le Havre on 11 March 1880. Maclean died aboard ship on 13 March 1880, aged 64, in the Solent and was buried in a pauper's grave in the Old Cemetery in Southampton. On 2 May 2009 the grave was rededicated and a headstone erected. During the re-dedication, the grave was draped with the new flag of South Africa and the headstone with the Scottish saltire.

Maclean is commemorated in the city of Durban by a statue (created by Mary Stainbank) on the Victoria Embankment, outside John Ross House, and also by a plaque at the Old Fort, Durban.

The road bridge on the old N2 route over the Tugela River, 8 kilometres (5.0 mi) from its mouth, was named the John Ross Bridge in his honour. The original bridge was washed away in a storm on 26 September 1987, but has since been rebuilt. The P496 road, which links Richards Bay to Empangeni and the N2 highway is named the John Ross Highway.

He also gave his name to a salvage tug named S.A. John Ross, which was built at the Durban shipyards of James Brown & Hamer in 1976. At the time the tug was built, it was one of a pair of the most powerful tugs in the world.
