= Cape storm (2017) =

Storm in South Africa in June 2017

- Satellite imagery showing the storm front as it hit the Western Cape from before the storm hit on 5 June to the day the storm made landfall on the 7th to the day after on 8 June. The small red dots between Knysna and Port Elizabeth represent fires and thermal anomalies that spread in the wake of the storm.

Meteorological history
- Formed: June 3, 2017
- Dissipated: June 8, 2017

Extratropical cyclone
- Highest gusts: 120 km/h (75 mph)
- Lowest pressure: 995 hPa (mbar); 29.38 inHg

Overall effects
- Fatalities: 8 (storm); 7 (Knysna fires); 15 total deaths
- Damage: R4-5.1 billion(in 2017 money)
- Areas affected: Western Cape, Eastern Cape, Northern Cape

An unusually large south Atlantic storm struck the southern coast of South Africa on 7 June 2017 with wind gusts as high as 120 km/h. Wave heights of 9–12 metres (30–39 ft) were recorded between Cape Columbine and Cape Agulhas. The storm directly caused eight deaths and damaged 135 schools across the Western Cape. Around 800 homes were flooded across the city of Cape Town due to the storm.

Despite dropping up to 50 mm of rain, the storm did not break the Cape Town water crisis affecting the region.

== Knysna fires ==
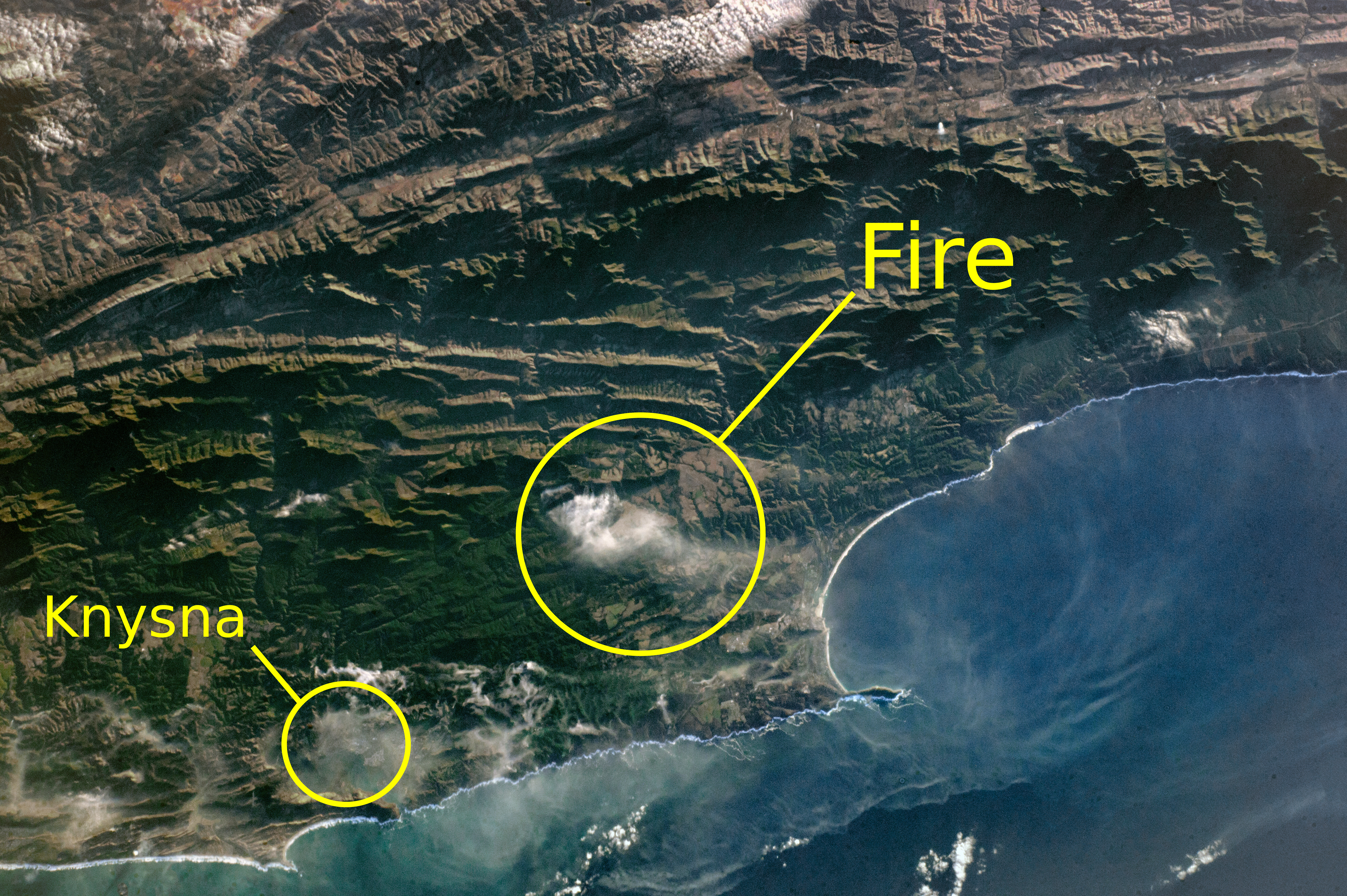
A satellite image of the Knysna fires taken on 10 June 2017.

High winds of 50 km/h caused by the storm fueled around 20 to 30 significant fires that swept through the town of Knysna and surrounding areas in the days after the storm. The fires killed seven people and displaced around 10,000 with around 600 structures in Knysna and Plettenberg Bay being destroyed.

The fires were notable for involving the largest deployment of firefighters in South Africa to that date. A total of 985 firefighters along with 78 vehicles, ten helicopters, and two fixed winged aircraft were used in combating the fire between 6 June and 10 June 2017. It is estimated that the fires caused between R4 billion and R5 billion (around US$297 million to US$372 million) in damages to private property with an additional R136 million worth of damage done to public infrastructure.

Unofficial preliminary conjecture suggested that some of the fires might have been lit by arsonists.

However, it was later found that the fires started as a result of lightning. Forensic scientist Dr David Klatzow ruled out arson as the cause of the Knysna fires which killed seven people and left many homeless.

== See also ==
- June 2024 South African storm complex
- 2022 KwaZulu-Natal floods
- 2022 Eastern Cape floods
- Weather of 2017
