= Chelmsford Nature Reserve =

Nature reserve in KwaZulu-Natal, South Africa

Coordinates: 27°57′06″S 29°55′23″E

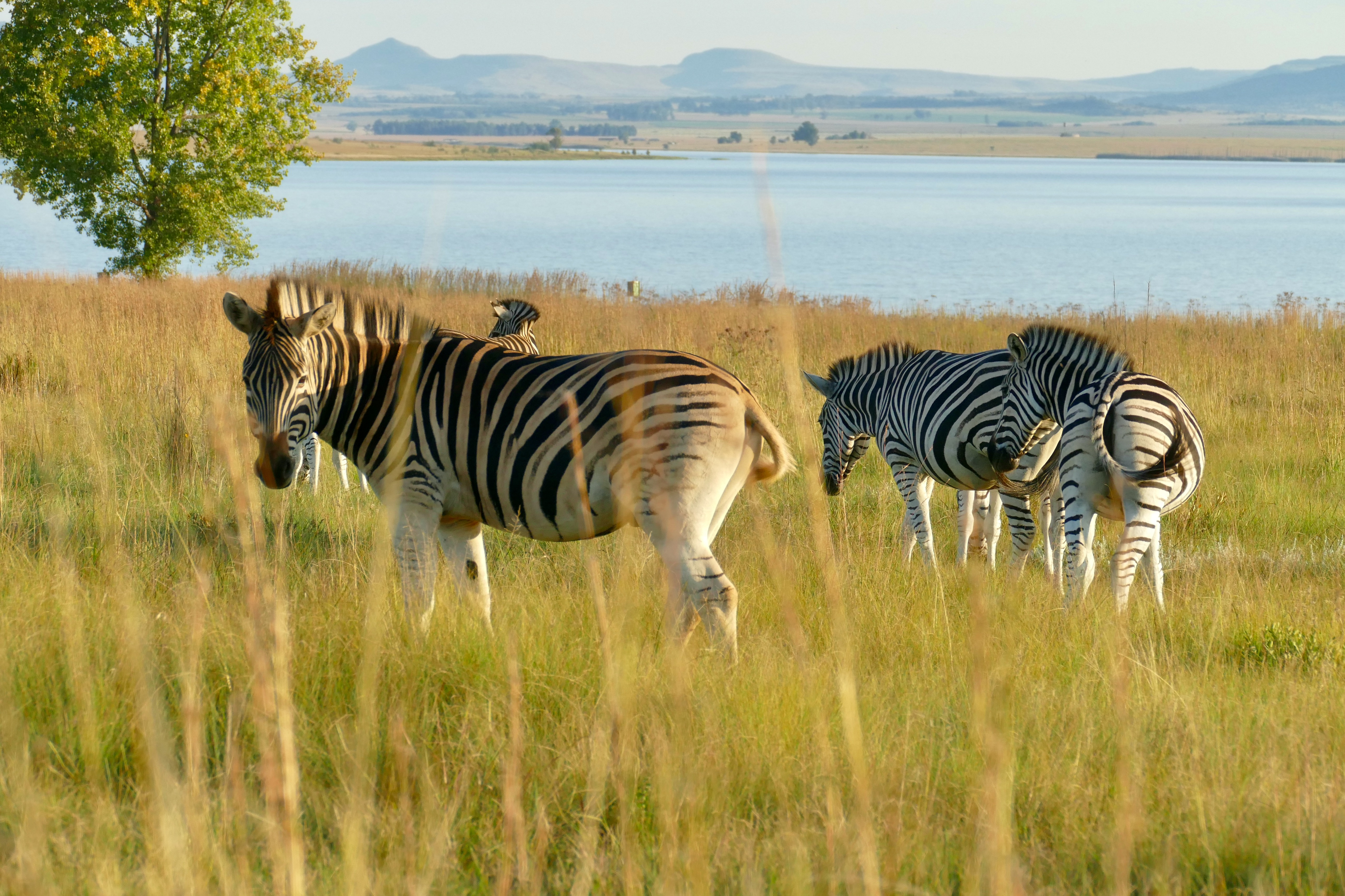
Plains zebra at Chelmsford Nature Reserve

Chelmsford Nature Reserve, also known as Chelmsford Dam Nature Reserve, is a nature reserve administered by Ezemvelo KZN Wildlife. It encloses Ntshingwayo Dam on the Ngagane River, and is situated some 38 kilometres (24 mi) south of Newcastle, in the KwaZulu-Natal province of South Africa. The reserve was gazetted on 31 July 1975.

== Wildlife ==
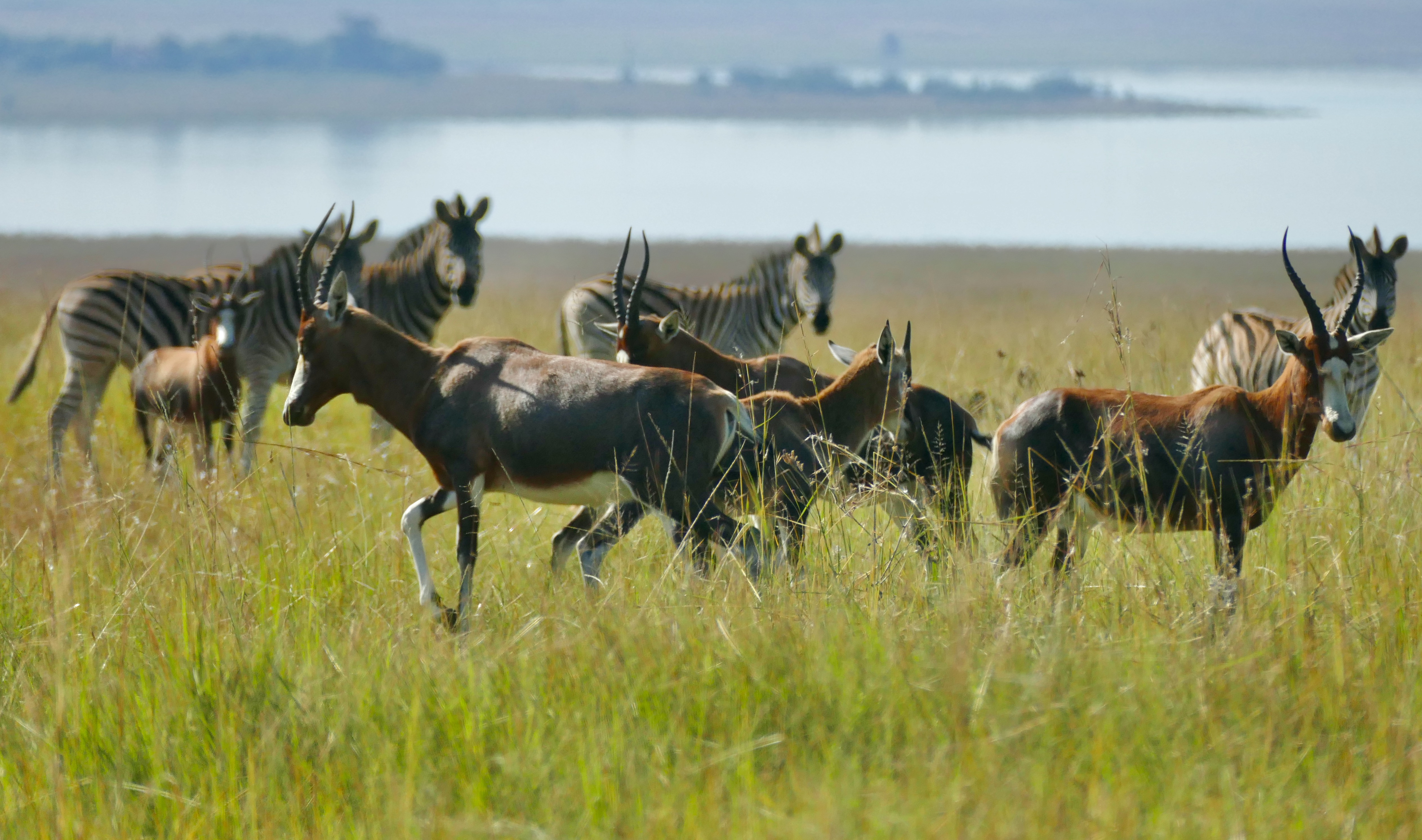
Herd of blesbok and zebra at Chelmsford Nature Reserve

Wildlife includes springbok, oribi, blesbok and red hartebeest. Numerous bird species occur, including the great crested grebe, knob-billed duck, pink-billed lark, black-bellied bustard, African grass-owl and bigger birds like the yellow-billed duck, greater flamingo, lesser flamingo, whiskered tern, osprey and a few fish eagle.

== Ntshingwayo Dam ==
Ntshingwayo Dam (formerly Chelmsford Dam) is the third largest in the province.

== Activities ==
Activities include windsurfing, canoeing and jet skiing.

== See also ==
- Protected areas of South Africa
