= BOQA =

Bridge Operations (or Operational) Quality Assurance (BOQA; pronounced /boʊˈkwɑː/ boh-KWAH) is a methodology utilised in shipping and which originates from the similar FOQA/FDM (Flight Operations Quality Assurance/Flight Data Monitoring) concept in aviation. BOQA is a methodology with which ship owners/operators, ship Captains, and other associated shipping stakeholders can automatically and systematically monitor, track, trend and analyse operational quality of (seagoing) vessels. The main target with BOQA is to provide a non-punitive platform for proactive analysis of vessel data to enable the enhancement of maritime safety . The BOQA methodology can be used in both conventional crewed ships and in autonomous or uncrewed vessels provided that adequate data sources are available.

== History ==
The original template for BOQA was laid out when Royal Caribbean approached Aerobytes Limited (a market leader in FOQA) to collaborate to provide a similar product for the maritime industry. https://www.aerobytes.co.uk/boqa/. Discussions were held as to what breaches of performance should be detected and two recorders were installed on RCCL vessels and discussions were also held with Carnival group to develop the BOQA concept. Aerobytes decided to focus on its core business of aviation and RCCL and Carnival went on to develop their own systems along with a few other companies who saw the potential.

At present BOQA is not mandated and therefore there are no strict rules as to what an effective BOQA system should contain, but once the enormous potential is realised it is entirely possible that might change.

== Description ==
BOQA is best developed as a non-punitive company-internal methodology or process, which has the overall target of assisting the ship Captain and the ship operator to maintain a high level of safety and operational quality.

BOQA has been described as:

- A system which delivers 24/7 electronic monitoring and electronic alarms when set operational parameters are deviated from
- During normal operations, BOQA will collect and analyse digital operational data direct from ships operation equipment
- BOQA data is unique because it can provide objective information that is not available through other methods
- A BOQA program can identify operational situations in which there is increased risk, allowing operators to take early corrective action before that risk results in an incident or accident
- The BOQA program is a tool in the operators overall operational risk assessment and prevention program
- BOQA, being proactive in identifying and addressing risk will enhance safety

The Oil Companies International Marine Forum (OCIMF) published in June 2013 the "Recommendations on the Proactive Use of Voyage Data Recorder Information" and went forth with submitting these recommendations as an info paper to the IMO (NAV 59/INF.9) 12/07/2013 with the title "The proactive use of Voyage Data Recorder (VDR) information". Main aspect with this paper was to use the ship's VDR as a data source for proactive safety monitoring. This paper called for:

- Routine transmission of VDR data ashore
- Auto-analysis of data
- Alerts on non-conformance

...and as such the paper described in essence a BOQA solution.

== Methodology ==
BOQA is used to objectively monitor the human operational performance and external factors, such as weather and other traffic around the vessel, by utilising various types of sensor and external data and comparing this data with defined best-practices and Standard operating procedure (SOPs). BOQA is usually not used to monitor the internal technical performance of the vessel machinery and equipment-base, which in most cases already has a wide range of proprietary monitoring and alarm functions.

BOQA is often a software system consisting of shipboard real-time data collection and sensing, automated data transmission between the vessel and shore and a shore-based system which receives, combines, analyses, alerts and stores the data according to defined rules and logic.

BOQA usually includes three "time-domains", i.e.:

1. a historical database of data and events and which is used for trend- and pattern analysis
2. a real-time reactive stream analytics component which can react to events or deviations in real- or near-real-time (NRT)
3. a predictive and pro-active component, which assists the operator in taking actions before an event occurs

=== Event types ===
BOQA is a continuously developing methodology, much in the same way as FOQA. At present time BOQA solutions are known to be able monitor some of the following various event types some of which might include:

- Cross-track error or deviation from a defined navigational route (the Costa Concordia disaster is known to be caused by such deviation)
- Safety corridor, i.e. is the ship sailing within its defined safe waters
- Collision risk based on Proximity (ship too close to own ship), CPA (Closest point of approach which measures the time and distance to a potential collision) and BCR (Bow Cross Range)
- Entry into a restricted or protected area
- Severe list, heel or roll
- Excessive accelerations
- Excessive turns (high ROT)
- Crash stop
- Heavy weather at present position and along a planned route (this is a predictive component)
- Sudden change in atmospheric pressure (which is an indicator of oncoming change in weather)
- Speed monitoring, which can be used for example in Charterparty Compliance monitoring
- Unscheduled stops along the route, which may lead to schedule-deviations and unwanted changes in arrival time
- Proximity to a shore line, ice edge or iceberg
- Rescue boat launch
- AIS (Automatic identification system) status change
- Black-out
- Port inactivity
- Excessive use of engine controls
- Under keel clearance
- Excessive rudder angles
- Traffic Separation Scheme violations

=== Inputs ===
BOQA relies on data from various sources. Some data sources could be but are not restricted to:

- Ship's AIS transponders (Automatic identification system), which give location, speed and course of the vessel itself and the surrounding traffic
- Ship's GPS (Global Positioning System), which also gives location, speed and course
- Ship's VDR (Voyage Data Recorder)
- Motion sensors
- Barometric pressure sensors
- Real-time weather data from sensors
- Weather forecast data
- Ship's navigational ECDIS (Electronic Chart Display and Information System) route
- External geographic data, such as restricted areas, PSSAs (Marine protected area) or TSS (Traffic Separation Scheme)
- Ship's electronic logbook

== Applications ==
BOQA is not yet known to be officially mandated or regulated by any official maritime bodies, such as International Maritime Organization, Classification societies or Flag state administrations.

Royal Caribbean Cruise line stated in their 2012 Stewardship report that they were evaluating a BOQA system.

In 2011, RCL began evaluating a voyage data recording analysis and trending system, known as Bridge Operations

Quality Assurance (BOQA), based on a similar program used in the aviation industry (the Flight Operations Quality Assurance program). In 2012 we made progress in the technical development of this system for marine use, and we have installed two prototypes on our vessels for testing purposes. This system will enhance our data analysis that supports our accident prevention initiatives.

Carnival Corporation & plc is known to have a large scale in-house developed BOQA solution, which consists of a data-system (Neptune) and a 24/7 staffed Fleet Operations Centre in three locations around the world.

AS Tallink Group is known to be using a BOQA solution, following successful trials in 2018.

== Literature ==
- NTSB Forum 25.-26.3.2914: Cruise Ships: Examining Safety, Operations and Oversight Forum, Capt. David Christie – Carnival Corporation Innovative Techniques to Enhance Safety
- OCIMF (Oil Companies International Marine Forum). Recommendations on the Proactive Use of Voyage Data Recorder Information (Ver 2).pdf
- AWS Public sector blog "Maritime Operations – Automating Operational Quality Assurance with AWS and Open Data"
