= 1987 South Africa floods =

Natural disaster in South Africa

- Date: September 25–29, 1987
- Location: South Africa (especially KwaZulu-Natal)
- Deaths: 506 confirmed
- Property damage: US$500 million

Floods in September 1987 became the deadliest natural disaster in the history of South Africa, with 506 fatalities.

A cut-off low moved across South Africa, fueled by moisture from the southeast. Over a five-day period beginning on September 25, parts of Natal province in eastern South Africa received as much as 900 mm (35 in) of rainfall. The heavy rainfall ended on September 29. Over three days, Mtunzini recorded 801 mm (31.5 in) of precipitation. The heaviest rainfall occurred in mountainous areas, causing landslides and flash floods, particularly in rivers. Water levels along the Umgeni River were so high that it washed away an entire island. The Mvoti River swelled to a width of 900 m (3,000 ft), from its normal width of 35 m (115 ft). There were a total of 506 fatalities related to the event. The floods damaged more than 30,000 houses, leaving more than 50,000 people homeless. Damage was estimated at US$500 million. 14 bridges were washed away. The floods destroyed four aqueducts serving the Durban metropolitan area, leaving people without water. Several rural villages were entirely destroyed. The floods also wrecked fields. Flooding of the Tugela River near the township of Mandini caused the loss of the John Ross Bridge, which was considered the largest infrastructure loss at the time and which was subsequently rebuilt in a record time of approximately 6 months at the behest of the South African government.

After the floods, officials discouraged drinking water due to the contamination of supply, The military airdropped pamphlets to residents how to purify their water.

== See also ==
- 2022 KwaZulu-Natal floods - deadly floods in 2022
