= June 2024 South African storm complex =

2024 deadly storm system affecting South Africa

Meteorological history
- Formed: 1 June 2024
- Dissipated: 5 June 2024

Cut-off low
- Max. rainfall: 200 mm (7.9 in)
- Max. snowfall: 30 cm (12 in)

EF3 tornado
- on the Enhanced Fujita scale
- Highest winds: 225 km/h (140 mph) to 265 km/h (165 mph)

Overall effects
- Fatalities: 23+
- Injuries: 55+
- Missing: 5+
- Evacuated: 2,500+
- Damage: US$344 million
- Areas affected: KwaZulu-Natal, Eastern Cape, Western Cape, Northern Cape

On 1–5 June 2024, a large storm system produced severely heavy rainfall and winds along the Eastern coast of South Africa, striking several municipalities in the Eastern Cape and KwaZulu-Natal provinces. The storm produced two tornadoes in Newcastle and Utrecht, with the more intense tornado striking oThongathi rated by the weather service at EF-3.

== Background ==
On 1 June 2024, South African Weather Service reported that South Africa was going under a cut-off low, which occurs when a low pressure system detaches from a jet stream. The agency predicted that it would stall over the Eastern coast of South Africa area for several days and produce heavy rain, severe winds, and a cold snap with the potential for hail.

On the same day, The South African Weather Service issued a Yellow Level 6 warning in areas of the Western Cape, KwaZulu-Natal, Northern Cape and Eastern Cape provinces, where they predicted flooding, snowfall, hail, and strong winds would occur.

== Impact ==
During the afternoon of 3 June 2024, the storm complex produced two tornados in the area surrounding the coastal port city of Durban that struck Newcastle, Utrecht and oThongathi (Tongaat). The first tornado developed in Northeastern KwaZulu-Nata between Newcastle and Utrecht, starting off as a rope tornado before developing into a cone tornado. The larger and stronger of the tornados formed near oThongathi later in the afternoon, and developed into a wedge tornado that moved eastwards towards the eastern coast between Desainagar and Seatides before dissipating. It caused the most severe damage in oThongathi, severely damaging several homes, felling trees, destroying power lines, and causing blackouts. At least 12 people were killed in KwaZulu-Natal province as a result of the tornadic storms system. More than 7,000 houses were damaged, 1,200 families became homeless. Damage of the system in the province reached R1.3 billion (US$68.6 million). There were reports of looting in Tongaat following the tornados.

The storm also produced significant rainfall and hailstorms that led to flooding that caused at least 11 deaths in Eastern Cape province. Over 2,000 people had to be evacuated from the Nelson Mandela Bay, many from makeshift homes in slums of the region. At least 55 people received mild to moderate injuries requiring hospital treatment. Red Cross noted that Nelson Mandela Bay and Buffalo City metropolitan areas suffered the worst flooding, with the heavy rainfall leading to dam breaches and overflowing canals. Damage from flooding was also reported in Sarah Baartman District Municipality, while the dam near Tyriville was at risk of collapsing. Buildings, sweer systems, roads, and water facilities, and electrical infrastructure was damaged across the Nelson Mandela Bay metro, while bridges were destroyed in Kwanobuhle. Damage in the province was estimated to be near R5.2 billion (US$275 million).

The rainfall and flooding caused significant damage to wheat and canola agriculture in the Overberg area due to the 200 mm rainfall over-saturating the ground, causing erosion, removing fertile top soil, and destroying roads and bridges that could allow farmers to reach their crops.

The cut-off low system caused temperatures to drop below 0°C (32°F) in five provinces of South Africa including Free State, leading to the first snowfall of the year in South Africa, of up to 30 cm (0.98 ft) across different regions.

== See also ==
- 2024 South Sudan floods
- 2022 KwaZulu-Natal floods
- 2022 Eastern Cape floods
- Cape storm (2017)
- Weather of 2024
