= 2022 KwaZulu-Natal floods =

April 2022 flooding in South Africa

2022 KwaZulu Natal floods
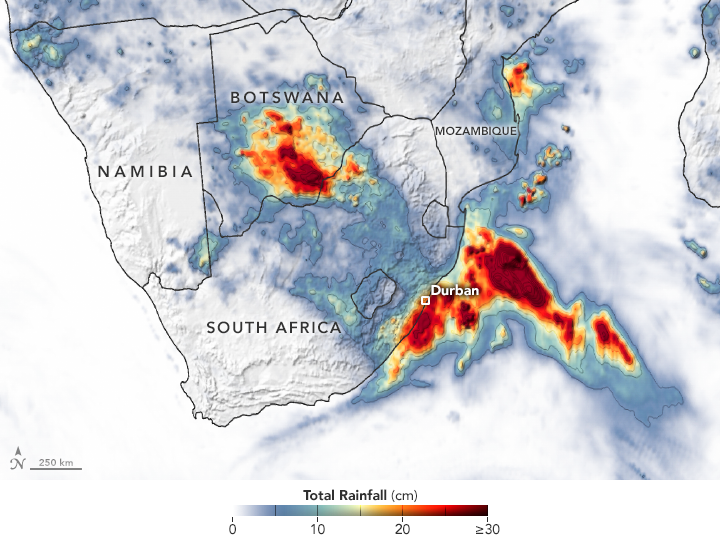
- Rainfall estimates across Southern Africa between 7 – 13 April 2022

Meteorological history
- Duration: 8 April 2022 – 21 April 2022

Flood
- Max. rainfall: 45 cm (17.72 in)

Overall effects
- Fatalities: 436
- Damage: R 17 billion
- Areas affected: South Africa (especially KwaZulu-Natal)
- Houses destroyed: 3,937

In April 2022, days of heavy rain across KwaZulu-Natal in southeastern South Africa led to deadly floods. Particularly hard-hit were areas in and around Durban. At least 436 people died across the province, with an unknown number of people missing as of April 22. Several thousand homes were damaged or destroyed. Critical infrastructure, including major roads, transportation, communication, and electrical systems, were also impacted by the flooding, and this damage greatly hampered recovery and relief efforts. It is one of the deadliest disasters in the country in the 21st century, and the deadliest storm since the 1987 floods. The floods have caused more than R17 billion (US$1.57 billion) in infrastructure damage. A national state of disaster was declared.

== Background and meteorological history ==
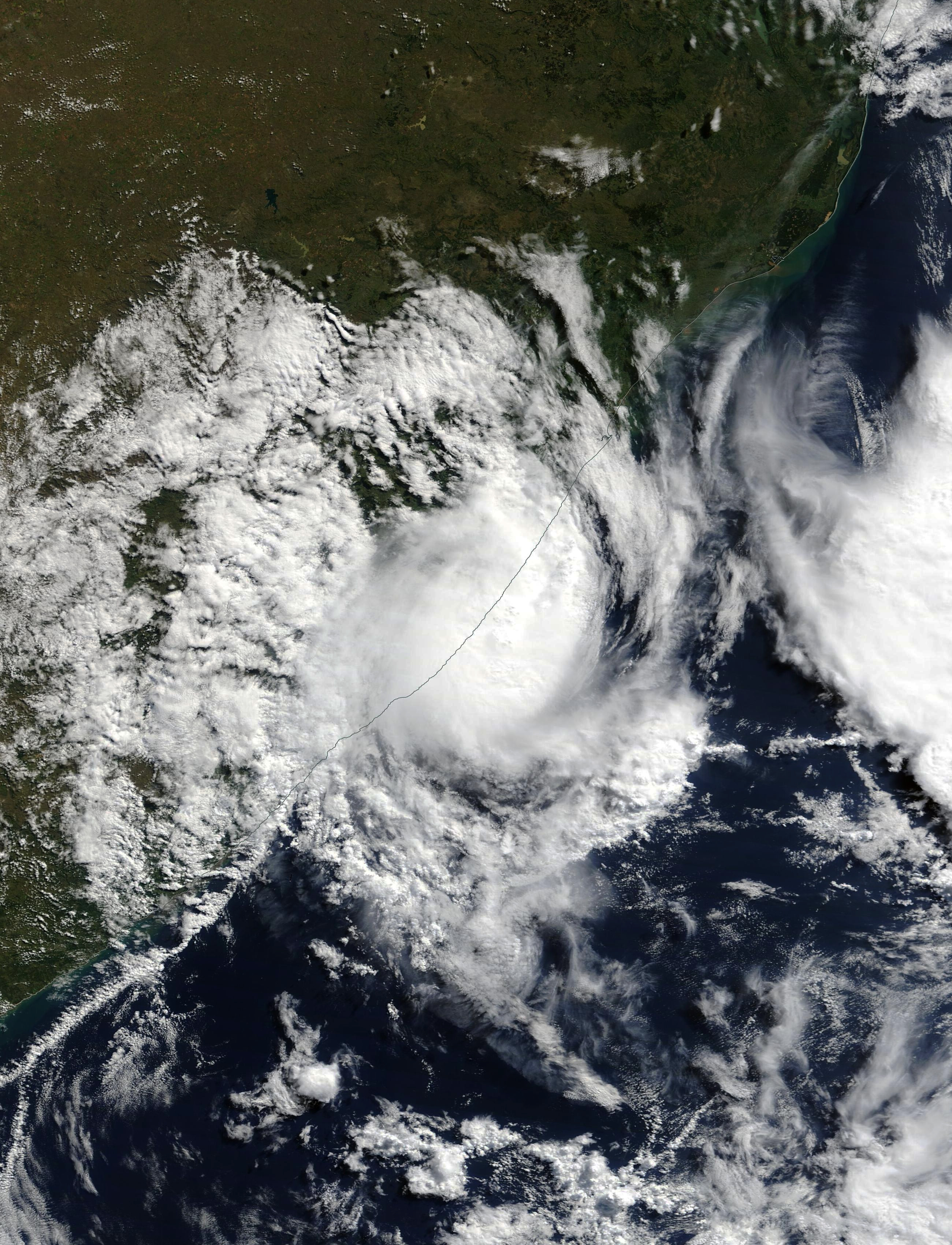
Subtropical Depression Issa on the 13 April

Owing to the effects of La Niña, South Africa has seen above-average precipitation in 2022. In January, many regions experienced their heaviest rains since reliable records began in 1921. Southern Africa as a whole experienced multiple devastating tropical cyclones and floods in the summer of 2021–22.

Heavy rainfall began around 8 April and persisted for days. On 11 April, a low pressure area evolved near the southeast coast of South Africa from the interaction of an upper-level trough and warmer air near the surface. With warm ocean temperatures and low wind shear, the low developed intense thunderstorms which wrapped around a tight circulation, and the South African Weather Service issuing a level 5 warning for the coast and adjacent interior of KwaZulu-Natal – which was subsequently changed to a level 8 and later a level 9 warning when the impact and scale of the rainfall was better understood. The clockwise flow of the low pressure system brought warm, moist air from the subtropics toward the coast, resulting in heavy rain across KwaZulu-Natal. The most intense precipitation fell in eThekwini, iLembe, and Ugu municipalities. During the period of 8–12 April, most of KwaZulu-Natal saw more than 50 mm (2.0 in) of rain, with coastal areas recording more than 200 mm (7.9 in). In a 24-hour period spanning 11–12 April, Virginia Airport recorded 304 mm (12.0 in) of precipitation. Areas along the coast of KwaZulu-Natal recorded 450 millimetres (18 in) of precipitation.

On 12 April, the low-pressure system was classified as a subtropical depression and designated Subtropical Depression Issa by Météo-France, due to its structure and presence of gale-force winds. Following its southwestern trajectory along the South African east coast and after reaching the northeastern coast of the Eastern Cape on the morning of 13 April, the system turned northward, continuing back along the South African east coast in a northeasterly direction before moving out to sea and further weakening.

== Impact ==
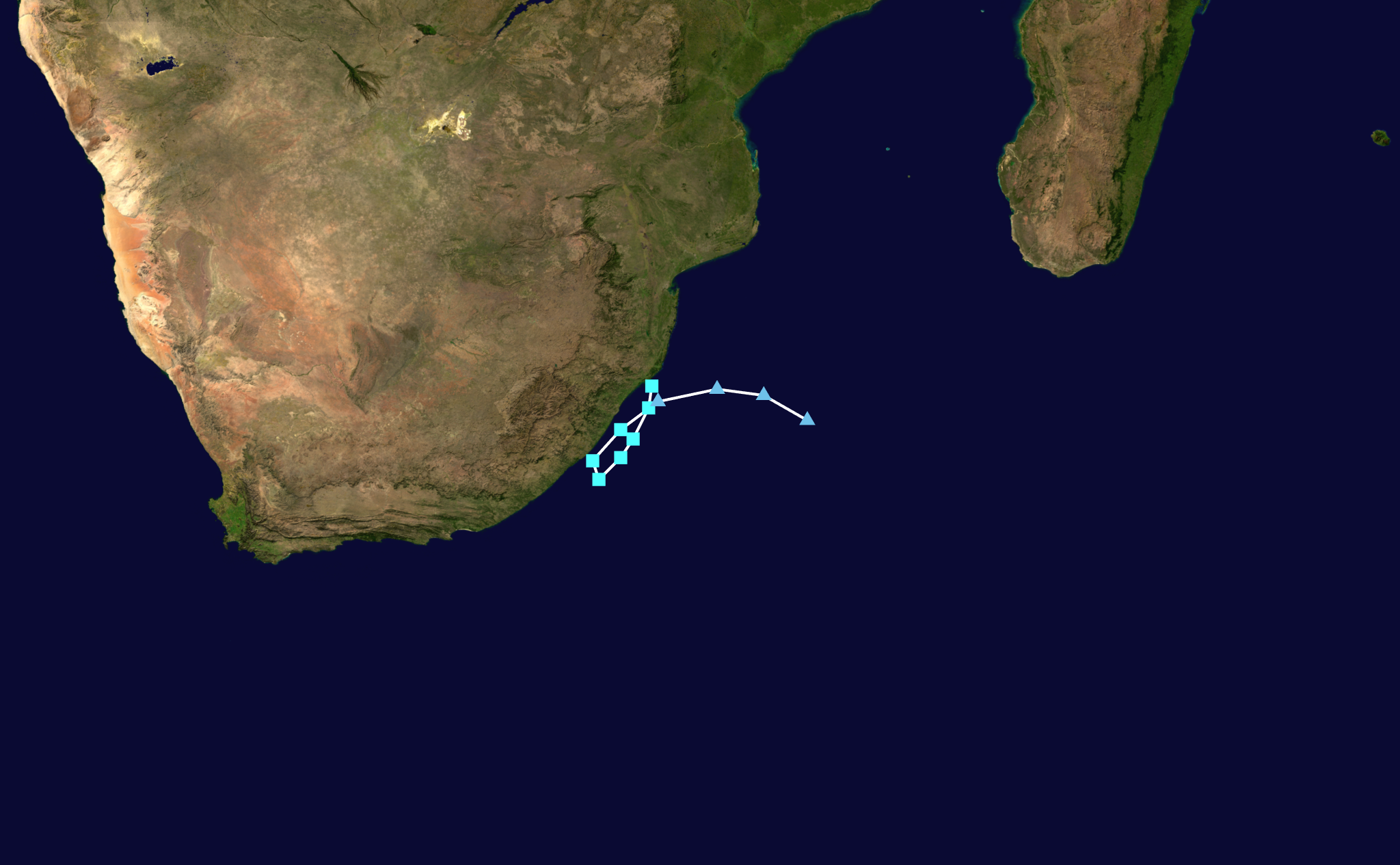
Map plotting the storm's track and intensity, according to the Saffir–Simpson scale Map key Saffir–Simpson scale Tropical depression (≤38 mph, ≤62 km/h) Tropical storm (39–73 mph, 63–118 km/h) Category 1 (74–95 mph, 119–153 km/h) Category 2 (96–110 mph, 154–177 km/h) Category 3 (111–129 mph, 178–208 km/h) Category 4 (130–156 mph, 209–251 km/h) Category 5 (≥157 mph, ≥252 km/h) Unknown Storm type Tropical cyclone Subtropical cyclone Extratropical cyclone, remnant low, tropical disturbance, or monsoon depression

The torrential rains destroyed dozens of homes, washed away roads, and triggered mudslides. On 13 April, it was announced that 59 people were killed across KwaZulu-Natal: 45 in eThekwini and 14 in iLembe. Later that day, the number of reported deaths due to the flooding was increased to 450. KwaZulu-Natal Premier Sihle Zikalala stated at least 2,000 homes and 4,000 shanty homes were damaged or destroyed. On the 21st of April, the death toll was revised downward to 435 after several deaths were discovered to be the result of murder and natural causes. Five people were killed in a shantytown near Clare Estate. A woman and three children were killed in oThongathi when their car was swept away by a swollen river. Two people died in Verulam when their home collapsed. Tragically a father and his daughter also lost their lives in Manors Pinetown on Charles Mowat Avenue when their home was completely washed away by a landslide. In Amanzimtoti on Andrew Zondo Road a house had also completely collapsed, no injuries were reported. There were also several landslide in the coastal town of EMdloti destroying homes and causing one side of an apartment building to collapse.

=== Communication ===
Damage occurred to the province's mobile phone infrastructure. Vodacom reported 400 towers impacted mostly by electricity outages, flooding and issues with flooded fibre conduiting. MTN claimed 500 sites were affected by flooding and power outages.

=== Education ===
Kwazi Mshengu, Member of the Executive Council (MEC) for Education in KZN announced that close to 300 rural and urban schools had been damaged in the storm. The department was still trying to repair damage to schools that had occurred in December 2021. Approximately 100 schools were damaged and 500 were closed throughout the province.

=== Energy and water ===
A hydroelectric dam operated by Eskom was overwhelmed by rising waters, rendering it inoperable. Eskom CEO Andre de Ruyter announced on 12 April that rolling blackouts would occur that evening due to issues in the network caused by the excessive rains. At their Drakensberg Pumped Storage Scheme facility, excessive debris on grids protecting the turbines needed clearing and on the Ingula Pumped Storage Scheme, both upper and lower dams were at full capacity and emptying the upper dam could result in flooding. Other issues in KwaZulu Natal were downed power lines and flooded substations.

Umgeni Water, the supplier of water to Durban and KZN, announced that two feeder lines were broken and these two aqueducts supplied water to the Durban Heights reservoir. Repairs were taking place. Water tankers were being used to supply areas without water supplies.

=== Infrastructure ===
Damage to infrastructure hampered relief efforts. Aerial support was requested from the South African National Defence Force to assist in recovery. Some looting of damaged shipping containers was reported at the Transnet port. The coastal N2 Highway suffered several washouts, with bridges destroyed. Southbound lanes of the N3 Highway, which connects Durban and Johannesburg, were closed due to flooding and debris. By the 13th of April, trucks were backlogged on the N3 South from the Mariannhill Toll Plaza back 10 km to Hammarsdale with minor looting taking place as they were unable to enter the port in Durban.

Transnet suspended port operations in Durban. This occurred in the early evening on the 11th of April, and a command centre made up of Transnet, customers and operators were set up to monitor activities at the port. The heavy rains then damaged the roads leading into the port and on the N3 leading to the city. Shipping into the port had also been suspended. Freight transport companies were told not to send transport cargo to Durban. At the Port of Richards Bay, terminals were operating but in a limited capacity.

Sappi closed three paper mills at Saiccor, Tugela and Stanger, leaving only two others functioning. A Pepkor distribution centre in Durban was closed due to flooding leaving two others in Johannesburg and Cape Town to assist the supply chain. The Amanzimtoti, Umbilo and Umgeni topped their banks, inundating surrounding communities. Shanty towns constructed along the banks of these rivers saw extensive damage. Extensive damage to Bayhead Road, the main access to fuel depots caused numerous petrol stations in KwaZulu-Natal to be without fuel. Major oil companies have also suspended all operations.

== Aftermath ==
On 12 April, after a late emergency meeting of the KwaZulu-Natal provincial executive council, Premier Sihle Zikalala called for a declaration of a state of disaster by the State so his province can access emergency funding. President Cyril Ramaphosa, attending a three-day summit of the Southern African Development Community (SADC) in Maputo, cut short his trip and returned to KwaZulu Natal on 13 April. President Cyril Ramaphosa visited families and local residents affected by the storm and floods in Lindelani, Ntuzuma, eMaoti and uMzinyathi. He was accompanied by KZN Premier Zikalala and Co-operative Governance and Traditional Affairs Minister Nkosazana Dlamini-Zuma as well as various mayors and provincial ministers.

On 13 April, a provincial state of disaster was classified in KwaZulu-Natal by the National Disaster Management Centre, specifically referencing the loss of life and damage to property, infrastructure, and the environment as reasons for the declaration.

Early assessments of the damage to the provincial roads in KwaZulu-Natal worth R5.7 billion were announced by transport minister Fikile Mbalula on 15 April. In other assessments, the Human Settlements Minister Mmamoloko Kubayi announced that 13,500 households had been affected by the storm, with over 3,927 houses destroyed and another 8,097 partly destroyed. R1 billion would be used to repair buildings and build temporary shelters.

Due to the heavy rain, communities downstream from two dams in KZN have been warned on 19 April about possible flooding as the dams had reached more than 80% capacity. Water was being released from the Ntshingwayo and Pongolapoort dams to reduce the capacities.

== See also ==
- 1987 South Africa floods — the deadliest floods on record in South Africa, killing 506 people
- 2022 Eastern Cape floods
- June 2024 South African storm complex
- List of deadliest floods
- Weather of 2022

== Literature ==
- Izidine Pinto et al.: Climate change-exacerbated rainfall causing devastating flooding in Eastern South Africa Online (PDF 2,3 MB), 13/05/2022
