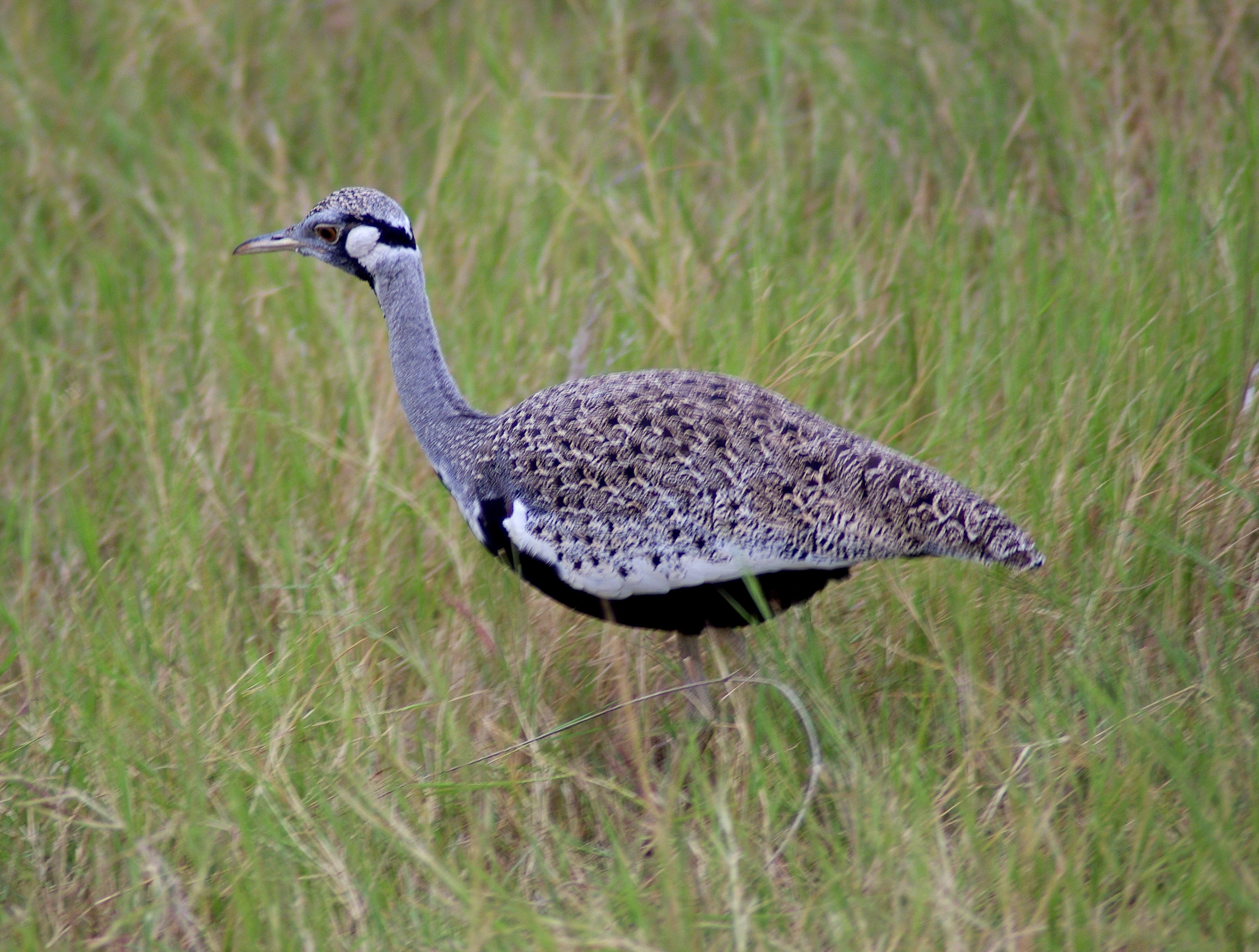
- Adult male

Conservation status
- Least Concern (IUCN 3.1)
- CITES Appendix II

Scientific classification
- Kingdom: Animalia
- Phylum: Chordata
- Class: Aves
- Order: Otidiformes
- Family: Otididae
- Genus: Lissotis
- Species: L. hartlaubii

Binomial name
- Lissotis hartlaubii (Heuglin, 1863)

= Hartlaub's bustard =

Species of bird

Hartlaub's bustard (Lissotis hartlaubii) is a species of bird in the family Otididae. It is a medium-sized bustard with a long, thick neck, and long legs. It is found in open, tall grassland, range from 1,600 to 2,000 metres (5,250 to 6,560 ft) in Ethiopia, Kenya, Somalia, Sudan, Tanzania, and Uganda.

The common name and Latin binomial commemorate the German physician and ornithologist Gustav Hartlaub. They initially classified under the genus Eupodotis in 1839, a subsequent genetic study revealed that the genus Lissotis represents a distinct, long-standing lineage, separate from Eupodotis, emerging during the evolutionary diversification of bustards at the generic level.

== Description ==
A mature Hartlaub's bustard is about 60 centimetres (24 in), recorded weights range from 1,500–1,600 g (3.3–3.5 lb). They are indistinguishable from a far distance, as they are similar to L. melanogaster. The male Hartlaub's bustard has a grayish coloration with a more distinct black stripe on its face, as well as a black stripe running down its neck that connects to its black belly. They have a small head set on a long neck, and a bulky body with large legs. The female is similar in appearance to the male, but with a cream-coloured head and hind neck with dark brown markings, a whitish belly and paler tail.

In flight, Hartlaub's bustard shows less black in the wings and a black rump.

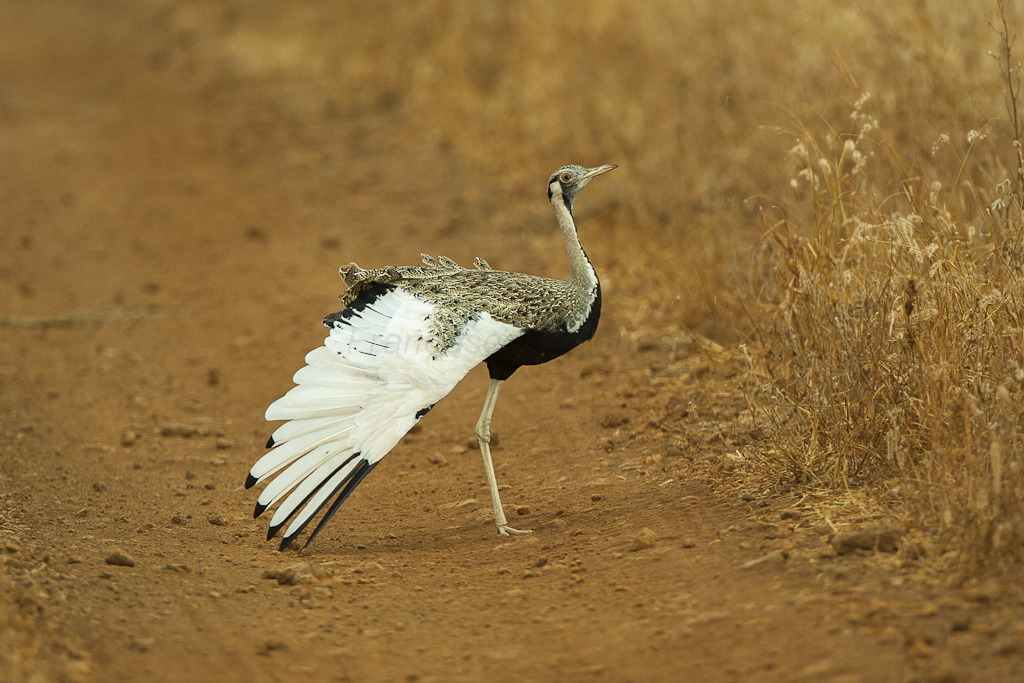
Hartlaub's bustard expands its wings, revealing a black rump.

== Distribution and habitat ==
The Hartlaub's bustard has a relatively restricted ranges within the Horn of Africa. They are sedentary and nomadic, can be found year-round in Ethiopia, SE Sudan and E South Sudan, NW & S Somalia, NE Uganda, NW & S Kenya and N Tanzania.

In general, they prefer different forms of "bush", which include light woodland, thorn country, high scrub and tall grass cover in dense savanna or on the fringes of water bodies. They can live in open, tall grassland with scattered Acacia at elevations up to 1,600 m (5,250 ft). In Kenya, they inhabit lower and drier environments compared to L. melanogaster, but in Ethiopia, they can be found at elevations up to 2,000 m (6,560 ft) in fields with Acacia and short-grass savanna.

== Behaviour and ecology ==
The Hartlaub's bustard exhibits a contrasting strategy compared to other species, having presumably attained a balance between improved concealment and the heightened risk of ambush. However, as a smaller bustard, it is more adept at making a rapid take-off in response to a close-range threat. They shows a certain level of sexual size dimorphism, that the female is proportionately smaller and lighter than the males.

Evidence indicates that the male Hartlaub's bustard exhibits a distinctive display flight, ascending steeply to a height of 15–20 m (49–66 ft) before gliding downward with its wings held in a shallow V and its legs trailing.

=== Breeding ===
The breed usually in rainy periods however it depends on the geography of the place. In Ethiopia, Hartlaub's bustard breed in April and in eats Africa. they breed around January to June. however the aerial display of breeding is recorded in November.

Male Hartlaub's bustard developed elongated filamentous breast plumes that are puffed up in display. The Hartlaub's bustard exhibits both terrestrial polygyny and lek polygyny. During copulation, the male repeatedly pecks at the female's head. Nest-site selection and incubation are solely the responsibility of the female.

The eggs are a matte olive-greenish brown, marked with distinct brown spots ranging from 4 to 6 mm in diameter, with a denser concentration of pigment at the pointed end. The incubation period lasts between 20 and 25 days. The chicks have creamy buff down, featuring both light and dark markings.

=== Food and feeding ===
They are omnivorous and highly opportunistic in their feeding habits, consuming both animals (invertebrates and small vertebrates) as well as vegetation.

=== Voice ===
By inflating and extending its neck, the male Hartlaub's bustard produces three distinct sounds: a rapid "click", followed by a "tok", and then a long, deep "booom". These sounds do not travel far.

== Conservation ==
The Hartlaub's bustard is a K-selected species, meaning it has a long lifespan and low reproductive output. With a generation length of 10.3 years, its long generation time and restricted range make monitoring the species challenging and difficult to sustain.

Hartlaub's Bustard is not considered globally threatened, classified as a species of 'Least Concern' under CITES Appendix II. However, bustard populations are generally in decline, largely due to habitat loss caused by agricultural intensification, hunting, and other forms of environmental modification. The global population size of Hartlaub's bustard remains unknown, as the species is rare and primarily found in localized areas of Africa. In the absence of significant evidence of population decline or major threats, the population is currently suspected to be stable.
