= S.A. John Ross =

South African tugboat and salvage ship

History

South Africa
- Owner: SAF Marine; Pentow Marine; Smit Pentow; Smit Dudula
- Builder: John Brown & Hamer Ltd.
- Yard number: 29
- Laid down: March 18, 1974
- Launched: March 25, 1975
- Acquired: November 8, 1976
- Home port: Cape Town
- Identification: IMO number: 7385215; MMSI number: 601524000
- Status: Active

General characteristics
- Type: Salvage tug
- Tonnage: 2,918 GT; tbc NT; 2,146 DWT
- Length: 94.65 m (310 ft 6 in)
- Beam: 15.85 m (52 ft 0 in)
- Draught: 7.52 m (24 ft 8 in)
- Depth: 8.6 m (28 ft 3 in)
- Propulsion: Main engines: 2 x 16 cyl. Mirrlees-Blackstone KVMR16 (total 19,200 bhp (14,300 kW)); Bow thruster: 1 × 800 kW (1,073 hp)
- Speed: approx. 21 knots (39 km/h; 24 mph)

S.A. John Ross (also known as John Ross, SA Amandla, Smit Amandla and Iconic 09) along with her sister ship S.A. Wolraad Woltemade, was one of a pair of South African ocean-going salvage tugs built in the late 1970s in order to support passage of redirected (in particular supertankers) traffic around the Cape of Good Hope as a result of the closure of the Suez Canal following the Six-Day War.

For a time after their construction, the tugs held the record for the most powerful marine salvage vessels of their type in the world. The S.A. John Ross was named after the Scotsman Charles Maclean, who during his exploits during the Anglo-Zulu war became known as "John Ross".

== Design ==
The S.A. John Ross was designed jointly by the Robb Caledon Shipyard and the Arnesen Christensen marine engineering office in Oslo, and included a deckhouse located three-quarters forward and a long aft working deck. Winches were housed in the rear part of the superstructure and were designed for a maximum bollard pull of 205 tonnes and a static load of up to 320 tonnes.

During construction, the aft working area was equipped with a rear double mast and working boom with a lifting capacity of 30 tonnes. This was later removed for stability reasons and replaced by an electro-hydraulic crane. The propulsion system consisted of two Mirrlees Blackstone 16-cylinder four-stroke diesel engines of Type 16 KVR Major with a combined output of over 14,000 kilowatts (19,000 hp). The two engines were connected to a single drive shaft via gearbox, equipped with a variable pitch propeller and slotted nozzle. After a grounding incident, the vessel sailed nozzle-less until the fitting of a Lips nozzle in 1979. In addition, four MAK auxiliary diesel engines rated at 740 kW each and one auxiliary diesel were included. Mooring and undocking maneuvers were supported by an 800 kW (1,100 hp) bow thruster.

== History ==
The S.A John Ross was laid down at the Elgin Brown & Hamer shipyard in Durban in March 1974 in response to the closure of the Suez Canal and the potential need to provide support to shipping lines which had consequently begun switching to the use of supertankers (aka Ultra Large Crude Carriers (ULCC)) capable of carrying cargo around the Cape and in so doing avoiding potential disruptions. In addition, the stranding of the tanker SS Wafra off Cape Agulhas in 1971 and its subsequent re-floating by the passing powerful German tug Oceanic, led to the realization by the South African authorities that the local harbour tugs available in local ports at the time would be insufficient for any such future operations, and that purpose built ocean going tugs would be needed in the future.

The S.A. John Ross and her sister ship were custom designed for service along the unpredictable waters off South Africa and at the time represented the first government subsidized maritime Emergency Towing Service in the world, a model which was quickly emulated by many countries thereafter. Their robust design and significant power designed to allow them to operate on the South African coast made them more than capable for other operation around the globe and for a time earned them the title of the most powerful vessels of their kind in the world - a record held until the launching of the Russian salvage tugs Fotiy Krylov and Nikolay Chiker in 1989. Due to her large displacement and deep draft, the S.A. John Ross was known for its excellent sea-keeping characteristics and due to her hull design and single propeller configuration, her mobilization time and speed were superior to all vessels in her class, to the extent that in 2016, some 40 years after her initial sea trials, she was still officially classed as the fastest salvage tug in the world.

The tugs soon came to be an integral part of maritime towing operations, undertaking dozens of emergency towing and salvage operations both locally along the South African coast as well as internationally. After reopening of the Suez Canal, the tug conducted many long distance tows as part of the Global Towing Alliance. One such example of the John Ross's exploits was the successful towing of the rig Period 77 through the Straits of Magellan in winds of up to 110 knots in August 1984. Initially operated by SAF Marine which evolved into Pentow Marine, the "S.A." prefix was dropped. Thereafter when the Dutch operator Smit became a partner in Pentow, which then became Smit Dudula, the John Ross was renamed in 2003 to Smit Amandla.

== Legacy ==
At the time of their design, the John Ross and the Wolraad Woltemade established a new standard for large, powerful, trans-ocean going salvage vessels, and their development led directly to the creation and implementation of the Emergency Standby Towing Vessel concept - a first by the South African authorities and one which was subsequently implemented by many other countries globally.

In addition to her numerous salvage operations, the John Ross is estimated to have prevented countless potentially devastating pollution incidents over the course of her history. The John Ross was also involved in numerous anti-poaching and conservation efforts, both locally in South Africa as well as in conjunction with foreign agencies.
