= Nathaniel Isaacs =

English adventurer (1808–1872)

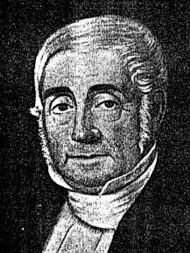
Image of Isaacs' uncle, Saul Solmon

Nathaniel Isaacs (1808–1872) was an English adventurer who played an important part in the history of Natal, South Africa. He wrote a memoir spread over two volumes (whose accuracy is often disputed) called Travels and Adventures in Eastern Africa (1836). This book subsequently became one of the principal sources quoted by writers of the history of Natal, including Morris (The Washing of the Spears: The Rise and Fall of the Zulu Nation), Ritter (Shaka Zulu: The Rise of the Zulu Empire) and Bulpin (Natal and the Zulu Country). US-based scholar Adam Rovner discovered strong archival support for many of Isaacs' claims and in 2025 published his research in the first comprehensive biography of Isaacs (The Jew Who Would Be King: A True Story of Shipwreck, Survival, and Scandal in Victorian Africa).

== Early life ==
Isaacs was born in Canterbury, England, into a Jewish family. His father was a shoemaker and his mother was Lenie (Elizabeth) Solomon, daughter of Nathaniel Solomon of Margate and Phoebe Mitz who came from the Netherlands. Several years after his father died, Isaacs sailed (1822) to join his maternal uncle, Saul Solomon Sr., a merchant based in Jamestown on the island of St. Helena. His cousin, Saul Solomon Jr., later became an influential liberal politician of the Cape Colony. In June 1825 Isaacs persuaded his uncle to allow him to accompany "Lieutenant" James King, captain of the brig The Mary to South Africa. After the brig had discharged its cargoes in Cape Town, King sailed for Port Natal to search for the merchant-adventurers Francis Farewell and Francis Fynn, from whom nothing had been heard for sixteen months.

== Stranded in Natal ==
Leaving Cape Town on 26 August 1825, The Mary anchored off Port Natal on 1 October. On entry to the port, The Mary foundered when she struck a sandbank during a gale.

On reaching shore, the party found Farewell's camp, but Farewell and his party were absent on a hunting expedition. King and Isaacs learned that Farewell and other Europeans with him maintained good relations with the Zulu and neighboring peoples. On November 29, 1825 Isaacs set off to accompany James King on a visit to the Zulu king Shaka, who had provided cattle to the Europeans who had washed up on the shores of his realm.

Isaacs records his impressions of the Zulu people and their customs, which are particularly interesting as they are an account of the Zulu people before they came under European influence. He lived in daily contact with the Zulu and met regularly with the powerful King Shaka. At the time, the Zulu Empire was expanding its influence in the eastern portions of Southern Africa. Isaacs was treated on the whole with favour by Shaka and the Zulu. At one point, Isaacs fought in the ranks of Shaka's warriors to dislodge an enemy tribe. Isaacs was wounded in that battle and afterward was rewarded with rank and honours, as well as a large tract of land abutting what is now Durban. Isaacs was made an "induna incoola"--a principal chieftain or headman--under Shaka, and he was given the praise name uDambuza mtabate ("off he goes at speed").

Most of what has been written about Shaka comes from the accounts of Henry Francis Fynn and Isaacs, both of whom learned to speak isiZulu. Fynn's reminiscences were mistakenly buried and then recomposed decades after Shaka's assassination in 1828. They were not published until 1950. In contrast, Isaacs' contemporary account appeared in England within a decade of Shaka's death and thus helped forge the legend of the great Zulu King.

James King, Farewell, Fynn and Isaacs established the settlement that grew into the town of Port Natal, later renamed Durban, which became the second largest city in South Africa in modern times.

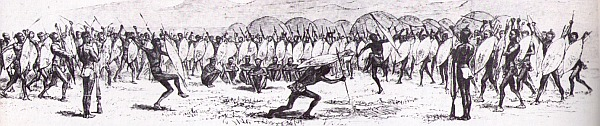
Reception of the Zooloos for Chaka''

== Subsequent career ==
Isaacs left Natal in 1831, when Shaka's successor, half-brother, and assassin, Dingane, was thought to be preparing to massacre the few Europeans living on the edge of his kingdom.

In 1844 Isaacs abandoned his claim to the land granted him by Shaka and settled in Sierra Leone. From a base in Freetown, he built up a thriving business. Later, Isaacs purchased Matakong Island in today's Guinea and established a modern port, private army, and commercial base. He ruled Matakong with the consent of local kings and became a regional power-broker. However, in 1854 he was accused of slave-trading by Sierra Leone's governor, Sir Arthur Kennedy. Isaacs got wind of his impending arrest thanks to an informant--the son of his Eurafrican lover--who worked in the Governor's own secretariat. Isaacs was able to flee Matakong and avoid arrest. He made his way back to England and there orchestrated a campaign to clear his name. When Kennedy was appointed Governor of New South Wales, Australia, and recalled to London, he took with him the sworn testimony relating to the slave-trading charges against Isaacs. The documents were lost when the ship in which he was travelling, the Forerunner was wrecked off Madeira in October 1854.

In the absence of the testimony, the English courts refused to proceed with the prosecution. Isaacs was free to return to operate his lucrative Matakong port. Later, Isaacs retired to Liverpool, where he was to spend the last years of his life with one of his daughters and her family.

Isaacs died on 26 Jun 1872 in Egremont, on the opposite side of the Mersey from Liverpool. His body was transported several hundred miles and buried in the Canterbury Jewish Cemetery.

== Historians' commentary ==
In recent years many academics have questioned the accuracy of Isaac's writings. Dan Wylie, an academic at Rhodes University has asserted that Isaacs deliberately exaggerated the extent of Shaka's brutality to boost the sales of his and of Fynn's books. Other historians though were quick to challenge Wylie. Petros Sibani, a historian and tour guide of Zulu battlefields, said there was no doubting Shaka "was a cruel and ruthless man but they were cruel and ruthless times".

Another historian, Stephen Gray, also questioned the accuracy of Isaacs's writings. In his commentary on the articles by Charles Rawden Maclean originally published in 1853-54 in The Nautical Magazine, he notes that Maclean made no mention of Isaacs at all. He also conjectures that it was Isaacs who gave Maclean the name "John Ross" because he could not remember Maclean's real name. Gray is scathing of Isaacs to the extent that when comparing the writings of the two men he wrote "The differences between Maclean's and Isaacs' accounts [of Shaka's brutality] are so glaring that one is forced to ask which of the two is plain lying." Gray neglects to note that in June 1853 Maclean described Shaka as "the Napoleon of Eastern Africa, before whom every one was prostrated. A hundred thousand warriors, whose victories had annihilated nations, and had fought in fields saturated with the blood of their slain comrades, knelt at his feet, and to them his words were as the mandate of their deity."

Author and academic Adam Rovner (University of Denver) conducted research in London, Jamestown (St. Helena), Cape Town, Durban, Freetown, and on Matakong Island and concluded that while Isaacs may have exaggerrated some of the horrors perpetrated by King Shaka, indigenous informants quoted in The James Stuart Archive of Recorded Oral Evidence Relating to the History of the Zulu often referred to Shaka's cruelty, and that the extant archival record significantly supports Isaacs' claims, timeline, and observations.

== Published works ==
- Travels and Adventures in Eastern Africa, Descriptive of the Zoolus, Their Manners, Customs, Etc. Etc. with a Sketch of Natal. Vol. I. London: E. Churton. 1836a.
- Travels and adventures in eastern Africa, descriptive of the Zoolus, their manners, customs, etc. etc. with a sketch of Natal. Vol. II. London: E. Churton. 1836b. OL 6956051M.
