= Ntshingwayo Dam =

- Interactive map of Ntshingwayo Dam
- Official name: Ntshingwayo Dam
- Country: South Africa
- Location: KwaZulu-Natal
- Coordinates: 28°00′S 29°55′E
- Opening date: 1961
- Owner: Department of Water Affairs

Dam and spillways
- Type of dam: Arch-gravity dam
- Impounds: Ingagane River
- Height: 23 m
- Length: 1 677 m

Reservoir
- Creates: Ntshingwayo Dam Reservoir
- Total capacity: 211 258 000 m^{3}
- Catchment area: 834 km^{2}
- Surface area: 3 610.1 ha

Ntshingwayo Dam (previously known as Chelmsford Dam) is a combined gravity and arch type dam located on the Ingagane River in South Africa. It was established in 1961 and serves mainly for municipal and industrial use. The hazard potential of the dam has been ranked high (3). The dam is enclosed in the Chelmsford Nature Reserve.

== See also ==
- List of reservoirs and dams in South Africa
