= Traffic separation scheme =

Maritime traffic-management system

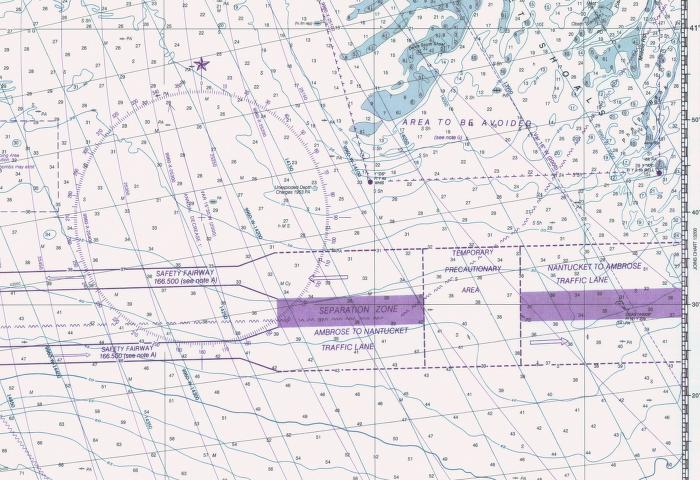
Example of a TSS on a chart

A traffic separation scheme or TSS is a maritime traffic-management route-system ruled by the International Maritime Organization or IMO. It consists of two (outer) lines, two lanes, and a separation zone. The traffic-lanes (or clearways) indicate the general direction of the ships in that lane; ships navigating within a lane all sail in the same direction or they cross the lane in an angle as close to 90 degrees as possible.

TSSs are used to regulate the traffic at busy, confined waterways or around capes. Within a TSS there is normally at least one traffic-lane in each main-direction, turning-points, deep-water lanes and separation zones between the main traffic lanes. Most TSS include 'inshore traffic zones' between the (outer) lines and the coast. The inshore traffic zone is unregulated and is not intended to be used for through traffic but rather for local traffic, fishing and small craft. A ship navigating in a traffic-lane should sail in the general direction of that lane. The body of water between two opposite lanes is named separation zone and is to be avoided by vessels travelling within the TSS as far as possible except in certain circumstances such as emergencies or for fishing activities. Where needed there are special zones where a lane splits into two channels: one ongoing and the other to the nearby port(s).

The TSS rules are incorporated in the International Regulations for Preventing Collisions at Sea (Under Part B, Section I, Rule 10- Traffic Separation Schemes), SOLAS V/10 and the General Provisions on Ships' Routeing (GPSR).

An individual TSS is controlled by a vessel traffic service.

== Objectives ==
Objectives of IMO Routeing Schemes:

1. Help reduce and manage head on situations for the streams of opposing traffic
2. Help manage crossing situation arising while entering or coming out of port
3. In areas of offshore activities, directives regarding safe distance from the installations
4. Providing routes for deep draught vessels
5. Avoiding presence of routine traffic from some areas as desired by administration
6. Better management of inshore traffic zone, fishing zones and areas dangerous to navigation due to presence of isolated dangers and shoal patches in a high density traffic area.

== Crossing ==
Top: Without current Bottom: Strong current from the left

If a ship wants to cross a traffic-lane it should do so at a right angle to avoid endangering ship traffic using the traffic-lanes (although traffic in the lane does not automatically have the right-of-way). To minimize the amount of time a crossing ship spend crossing the traffic-lanes, there should be a right angle between the lane direction and the keel direction – even if currents might shift the actual direction of the ship's movement to some angle other than 90 degrees.

== Locations ==
TSSs are used in locations where there is a lot of traffic (busy shipping areas) where not regulating the traffic would lead to more accidents. In Europe, many TSS areas are found around the Southern part of the North Sea including the English Channel. Other TSSs are in place off Land's End and around Ouessant (Ushant).

Well-known TSS locations include the English Channel, German Bight, Singapore, and Cape Horn. The Dover Strait/Détroit du Pas de Calais was the first International Maritime Organisation (IMO) approved traffic separation scheme in the world commencing operation in 1967, and becoming mandatory in 1977. Other TSS areas can be found in the Mediterranean Sea, western side of the Atlantic Ocean and the Pacific.

== See also ==
- Oswego-Guardian/Texanita collision
- Vessel traffic service
