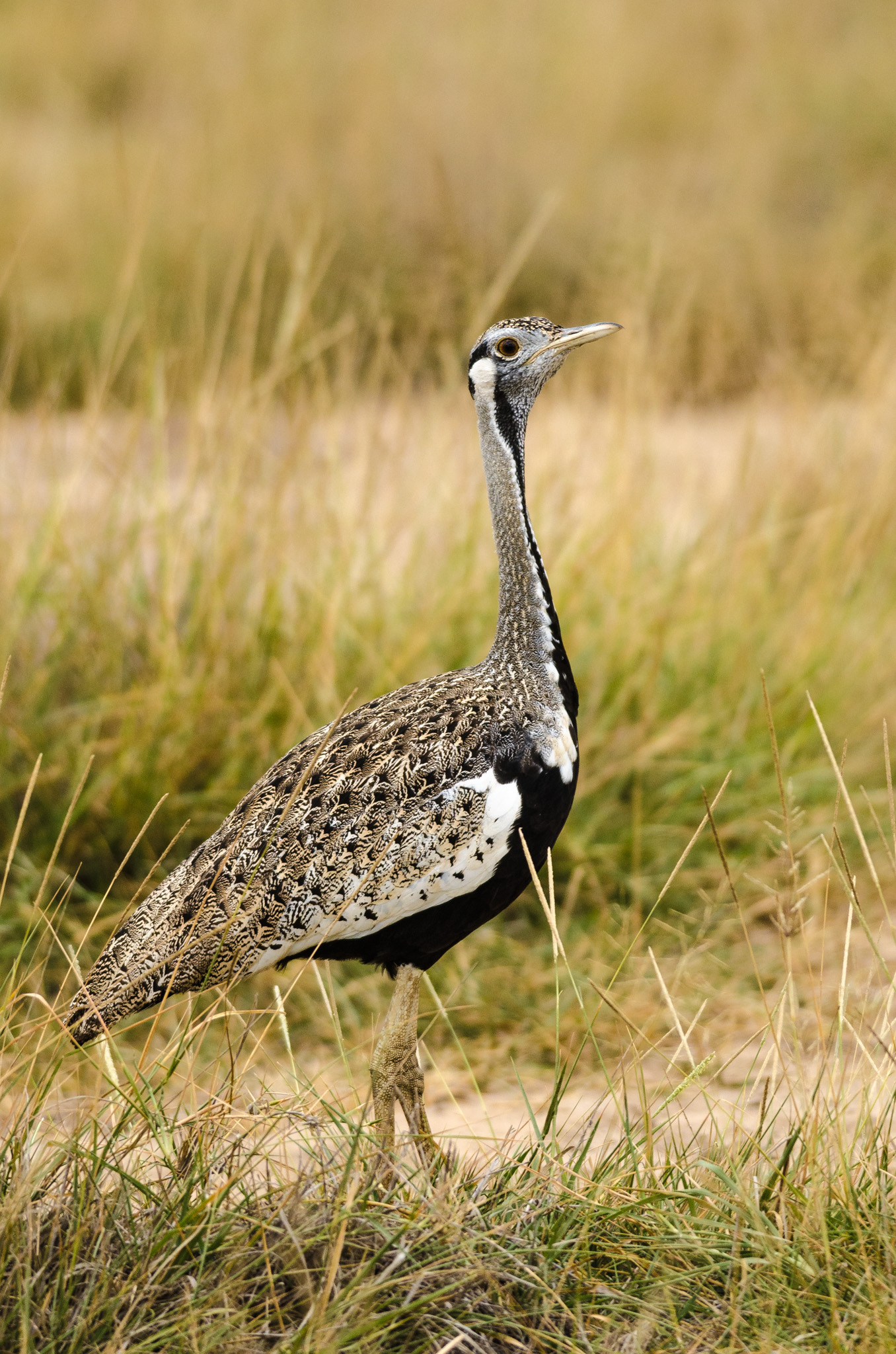
- Male

Conservation status
- Least Concern (IUCN 3.1)
- CITES Appendix II

Scientific classification
- Kingdom: Animalia
- Phylum: Chordata
- Class: Aves
- Order: Otidiformes
- Family: Otididae
- Genus: Lissotis
- Species: L. melanogaster

Binomial name
- Lissotis melanogaster (Rüppell, 1835)
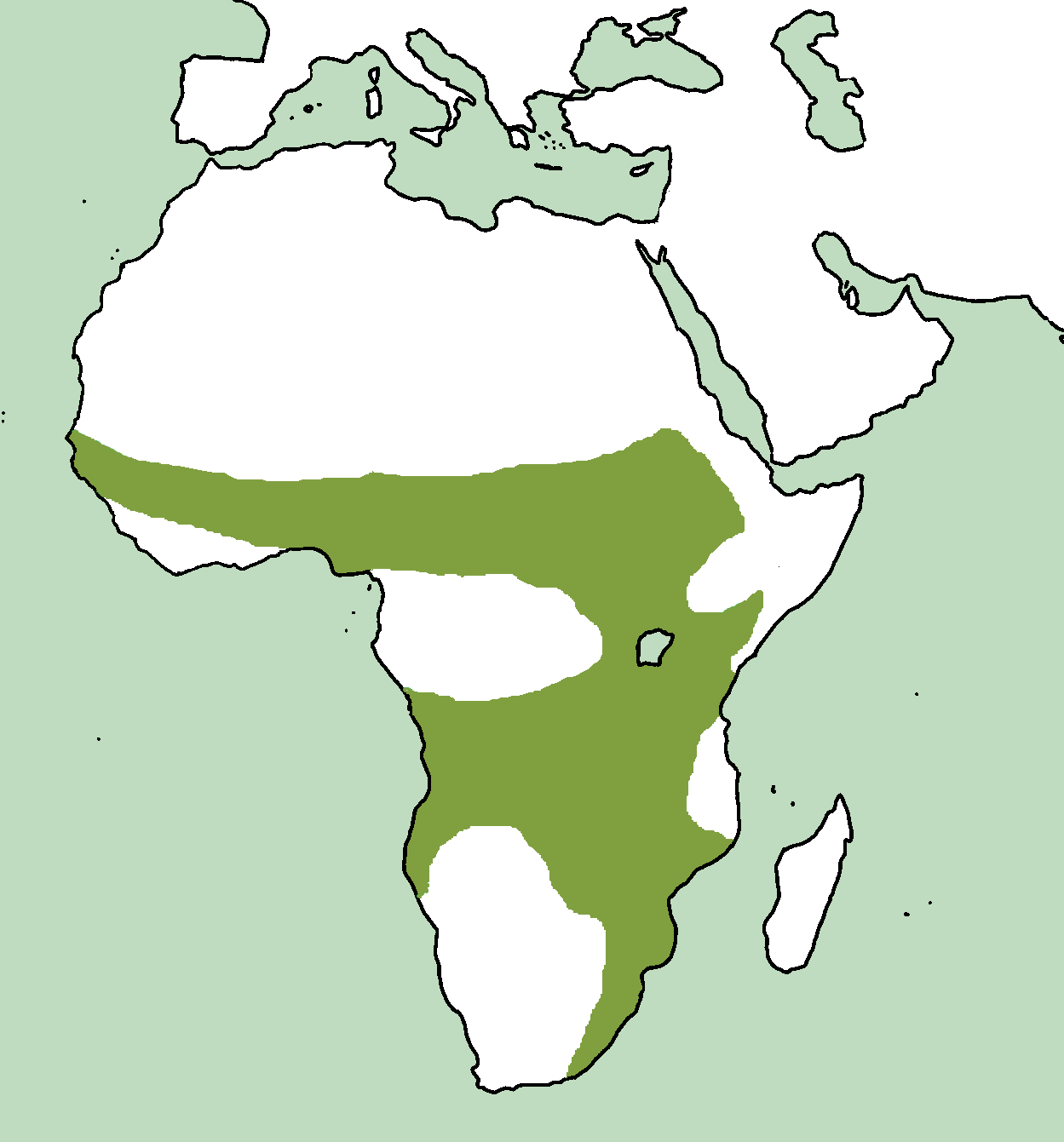
- resident range

= Black-bellied bustard =

Species of bird

The black-bellied bustard (Lissotis melanogaster), also known as the black-bellied korhaan, is an African ground-dwelling bird in the bustard family Otididae. It is native to Africa and does not migrate.

== Description ==
The black-bellied bustard is 58–65 cm (23–26 in) long. The bill and legs are dull yellow. The male's upperparts have black and brown marks on a tawny buff background; the underparts are black. The head is boldly patterned with black, white and buff. The neck, long and thin for a bustard, is buffy brown with a thin black line down the front that joins the black breast. The tail is brown and buff with four or five narrow dark brown bands. The upper surface of the wings is white with a brown triangle at the base; the flight feathers have black tips except for the outer secondary feathers. The white of the wings is visible when the bird stands, contrasting with the black underparts. The tail feathers are ashy brown, with four to five blackish bars and coarse vermiculation. The crown and hindneck are sandy buff with black vermiculation. The lores and eyebrows are slaty grey, with a narrow black line topped by a fainter white line running from each eye to meet at the nape. The male has a broad black line running down the centre of the throat, bordered on each side by a white band. The bill has a dark brown culmen, and the iris is light brown.

The female is plain buff, cryptically marked with darker brown mottling on the back and vermiculation on the neck and breast. The juvenile is duller and darker, with a dark grey crown and buff spots on the wing. The neck and rump patterns of both sexes, the male's white chin and lores, and the female's vermiculations are points that distinguish this species from its close relative, Hartlaub's bustard.The female has similar features to the male but lacks the black coloration on the head, neck and underparts. Her chin is white rather than greyish.

The sexes are similar in length, but males weigh about 60% more than females and have wings about 8% longer.

The black-bellied bustard lives 7.8 years on average and up to 18.3 years at most.

== Taxonomy ==
The black-bellied bustard was first described by the German naturalist Eduard Rüppell in 1835 as Otis melanogaster. It was later placed in the genus Eupodotis, and in 1848 the German ornithologist Ludwig Reichenbach transferred it to Lissotis. Its currently accepted scientific name is Lissotis melanogaster.

Its closest relative, and the only other member of its genus, is Hartlaub's bustard (Lissotis hartlaubii). Two subspecies are recognized: L. m. melanogaster and L. m. notophila. The species is thought to have speciated about 5.2 million years ago.

== Etymology ==
The genus name Lissotis is derived from the Ancient Greek words lissos, meaning "smooth" or "plain", and ōtis, meaning "bustard". The specific epithet melanogaster also comes from Ancient Greek, combining melas, meaning "black", and gastēr, meaning "belly". The name refers to the black underparts of the male bird.

The English common name "bustard" originates from the Old French "bistarde". Its proposed Latin origin is "avis tarda", meaning "slow bird", although this explanation is considered uncertain and may be an example of folk etymology.

The common name "korhaan" originates from Dutch korhaan or knorhaan, a name originally used for the male black grouse. It is composed of korren, meaning "to coo", and haan, meaning "cock" or "rooster", referring to the bird's vocalizations. The name was later transferred to several African bustard species.

== Habitat and distribution ==
The black-bellied bustard is distributed across East, West, Southwest and Central Africa. This species is also found in the areas of South Africa, Zimbabwe, Botswana and some areas of Tanzania and Nigeria. It prefers higher rainfall than Hartlaub's bustard and in many areas occurs only following heavy rain. The subspecies differ in their geographic distribution: L. m. melanogaster is found across western and eastern Africa, reaching as far south as Angola and Mozambique, whereas L. m. notophila is restricted to southeastern Africa, including parts of Zimbabwe and South Africa. It is found in savanna, cultivated fields and tall open grassland in sub-Saharan Africa. The species also inhabits moist grasslands, floodplains and lightly cultivated areas. It is particularly associated with tall grass and sedge-dominated vegetation, which provides cover, especially around wetlands and seasonal pans. It generally avoids dense woodland and arid deserts, although it may also occur in bushy savannas and fallow farmland. Its local movements are influenced by rainfall and grass height, and it may temporarily leave areas affected by overgrazing or burning. When disturbed, it often remains motionless in tall vegetation, making it difficult to detect.

== Behaviour ==
=== Vocalization ===
In courtship display the male retracts his head to his back, giving "a short rising wheezy whistle, zhweeeeee", pauses in that position, and slowly raises his head, giving "a popping quock or plop followed by soft gurgling". The initial "nyah" call lasts approximately 0.25 seconds, with a fundamental frequency rising from 200 to 400 Hz and the fourth harmonic being the most prominent. After a pause of approximately three seconds, the male produces a low growl lasting about 0.4 seconds, immediately followed by a brief, upward-slurred "pwok" lasting approximately 0.04 seconds, with a frequency rising from roughly 300 to 2,000 Hz. The male calls mainly around dawn and dusk, and often on moonlit nights.

=== Diet ===
This is an omnivorous bird mainly feeding on invertebrates like beetles, grasshopper, cockroach, ants and some other small insects. Their diet also includes some vegetables, fruits like berries, flowers, seeds and green leaves. In addition to beetles, grasshoppers, cockroaches and ants, its recorded invertebrate prey includes crickets, caterpillars, termites, mantids, bugs (Hemiptera), cicadas, ant-lions, wasps and centipedes. Its recorded plant foods also include palm kernels. In feeding habits it resembles other bustards.

=== Reproduction ===
Black-bellied bustards are polygynous, solitary nesters that use an exploded lek mating system, in which males display to attract several females and mate with them afterwards. The courtship display includes both aerial and ground calls, and the aerial display is a non-acrobatic high flight. Males have been seen performing display flights in September at sites where the birds are present year-round, which suggests that breeding likely takes place there. The egg-laying season runs from about September to March, and nesting has been recorded in January. The nest is a shallow scrape on bare ground, often among tufts of tall grass and usually near a feature such as an anthill, a bush, or water. The female lays one or two eggs and incubates them alone. The chicks hatch with brown and black down and are cared for by the mother, who chases away intruders such as warthogs if they come too close to her young.

== Conservation status ==
The black-bellied bustard is classified as Least Concern by the IUCN and is listed under CITES Appendix II, although its overall population size remains unknown. Its numbers have decreased in Senegal and Gambia since 1980, but it remains relatively common across the savannas of northern Ivory Coast, Ghana, Nigeria, and Sudan. The species is particularly widespread and abundant in Uganda, Tanzania, and Zambia, although hunting may have contributed to population declines in Zambia. In Zimbabwe, it remains fairly numerous, but overgrazing by livestock has caused local declines. It is also the most common bustard in southern Mozambique. In South Africa, the species is vulnerable to the loss of tall grassland resulting from agricultural intensification.
