= Oswego-Guardian–Texanita collision =

1972 maritime incident in South Africa

Coordinates: 34.80°S 21.40°E

The Oswego-Guardian–Texanita collision was a maritime accident between two supertankers near Stilbaai, South Africa on 21 August 1972. The Texanita exploded and sank with the loss of 47 men, while a further life was lost on the Oswego Guardian. The accident was a catalyst for change to marine traffic separation procedures as well as oil tanker inerting.

== Accident ==
Western Cape, South Africa

The Oswego-Guardian was rounding the southern tip of Africa, fully loaded with crude oil from the Middle East, while the Texanita was in ballast, and headed in the opposite direction from Trinidad to Ras Tanura. Both ships were approximately 100,000 tons deadweight and registered in Liberia. The ships collided in dense fog off Stilbaai, near Cape Agulhas. The oil vapours in the Texanita's two empty tanks ignited, creating a massive explosion that tore the ship apart, causing it to sink in four minutes with the loss of 47 of its 50 crew; the explosion was heard 63 miles (101 km) away, inland from the coast.

On August 22, The New York Times reported that "not much" oil had leaked from the site of the incident and serious shore pollution was not expected. Captain Salvourdas (the master of the Texanita), a crewman, Vasilos Tanos, and an unidentified Chinese messman from the Oswego Guardian were taken to a hospital in Mossel Bay.

Roughly 10,000 tonnes of crude oil and fuel oil were spilled, and an estimated 500 African penguins were oiled by the slick.

A United Nations resolution that would have made the use of inert gas safety systems mandatory for oil tankers, was still in draft in 1972. Experts believe that were the Texanita inerted, her fate might have been less tragic, possibly like that of the Venoil.

The subsequent investigation determined that the masters of both ships failed to maintain an adequate lookout or to plot the course of the opposite ship; both ships also failed to reduce speed, despite observing one another on radar. At the time, the accident was the biggest tanker collision on record.

One of the Texanita's lifeboats was found at Bunbury, Western Australia two years later.

== Aftermath ==
The accident contributed to an overhaul of the international maritime traffic separation system that was in force at the time.

== See also ==
- Venpet–Venoil collision
- International Convention for the Safety of Life at Sea
