= The Nautical Magazine =

Monthly seafaring magazine

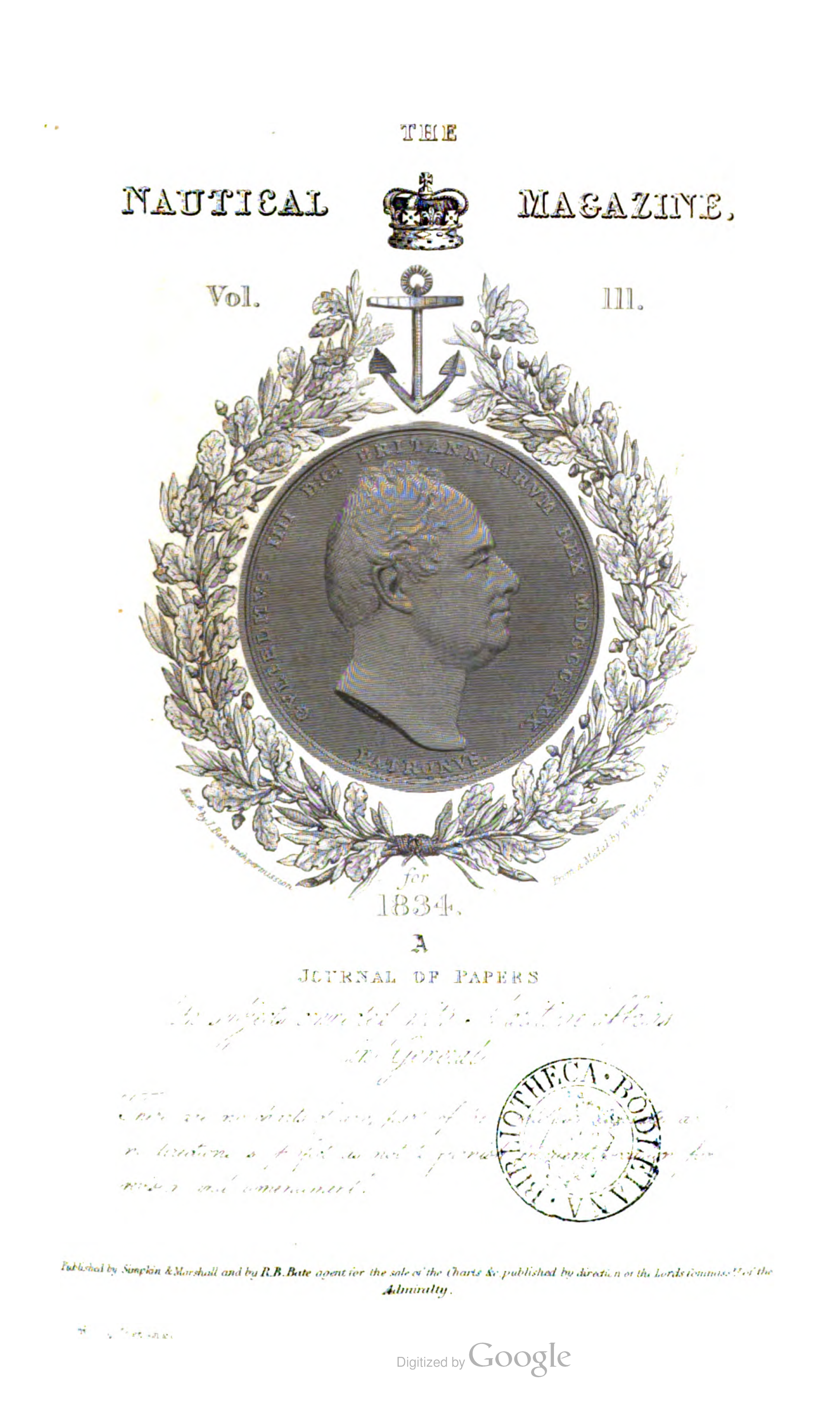
Title page of the 1834 volume, with the profile of King William IV

The Nautical Magazine was a monthly magazine containing articles of general interest to seafarers. The magazine was first published in 1832 by Simpkin, Marshall, and Co. (London) as The Nautical Magazine: A Journal of Papers on Subjects Connected with Maritime Affairs in General and then as The Nautical Magazine And Naval Chronicle. From 1891 (Volume 60) the title was modified to Nautical Magazine and Journal of the Royal Naval Reserve and it was published by Brown, Son and Ferguson, (Glasgow), who continued to produce it until it was acquired and merged into Sea Breezes in 2011.

The editors were as follows:

- 1832–1870 A.B. Becher
- 1870–1895 E. Price Edwards
- 1895–1900 Eden Hooper
- 1900–1943 James Ruthven Brown
- 1943–1954 Arch H. Ferguson
- 1954–1980 R. Ingram-Brown
- 1980–2008 Leslie Ingram-Brown
- 2009–2011 Richard Brown

In its early years, the magazine was closely associated with the Hydrographic Office of the Admiralty. The first editor, A.B. Becher, was a navy surveyor who became assistant to Francis Beaufort, Hydrographer of the Navy, and was responsible for arranging and classifying the original charts held in the office. Under Becher's editorship the magazine published details of hazards to navigation, reviewed Admiralty charts and publications, and reported on surveying activities. But it also documented a huge range of events, discoveries and achievements of the early Victorian period. It contains contemporary reports from the Crimean War and the First and Second Opium Wars, descriptions of the building and opening of the Suez Canal, and running updates on the long and fruitless search for Sir John Franklin's lost expedition in search of the North-West Passage. There are statistics on shipwrecks and on lives saved by the recently founded RNLI, information about the construction of new harbours and lighthouses, discussion of the latest technology such as iron ships, steam engines, and submarine telegraph cables, together with notes on new legislation and details of appointments and promotions of naval personnel. During this period the magazine also describes British colonies in Australia and New Zealand, rivalries with other colonial powers, and the cultures and languages of indigenous peoples from the Inuit to the Maori.

The magazine's authors have included:

- William Snow Harris, who in the 1840s published a series of articles on lightning conductors that ultimately reduced the impact of lightning strikes.
- Charles Rawden Maclean, who in the 1850s described his early years in Port Natal and Zululand (1825–1829) and his voyages to St Lucia in the 1830s.
- William Hope Hodgson, who in 1904 published an exposé on the subject of apprenticeships; at the time, families often were forced to pay to have boys accepted as apprentices.

Open access to the journal is available at the Internet Archive as follows:

- 1832 (Volume 1) * 1833 (Volume 2) * 1834 * 1835
- 1836 * 1837 * 1838 * 1839 * 1840
- 1841 * 1842 * 1843 * 1844 * 1845
- 1846 * 1847 * 1848 * 1849 * 1850
- 1851 * 1852 * 1853 * 1854 * 1855
- 1856 * 1857 * 1858 * 1859 * 1860
- 1861 * 1862 * 1863 * 1864 * 1865
- 1866 * 1867 * 1868 * 1869 * 1870
- 1871 * 1872 * 1873 * 1874 (Volume 43) * 1875 (Volume 44)
- 1876 (Volume 45) * 1877 (Volume 46) * 1878 (Volume 47) * 1879 (Volume 48) * 1880 (Volume 49)
- 1881 (Volume 50) * 1882 (Volume 51 * 1883 (Volume 52) * 1884 (Volume 53)
