= Venpet–Venoil collision =

Maritime shipping accident

Coordinates: 34°26′S 24°4′E

External image
- Photos of damage to Venoil at maritimephoto.no/

The Venpet–Venoil collision was a maritime accident involving sister supertankers; the Liberian-registered Venoil and Venpet, in dense fog off the coast of South Africa on 16 December 1977. The tankers were travelling in opposite directions; the Venoil fully laden with over 250,000 tonnes of crude oil bound for Halifax, Canada, and the Venpet, travelling in ballast, headed for Kharg Island, Iran. The Venoil ploughed into the Venpet, eventually leading to the spilling of approximately 26,600–30,500 tonnes of crude oil. The tankers were sister ships owned and operated by Bethlehem Steel Corporation. Both ships were crewed by Taiwanese sailors.

== History ==
Both tankers were constructed in Nagasaki, Japan by Mitsubishi Heavy Industries, Ltd, work beginning on the Venoil in October 1972 and the Venpet in January 1973. The vessels were completed in March and June 1973 respectively at the cost of approximately US$28 million each. Each vessel was more than 330,000 deadweight (DWT) which, at the time, classified them as Very Large Crude Carriers (VLCCs). The current classification for vessels over 300,000 DWT is Ultra Large Crude Carriers (ULCC).

== Accident ==
Eastern Cape, South Africa

The ships met on the morning of 16 December 1977. The Venoil was en route to Halifax, Nova Scotia, from the Iranian oil terminal at Kharg Island with between 250,000 and 307,000 tonnes of crude oil. The Venpet was in ballast on a reciprocal course to Kharg Island from Halifax, where she had already unloaded her cargo. Under dense fog, which reduced visibility to less than 370 metres (1,210 ft), both ships manoeuvred in the same direction in an attempt to increase their distance from one another and avoid collision.

The bow of the Venoil collided into the side of the Venpet, creating a hole 14 metres (46 ft) deep and 55 metres (180 ft) long. Both vessels caught fire, but did not explode because of their inert gas systems – the flames rising 61 metres (200 ft) into the air and the resulting smoke visible for up to 24 kilometres (15 mi) around. Both vessels had been travelling at around 13.5 knots (25.0 km/h).

The collision occurred approximately 40 kilometres (25 mi) off the southern coast of South Africa between Plettenberg Bay and Cape St. Francis. 23,980 barrels (~3,271 t) of bunker oil from Venpet's forward fuel tank and 170,635 barrels (~23,280 t) of crude oil from two of Venoil's storage tanks were spilled, for a total of 194,615 barrels (~26,550 t), some of which was consumed by the flames; patches of emulsified oil created a 160-kilometre (99 mi) wide slick, part of which impacted over 130 kilometres (81 mi) of the South African shoreline from Plettenberg Bay to Stilbaai. Another estimate concludes the Venpet lost 31,000 barrels (~4,900 t) of bunker fuel oil, and the Venoil lost 155,000 barrels (~21,500 t) of heavy crude oil and 33,000 barrels (~5,200 t) of bunker fuel oil, for a total of 219,000 barrels (~30,600 t).

The majority of the crew aboard the Venoil managed to launch a lifeboat; although thirteen men who had been trapped by the flames were rescued by helicopter. Two men lost their lives in the incident. Two British merchant ships, the bulk carrier Jedforest and the Clan Menzies rescued the remaining crews of the Venoil and Venpet respectively. The vessels were abandoned and initially drifted towards the coast as their fires eventually went out. They were towed out towards the Agulhas Current to prevent them grounding on the coastline as well as ensuring that any further release of oil would be carried away from the coastline.

The official investigation published in November 1985 by the Liberian marine board concluded that the collision was caused due to not maintaining a proper radar watch. Though both vessels were observing each other on the radar, they had accepted a low radar CPA ("closest point of approach") of 1 mile despite the poor visibility and without taking into consideration errors of radar, especially in range and bearing. It appears that the collision of Venoil and Venpet resembled the collision of the two passenger liners Andrea Doria and Stockholm in dense fog in the Atlantic south of Nantucket Island. The final cause of both accidents were "failed last minute manoeuvres". After the collision the rudder of the empty Venpet was laying hard a-starboard. The tankers could not avoid the collision.

== Aftermath ==
Both vessels were towed into Algoa Bay for repairs; the Venpet on 24 December 1977 and the Venoil on 1 January 1978. The latter had drifted 250 miles (400 km) southwest of the coast in the Agulhas Current. The Venoil's remaining crude oil was transferred to the tanker Litiopa before she eventually sailed to Halifax. The damaged ships were sailed onto shipyards at Sasebo and Nagasaki for extensive repairs.

== Later life ==
The Venoil underwent two name changes, becoming Resolute in 1981 and Opportunity in 1983. She was sailed to Ulsan, South Korea for scrapping in October 1984. Her sister Venpet was changed to Alexander the Great in 1980. In June 1984, she was hit by an Iraqi Exocet missile whilst moored at the Kharg Island oil terminal. The large scale of damage led to her scrapping, which occurred in Kaohsiung, Taiwan in the October of that year.

== See also ==
- Oswego-Guardian/Texanita collision
