= Tugela River =

River in South Africa

Tugela Thukela
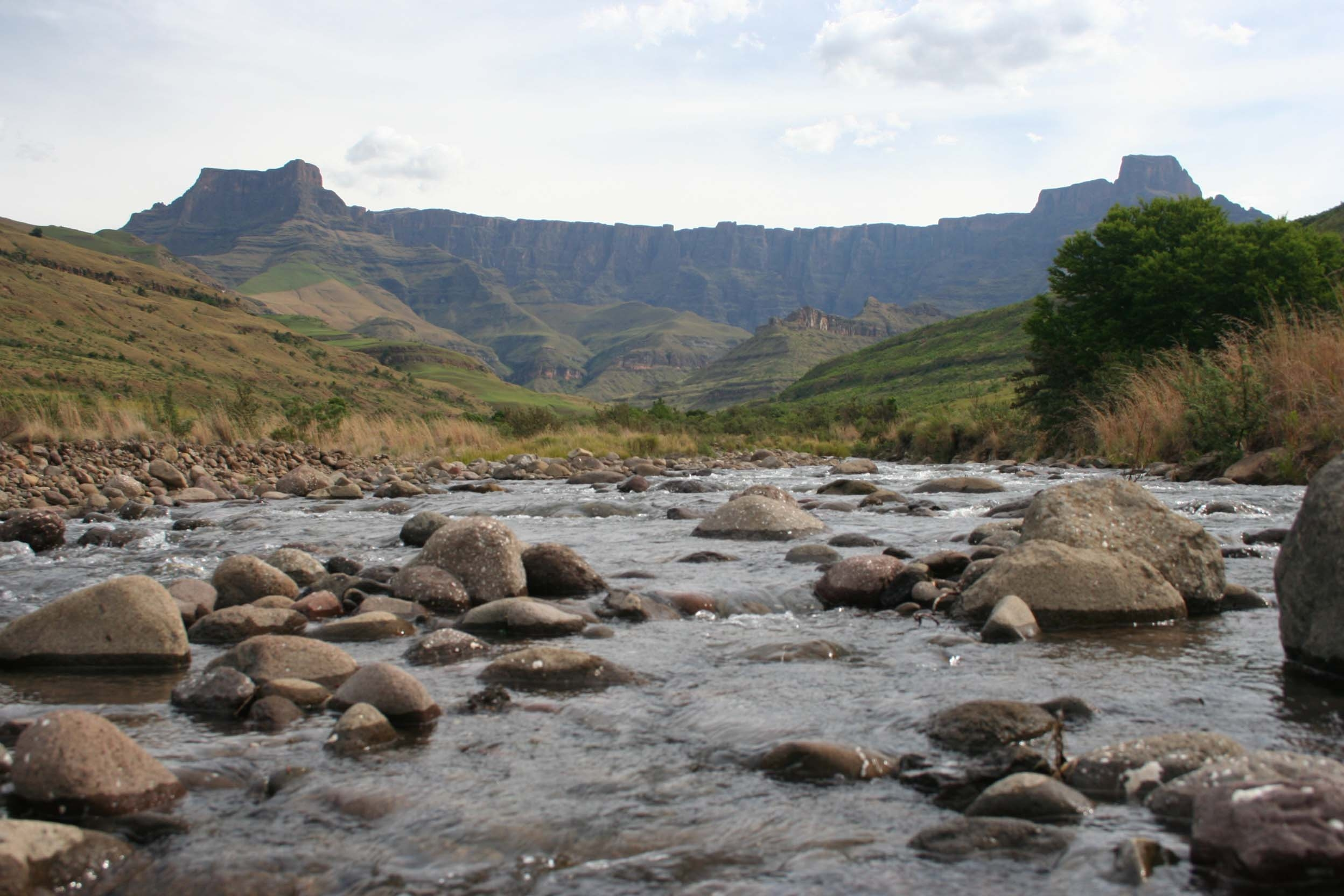
- The Tugela River with the Amphitheatre in the background

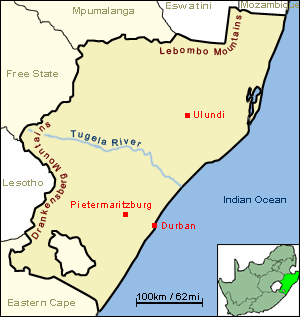
- The course of the Tugela river, from the west to the east border of KwaZulu-Natal.
- Native name: Thukela

Location
- Country: South Africa
- Province: KwaZulu-Natal
- Towns: Bergville, Colenso

Physical characteristics
- Source
  - location: Drakensberg
  - coordinates: 28°45′00″S 28°53′45″E
- Mouth: Indian Ocean
  - coordinates: 29°13′26″S 31°30′0″E
- Length: 560 km (350 mi)
- Basin size: 29,100 km^{2} (11,200 sq mi)
- Discharge
  - average: 200 m^{3}/s (7,100 cu ft/s)

Basin features
- Tributaries
  - left: Buffalo River
  - right: Mooi River

The Tugela River (Zulu: Thukela; Afrikaans: Tugelarivier) is the largest river in KwaZulu, South Africa. With a total length of 560 km (350 mi), and a drop of 1 370 metres in the lower 480 km, it is one of the most important rivers of the country.

The river originates in Mont-aux-Sources of two other major South African rivers, the Orange and the Caledon River. From the Drakensberg range, the Tugela follows a 560 km (350 mi) route through the KwaZulu-Natal midlands before flowing into the Indian Ocean. The total catchment area is approximately 29,100 km^{2} (11,200 mi^{2}). Land uses in the catchment are mainly rural subsistence farming and commercial forestry.

== Tributaries ==
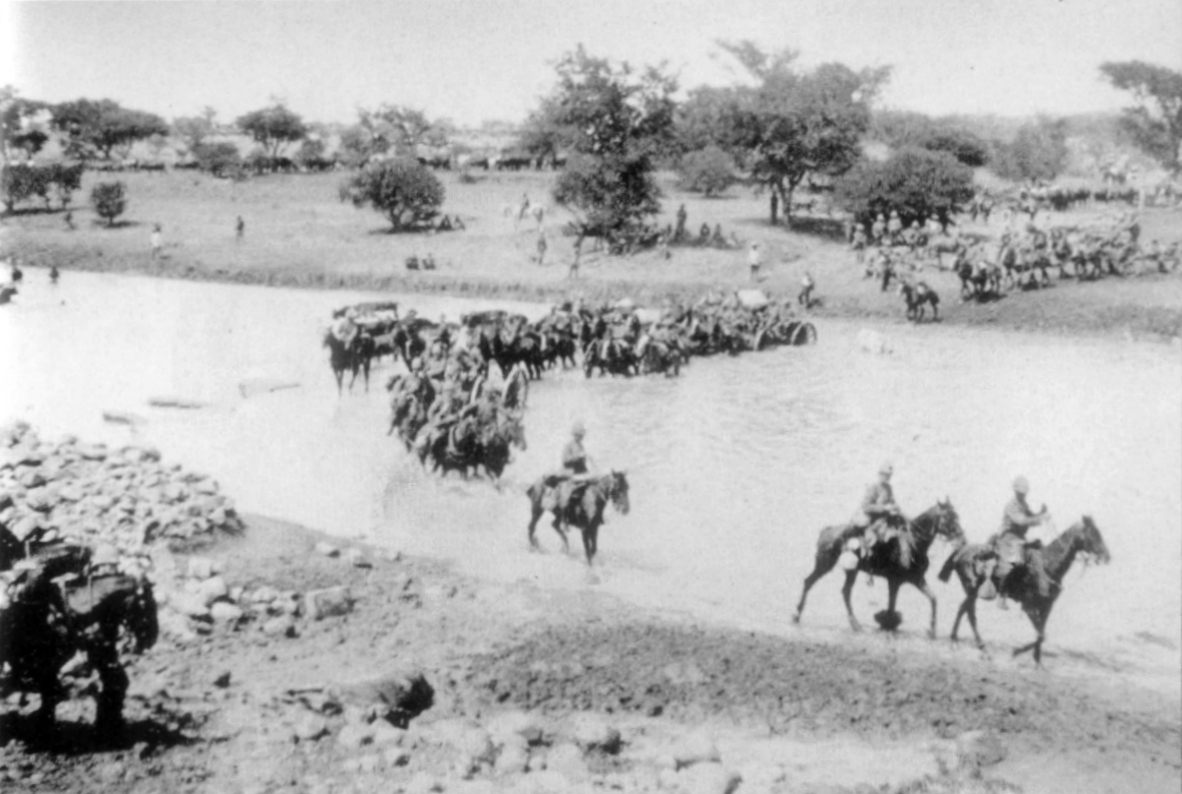
British troops crossing the river during the Second Boer War

The Tugela is fed by a number of tributaries coming off the Drakensberg, the largest being the Mzinyathi ("Buffalo") River (rising near Majuba Hill). Others are the Little Tugela River, Klip River (rising near Van Reenen Pass), Mooi River, Blood River, Sundays River (rising in the Biggarsberg) Ingagani River and Bushman River. The Buffalo River joins the Tugela some 19 km (12 mi) east of Tugela Ferry at 28°43′04″S 30°38′41″E.

The Blood River was named by the Boers, led by Andries Pretorius, after they defeated the Zulu king Dingane on 16 December 1838. The river is said to have run red with the blood of Zulu warriors. Below the Blood River is Rorke's Drift, a crossing point and a battle site, in the Anglo-Zulu War.

== Ecology ==
The scaly yellowfish (Labeobarbus natalensis) is found in the Tugela River System. It is a common endemic fish in KwaZulu-Natal Province and it is found in different habitats between the Drakensberg foothills and the coastal lowlands, including rivers such as the Umkomazi.

== Spelling ==
The spelling Tugela was used for most of the twentieth century; it is an Anglicised version of the Zulu name Thukela. Nineteenth-century writers adopted a variety of spellings including:

- Isaacs (1836) used a number of different spellings in his book, Travels and Adventures in Eastern Africa, including Ootergale and Ootoogale.
- C.R. Maclean (John Ross), writing in the Nautical Magazine in 1853, used the spelling Zootagoola
- George French Angas, a nineteenth-century artist, used the name Tugala on the captions to his sketches.

Some of the variations can be accounted for by the early European writers being unaware that Zulu grammar uses prefixes, often a "i-" or a "u-", to denote the noun class of a noun.

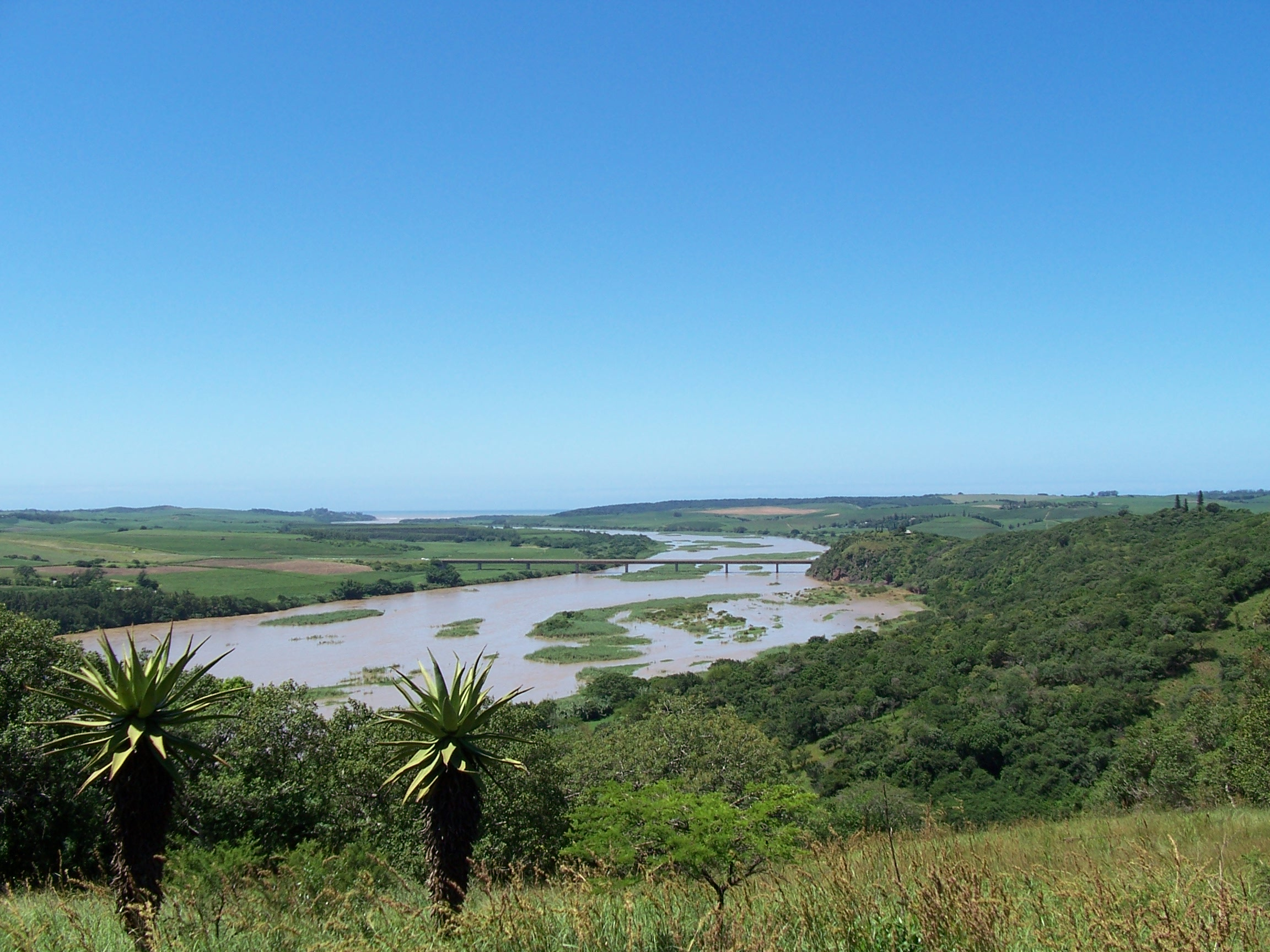
Tugela river mouth

== See also ==
- List of rivers in South Africa

Dams on the Tugela

- Driel Barrage Dam
- Spioenkop Dam
- Woodstock Dam
