= Klingspor Museum =

Museum of book production and typography

Coordinates: 50°06′28″N 8°45′40″E

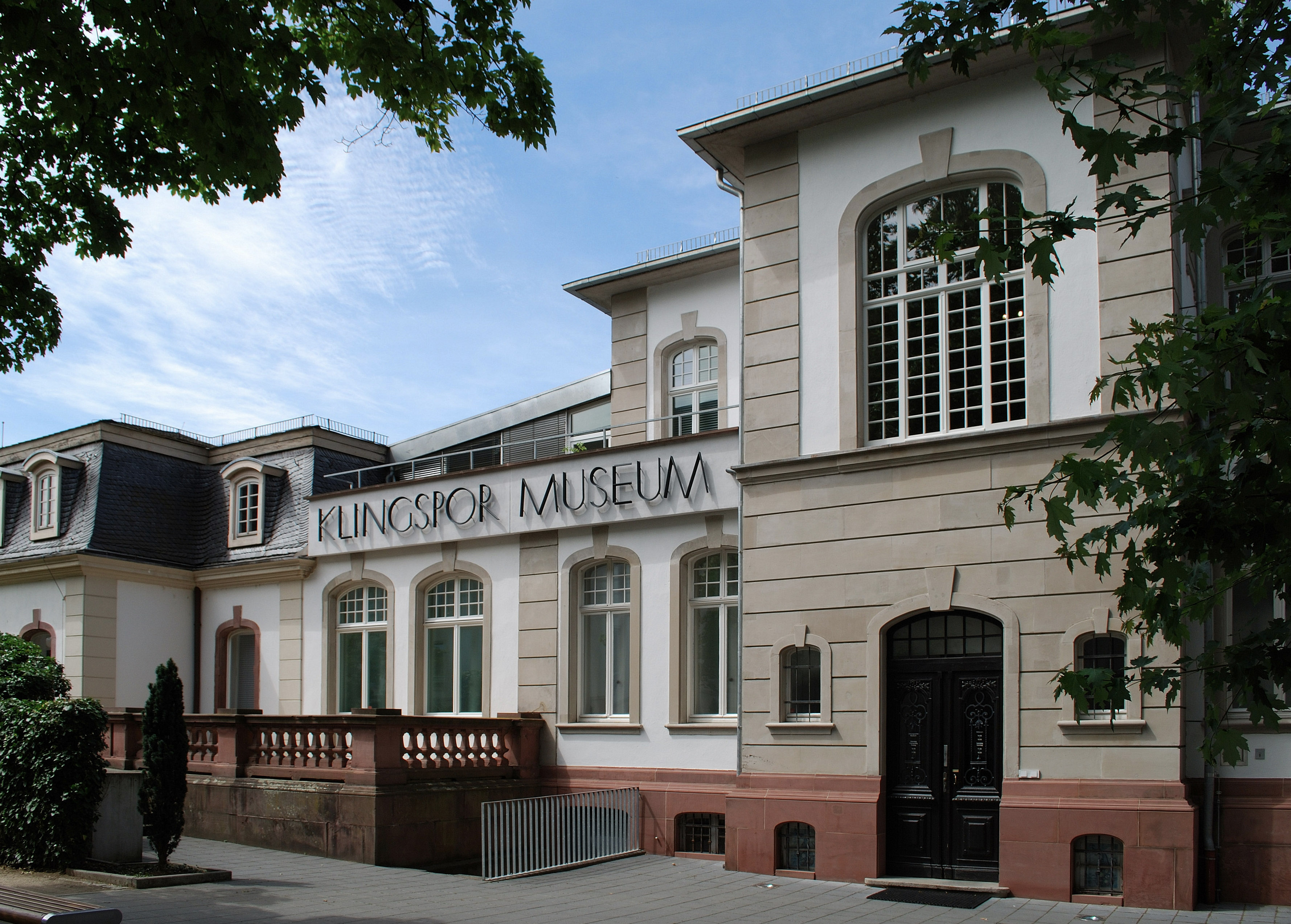
Klingspor-Museum

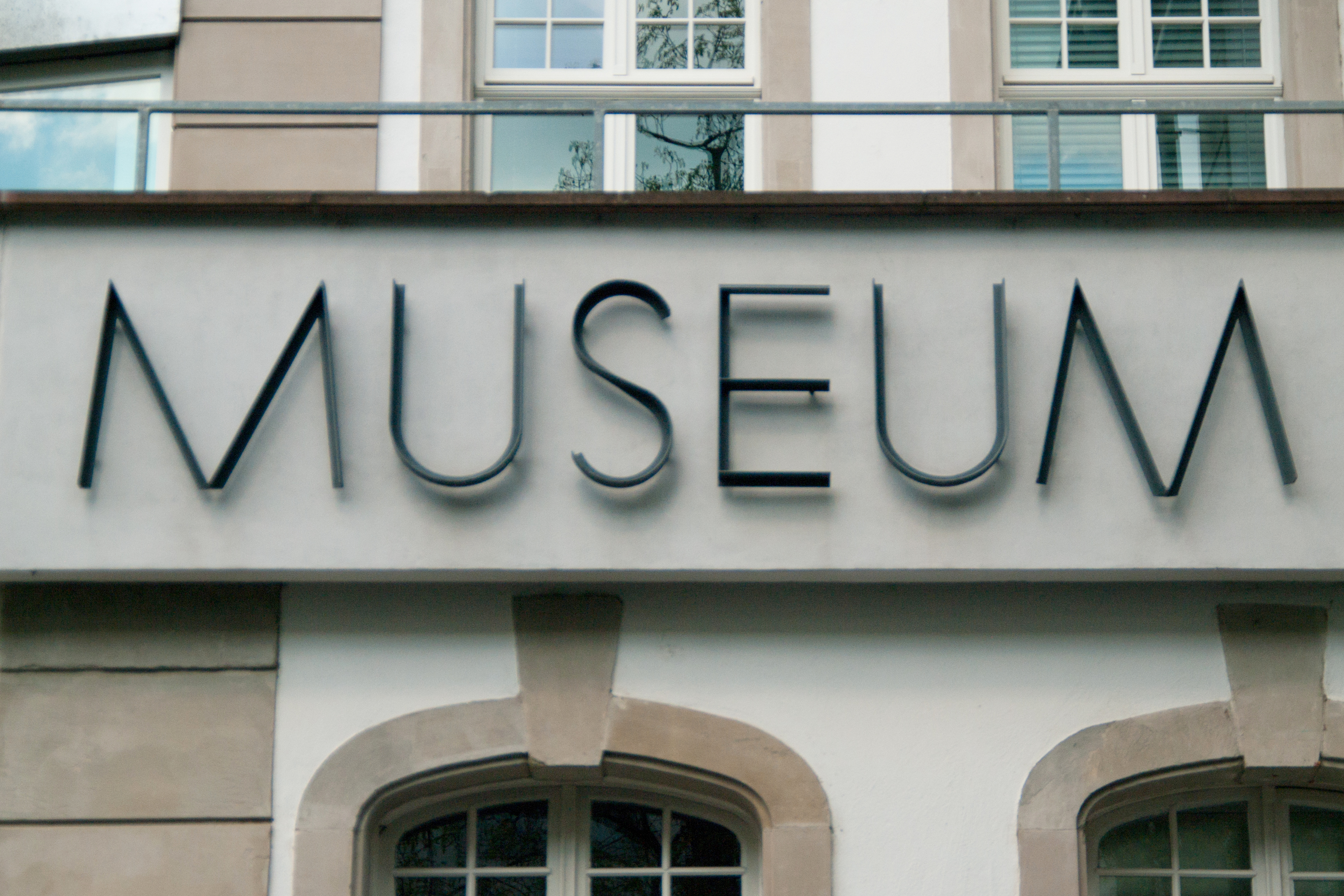
"Museum" sign at the Klingspor Museum for typography

Klingspor Museum, Offenbach

The Klingspor-Museum is a museum in Offenbach, Germany, specializing in the art of modern book production, typography and type. It includes a collection of fine art books from Karl Klingspor, one of the owners of Klingspor Type Foundry in Offenbach am Main, which inspired the museum's creation.

== The collection ==
The museum hosts the work of famous type designers like Rudolf Koch, Otto Eckmann, Peter Behrens, Walter Tiemann, Rudo Spemann, Imre Reiner, Hans Bohn, Karlgeorg Hoefer, Ernst Schneidler, Werner Bunz and Georg Trump.

Paul Ritter donated his collection of Frans Masereel to the museum. Many works from other printing collections such as the Acorn Press, Bremer Presse, Cranach Presse, Doves Press, Edition Tiessen, Ernst Engel Presse (to name a few), are in the collection of the museum.

The library is open to visitors and holds several exhibitions each year.

== See also ==
- Museumsufer
