= Wallau (typeface) =

Typeface by German designer Rudolf Koch

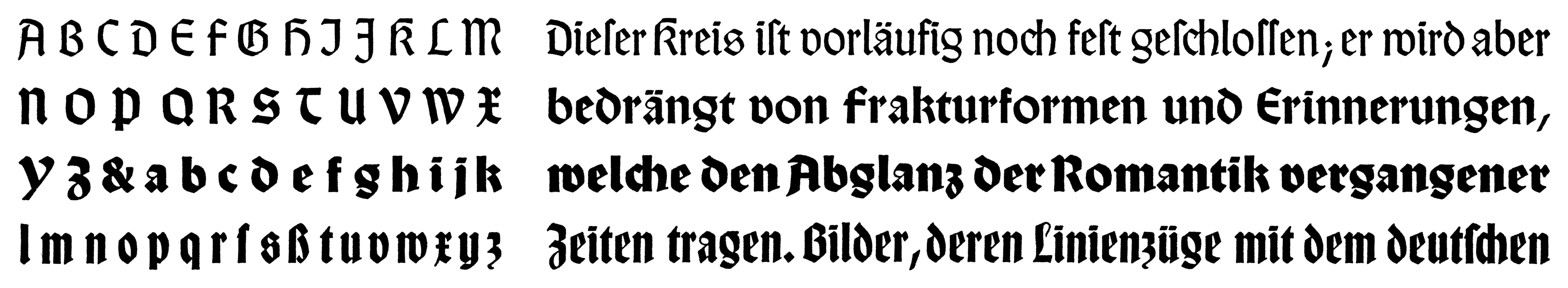
Wallau sample

Wallau is a grotesque blackletter typeface family by the German designer Rudolf Koch.

== Description ==
It features restrained serifs and clear contrasts in line thickness, as if drawn using a broad nib pen, with a mixture of curves and relatively soft breaks in the line forms. In order to be suitable also for body text, it featured simple and open letterforms for easy legibility.

== History ==
Over a period of five years, Koch published three weights and a narrow version, starting with semibold in 1930, published by the Klingspor Brothers type foundry in Offenbach. Koch produced two sets of capital letters: one of roman and then also Gothic (“german”) versions. It was named in honour of the printer Heinrich Wallau, who had proposed the concept of doing broken designs based on Rotunda (Rundgotisch) in 1885 and was a friend of one of the foundry owners.

Wallau was designed at a time of renewed interest in blackletter type shapes. While Koch was sympathetic to the Nazi cause and the grotesque blackletter category as well as his designs were embraced by the Nazis until they banned all blackletters in 1941, the publication of the Wallau typeface clearly predated the Nazi regime. It has seen several digital revivals of varying quality and completeness.
