= Neuland =

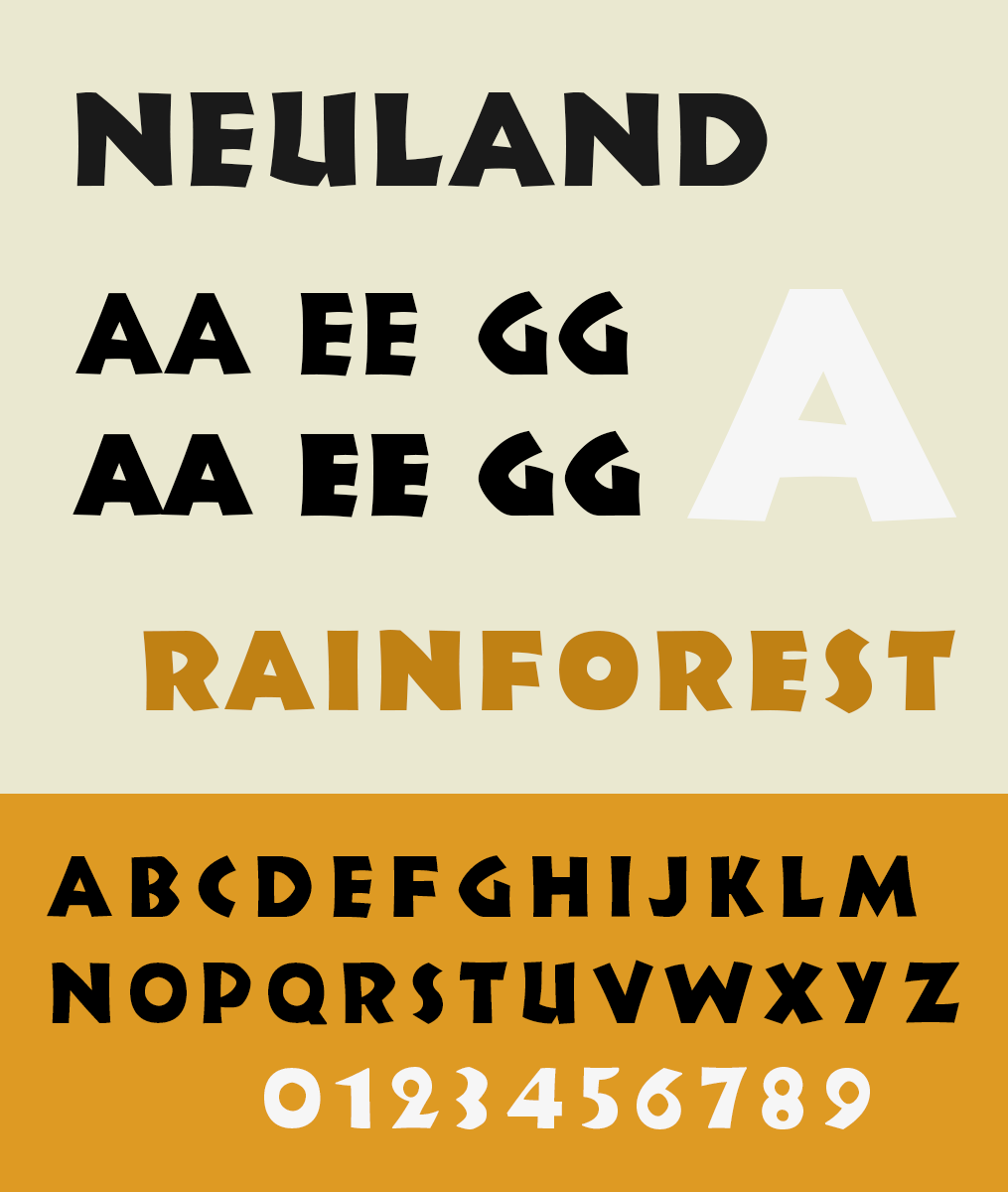
- Category: Display
- Designer: Rudolf Koch
- Foundry: Klingspor
- Date created: 1923
- Sample

Neuland (German pronunciation: [ˈnɔʏlant]) is a German typeface that was designed in 1923 by Rudolf Koch for the Klingspor Type Foundry.

Koch designed it by directly carving each size of each letter into metal. The original typeface thus had a different appearance in each of its sizes, something not followed in digital versions where the same font serves for every print size.

While originally intended as a form of modern blackletter, Neuland has come instead to be used as a signifier of the "exotic" or "primitive", such as in the logos for Trader Vic's, Natural American Spirit cigarettes, promotional materials for The Lion King, and the Jurassic Park films (which use the "inline" variant, so named because each letter has a thin line inside); the association of this "exotic" or "primitive" implication with African or African-American themes has been criticized.

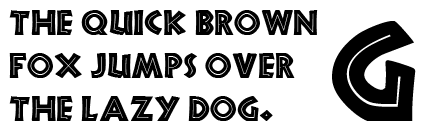
Sample of Neuland Inline

Neuland Inline is a common variant of Neuland, perhaps more common than the standard variety.

Monotype licensed Neuland under the name of 'Othello' (released in 1928) with the agreement that it would not be sold in Germany, Austria or Switzerland.

Phosphor, by Jakob Erbar, was a contemporary competitor that has a more regular shape. Phosphate, an unofficial revival of Phosphor created by Red Rooster Fonts, is bundled with OS X.

Nick Curtis's JungleFever typeface is based on Neuland.
