= Jugendstil =

Artistic movement; German equivalent of Art Nouveau

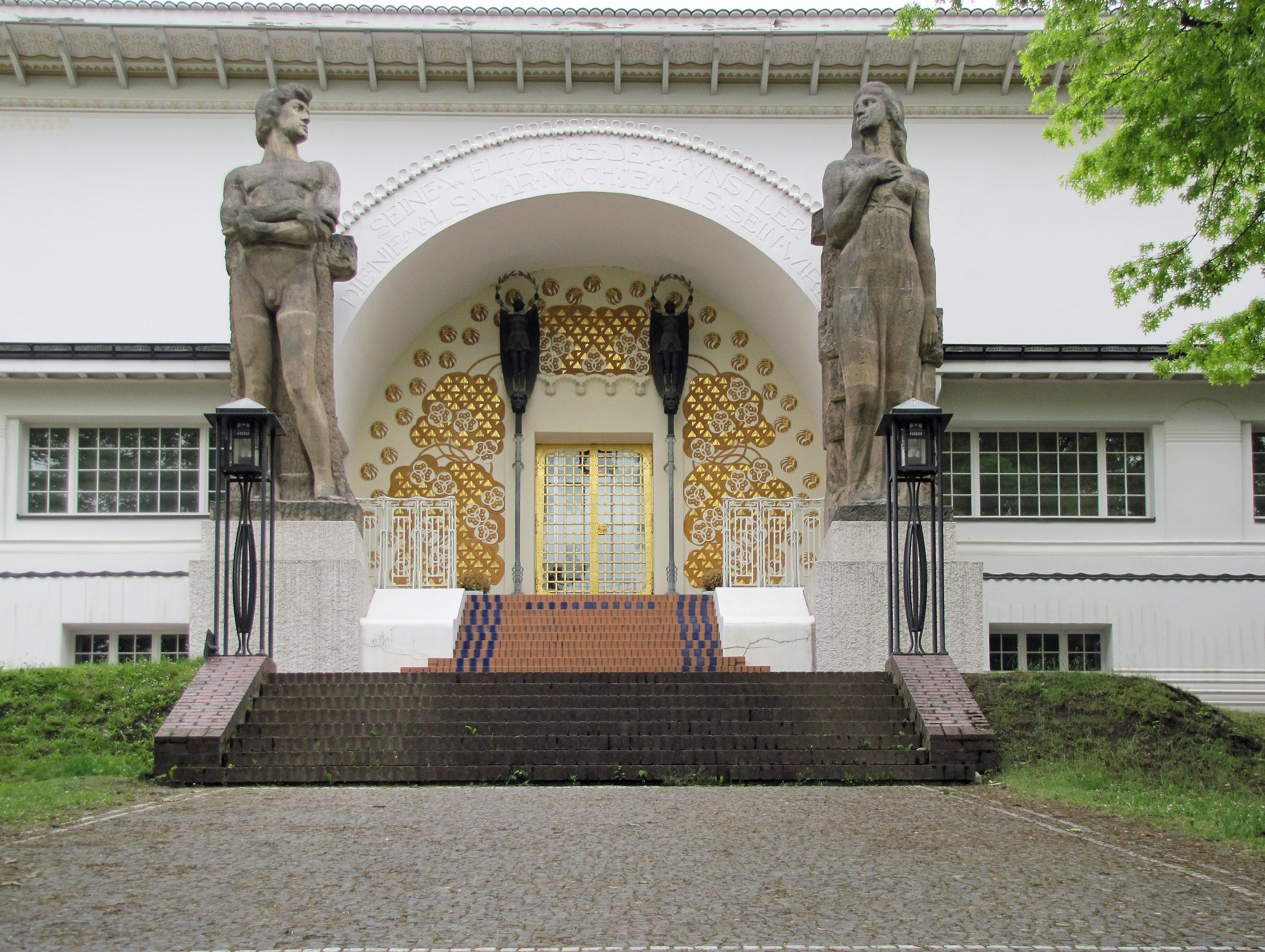
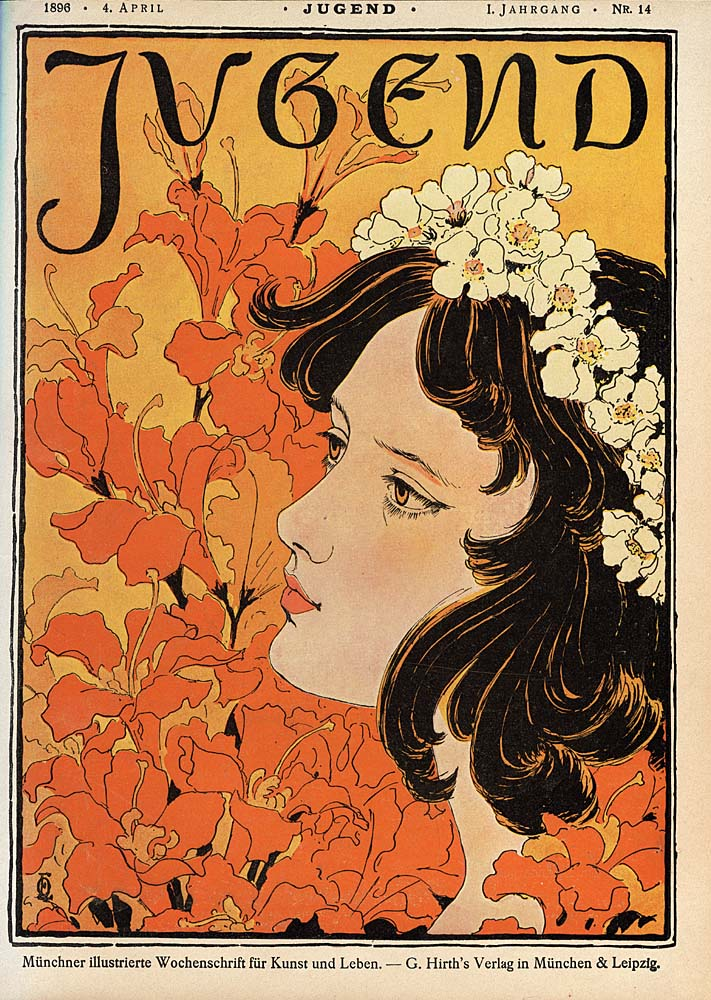
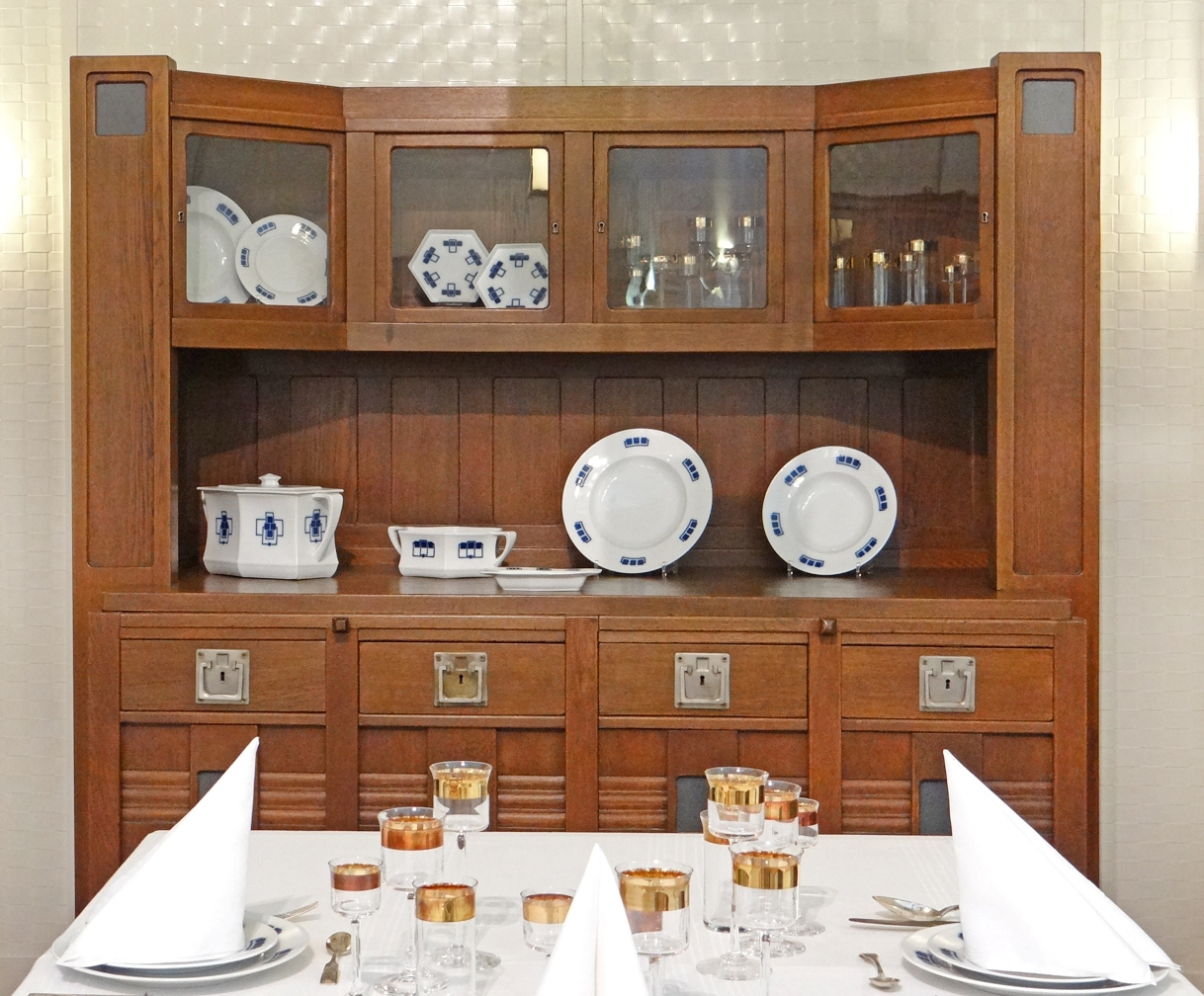
- Top: Ernst Ludwig House at the Darmstadt Artists' Colony; Center: cover of Jugend magazine by Otto Eckmann (1896); Bottom: Dining room of Peter Behrens in Darmstadt (1900–1901)

Additional media
- Years active: c. 1896–1914
- Location: Germany

Jugendstil (German pronunciation: [ˈjuːɡn̩tˌstiːl]; "Youth Style") was an artistic movement, particularly in the decorative arts, that was influential primarily in Germany, Austria, and elsewhere in Europe to a lesser extent from about 1895 until about 1910. It was the German and Austrian counterpart of Art Nouveau. The members of the movement were reacting against the historicism and neo-classicism of the official art and architecture academies. It took its name from the art journal Jugend, founded by the German artist Georg Hirth. It was especially active in the graphic arts and interior decoration.

Its major centers of activity were Munich, Vienna, Weimar and the Darmstadt Artists' Colony founded in Darmstadt in 1901. Important figures of the movement included the Swiss graphic artist Hermann Obrist, Otto Eckmann, the Belgian architect and decorator Henry van de Velde, as well as the Austrians Otto Wagner, Joseph Maria Olbrich, Gustav Klimt, and Koloman Moser, among others. In its earlier years, the style was influenced by the British Modern Style. It was also influenced by Japanese prints. Later, under the Secessionists' influence, it tended toward abstraction and more geometrical forms.

From 1898 to 1903, the Vienna Secession, led by Gustav Klimt and Max Kurzweil published the journal Ver Sacrum, an important chronicle of many of the group's artistic contributions to the world of art and design.

The Secession Building, completed in 1898 by Joseph Maria Olbrich in Vienna, is widely regarded as one of Europes most noteworthy early modernist buildings in the style of the Vienna Secession.

== History ==
The movement had its origins in Munich with the founding of an association of visual artists in 1892, which broke away from the more formal historical and academic styles of the academy. Georg Hirth chose the name Munich Secession for the association. Later, the Vienna Secession, founded in 1897 and the Berlin Secession took their own names from the Munich group. The journal of the group, Jugend, begun in 1896, along with another Munich publication, Simplicissimus and Pan in Berlin, became the most visible showcases of the new style. The leading figures of this movement, including Peter Behrens, Bernhard Pankok, and Richard Riemerschmid, as well as the majority of the founding members of the Munich Secession, all provided illustrations to Jugend.

In the beginning, the style was used primarily in illustrations and graphic arts. Jugendstil combined floral decoration and sinuous curves with more geometric lines, and soon was used for covers of novels, advertisements, and exhibition posters. Designers often created original styles of typeface that worked harmoniously with the image, such as the Arnold Böcklin typeface created in 1904.

Otto Eckmann was one of the most prominent German artists associated with both Jugend and Pan. His favourite animal was the swan, and so great was his influence that the swan came to serve as the symbol of the entire movement. Another prominent designer in the style was Richard Riemerschmid, who made furniture, pottery, and other decorative objects in a sober, geometric style that pointed forward toward Art Deco. The Swiss artist Hermann Obrist, living in Munich, made designs with sinuous double curves, modeled after plants and flowers, which were a prominent motif of the early style.

=== Joseph Maria Olbrich and the Darmstadt Artists' Colony ===
The Darmstadt Artists' Colony is a remarkable collection of Jugendstil buildings created beginning in 1899 by Ernest Ludwig, Grand Duke of Hesse, a grandson of Queen Victoria, to promote both commerce and the arts. He brought together a group of designers to create his new community, including Peter Behrens, Hans Christiansen, and Joseph Maria Olbrich. The Colony architecture represented a complete break with the earlier floral style, and was much bolder in its design. Behrens and several of the other architects built their own houses there, and designed every detail, from the doorknobs to the dishes.

The most impressive building of the Colony is the Ernst-Ludwig House, named for the Grand Duke, which contained the workshops of the artists. It was designed by Olbrich, with an entrance in the form of a three-quarter circle, flanked by two statues, Force and Beauty, by Ludwig Habich (1901).

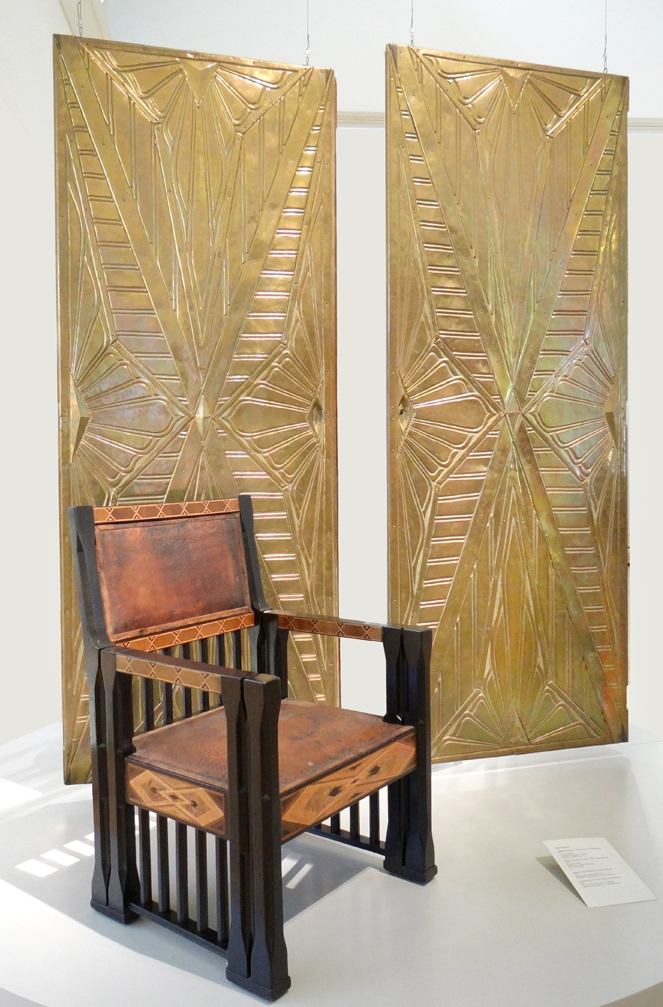
Armchair and aluminum bronze doors designed by Peter Behrens for his music room at Darmstadt

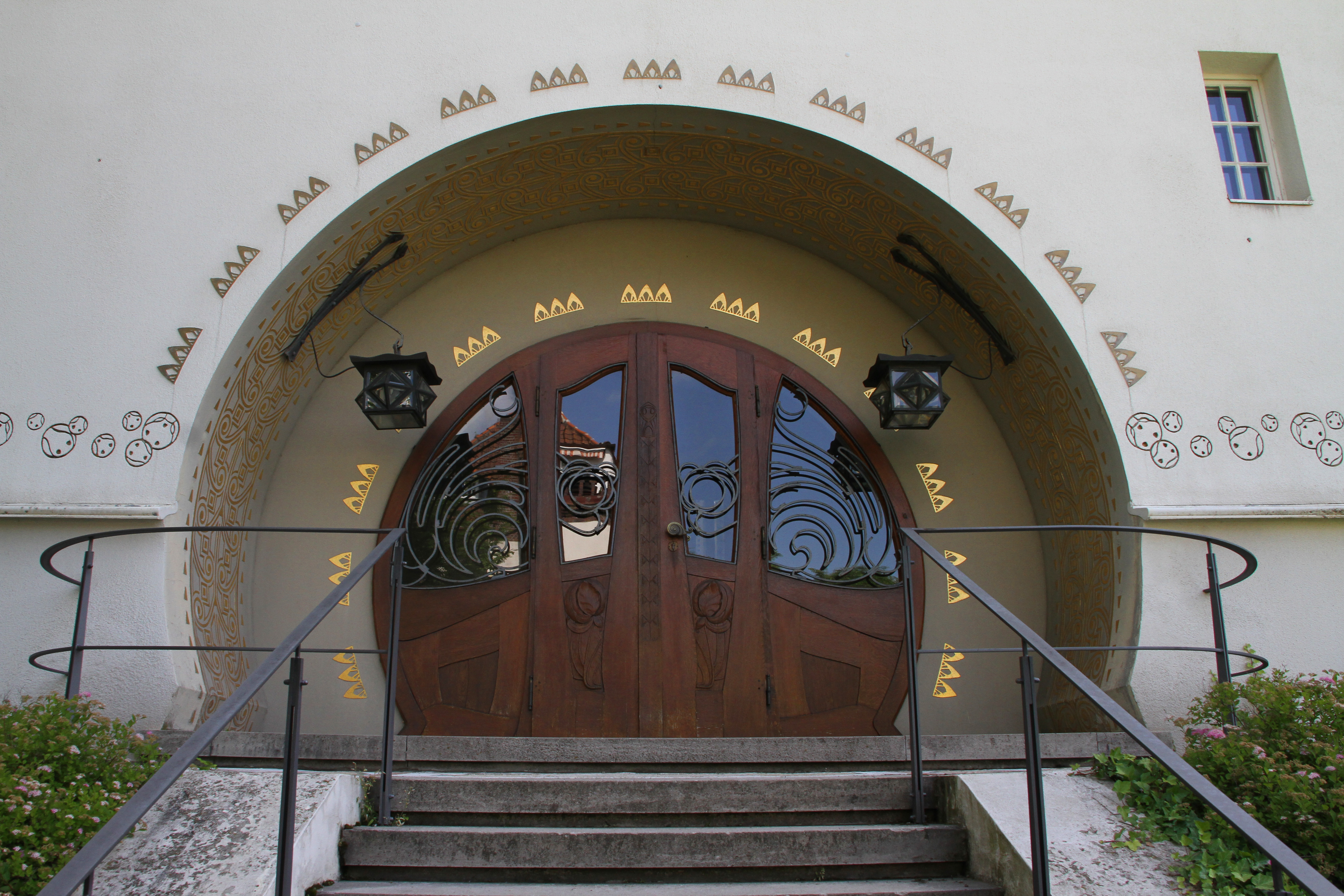
The Mathildenhöhe – Glückert House (1901)

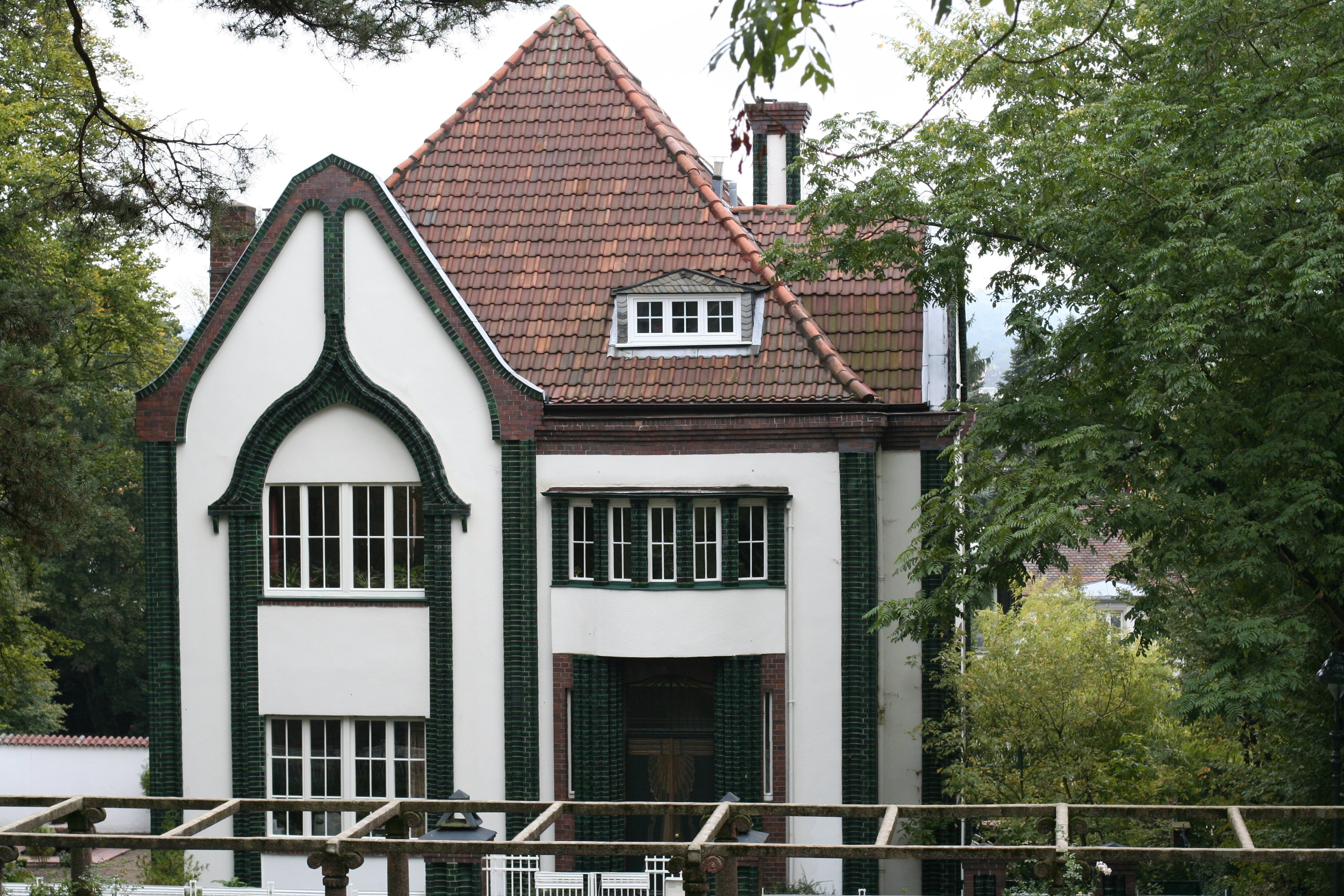
Behrens' house

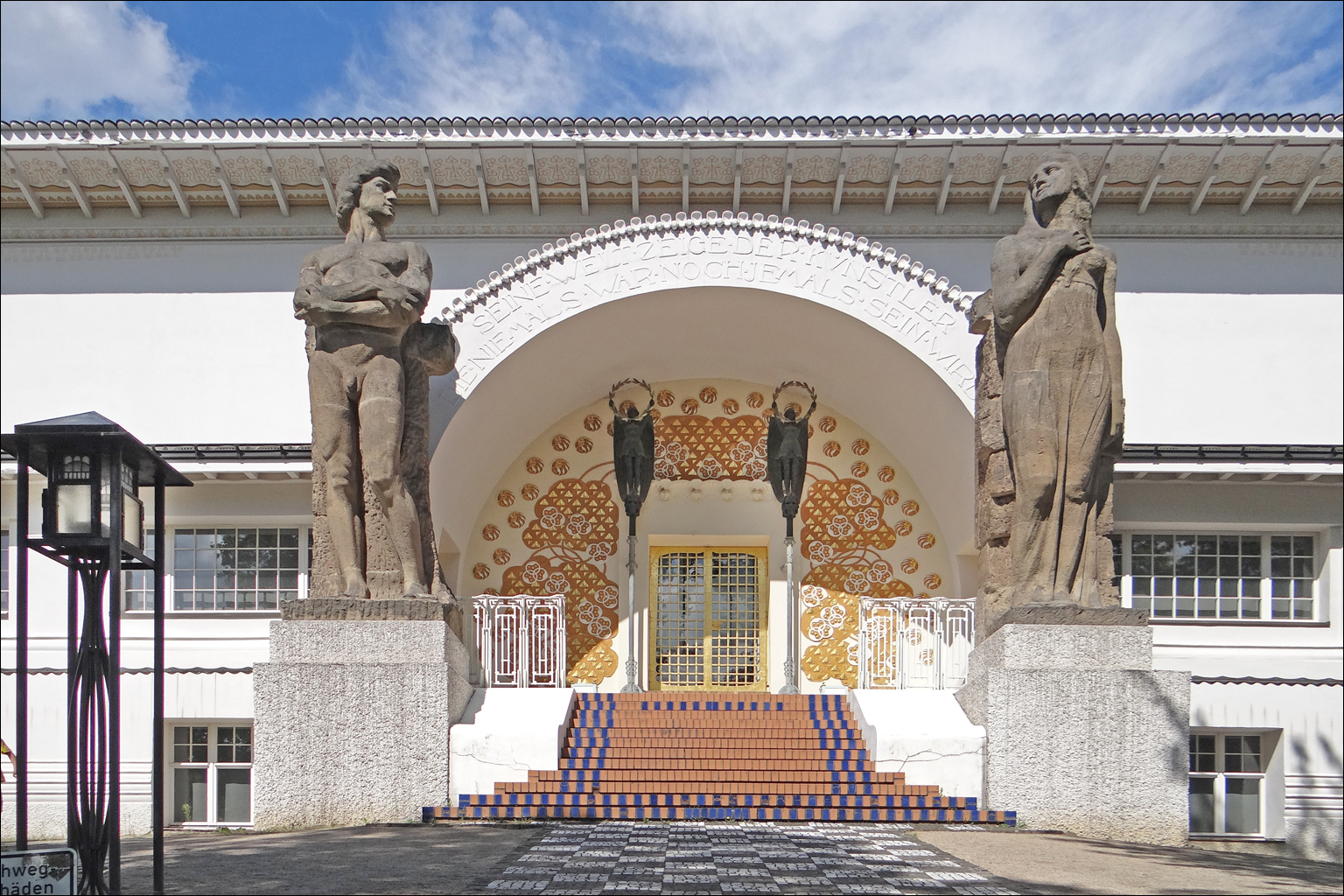
Entrance to the Ernst-Ludwig House, the workshop of the artists at the Darmstadt Colony, by Joseph Maria Olbrich (1901)

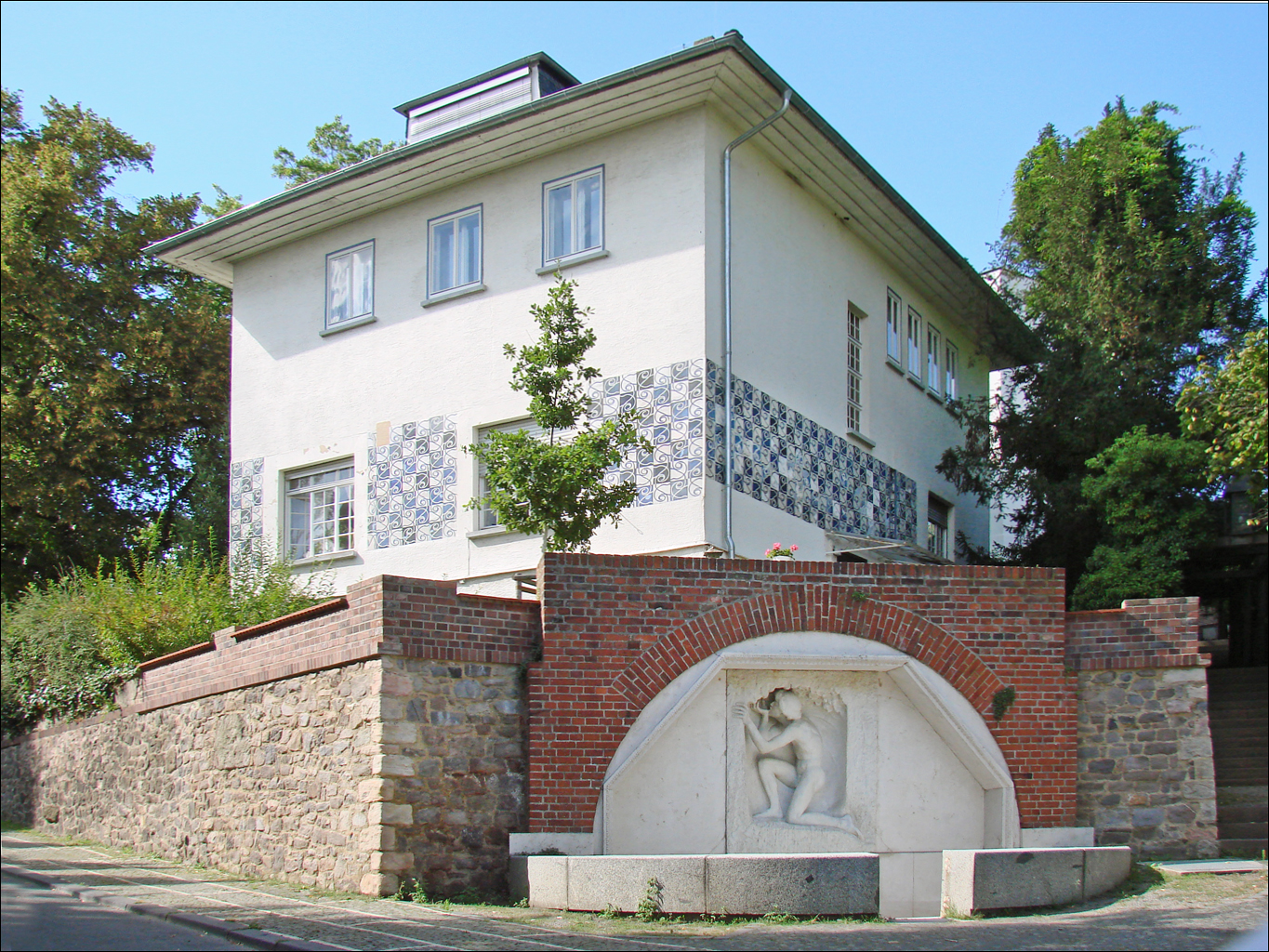
Olbrich's house, reconstructed in a simpler style after it was destroyed in World War II. Only the colored checkerboard design is original.

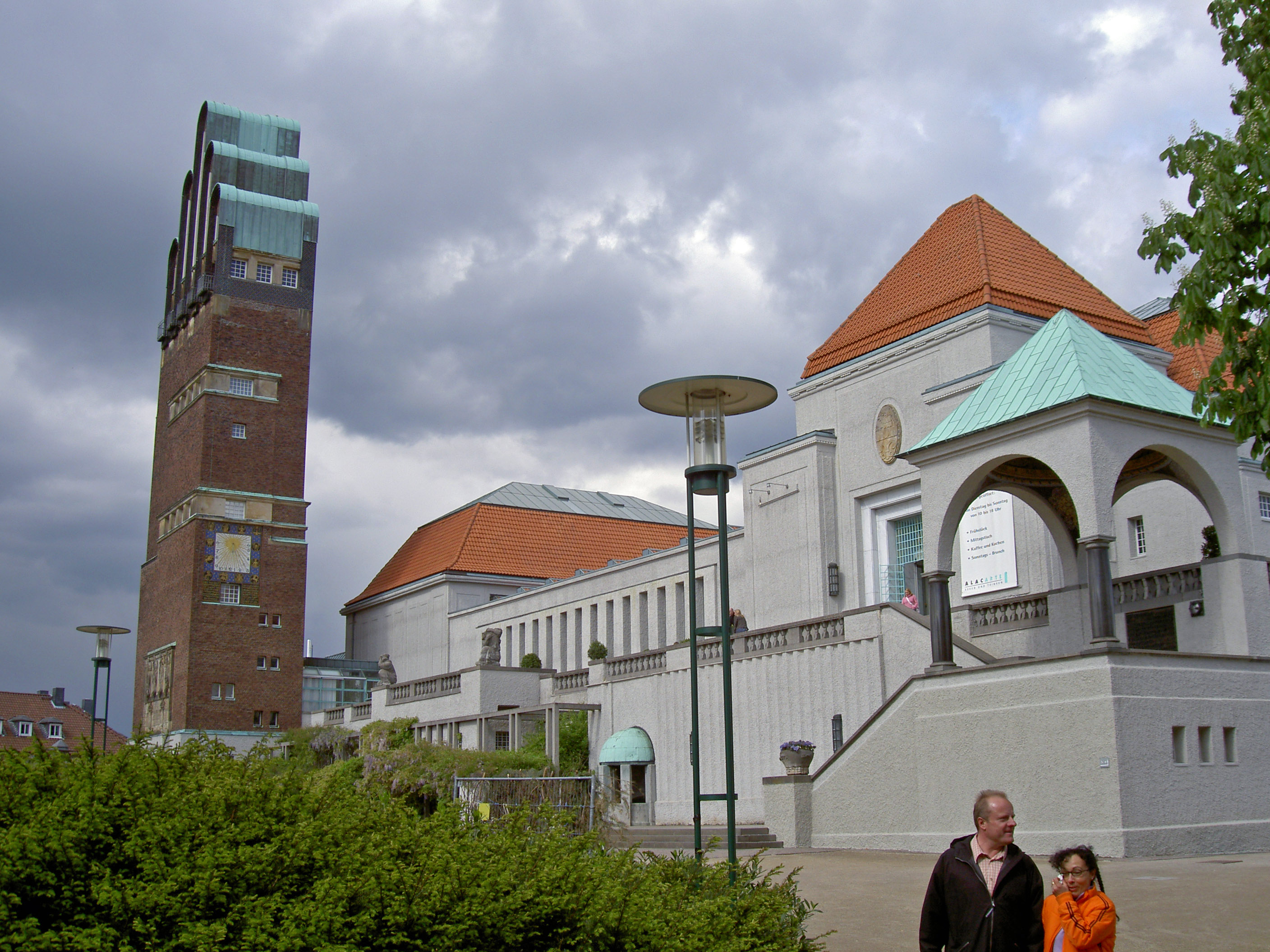
Exhibition Building (1901)

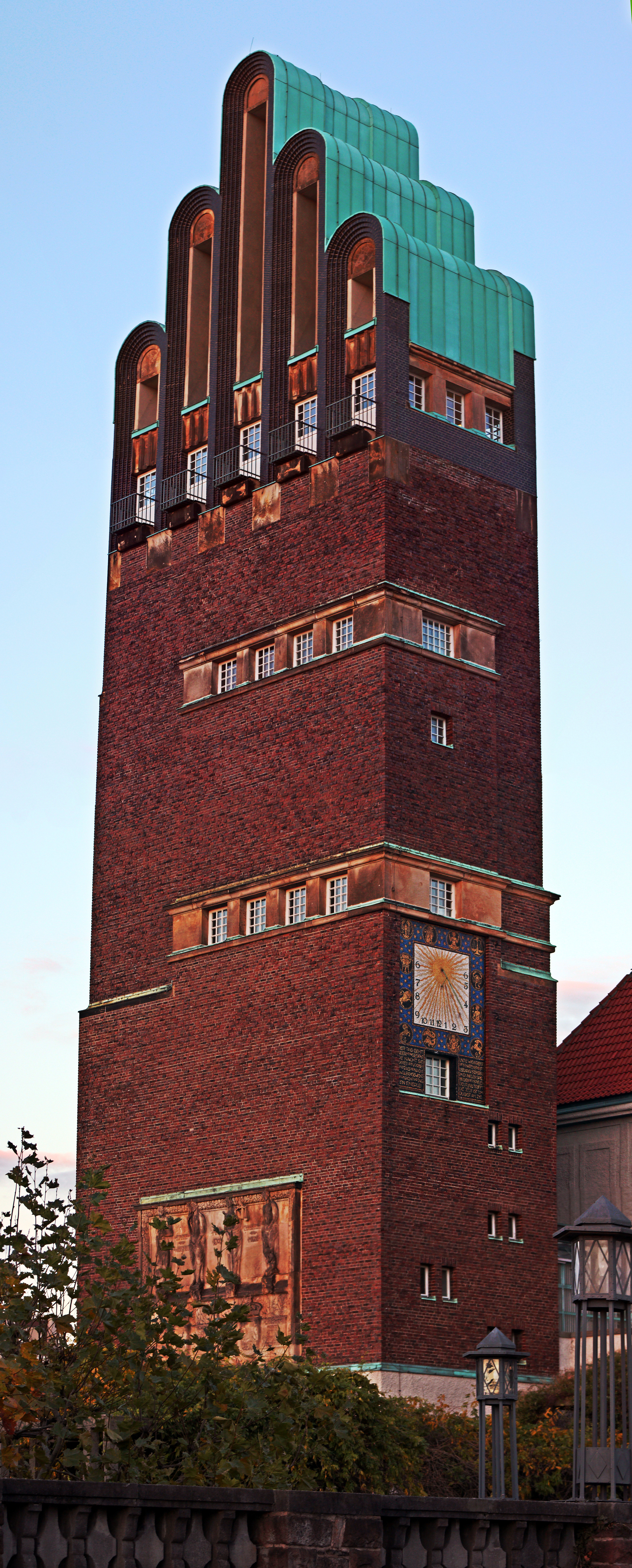
Wedding Tower (1901)

=== Ålesund ===
The Norwegian town of Ålesund suffered a disastrous fire on 23 January 1904. With the support of Kaiser Wilhelm II of Germany the town was reconstructed in Jugendstil by local Norwegian designers and architects. To honor Wilhelm, one of the most frequented streets of the town is named after him.

=== Henry van de Velde and Weimar ===
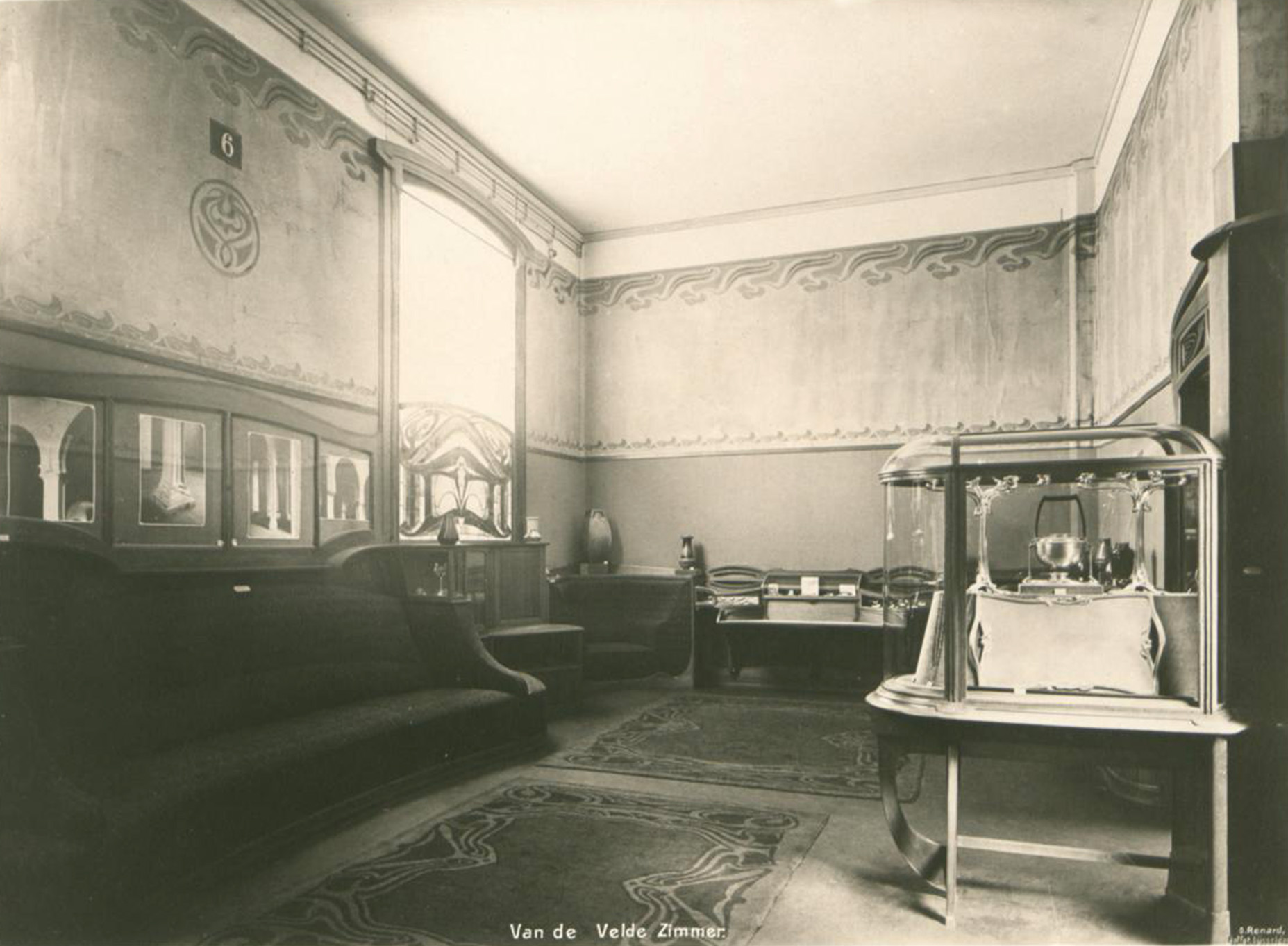
Interior of Room 6 of the Arts Palace, Düsseldorf by Henry van de Velde (1902)

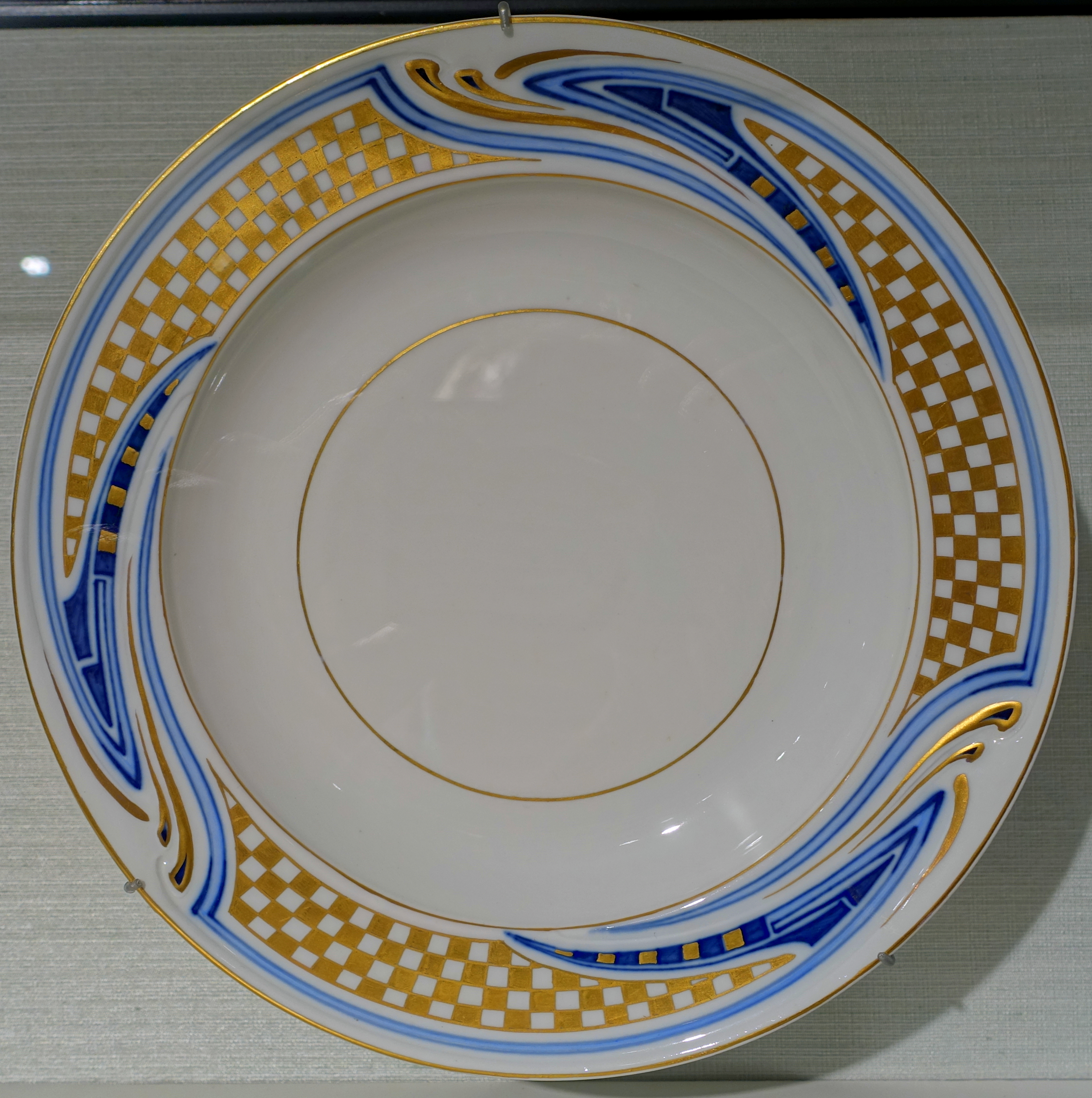
Porcelain plate by Henry van de Velde for Meissen factory (1903) (Darmstadt Museum)

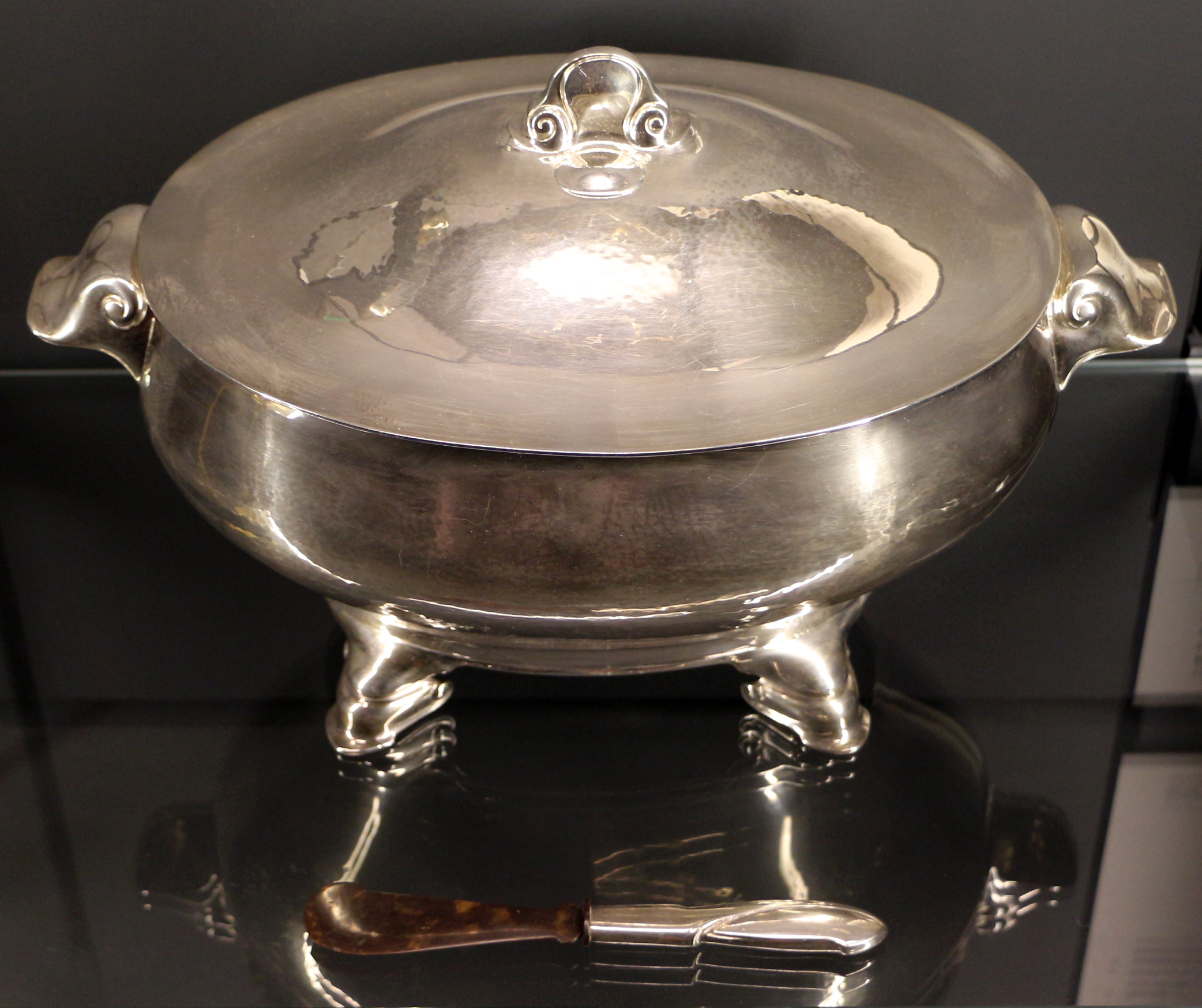
Silver terrine by Henry van de Velde (1905–06)

The city of Weimar was another important center of the Jugendstil, thanks largely to the Belgian architect and designer Henry van de Velde. Van de Velde had played an important role in the early Belgian Art Nouveau, building his own house and decorating it in Art Nouveau style, with the strong influence of the British Arts and Crafts Movement. He was a known in Germany for his work in Belgium and Paris, and began a new career in Dresden in 1897, with a display at the Dresden Exposition of decorative arts. His work became known in Germany through decorative arts journals, and he received several commissions for interiors in Berlin, for the Villa Esche in Chemnitz, the Folkwang Museum in Hagen, and the Nietzsche House in Weimar for Elisabeth Förster-Nietzsche, the sister of philosopher Friedrich Nietzsche. He settled in Weimar in 1899 and produced a wide variety of decorative works, including silverware and ceramics, all in strikingly original forms. His silverware was particularly unusual: each piece had its own form, with sleek curving lines, but together they formed a harmonious ensemble. In 1902, he decorated the apartment of Count Harry Kessler, a prominent patron of the Impressionist painters.

In 1905, with the patronage of the Grand Duke of Weimar, he created the Grand Ducal School of Arts and Crafts in Weimar. He created a showcase of applied arts for the Dresden Exposition of Applied Arts in 1906, decorated with paintings by Ludwig von Hofmann, intended as the main room of a new museum of decoration in Weimar. He transposed the characteristics of his silverware, dishes, and furniture into the architecture. Van de Velde left off the curling vegetal lines of Art Nouveau decoration and replaced them with much simpler, more stylized curves which were part of the structure of his buildings and decorative works.

The importance of Weimar as a cultural center of the Jugendstil was ended in 1906, when its main patron, Count Harry Kessler, commissioned Rodin to make a nude statue for the Grand Duke. The Grand Duke was scandalized, and Kessler was forced to resign. The Weimar school of design lost its importance until 1919, when it returned as the Bauhaus under Walter Gropius, and played a major part in the emergence of modern architecture.

=== Peter Behrens and the German Werkbund ===
The architect and designer Peter Behrens (1868–1940) was a key figure in the final years of the Jugendstil, and in the transition to modern architecture. Born in Hamburg, where he studied painting, Behrens moved to Munich in 1890 and worked as a painter, illustrator and bookbinder. In 1890, he was one of the founders of the Munich Secession. In 1899, he was invited to participate in the Darmstadt Artists' Colony, where he designed his own house and all of its contents, including the furniture, towels and dishes.

After 1900 he became involved in industrial design and the reform of architecture to more functional forms. In 1902, he participated in the Turin International Exposition, one of the first major Europe-wide showcases of Art Nouveau. In 1907, Behrens and a group of other notable Jugendstil artists, including Hermann Muthesius, Theodor Fischer, Josef Hoffmann, Joseph Maria Olbrich, Bruno Paul, Richard Riemerschmid, and Fritz Schumacher, created the Deutscher Werkbund. Modeled after the Arts and Crafts movement in England, its goal was to improve and modernize the design of industrial products and everyday objects. He first major project was AEG turbine factory in Berlin (1908–1909). Behren's assistants and students at this time included Mies van der Rohe, C. E. Jeanerette (the future Le Corbusier), and Walter Gropius, the future head of the Bauhaus. The work of Behrens and the Werkbund effectively launched the transition from the Jugendstil to modernism in Germany, and the end of the Jugendstil.

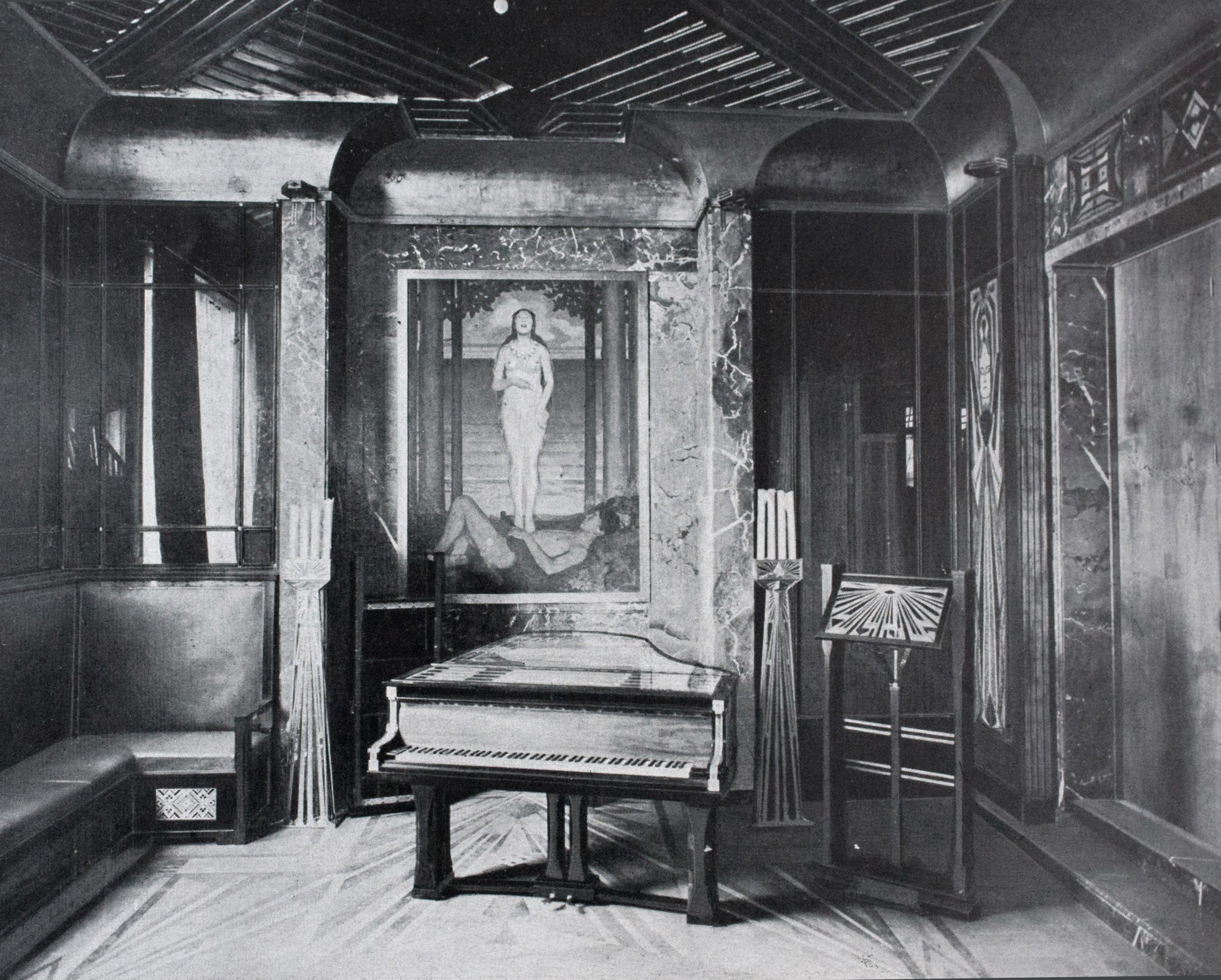
Music room of Behrens' house in Darmstadt (1902)

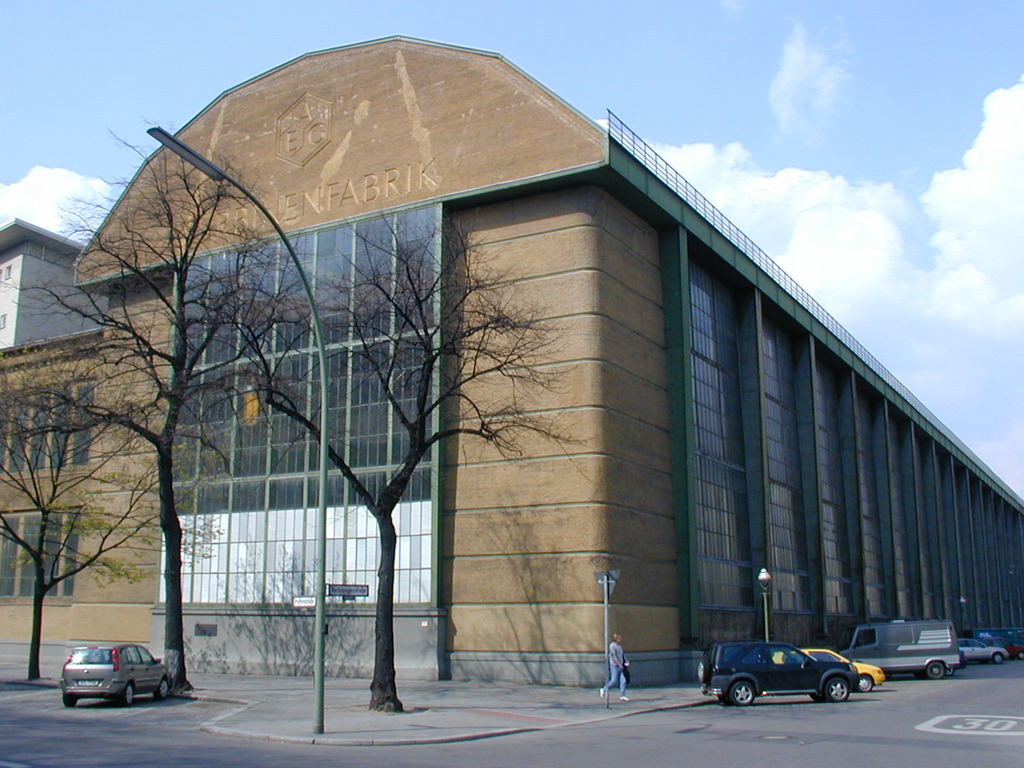
AEG turbine factory in Berlin, by Peter Behrens (1908–1909)

== Architecture and decoration ==
In Berlin, August Endell was both editor of Pan magazine and a major figure in Jugendstil decoration, designing hotels and theaters, such as the interior of Buntes Theater in Berlin (1901), destroyed during World War II. He designed every detail of the interior down to the nails, with each room in a different color, and on a different theme. He also designed the Hackesche Höfe, a complex of buildings in the centre of Berlin, noted for the imaginative details of the decoration, in spirals and curling forms.

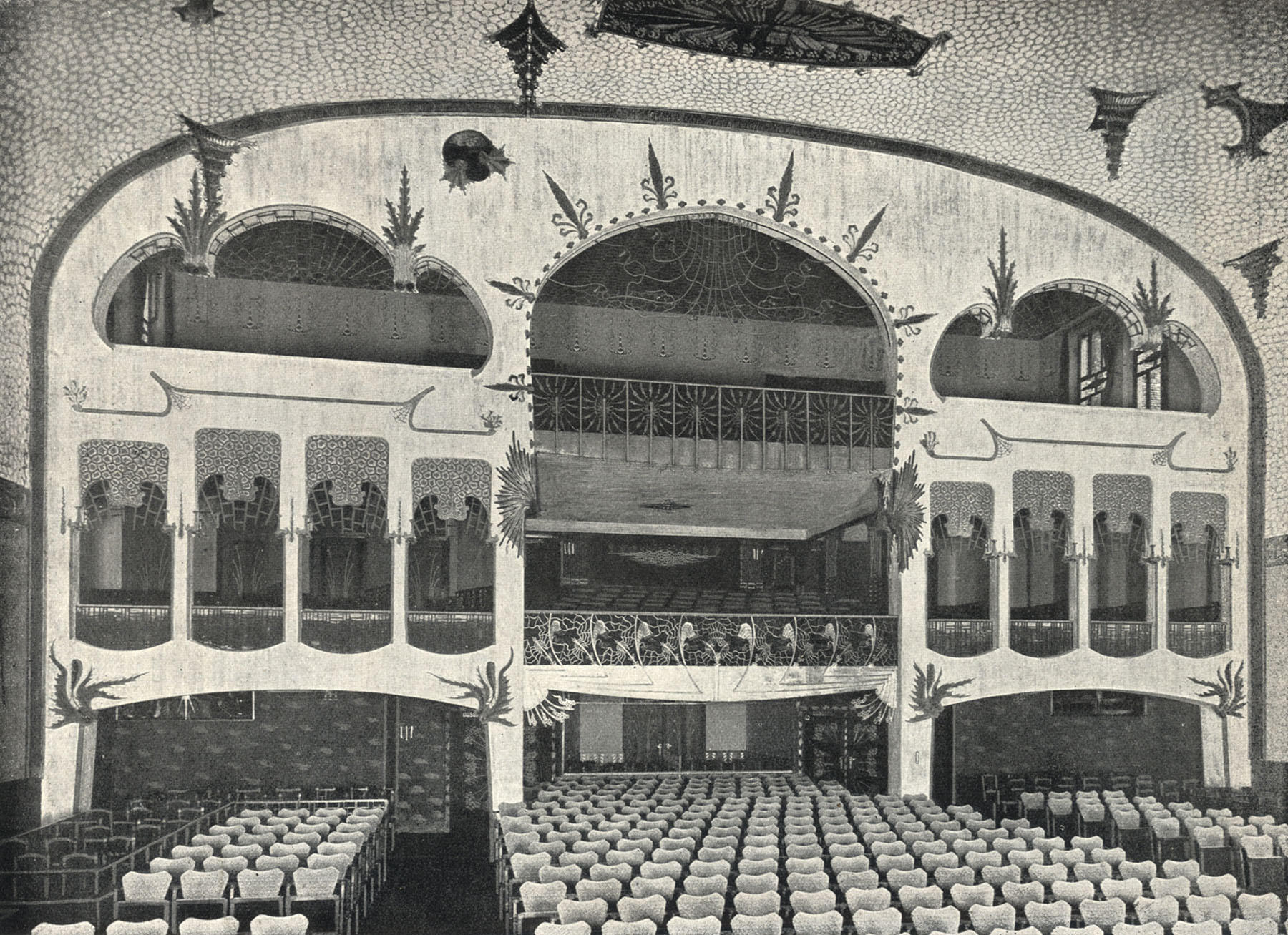
Buntes Theater, Berlin (1901) by August Endell

== Posters and graphic arts ==
The most prominent graphic artist was Otto Eckmann, who produced numerous illustrations for the movement's journal Jugend, in a sinuous, floral style that was similar to the French style. He also created a type style based upon Japanese calligraphy. Joseph Sattler was another graphic artist who contributed to the style through another artistic journal called Pan. Sattler designed a type face often used in Jugendstil.

Another important German graphic artist was Josef Rudolf Witzel (1867–1925), who produced many early covers for Jugend, with curving, floral forms which helped shape the style.

The magazine Simplicissimus, published in Munich, was also noted for its Jugendstil graphics, as well as for the modern writers it presented, including Thomas Mann and Rainer Maria Rilke. Important illustrators for the magazine included Thomas Theodor Heine.

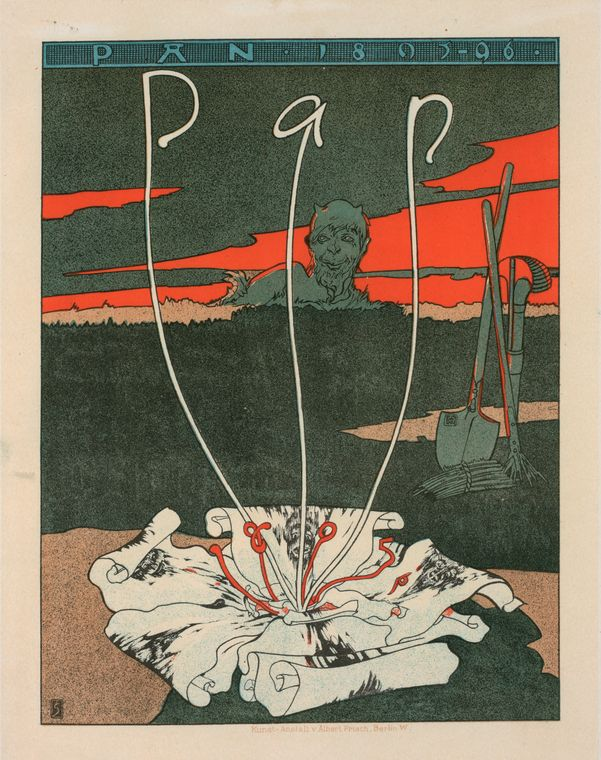
Cover of Pan magazine by Joseph Sattler (1895)

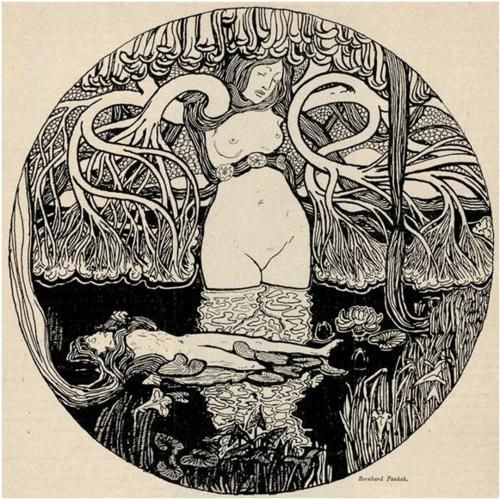
Illustration by Bernhard Pankok in Jugend (1896)

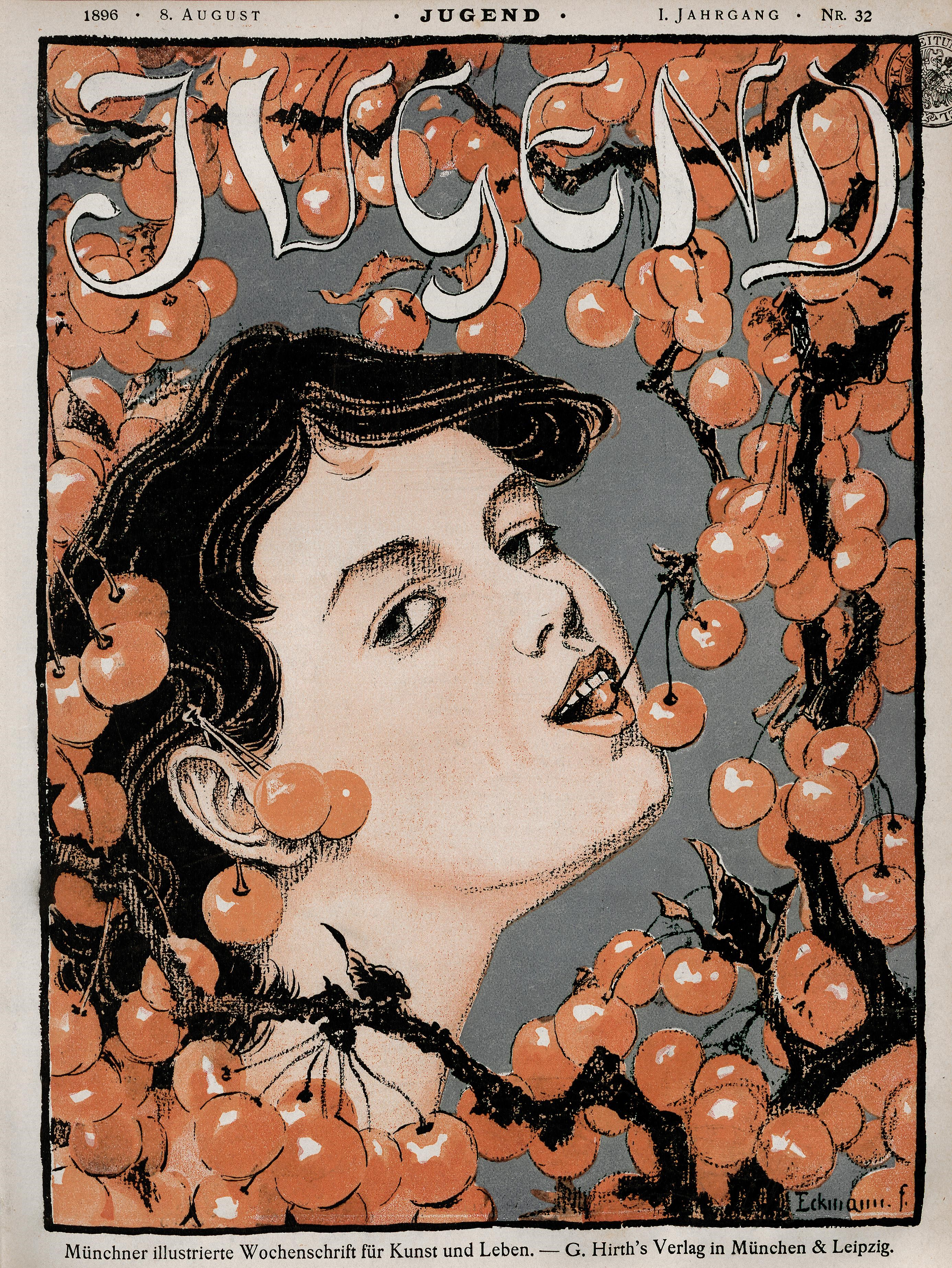
Cover of Jugend by Otto Eckmann (1896)

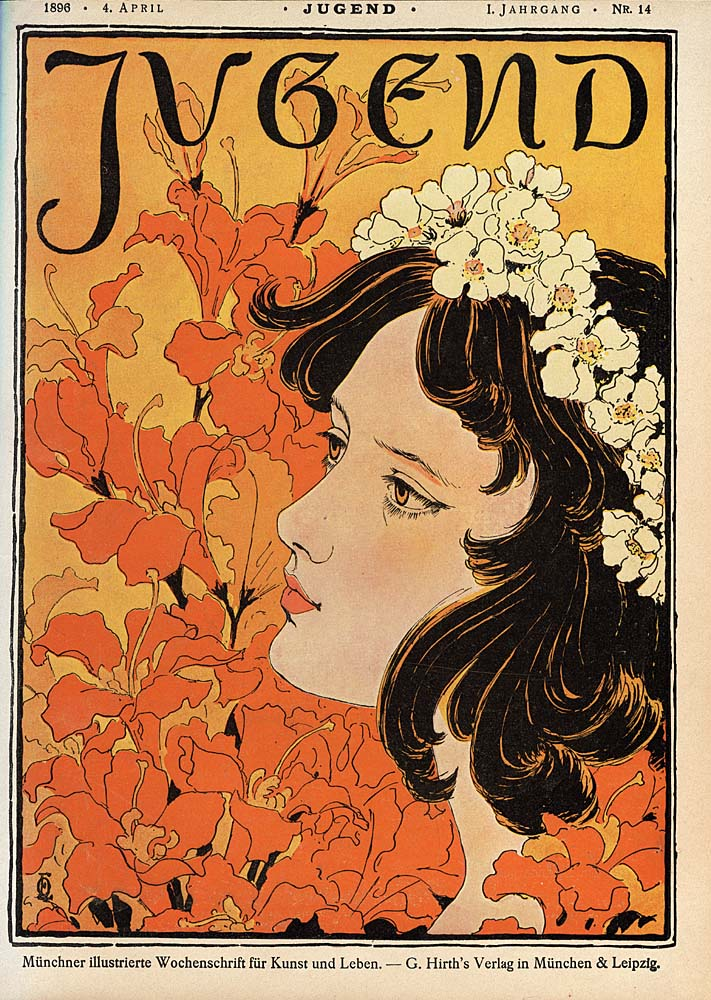
Cover of Jugend by Otto Eckmann (1896)

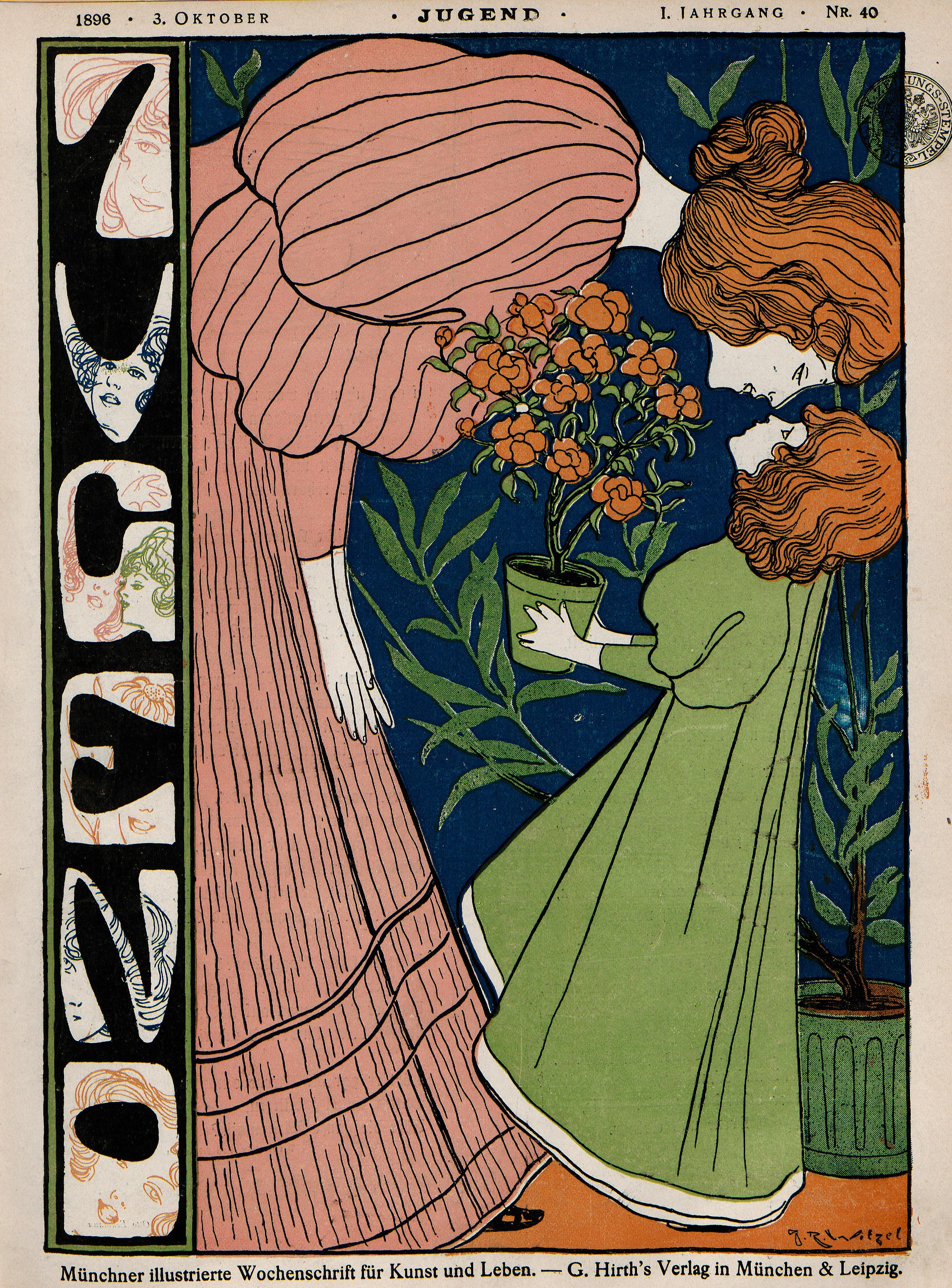
Cover of Jugend issue #40 by Josef Rudolf Witzel (1896)

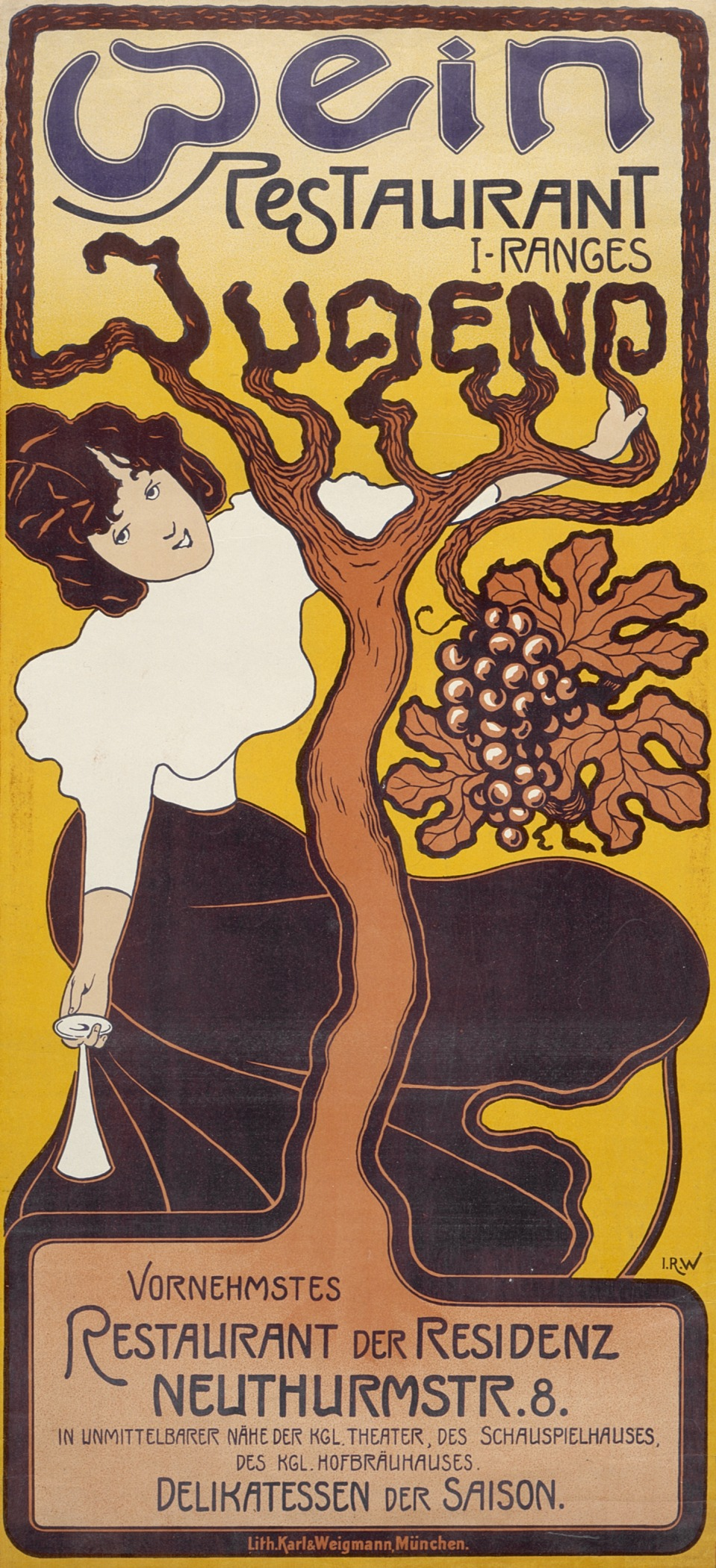
Restaurant poster by Josef Rudolf Witzel (1896)

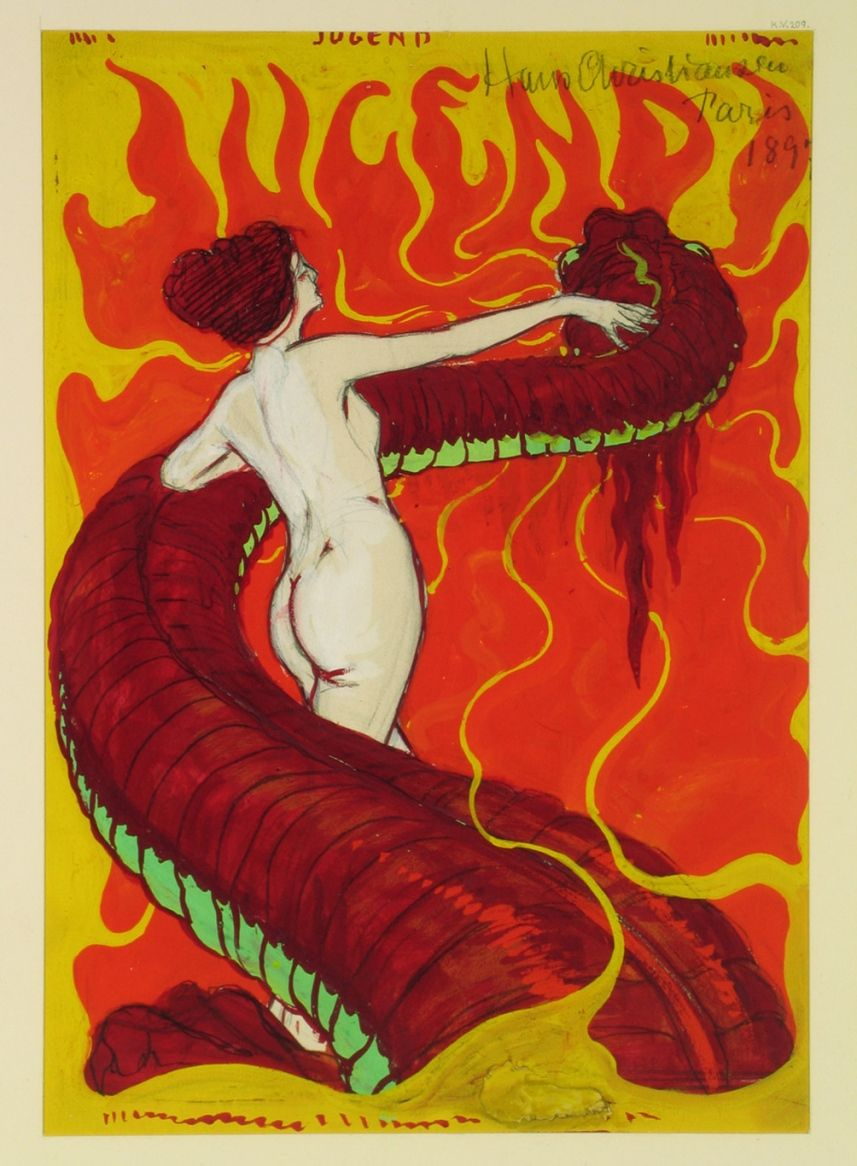
Andromedia, an illustration for Jugend by Hans Christiansen (1898)

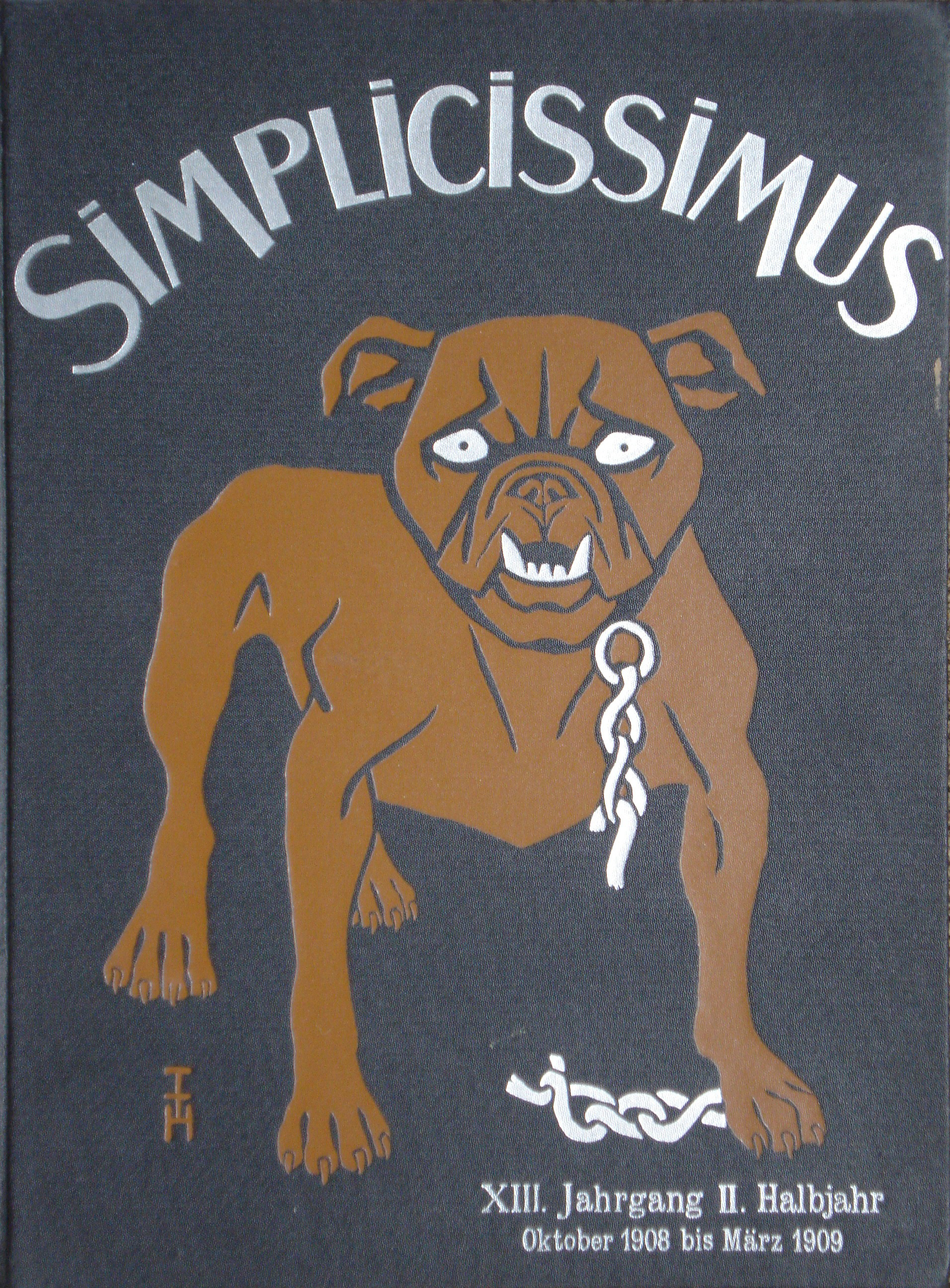
Simplicissimus cover by Thomas Theodor Heine (1905)

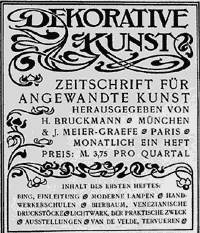
Masthead of Dekorative kunst, the Munich decorative arts magazine (1901)

== Furniture ==
The ideal of designers of the Jugendstil was to make a house a complete work of art, with everything inside, from the furniture to the carpets and the dishware, silverware and the art, in perfect harmony. With this ideal in mind, they established their own workshops to produce furniture.

August Endell, Theodor Fischer, Bruno Paul, and especially Richard Riemerschmid were important figures in Jugendstil furniture.

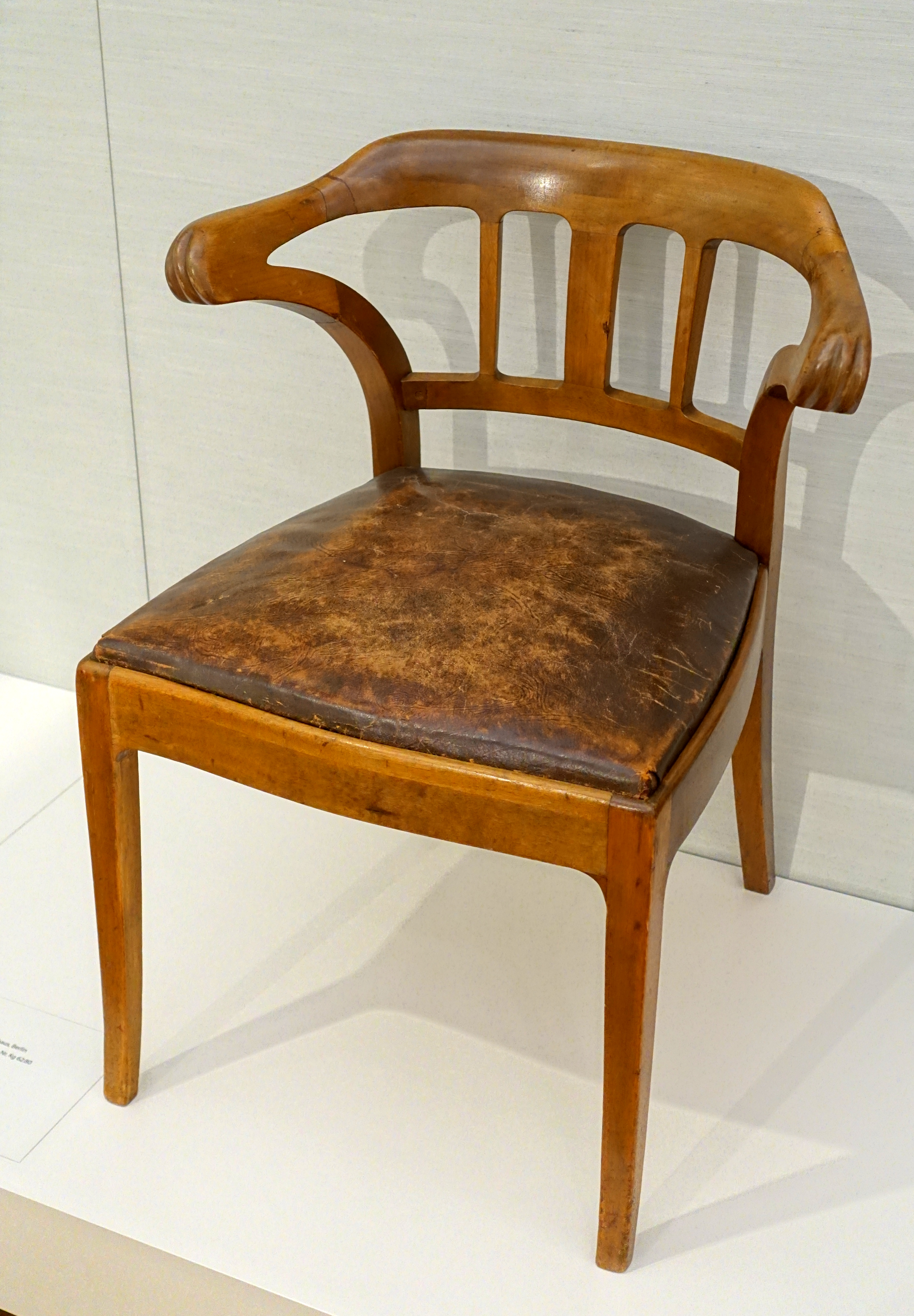
Maple wood and leather armchair by Otto Eckmann (1898)

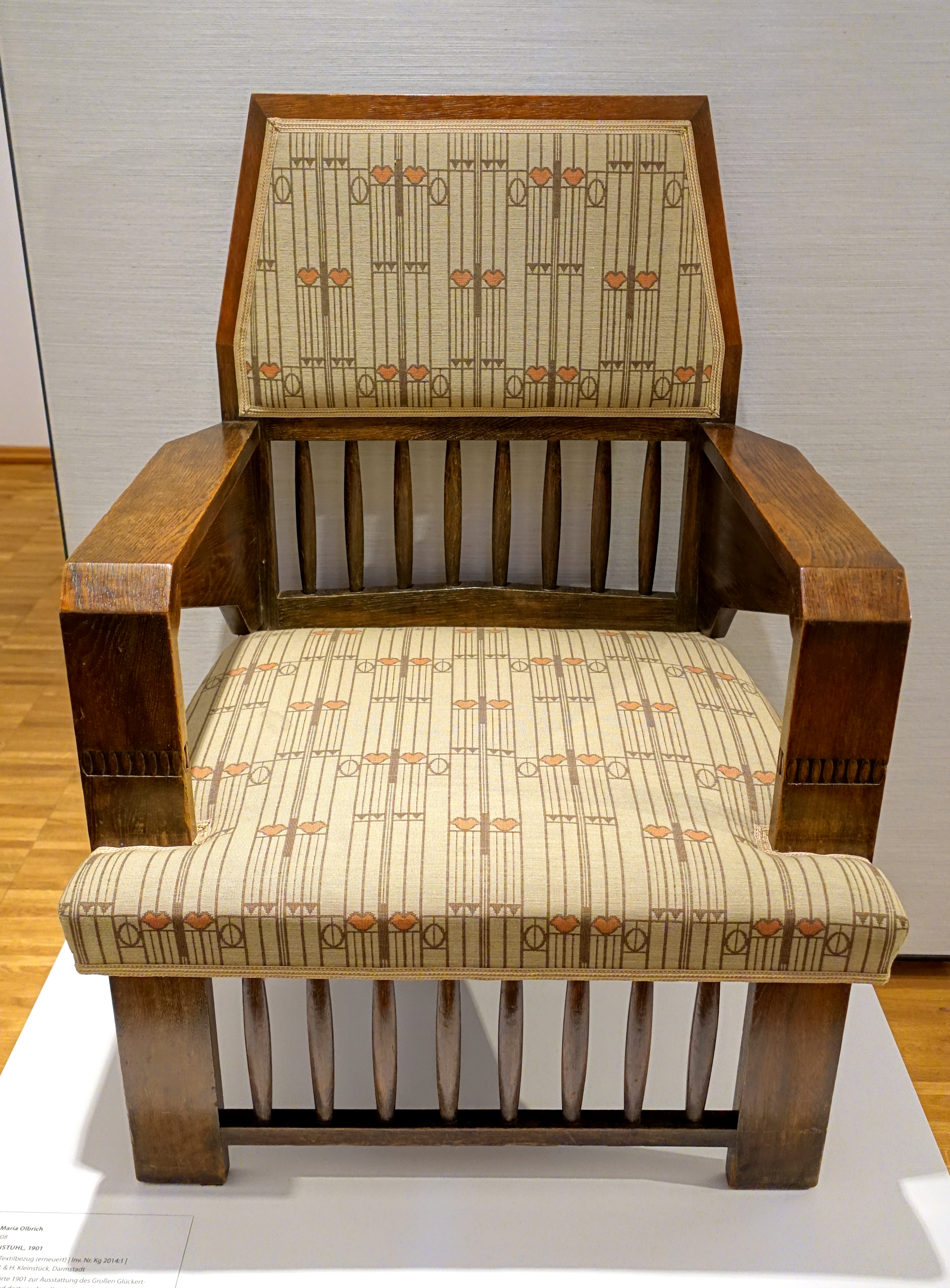
Armchair by Joseph Maria Olbrich, oak and textile (1901), Darmstadt Museum

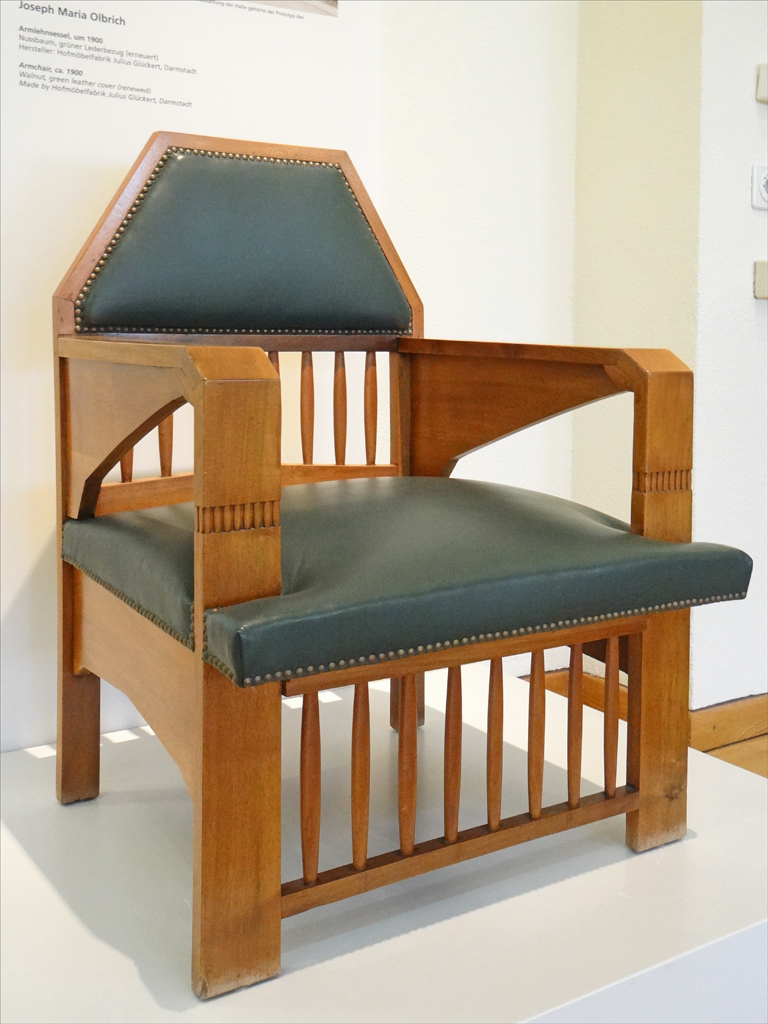
Armchair by Joseph Maria Olbrich, Darmstadt Museum

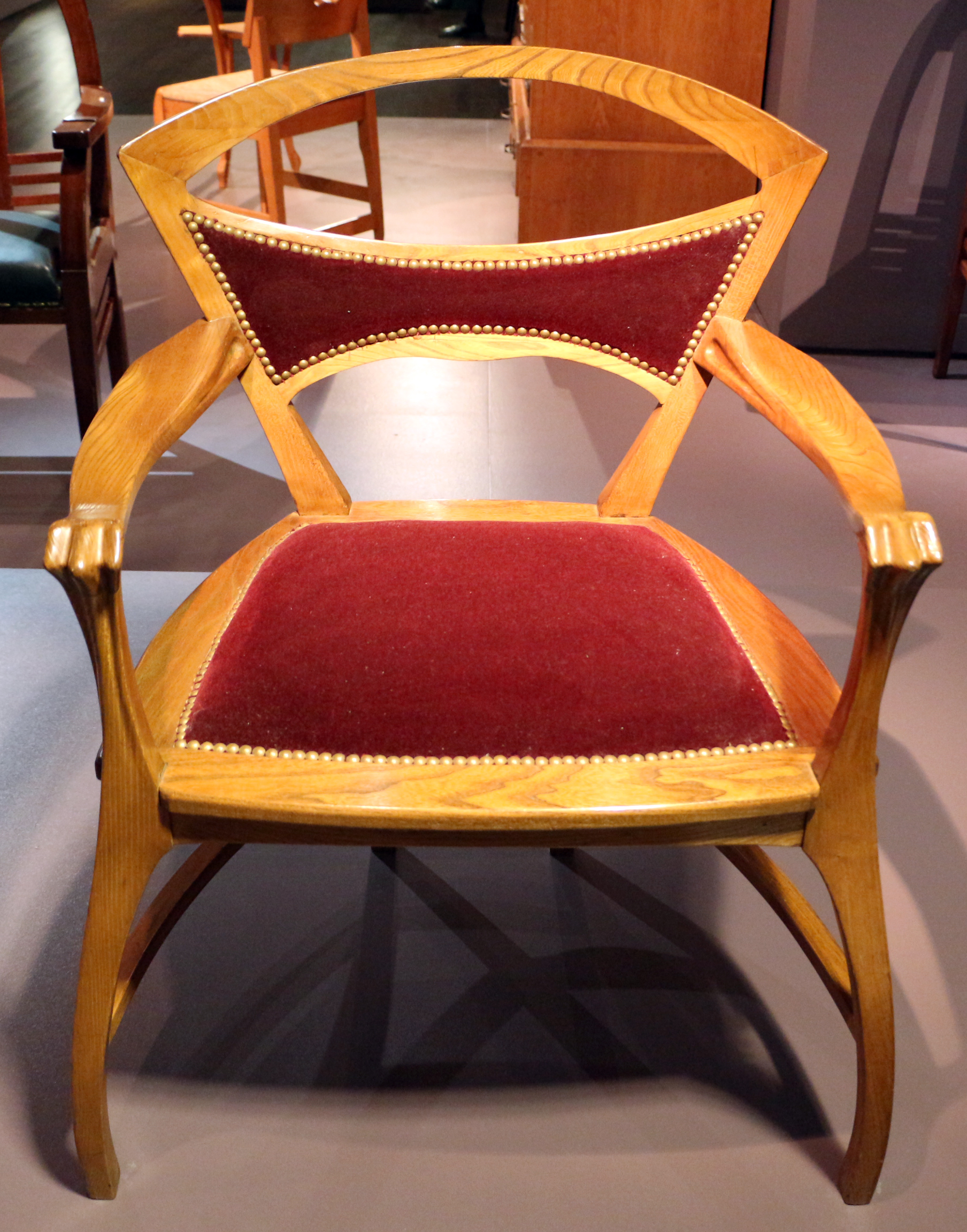
Chair by Bruno Paul (1900)

== Metalware ==
Metallwarenfabrik Straub & Schweizer (WMF) was, by 1900, the world's largest producer of household metalware, mainly in the Jugendstil style, designed in the WMF Art Studio under Albert Mayer. WMF purchased Orivit, another company known for its Jugendstil pewter, in 1905.

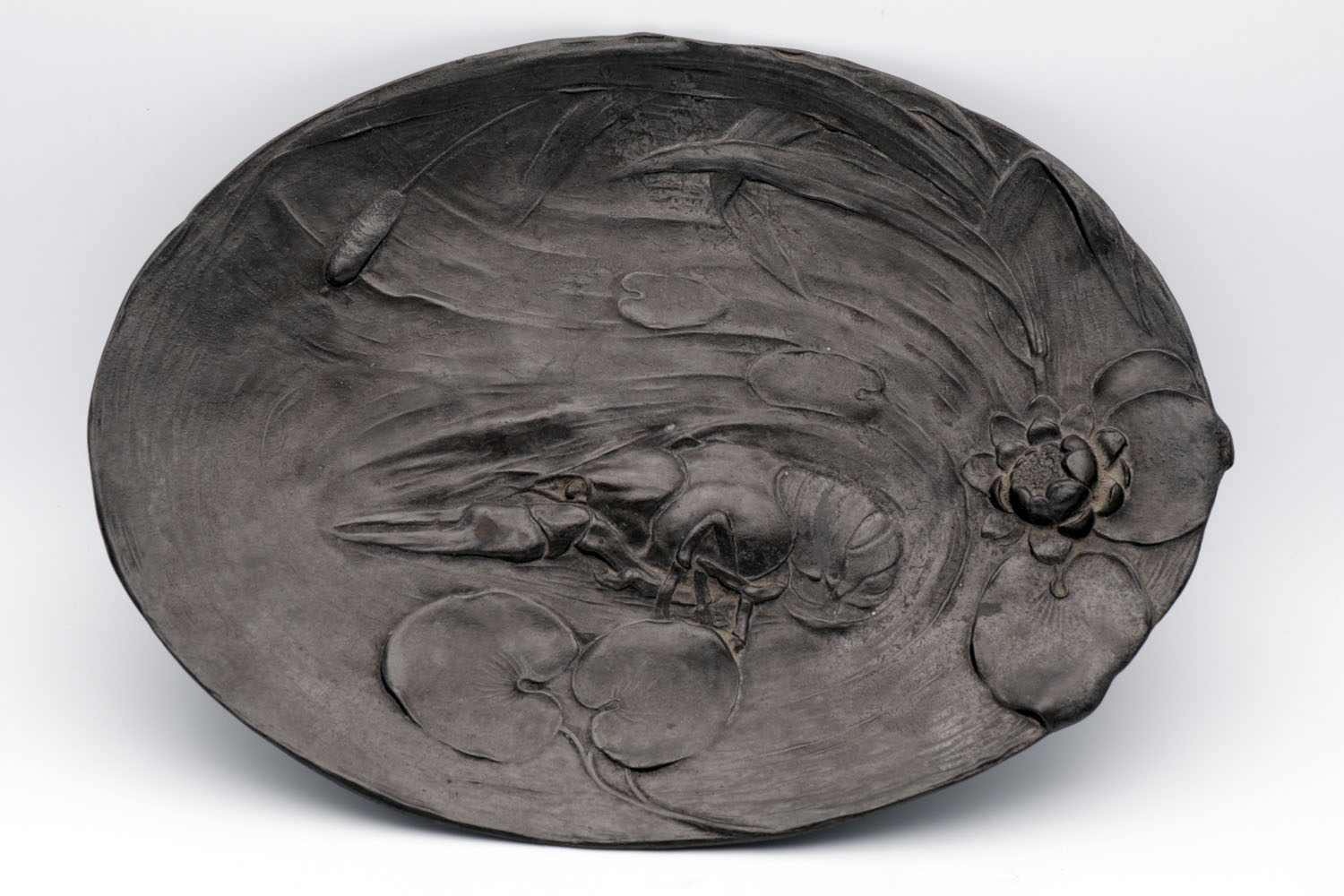
Orivit pewter Jugendstil calling card tray. Design no. 2043. c.1900

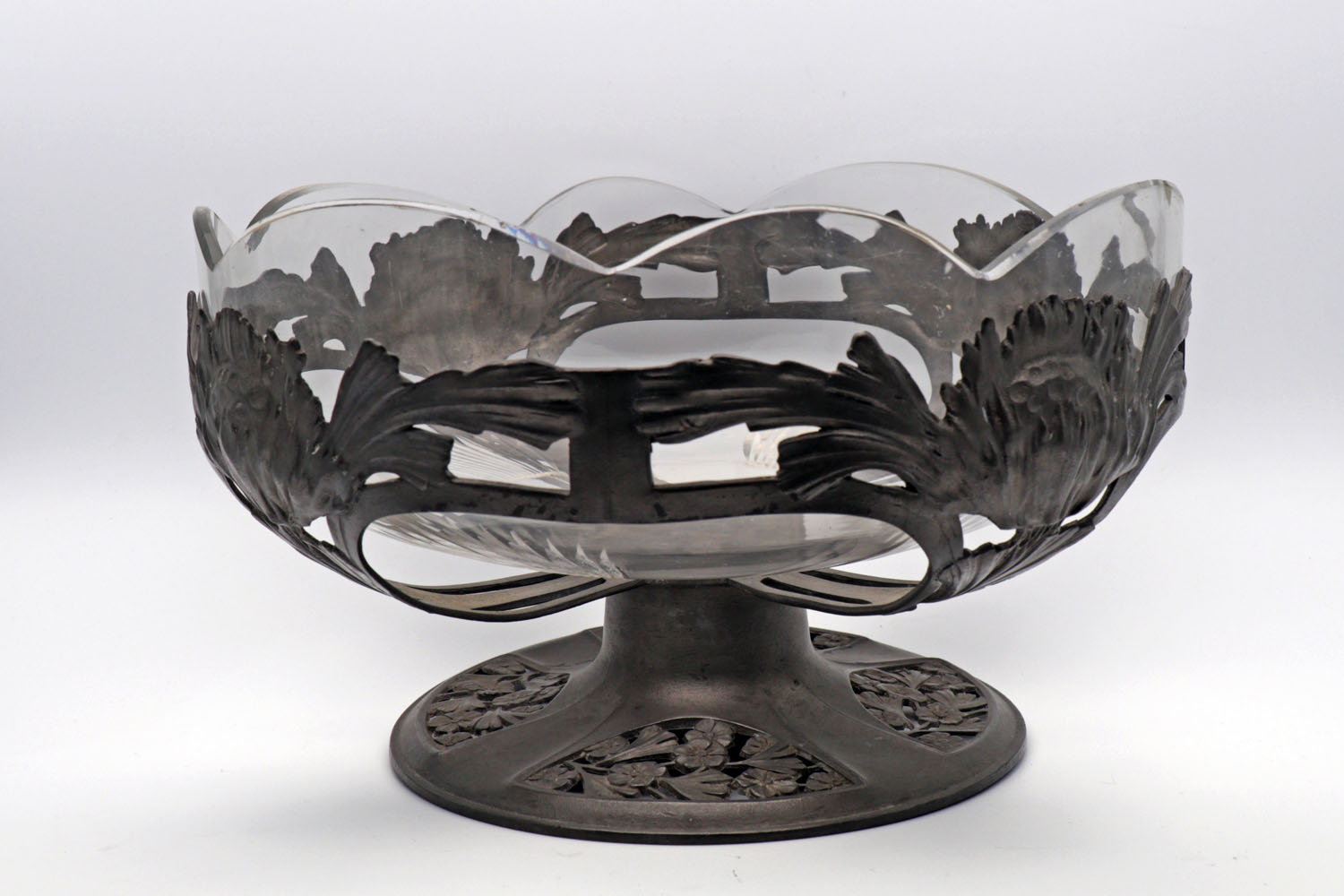
Orivit Jugendstil pewter bowl with glass liner. c.1900

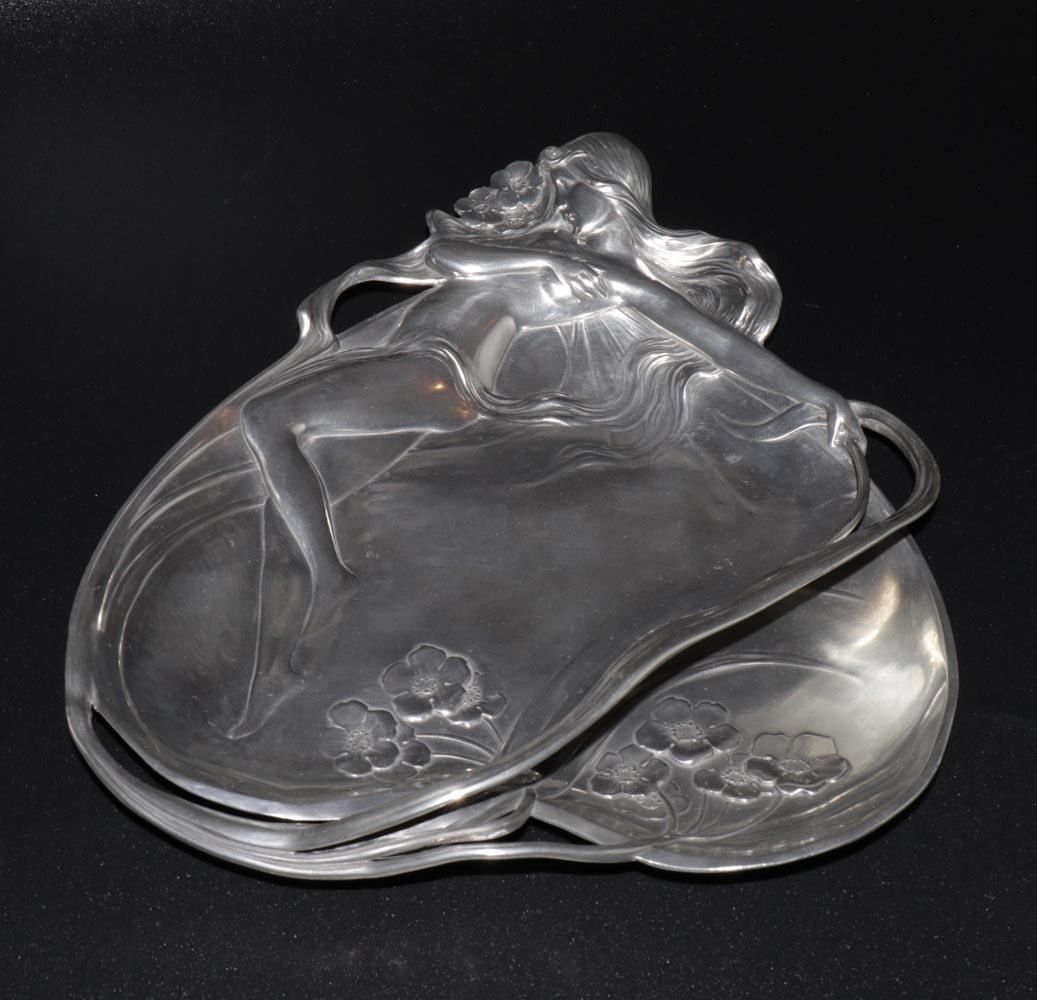
WMF Jugendstil pewter dish. Design no.232. c.1906

== Bibliography ==
- Bony, Anne (2012). L'Architecture Moderne (in French). Larousse. ISBN 978-2-03-587641-6.
- Lahor, Jean (2007) [1901]. L'Art nouveau (in French). Baseline Co. Ltd. ISBN 978-1-85995-667-0.
- Ormiston, Rosalind; Robinson, Michael (2013). Art Nouveau – Posters, Illustration and Fine Art. Flame Tree Publishing. ISBN 978-1-84786-280-8.
- Sembach, Klaus-Jürgen (2013). L'Art Nouveau- L'Utopie de la Réconciliation (in French). Taschen. ISBN 978-3-8228-3005-5.
