= Klingspor Type Foundry =

Gebrüder Klingspor
- Company type: Aktiengesellschaft
- Industry: Type foundry
- Founded: 1906; 120 years ago
- Founder: Carl Klingspor
- Defunct: 1956; 70 years ago
- Headquarters: Offenbach am Main, Germany
- Key people: Rudolf Koch, Walter Tiemann, Otto Eckmann

The Klingspor Type Foundry was a German hot metal type foundry established in 1892 when Carl Klingspor bought out the Rudhard’sche Foundry of Offenbach. His sons, Karl and younger brother Wilhelm, took on the business in 1904, renaming the foundry Gebrüder Klingspor in 1906, and turned it into a major concern. Famous type designers like Rudolf Koch, Walter Tiemann and Otto Eckmann worked for this foundry and created well known typefaces like Koch Antiqua, Wilhelm Klingspor, Tiemann Antiqua and Eckmann.

Starting in 1925, Klingspor types were distributed in the United States by Continental Type Founders Association.

The foundry closed in 1956 when it was acquired by D. Stempel AG, which had held a majority stake in the company since 1917. The right of the typefaces was transferred to D. Stempel AG, Frankfurt am Main which then had been transferred to Linotype. Many original designs can be seen in the Klingspor Museum in Offenbach am Main.

== Typefaces ==
These foundry types were produced by the Klingspor Foundry:

- Behrens Roman (1900, Peter Behrens)
- Daphnis (1931, Walter Tiemann)
- Duo (1954, A. Finsterer)
- Eckmann (1900, Otto Eckmann)
- Figura (1955, Alfred Finsterer)
- Folkwang (1954 - 55, Hermann Schardt)
- Hammer Uncial (1923, Victor Hammer)
- Jessen (1930, Rudolf Koch)
- Kabel + Light Italic + Bold (1927-29, Rudolf Koch)
- Koch Antiqua (1922, Rudolf Koch), also known as Locarno and sold in the United States as Eve.
- Narcissus (1923, Walter Tiemann)
- Neuland + Inline (1923, Rudolf Koch)
- Windisch cursive (1917, Albert Windisch)
- Zeppelin (1927-29, Rudolf Koch)
