= Rudolf Koch =

German type designer and calligrapher

- Born: 20 November 1876
- Died: 9 April 1934 (aged 57)
- Occupation(s): typeface designer, professor
- Known for: Neuland, Kabel
- Movement: Offenbach School

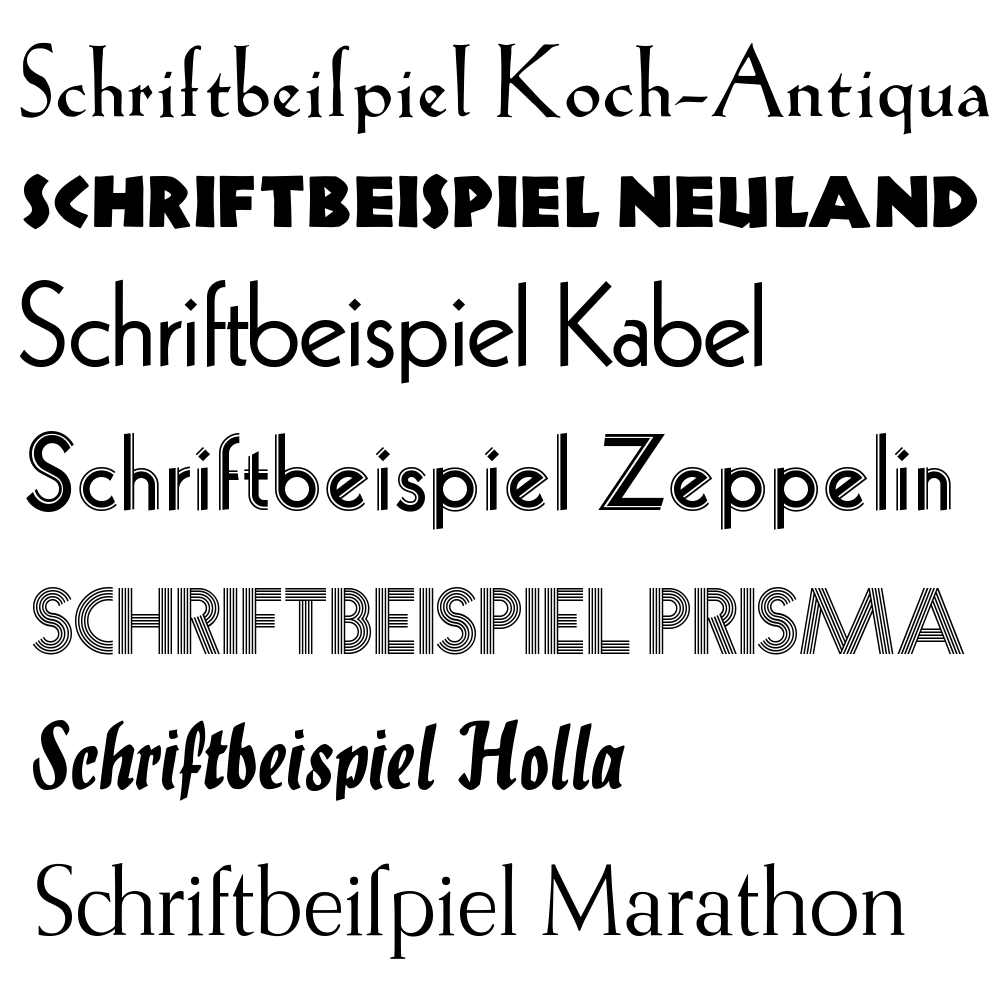
Non-blackletter fonts designed by Rudolf Koch

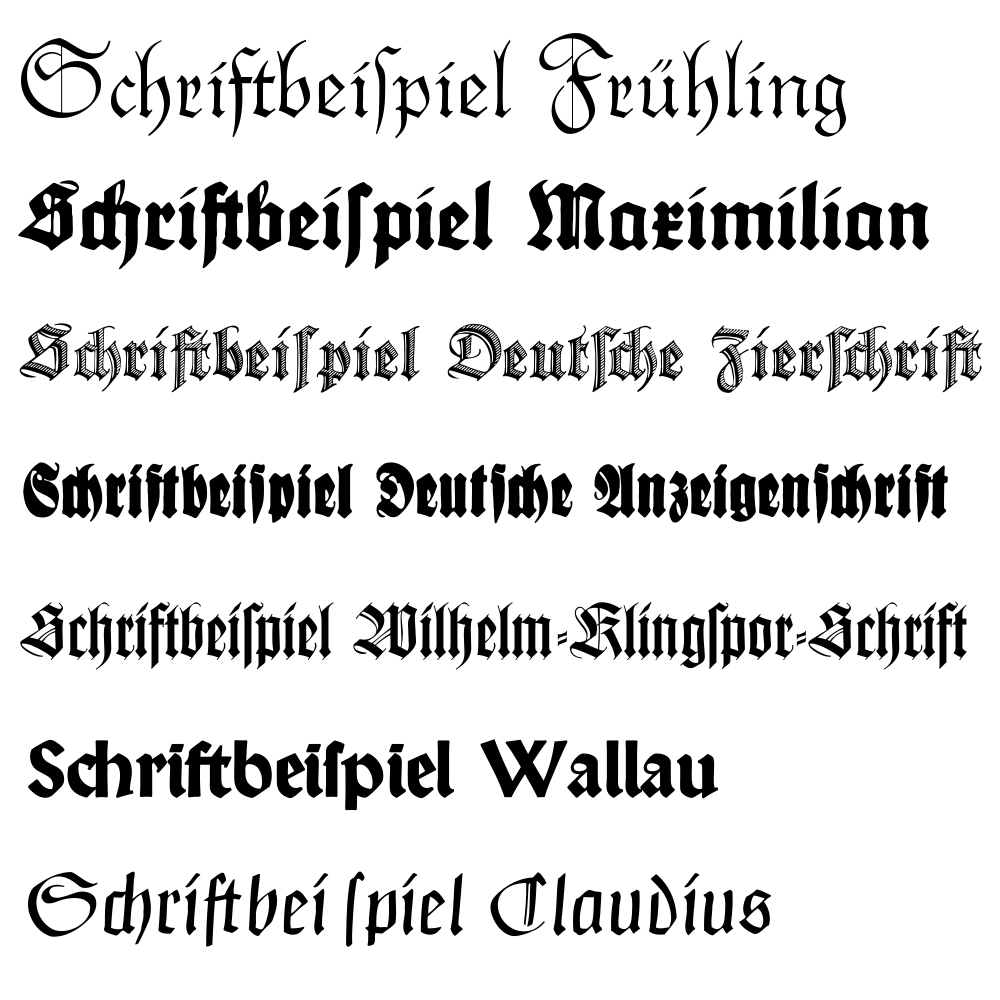
Fraktur fonts by Rudolf Koch

Rudolf Koch (20 November 1876 – 9 April 1934) was a German type designer, professor, and a master of lettering, calligraphy, typography and illustration. Commonly known for his typefaces created for the Klingspor Type Foundry, his most widely used typefaces include Neuland and Kabel.

== Overview ==
Koch spent his teenage years working in Hanau as an apprentice in a metal goods workshop, whilst also attending art school, where he learned to draw, and soon after went to the Academy of Fine Arts, Nuremberg. Between 1897 and 1906, he worked for various businesses in the book trade in Leipzig, illustrating and designing book covers in the Art Nouveau style that was popular at the time. In 1906, Koch began working for the Rudhard Type foundry in Offenbach, later known as the Klingspor Type foundry. Other notable designers who worked for the foundry include Otto Eckmann and Peter Behrens.

Koch was deeply spiritual and a devout Lutheran, spending much of his time working on religious publications and manuscripts, of which he completed nearly a hundred in his lifetime. Koch viewed the alphabet as humanity's ultimate achievement. He died prematurely of a heart attack in 1934, aged 57.

== Career and influences ==
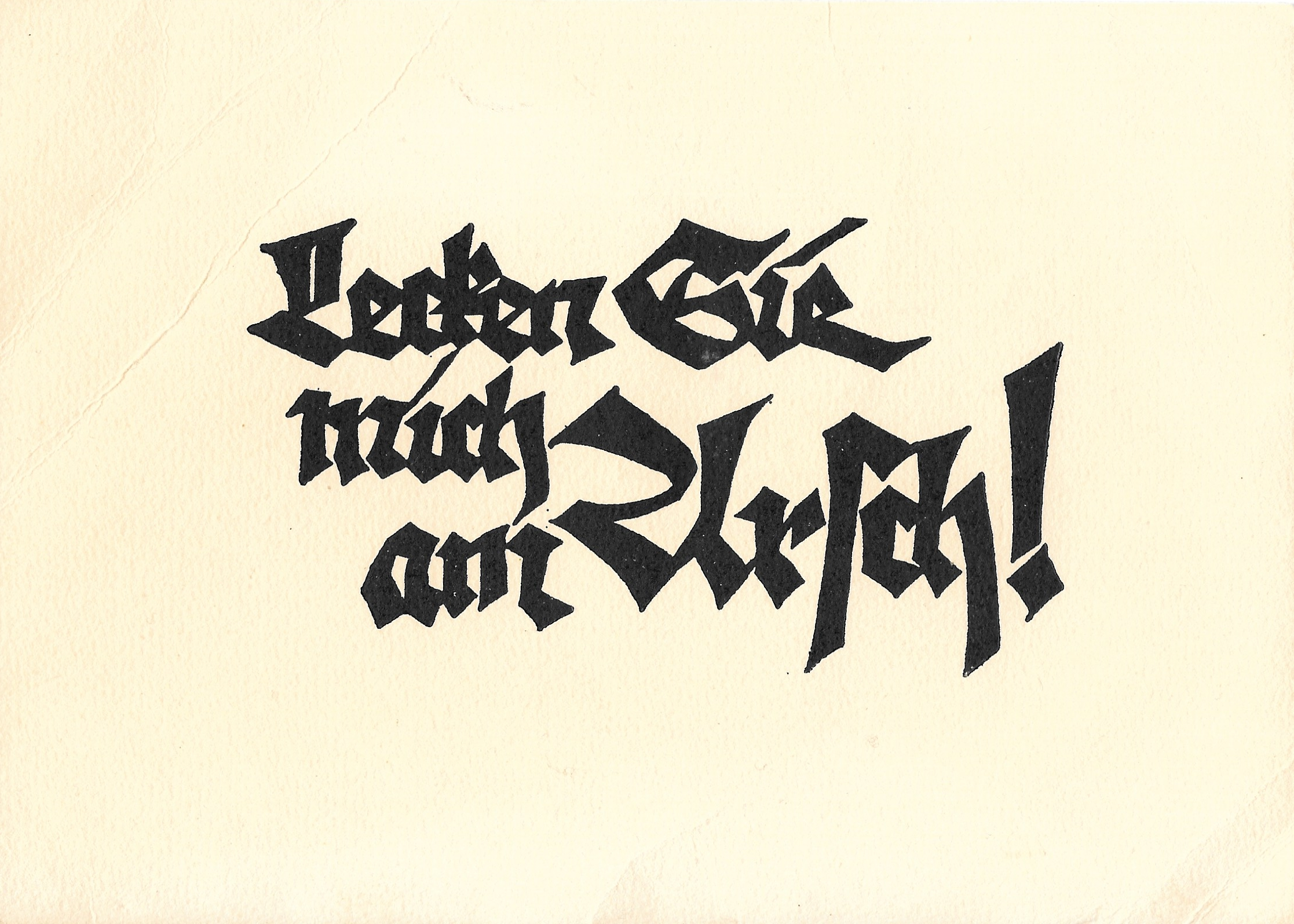
A postcard Rudolf Koch used to send when asked for a free sample of his art: "Lecken Sie mich am Arsch!" (German: "Kiss my arse!", literally "Lick me on the arse!" in formal imperative mood)

Koch greatly admired William Morris. Speaking at a meeting in London, he expressed his disbelief that Morris was not of German descent: "I feel such a closeness to him that I always have the feeling that he cannot be an Englishman, he must be a German."

The teachings of Morris and the Arts and Crafts Movement are evident in Koch's use of hand-lettering and wood-cutting techniques. At the same time, his book illustrations are evocative of Art Nouveau. Koch prized craftsmanship in his type design and printing methods, a principle deeply rooted in the Arts and Crafts Movement. Yet Koch was working in a period of rapid development in print technology, which saw the invention of the Linotype machine in 1886, the Monotype System in 1887, and the offset press in 1907, all of which were antithetical to his artisanal ethos.

Koch lectured at the Arts and Crafts School in Offenbach. In 1918, after World War I, he opened a workshop training students in typography, calligraphy, wood-cutting, and other crafts. Best known for his calligraphic talent he built upon the calligraphic tradition by creating an original, simple expression from his materials.

Many of Koch's blackletter typefaces, such as Kochschrift and Willhelm Klingspor Gotisch, were greatly influenced by hand-written manuscripts and Gothic letterforms, a style that originated in Germany. Known also for his nationalistic ideology, he wrote in Der Deutsche, "Even as a boy I wanted to become a proper real German. I hated anything that was foreign, and even as I was growing up I felt this was a sign of true loyalty."

Koch frequently defended Germanic blackletter script in the journals and publications he contributed to. He also held exhibitions with his group Offenbach Schreiber, which promoted hand lettering and calligraphy, and in these, he expressed the revival of traditional lettering. Koch worked closely with bookbinder Ignatz Wiemeler, and together they created the "Offenbach Typography Style" of bookbindings.

Koch's dedication to Gothic script may have limited his recognition in English-speaking countries. His work was also part of the painting event in the art competition at the 1928 Summer Olympics.

Koch wrote a book containing 493 old-world symbols, monograms, and runes entitled The Book of Signs (reprinted in 1955, in the Dover Pictorial Archive Series). Hermann Zapf was a huge admirer of Koch, and took great inspiration from his work after acquiring a copy of his book Das Schreiben als Kunstfertigkeit (Writing as a Skill).

== Typefaces ==
Koch's first non-blackletter typeface was the delicate roman Koch-Antiqua, a display face with a low x-height. Its oblique features inline capitals in the larger sizes, an idea inspired by the traditions of blackletter capitals.

Koch designed the Neuland typeface in 1923. Taking a more experimental turn, the typeface counterpoints his preferred traditional style with a more contemporary feel. Dr Klingspor called it "unbearably ugly", despite its great commercial success.

Koch introduced his first sans-serif typeface, Kabel, in 1927, which is similar to Paul Renner's Futura, designed the same year. The differences between the two typefaces are most noticeable in Kabel's far-reaching terminal on the 'a' and the 'e', as well as the slanted crossbar and the loop of the 'g'.

Typefaces designed by Koch include:

- Claudius (1931–1934)
- Deutsche Anzeigenschrift (1923–1924)
- Deutsche Schrift (1908–1921)
- Deutsche Zierschrift (1921)
- Grotesk-Initialen (1933)
- Holla (1932)
- Jessen (1924–1930)
- Kabel (1927–1929)
- Koch Antiqua / Locarno (1922), sold by Continental Type in the United States as Eve
- Koch Current (1933)
- Marathon (1930–1938)
- Maximilian Antiqua (1913–17)
- Neufraktur (1933–1934)
- Neuland (1922–1923)
- Offenbach (1928)
- Prisma (1931)
- Wallau (1925–1934)
- Wilhelm Klingspor-Schrift (1920–1926)
- Zeppelin / Kabel Inline (1929)

== Notable publications ==
Some of Koch's most well known works include:

- Das Schreiben als Kunstfertigkeit [Writing As A Skill]. Leipzig, Germany: Verlag des Deutschen Buchgewerbe-Verein. 1921.
- Das ABC-Büchlein (The Little ABC Book)
- Das Blumenbuch (The Flower Book)
- Das Zeichenbuch (The Book of Signs)
- Klassiche Schriften (Classic Lettering)
