= Otto Eckmann =

German painter and graphic artist

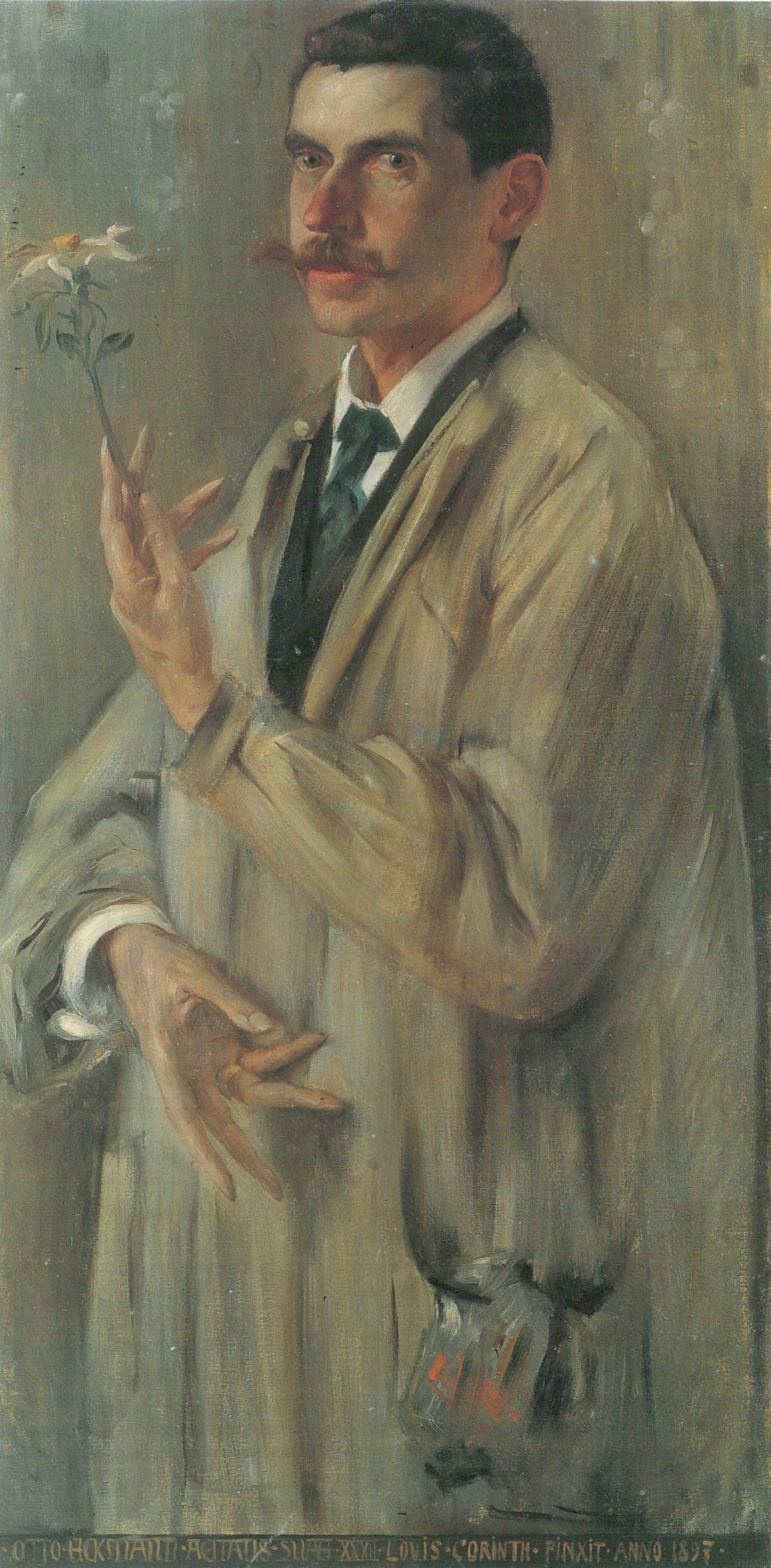
Otto Eckmann by Lovis Corinth

Otto Eckmann (19 November 1865 – 11 June 1902) was a German painter and graphic artist. He was a prominent member of the "floral" branch of Jugendstil. He created the Eckmann typeface, which was based on Japanese calligraphy and medieval font design.

== Biography ==
Otto Eckmann was born in the Free and Hanseatic City of Hamburg, Germany in 1865. He studied at the Kunstgewerbeschule in Hamburg and Nuremberg and at the academy in Munich. In 1894, Eckmann gave up painting (and auctioned off his works) in order to concentrate on applied design. He began producing graphic work for the magazines Pan in 1895 and Jugend which had roughly 20,000 readers every week in 1896. He also designed book covers for the publishers Cotta, Diederichs, Scherl and Seemann, as well as the logo for the publishing house S. Fischer Verlag. Eckmann used woodblock print for his work on Jugend magazine similar to japanese woodblock prints and later-adapted French styles. Eckmann's work differed from others in the Art Nouveau movement in that he used dimensionality in his designs, where most designers used a flat look Eckmann's work shows a clear background, middle-ground and foreground.

In 1897 he taught ornamental painting at the Unterrichtsanstalt des Königlichen Kunstgewerbemuseums in Berlin. In 1899, he designed the logo for the magazine Die Woche. From 1900 to 1902, Eckmann did graphic work for the Allgemeine Elektrizitätsgesellschaft (AEG). During this time, he designed the fonts Eckmann (in 1900) and Fette Eckmann (in 1902), probably the most common Jugendstil fonts still in use. Eckmann was also proficient in tile design and furniture design.

Eckmann died of the tuberculosis that had plagued him for years on 11 June 1902, at age 37 in Badenweiler, Germany.

== Style and works ==
Otto Eckmann was skilled in many areas of art and design including tile, textile, embroidery, furniture, and painting. Eckmann worked as a painter from his education in 1865 to 1894 when he changed careers to focus on applied design. Few works from this time remain. Of what does remain there is pottery, painting, sculpture and textile. More works remain from after his shift to applied design. Eckmann's work as part of the Arts and Crafts movement, Art Nouveau, and its German counterpart jugendstil. Much of Eckmann's work depicted swans, as well as women. The latter was common for the Art Nouveau movement, however Eckmann's love of swans was more personal but expanded to all of jugendstil, becoming a common subject of works in the movement and serving as a symbol for it. Eckmann's work has been auctioned many times with prices ranging from US$216 to US$16,250.

== See also ==
- List of German painters
- Art Nouveau posters and graphic arts
