= Gulbransson =

Gulbransson is a surname. Notable people with the surname include:

- Grete Gulbransson (1882–1934), Austrian writer and poet
- Olaf Andreas Gulbransson (1916–1961), German architect of Norwegian descent
- Olaf Gulbransson (1873–1958), Norwegian artist, painter, and designer

== See also ==
- Gulbranson
