= Republic without republicans =

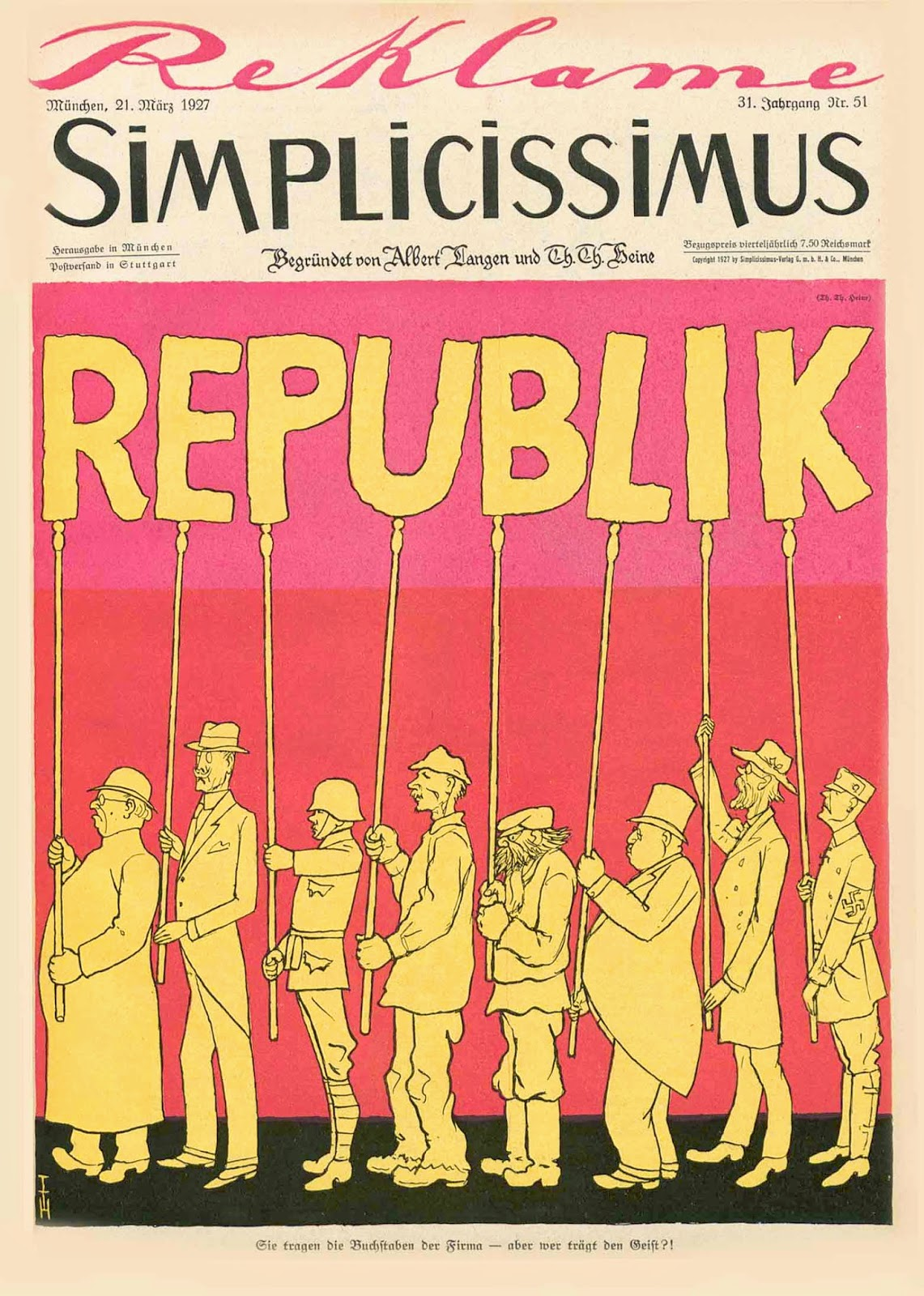
The 1927 Simplicissimus cartoon commonly associated with the concept of a 'republic without republicans'.

The term republic without republicans refers to a situation in which a state is a republic, yet there is little or no supporting republicanism to be found amongst the population and/or the political elite. In such a situation, most people would actually prefer to found a new monarchy or restore an abolished dynasty, or – in a broader sense – oppose democracy.

== Germany ==
In historiography, the Weimar Republic (1919–1933) is often branded a republic without republicans. According to professor of modern European history Jeffrey Herf of the University of Maryland, College Park, this is because nobody in interwar Germany from the political right, centre or left was really pleased with it:

1. Right-wing intellectuals and political parties rejected parliamentary democracy as un-German, and associated the Weimar Republic with national humiliation and the military defeat of World War I;
2. Disappointed social democrats felt compelled to found a democracy together with the right on socially conservative foundations, because of the threat of a radical left communist revolution;
3. Communists felt that the social democrats had betrayed the labour movement, and that the Weimar Republic barely improved social conditions. They continued plotting the launch of a revolution to establish a soviet republic (as had been briefly achieved in 1919 in Munich and Bremen).

This lack of commitment to, and even opposition to, republican and democratic values in society, primarily coming from what is termed the 'conservative revolution', would largely pave the way for Adolf Hitler's Nazi Party to seize power in 1933, replacing the Weimar Republic with the Third Reich.

A famous historical cartoon by Thomas Theodor Heine that strengthens the idea of a republicanless Weimar Republic appeared in the magazine Simplicissimus of 21 March 1927: Germans from different social classes are carrying the letters "REPUBLIK"; the adjoining caption reads: Sie tragen die Buchstaben der Firma – aber wer trägt den Geist? ("They are carrying the company's letters, but who is carrying the spirit?").

The term itself is much older than interwar Germany. In 1804, the German reactionary monarchist August von Kotzebue already called the Cisrhenian Republic (1797–1802) a Republik ohne Republikaner.

== France ==
At the opening of the British House of Commons on 1 February 1849, Benjamin Disraeli, one of the three Conservative opposition leaders, said about the French Second Republic (1848–1852):

Look at the state of France, look at the state of the whole centre of Europe... I find in France a Republic without Republicans, in Germany an Empire without an Emperor, and this is progress!!...

The term has also been applied to the French Third Republic (1870–1940) in 1873.
