= Franz Schoenberner =

German editor and writer

Franz Schoenberner (December 18, 1892 – April 11, 1970) was a German editor and writer.

== Life and works ==
Franz Schoenberner grew up as the eleventh child of a pastor in Berlin. From 1911 to 1914, he studied literature and art history in Berlin and Munich. From 1923 to 1925, he was editor of the Auslandpost, the literary supplement of the Allgemeine Zeitung and the weekly radio Süddeutscher Rundfunk. In 1927, he was the successor of Georg Hirth as editor of the Art Nouveau journal Jugend. Schoenberner became an associate of Thomas Theodor Heine and from November 1929 to March 1933, the last editor of Simplicissimus, before Hitler's seizure of power. The editors and authors of Simplicissimus came into conflict with the Nazi's and many fled Germany for their lives. Schoenberner and his wife, novelist Ellie Nerac, followed Heine on 20 March 1933 to exile in Switzerland and then to France where he lived in Roquebrune-Cap-Martin on the French Riviera. During this time he published articles in Klaus Mann's exile magazine Die Sammlung and the social democratic Zurcher Zeitung.

After war broke out in 1939, he was re-located to France, where he was interned as an "alien enemy". His detention camp was the former brick works Les Milles, in Toulon. There he met many artists and writers, such as Max Ernst, Walter Hasenclever and Lion Feuchtwanger. In 1941, he fled with the help of the refugee organization "Emergency Rescue Committee" to Marseille, then Lisbon and on to New York City. In New York he published the first volume of his memoirs Confessions of a European Intellectual (1946) which described his years in Germany. The second volume, The Inside Story of an Outsider, was published in 1949, about his eight years in exile.

In 1951, he fell down a flight of stairs after an assault, and spent rest of his life in a wheelchair paralyzed from the waist down. His experience and thoughts were worked into the third volume of his memoirs, You Still Have Your Head: Excursions from Immobility.

In 1965 Schoenberner returned to Germany on a visit, after 32 years away from his home country. He died in 1970, in Teaneck, New Jersey.

== Works ==
- Confessions of a European Intellectual. New York: MacMillan 1946.
- The Inside Story of an Outsider. New York: MacMillan 1949.
- You Still Have Your Head: Excursions from Immobility. New York: MacMillan 1957.
- Der Weg der Vernunft und andere Aufsätze. Icking und München: Kreisselmeier Verlag 1969.
