= Vorarlberg State Library =

Austrian library

Coordinates: 47°29′38″N 9°44′43″E

The Vorarlberg State Library (Vorarlberger Landesbibliothek) is a regional academic library in Bregenz, Western Austria. It founded in 1904 as a branch of the Vorarlberg State Archives. Granted autonomous status in September 1977, the library became subordinate to the Vorarlberg State Government.

The library's collections emphasize Vorarlberg regional studies and literature from and about Vorarlberg. Its Franz Michael Felder Archives serve as a central collection ................. for Vorarlberg literature. In the mediatheque audiovisual media (television and radio broadcasts) specialize in the documentation of regional events and history. Along with printed materials the library offers a broad range of audio recordings and music CDs, DVD specialist videos, films and audio books.

The library's OPAC (Online Public Access Catalogue) is frequently updated and offers a sophisticated range of search modalities.

Its special collections contain a well-preserved copy of the 1616 Emser Chronik (Ems Chronicle), a masterwork of the art of book printing, which has been called "the most beautiful book ever printed in Vorarlberg."

== Building ==
The "Babenwohl Castle" (originally belonging to the counts of Bregenz, and called "Babenboll"), dates from the second half of the 14th century. It was acquired by Baron Ernest von Pöllnitz from Würzburg on 11 February 1854. He had the small castle renovated and expanded, with a stair tower, by the master builder Gabriel Mallaun. In the years following the families Pöllnitz and Douglass lived on the premises. The Bludenz writer Grete Gulbransson, who frequently spent time at Babenwohl during her youth, wrote about life in this building in her novel "Beloved Shadows" ("Geliebte Schatten").

In 1907 a monastery was built on the premises, and later expanded. In the south wing materials from the former castle have been integrated into various renovations. In 1910/11 the library tract was added at a right angle, according to plans by the Swiss architect Adolf Gaudy (1872–1956).

Since 1985 the library has been located in the former Benedictine Monastery St. Gallus. In 1981 the monastery was taken over by the State of Vorarlberg, and since 1993 the former library of the St. Gallus Monastery – the so-called "Cupola Room", restored to its original state - has been used as part of the library.
