= August Hoffmann von Vestenhof =

Munich-based Austrian artist (1849–1922)

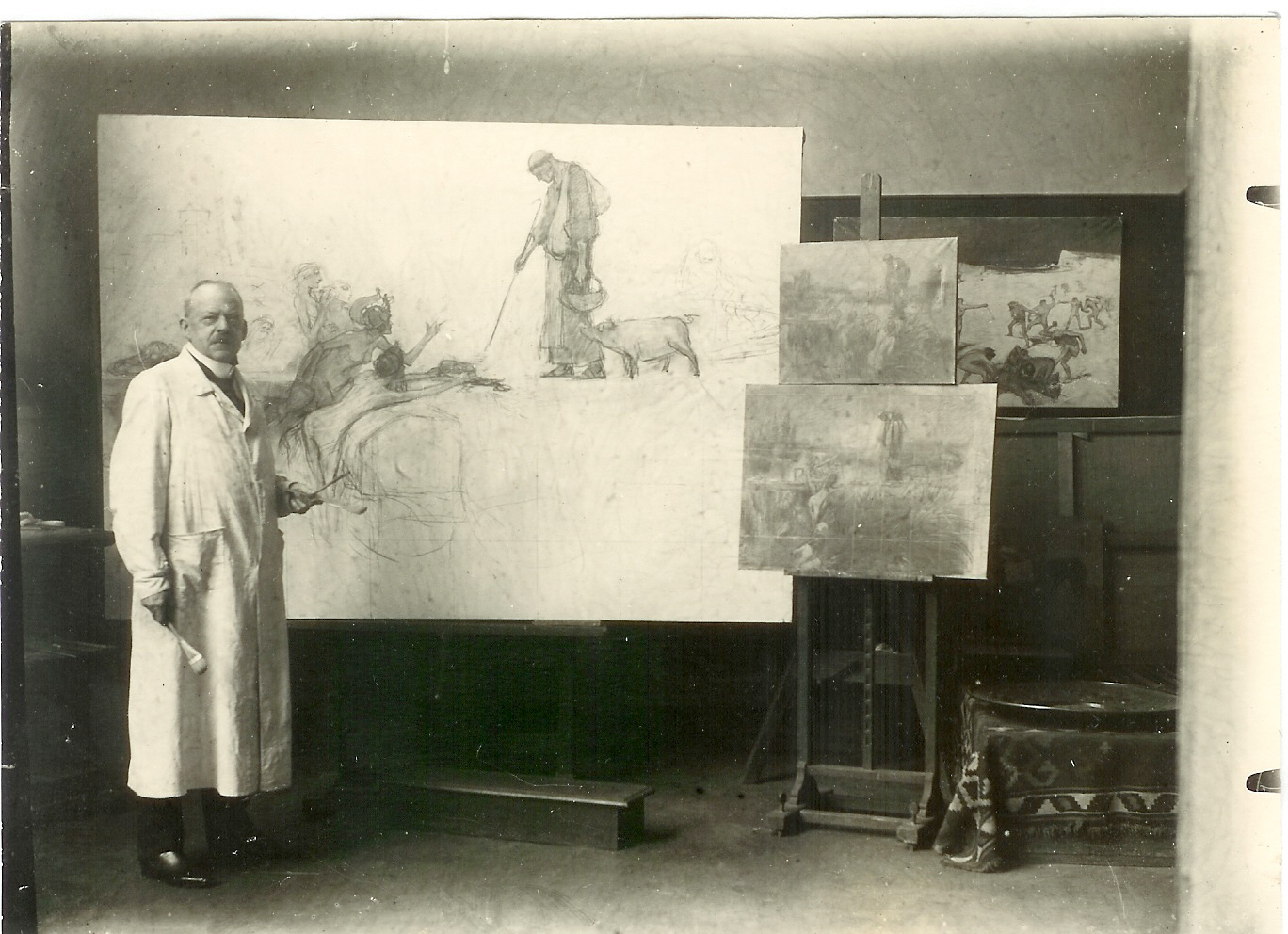
The artist in his studio (1908)

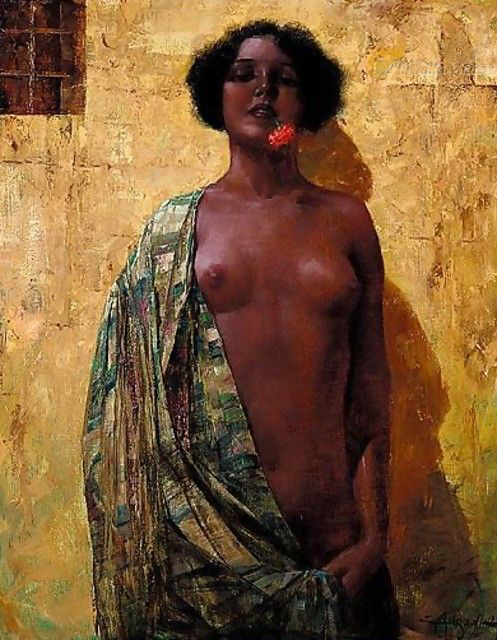
Nude with Rose (n.d.)

August Adolf Hoffmann Ritter von Vestenhof (1849–1922) was an Austrian painter, illustrator, sculptor and writer, based in Munich.

== Life ==
August Hoffmann von Vestenhof was born in Olmütz (modern-day Olomouc), Moravia on 18 June 1849.

He exhibited from 1896 in Munich, Berlin and elsewhere. He exhibited tempera paintings: Zwei Messias ('Two Messiahs'), Die Stunde ('The Hour'), Tragische Maske ('Tragic Mask'), Nausikaa ('Nausicaa'), Wagen des Heliogabal ('Chariot of Heliogabalus'), and sculpture: lead reliefs, bronze statuettes and portrait busts. He also provided drawings for his book Das Gesetz der Bestie ('The Law of the Beast') and illustrations for the magazine Jugend.

He died in Munich on 15 May 1922, aged 72.

== Collections ==
- Vienna (Österreichische Galerie Belvedere): Amor Janitor, n.d.
