= Karl Arnold (painter) =

German painter, caricaturist and comics maker

Karl Maximilian Arnold (1 April 1883 – 29 November 1953) was a German painter, caricaturist and comics maker. He was born in Neustadt near Coburg to Max Oscar Arnold and Emilie Dorn.

Along with Olaf Gulbransson, Thomas Theodor Heine and Bruno Paul, Karl Arnold was one of the most important cartoonists of the first half of the 20th century in Germany. He died in 1953 at the age of 70.
