= Josef Benedikt Engl =

German caricaturist and illustrator

Josef Benedikt Engl (1867 – 1907), also known as J.B. Engl, was a German caricaturist and illustrator. He was known for his work for the journal Simplicissimus, to which he contributed to all issues until his death.

== Engl's work ==
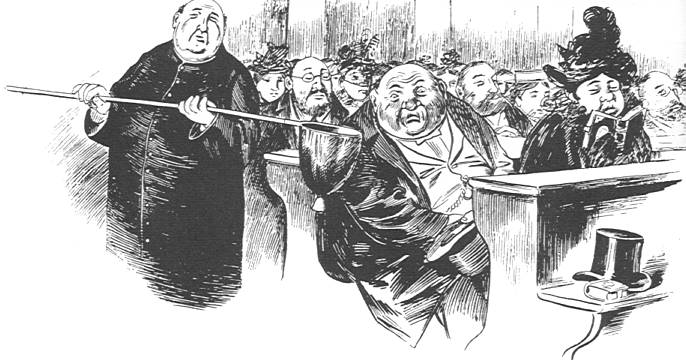
Der Zentrumsmann

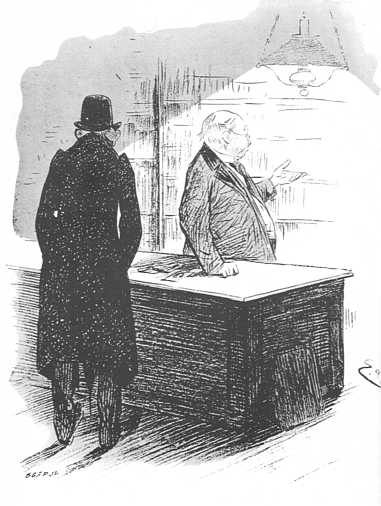
Aus der Praxis eines Heiligen

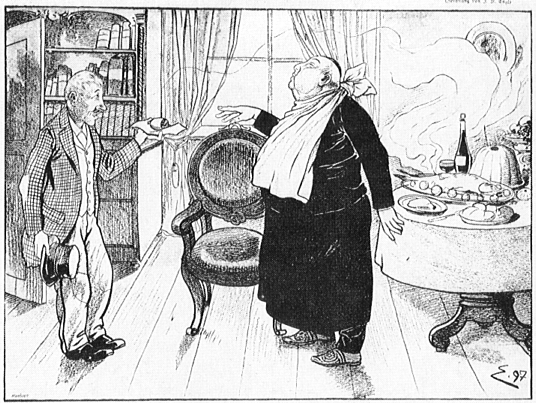
Abgewinkt

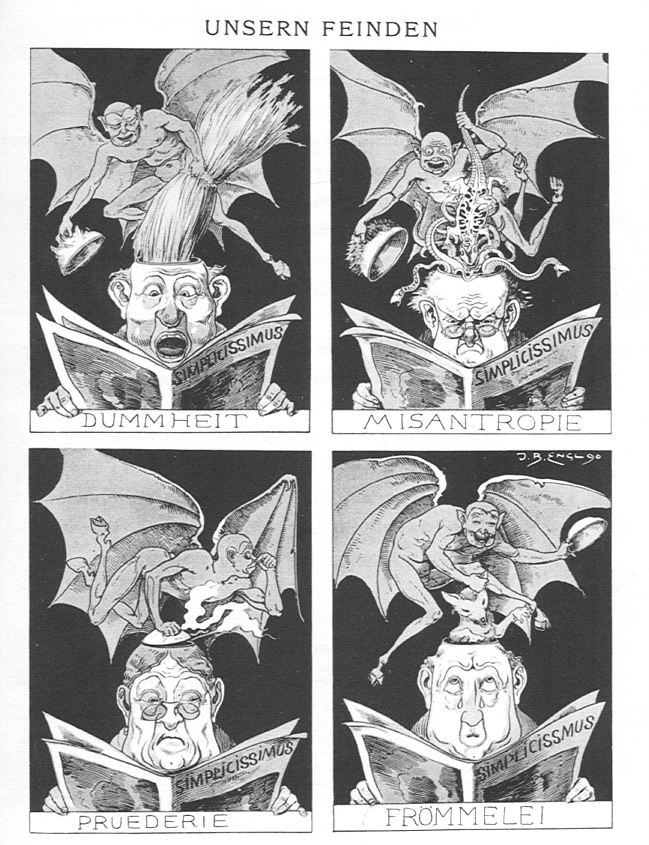
Unsern Feinden

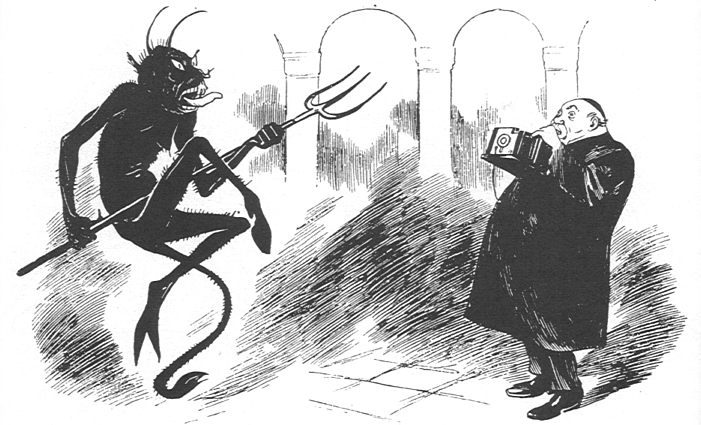
Ein guter Gedanke

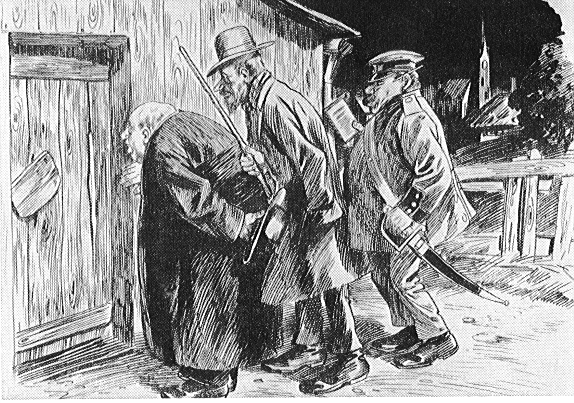
Der geheime Tanzboden

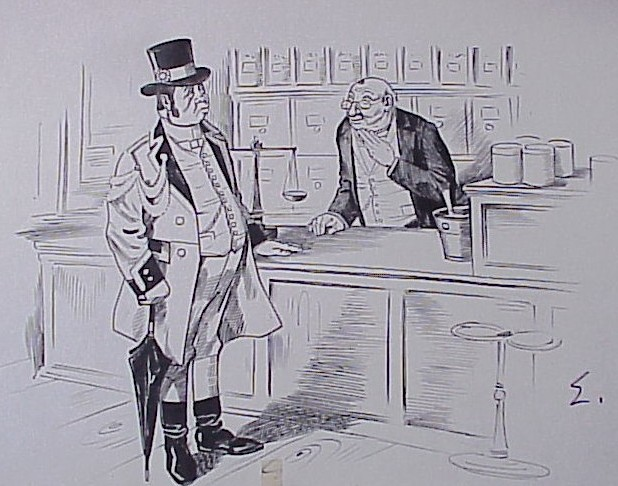
Der Landapotheker

== See also ==
- List of German painters
