= Münchner Neueste Nachrichten =

Former newspaper in Munich, Germany

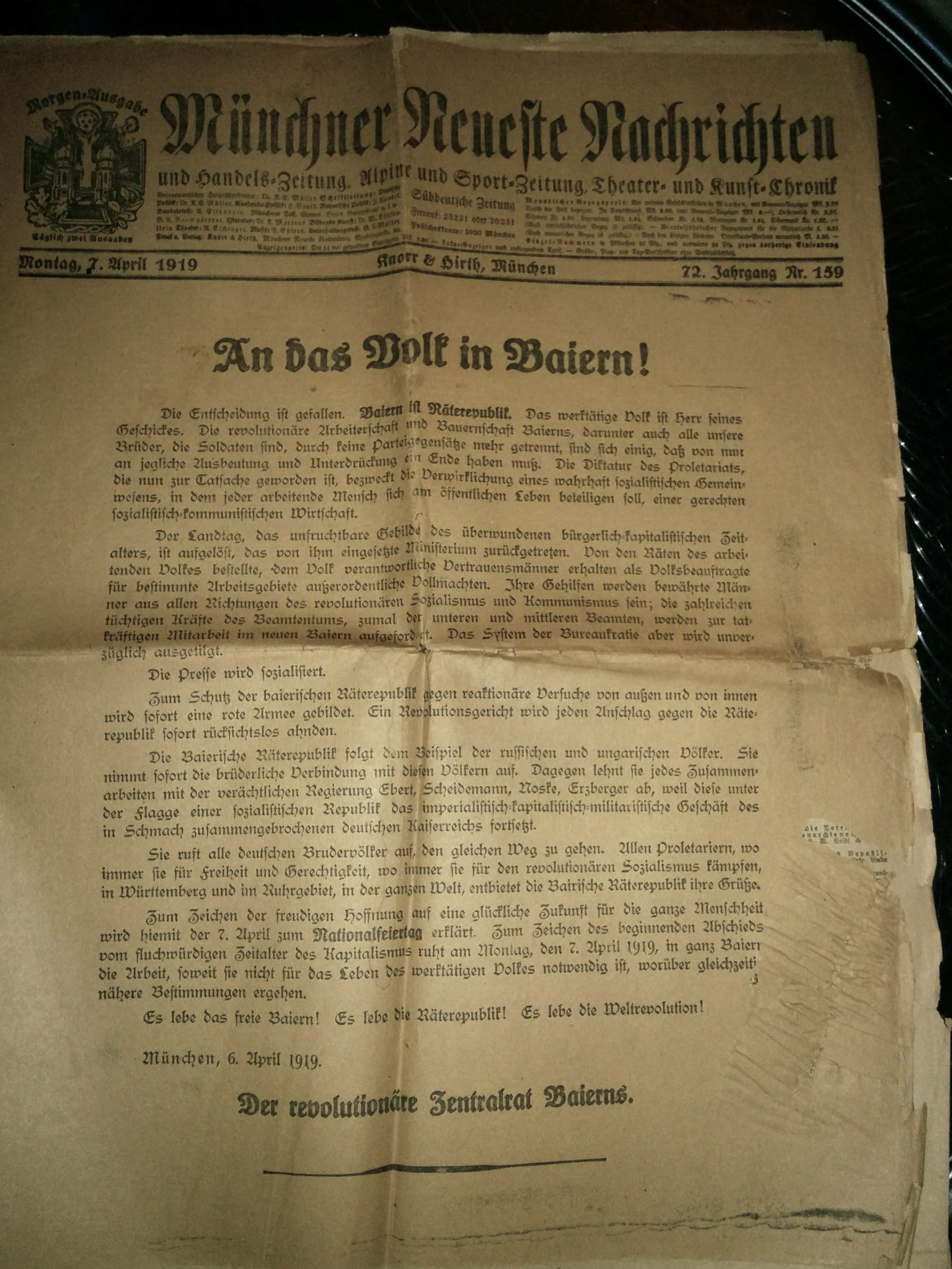
- Declaration of the Bavarian Soviet Republic, published in Münchner Neueste Nachrichten on 7 April 1919
- Type: daily newspaper
- Format: broadsheet
- Founded: 9 April 1848; 177 years ago
- Ceased publication: 28 April 1945; 80 years ago

Münchner Neueste Nachrichten (Munich's Latest News) was a German daily newspaper published in Munich between 1848 and 1945.

The paper was first published on 9 April 1848 as cheap way to inform the masses. After its purchase by Julius Knorr, the newspaper had a liberal and monarchist alignment and favored German unification. Georg Hirth wrote for the newspaper. The circulation rose from 7,000 in 1848 to 170,000 in 1918, making it the largest Bavarian newspaper in circulation. After the sale to a consortium consisting of the Gutehoffnungshütte AG, the Alfred Hugenberg publishing house and anonymous holding companies in 1920, the newspaper was re-aligned as a conservative and right-wing publication that favored the government of Gustav Ritter von Kahr and his successors.

Following Hitler's rise to power, the paper was taken over by the Nazi Party and aligned with its ideology. The newspaper ceased publication on 28 April 1945. The Süddeutsche Zeitung considers itself the successor of the liberal Münchner Neueste Nachrichten and has used the name for its local pages.
