= Øyvind Sørensen =

Norwegian illustrator (1887–1962)

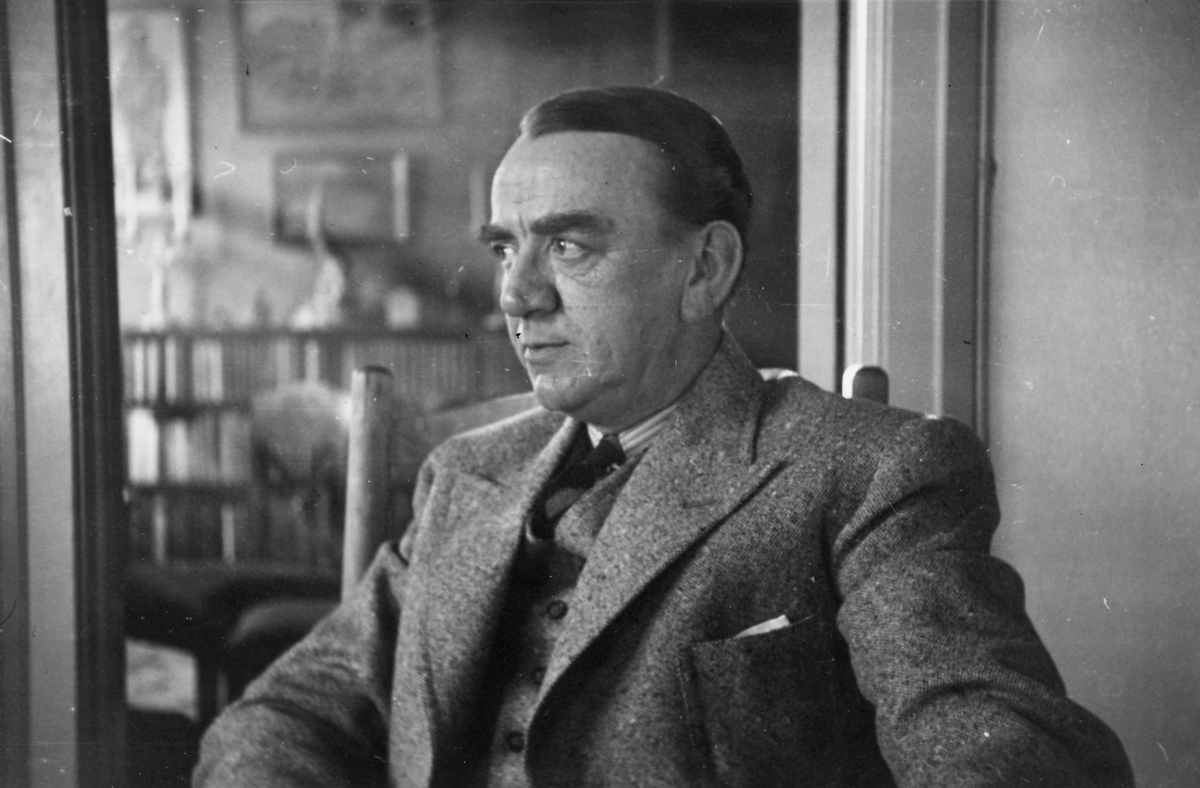
Øyvind Sørensen c. 1950

Øyvind Sørensen (29 April 1887 – 11 October 1962) was a Norwegian illustrator. He was born in Fredrikstad, Norway. Most of his career was spent as an illustrator for the newspaper Aftenposten, where he worked for over a period of fifty years. Also, there were records of him working for some satirical magazines. Many of his illustrations where represented on various museums and institutions, including the National Gallery of Norway, Oslo Bymuseum and Bergen Museum.

During various points in his life, Øyvind Sørensen trained under Johan Nordhagen, Bernard Naudin, Stanley Anderson and Rowland Hilder.

== Career at Aftenposten ==
Øyvind Sørensen's first stint at Aftenposten began in 1909. It lasted until 1914, when he left to work for other publications. He joined Aftenposten again in 1918, and worked there until 1957. Besides Aftenposten, his work also appeared in magazines, comic books and Christmas booklets. His work in the Christmas booklets, especially the portraits, were highly popular. One of his best works of illustration was in Henry Haugstøls's books on the old Christiania and Trangviksposten.

Sørensen held many solo exhibitions during his career. In 1964, the Artists' Association in Oslo organized a memorial exhibition in his honor. Sørensen was also commercially successful because his works were bought by several famous institutions. Among his clients were the National Museum of Fine Arts, Oslo City Museum, Bergen Museum and the University of Oslo.

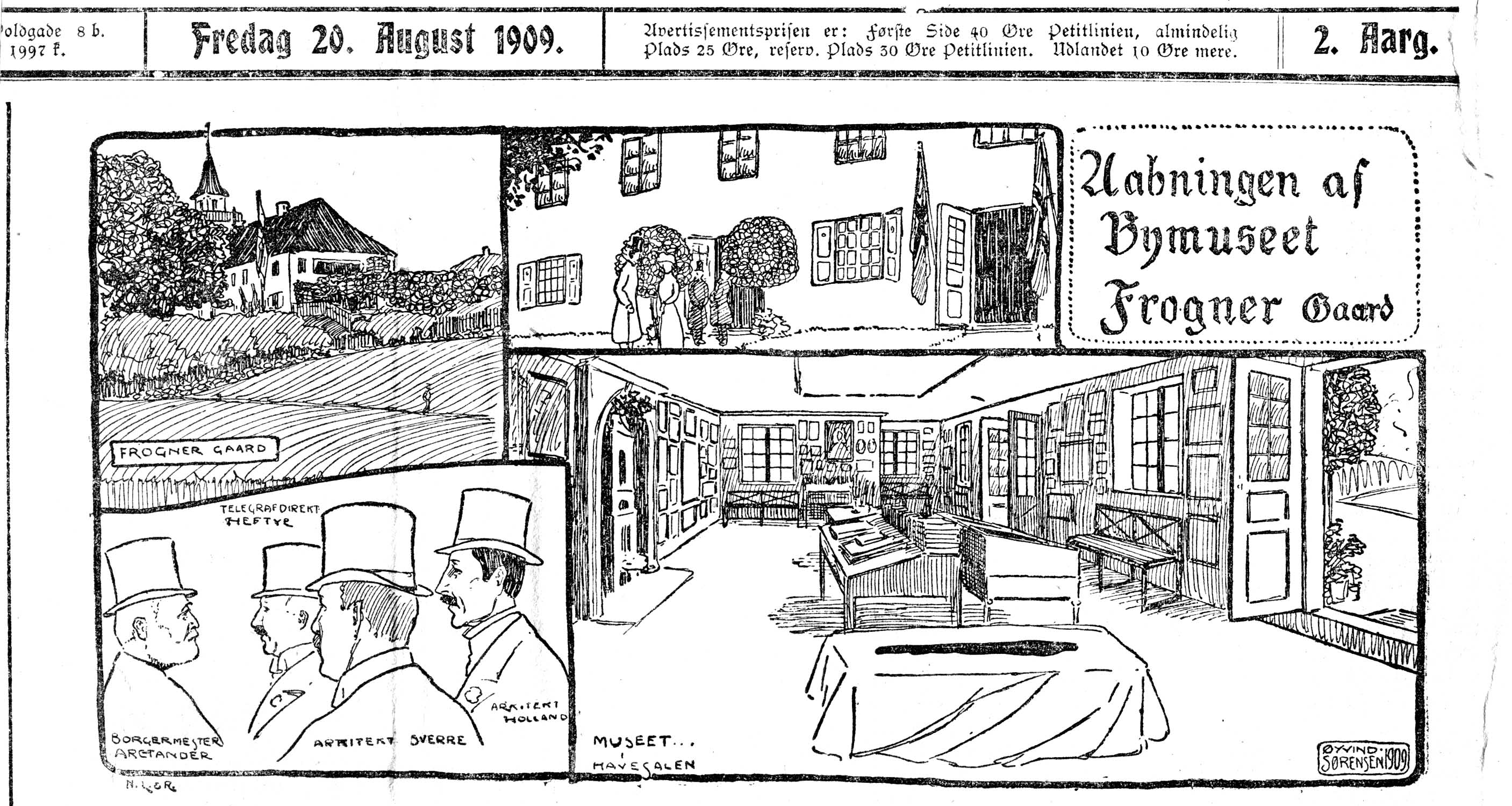
An illustration by Øyvind Sørensen entitled Opening of the City Museum of Christiania (Oslo) in 1909.
