= Trangviksposten =

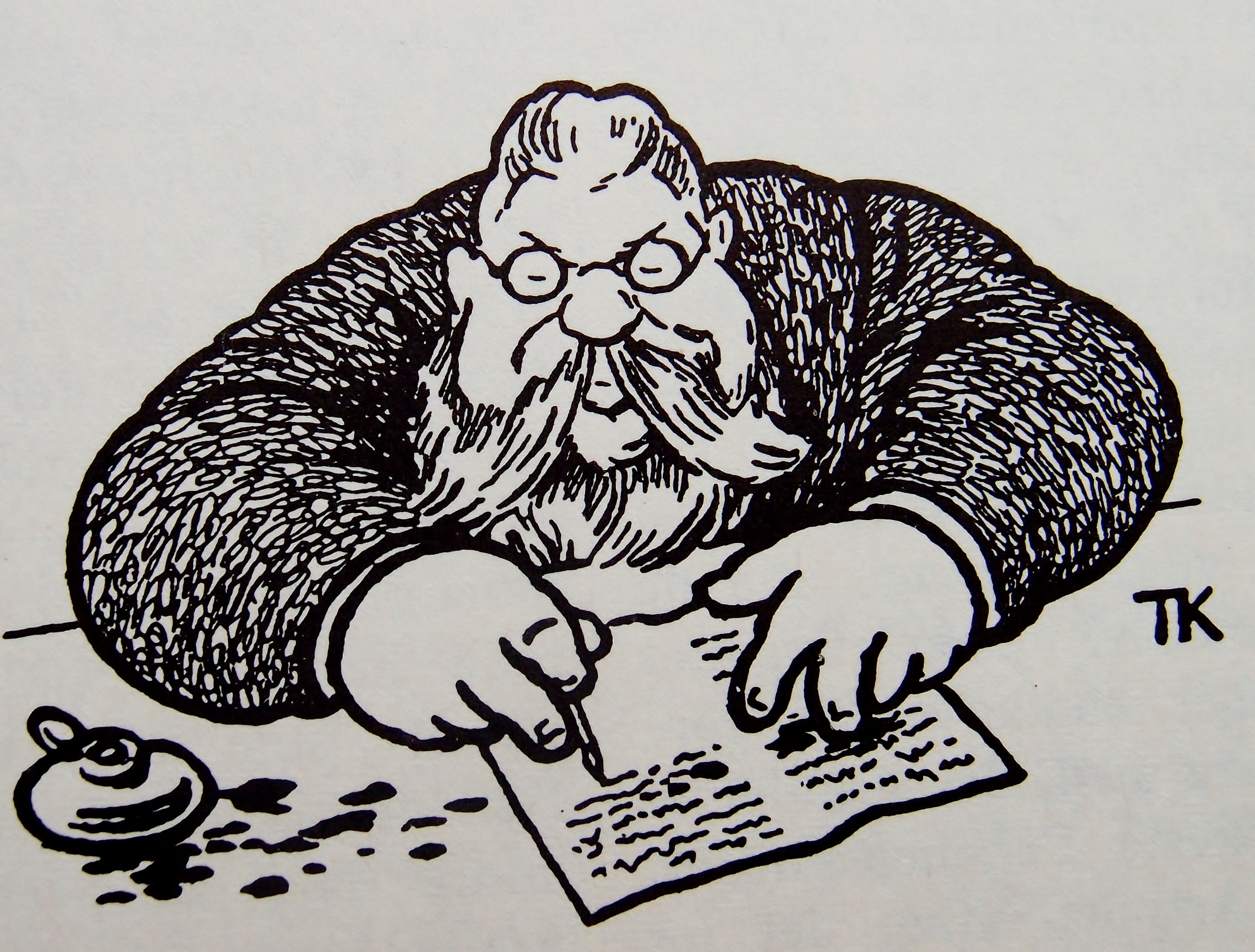

Trangviksposten is a satirical newspaper parody created by Jacob Hilditch. It first appeared as a feuilleton in the newspaper Aftenposten, a parody of a fictional local newspaper in a small town. Trangviksposten is a satire on Norwegian local newspapers and the social conditions in Norwegian small towns as they must have faded in the last decades of the 19th century. The fictitious "Trangvik" is apparently located, as you can read between the lines in Trangviksposten, somewhere on the coast between Horten and Kristiansand. Trangviksposten's editor "Syvertsen" leads a daily battle against his fiercest competitor, Trangvik Tidende. Among illustrators were Olaf Gulbransson, Theodor Kittelsen and Øyvind Sørensen. Trangviksposten was published in three book volumes between 1900 and 1907. A selection was published by Den norske Bokklubben in 1980, edited by Mentz Schulerud.

The 1927 film Den glade enke i Trangvik was based upon Hilditsch's stories and characters.
