= Grete Gulbransson =

Austrian writer and poet (1882–1934)

- Born: Margarethe Jehly; 31 July 1882; Thüringen, Austria
- Died: 26 March 1934 (aged 51); Zwischenwasser, Austria
- Occupation: Writer
- Spouse: Olav Gulbransson (1873–1958)
- Writing career
- Language: German
- Notable work: Geliebte Schatten

Grete Gulbransson (born Jehly, 31 July 1882 – 26 March 1934) was an Austrian writer and poet, best known for her 1934 family chronicle Geliebte Schatten, which became a best-seller.

== Life ==
Greta Jehly was born in Bludenz, Vorarlberg, the daughter of the painter Jakob Jehly and Wanda von Pöllnitz. She was a half-sister of the writer Norman Douglas and her maternal great-grandfather was General James Ochoncar Forbes (1765–1843), 17th Lord Forbes. At the age of nineteen, after the death of her parents, she settled in Munich, where she came into contact with the intellectual and artistic milieu around the satirical magazine Simplicissimus. There she met and married the Norwegian painter and cartoonist Olaf Gulbransson in 1906. She documented in her diaries their life in the bohemian quarter Schwabing. They had a son, Olaf Andreas Gulbransson, who became a noted church architect.

The Gulbranssons divorced in 1923. Due to financial difficulties Greta moved back to Vorarlberg at the end of the 1920s. From 1930 to 1934 she lived at Schloss Weißenberg in Batschuns.

== Select works (prose, poetry, drama) ==
- Geliebte Schatten. Eine Chronik der Heimat. Grote, Berlin 1934. (Re-printed by Bregenz, H. Lingenhöle u. Co 1995. ISBN 3-85162-016-X)
- Gedichte. Fischer, Berlin 1914
- Ewiger Ruf. Musarion, München 1922
- Batlogg. Montafoner Heimatstück in 6 Bildern. Schruns 1932
- Ehreguta. Ballade. F. Dworzak, Bludenz 1932
