= Gulbranson =

Gulbranson is a surname. Notable people with the surname include:

- Carl August Gulbranson (1831–1910), Norwegian businessman and politician
- Ellen Gulbranson (1863–1947), Swedish operatic soprano
- Hans Gulbranson (1787–1868), Norwegian business

== See also ==
- Gulbrandsen
- Gulbransen
