= Olaf Gulbransson =

Norwegian artist, painter and designer

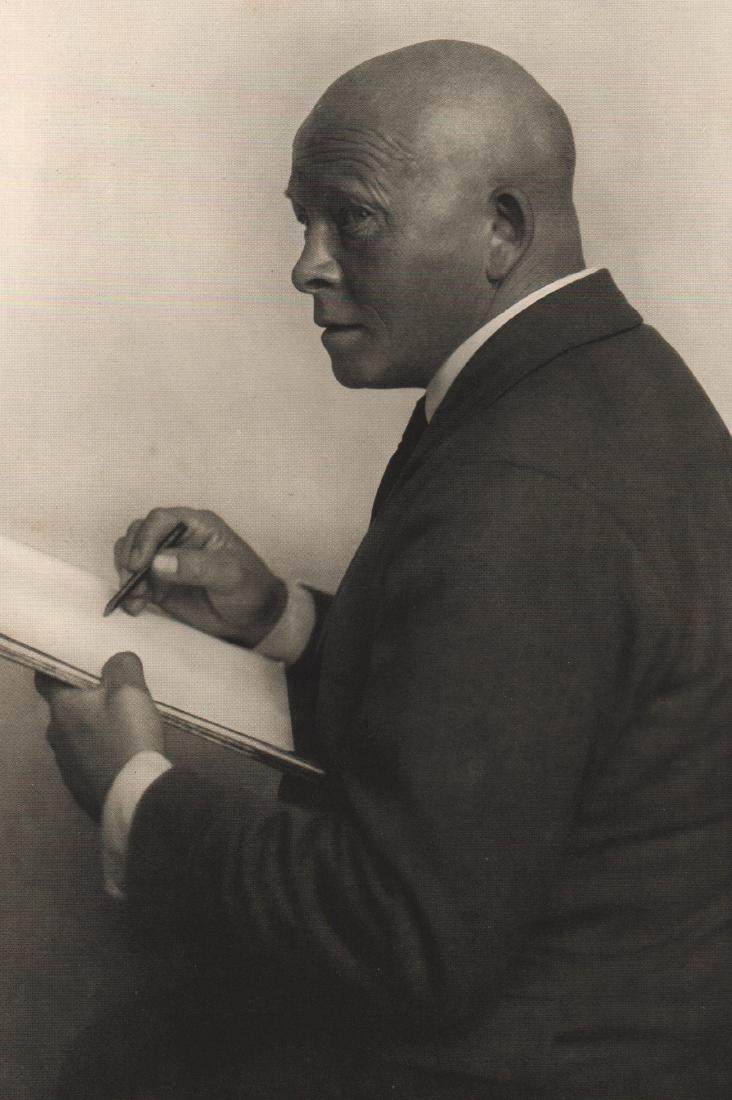
- Gulbransson in 1929
- Born: Olaf Leonhard Gulbransson; 26 May 1873; Oslo, Norway
- Died: 18 September 1958 (aged 85); Tegernsee, West Germany

Olaf Leonhard Gulbransson (26 May 1873 – 18 September 1958) was a Norwegian artist, painter and designer. He is probably best known for his caricatures and illustrations.

== Biography ==
From 1885 until 1893, he trained at the Norwegian National Academy of Craft and Art Industry in Christiania (now Oslo), Norway. From 1890, he worked for many Norwegian magazines, including Tyrihans, Pluk, Paletten, Fluesoppen, Sfinx and Trangviksposten (1899–1901). In 1900, he studied at the Académie Colarossi in Paris. In 1902, he moved to Germany to work for the satirical magazine Simplicissimus in Munich after editor Albert Langen had been in contact with author Bjørnstjerne Bjørnson looking for Norwegian talent. With publicity increasing Gulbransson's fame, and even though he lived in Germany between 1923 and 1927, he drew for Tidens tegn in Oslo.

Caricature by Olaf Gulbransson 1909: "Manoeuvre: Emperor William II explains the enemy's positions to Prince Ludwig of Bavaria"

In 1929 he became professor at the Academy of Fine Arts, Munich. In 1933 the art academy in Berlin arranged a special exhibition to celebrate Gulbransson's 60th birthday, which was shut down by the Nazi party after only two days.

Simplicissimus editors Franz Schoenberner and Thomas Theodor Heine have claimed that Gulbransson actively cooperated with the Nazis from 1933 on, and this co-operation was sharply criticized by the writer Klaus Mann. During World War II, after his own home country was occupied by the Germans, he produced caricatures against the Allies, in particular against Winston Churchill. In 1941, he was made an honorary member of the Society of Berlin Artists and in 1942 of the Academy of Fine Arts Vienna. On the occasion of his 70th birthday in 1943 he was awarded the Goethe Medal for Art and Science and was made Emeritus Professor of the Academy of Fine Arts, Munich.

Gulbransson illustrated many books, including the children's books Det var engang (Once upon a time), which was published simultaneously in Norway and Germany in 1934, and Und so weiter (And so on) which was published in Germany in 1954.

Gulbransson was married three times. His 1906 marriage to Grete Jehly produced a son, Olaf Andreas Gulbransson, who became a noted church architect. His third marriage was with Bjørnstjerne Bjørnson's niece, Dagny Bjørnson.

Gulbransson also gave his name to the Olaf Gulbransson Prize, won by cartoonists such as Volker Kriegel and Michael Sowa. In 2004 the artists Lars Fiske and Steffen Kverneland published the book Olaf G., a retrospective comic book about Olaf Gulbransson.

== Related reading ==
- Simplicissimus:Eine Auswahl der Jahrgänge 1896–1914. Richard Christ, Rütten & Loening (GDR) 1978 (in German)
