= Georg Hirth =

German writer, journalist and publisher

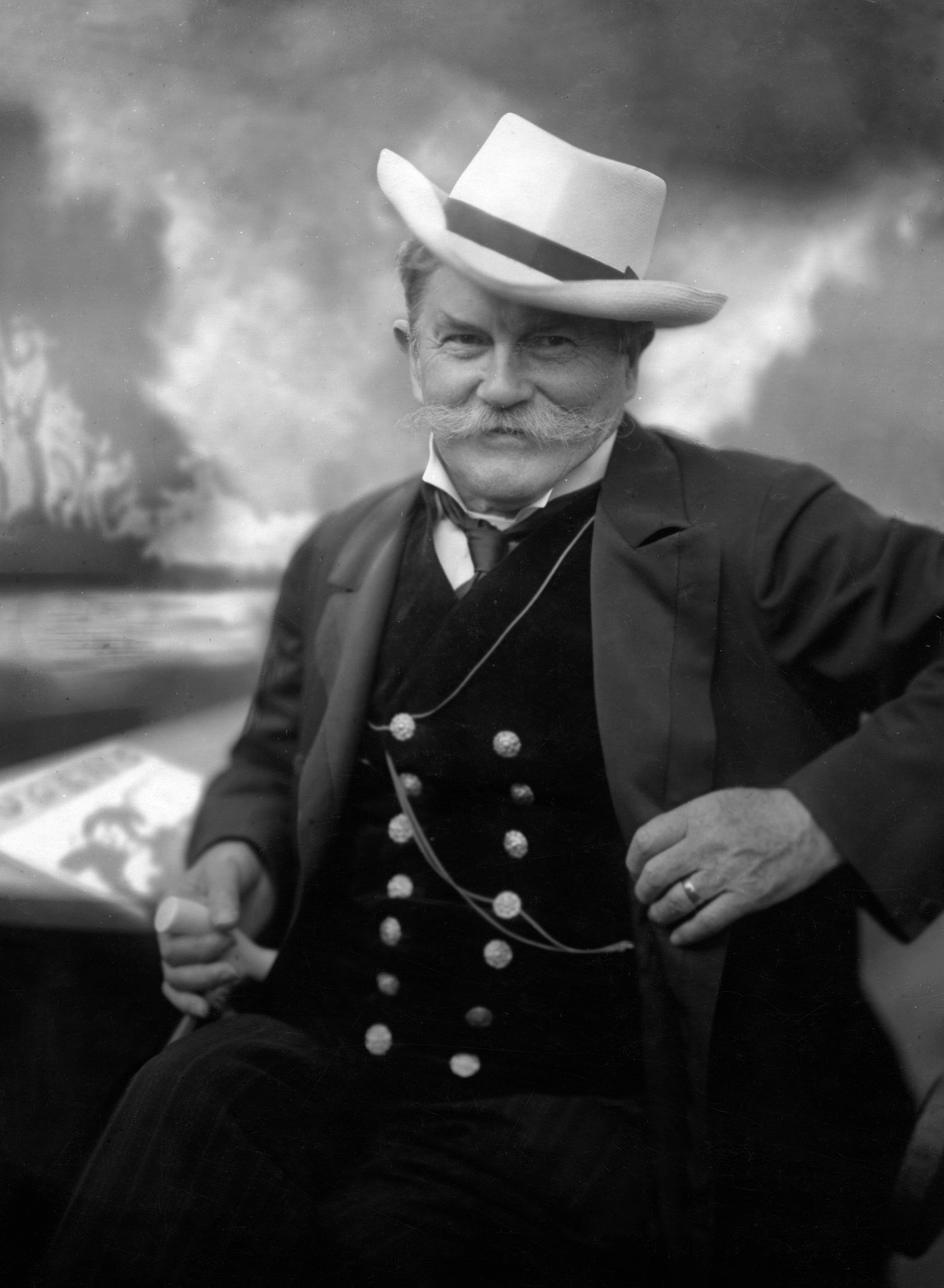
Georg Hirth by Nicola Perscheid

Cover page of an 1896 edition of Jugend magazine. The magazine, founded and edited by Hirth, was important for helping popularize Art Nouveau and for lending its name to the German term for the style, Jugendstil.

Georg Hirth (13 July 1841 in Tonna – 28 March 1916 in Tegernsee) was a German writer, journalist and publisher. He is best known for founding the cultural magazine Jugend in 1896, which was instrumental in popularizing Art Nouveau.

== Biography ==
Hirth was born in Tonna, present-day Thuringia in 1841, studied to be an economist in Gotha and in Leipzig, and after a career working as a journalist at Münchner Neueste Nachrichten he founded the magazine Jugend: Münchner illustrierte Wochenschrift für Kunst und Leben (Youth: the illustrated weekly magazine of art and lifestyle of Munich). This publication, which reflected the modernist ideals that were circulating at the time among artists, was instrumental in promoting the style of Art Nouveau in Germany. As a result, the magazine's name was adopted as the most common German-language term for the movement: Jugendstil ("Jugend-style"). Hirth also coined the term "Secession" to represent the spirit of the various modern and reactionary movements of the era. He died in Tegernsee in 1916.

== Selected works ==
- Herausgeber: Tagebuch des deutsch-französischen Kriegs (Leipzig 1870–1874) – Diary of the Franco-Prussian War
- Der Formenschatz der Renaissance (1877 ff., seit 1879 unter dem Titel Der Formenschatz) – published in English as Art Treasure
- Das deutsche Zimmer der Gotik und Renaissance etc. (3. Auflage 1886) – The German Gothic and Renaissance Room
- Kulturgeschichtliches Bilderbuch aus drei Jahrhunderten (1883 ff.) – published in English as Picture book of the graphic arts, 1500–1800
- Published a series of facsimile-reproductions of German woodcut prints and drawings by Albrecht Dürer, Hans Holbein the younger, Lucas Cranach the Elder, Jost Amman, Virgil Solis and others in the Liebhaber-Bibliothek alter Illustratoren (1880 ff.)

== Bibliography ==
- Neue Deutsche Biographie, vol. 9, pp. 239–241, and vol. 12, p. 217
