= Olaf Andreas Gulbransson =

German architect

Olaf Andreas Gulbransson (23 January 1916, in Munich – 18 July 1961) was a German architect of Norwegian descent, particularly active in church architecture. He was the son of the Norwegian-born artist and painter Olaf Gulbransson (1873–1958) and his third wife Grete Jehly (1882–1934) – his mother was half-sister to the writer Norman Douglas.

He designed a conference hall for the Evangelische Akademie Tutzing.

== Bibliography ==
- Peter Poscharsky: Kirchen von Olaf Andreas Gulbransson. München 1966.
- Robert Stalla (ed.): Olaf Andreas Gulbransson (1916–1961). Kirchenbauten in Bayern. Deutscher Kunstverlag, München / Berlin 2007, ISBN 978-3-422-03096-1.
