= Simplicissimus =

Satirical German magazine

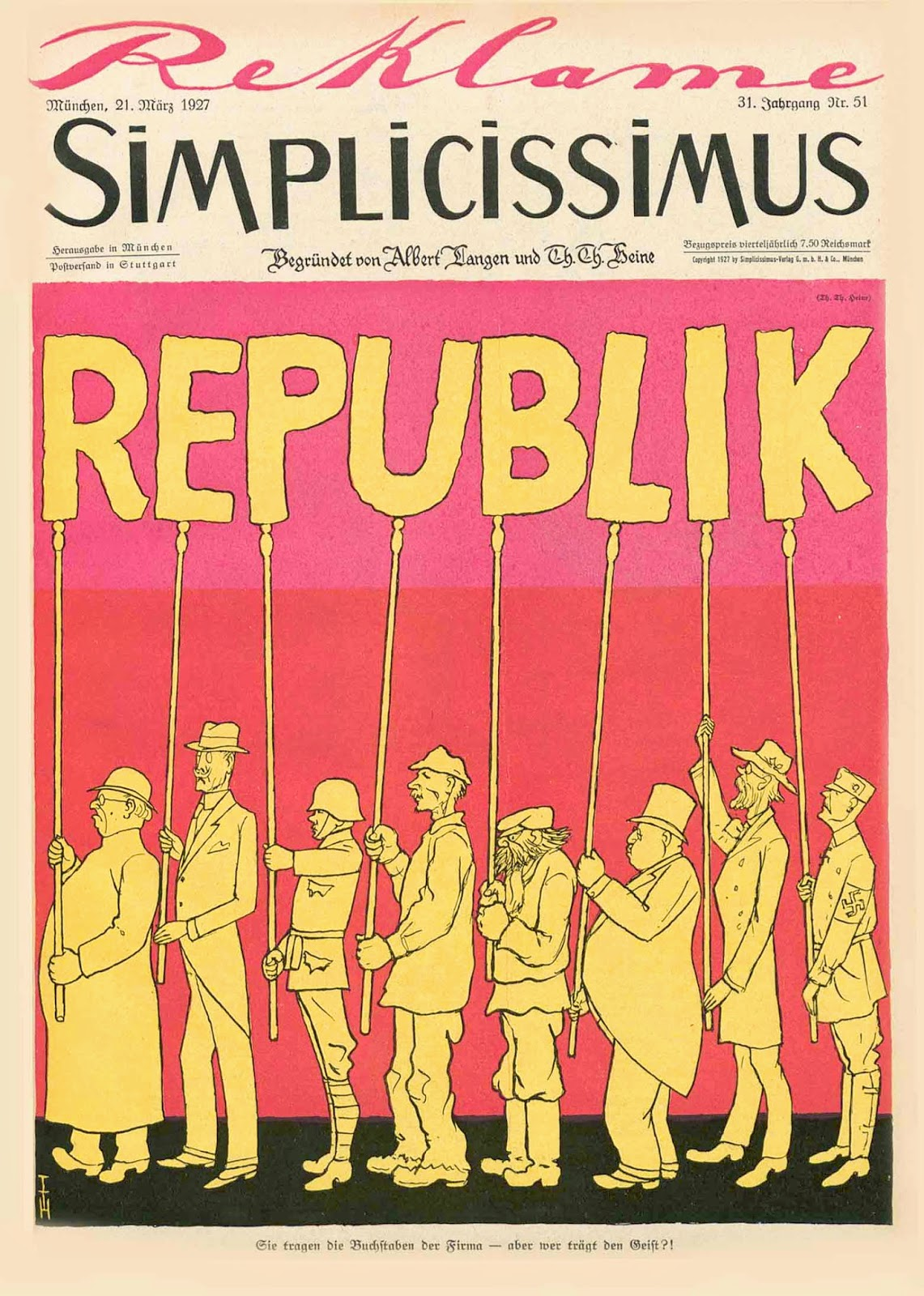
- They carry the letters of the company — but who carries the spirit of it? Simplicissimus published this cartoon of the Weimar Republic as a 'republic without republicans' on 21 March 1927
- Categories: Satirical arts, culture and politics
- Frequency: weekly; from 1964 a biweekly
- Total circulation: 85,000
- Founder: Albert Langen
- First issue: 1896
- Final issue: 1967
- Country: Germany
- Based in: Munich
- Language: German

Simplicissimus (German: [zɪmplɪˈtsɪsɪmʊs]) was a German weekly satirical magazine, founded by Albert Langen in April 1896 and headquartered in Munich. It was interrupted by a hiatus from 1944–1954, became a biweekly in 1964, and ceased publication in 1967. Simplicissimus took its name from the protagonist of Hans Jakob Christoffel von Grimmelshausen's 1668 novel Der Abenteuerliche Simplicissimus Teutsch, which is regarded as the first adventure novel in the German language and the first German novel masterpiece.

Combining brash and politically daring content with a bright, immediate, and surprisingly modern graphic style, Simplicissimus published the work of writers such as Thomas Mann and Rainer Maria Rilke. Its most reliable targets for caricature were stiff Prussian military figures and rigid German social and class distinctions, as seen from the more relaxed, liberal atmosphere of Munich. Contributors included Hermann Hesse, Gustav Meyrink, Fanny zu Reventlow, Jakob Wassermann, Frank Wedekind, Heinrich Kley, Alfred Kubin, Otto Nückel, Robert Walser, Heinrich Zille, Hugo von Hofmannsthal, Heinrich Mann, Lessie Sachs, and Erich Kästner.

Although the magazine's satirical nature was largely indulged by the German government, an 1898 cover mocking Kaiser Wilhelm's pilgrimage to Ottoman Palestine resulted in the issue being confiscated. Langen, the publisher, spent five years' exile in Switzerland and was fined 30,000 German gold marks. A six-month prison sentence was given to the cartoonist Thomas Theodor Heine and seven months to the writer Frank Wedekind. All the defendants were charged with "insulting a royal majesty." Again, in 1906, the editor Ludwig Thoma was imprisoned for six months for attacking the clergy. These controversies only served to increase circulation, which peaked at about 85,000 copies. Upon Germany's entry into World War I, the weekly dulled its satirical tone, began supporting the war effort, and considered closing down. Thereafter, the strongest political satire expressed in graphics became the province of artists George Grosz and Käthe Kollwitz (who were both contributors) and John Heartfield.

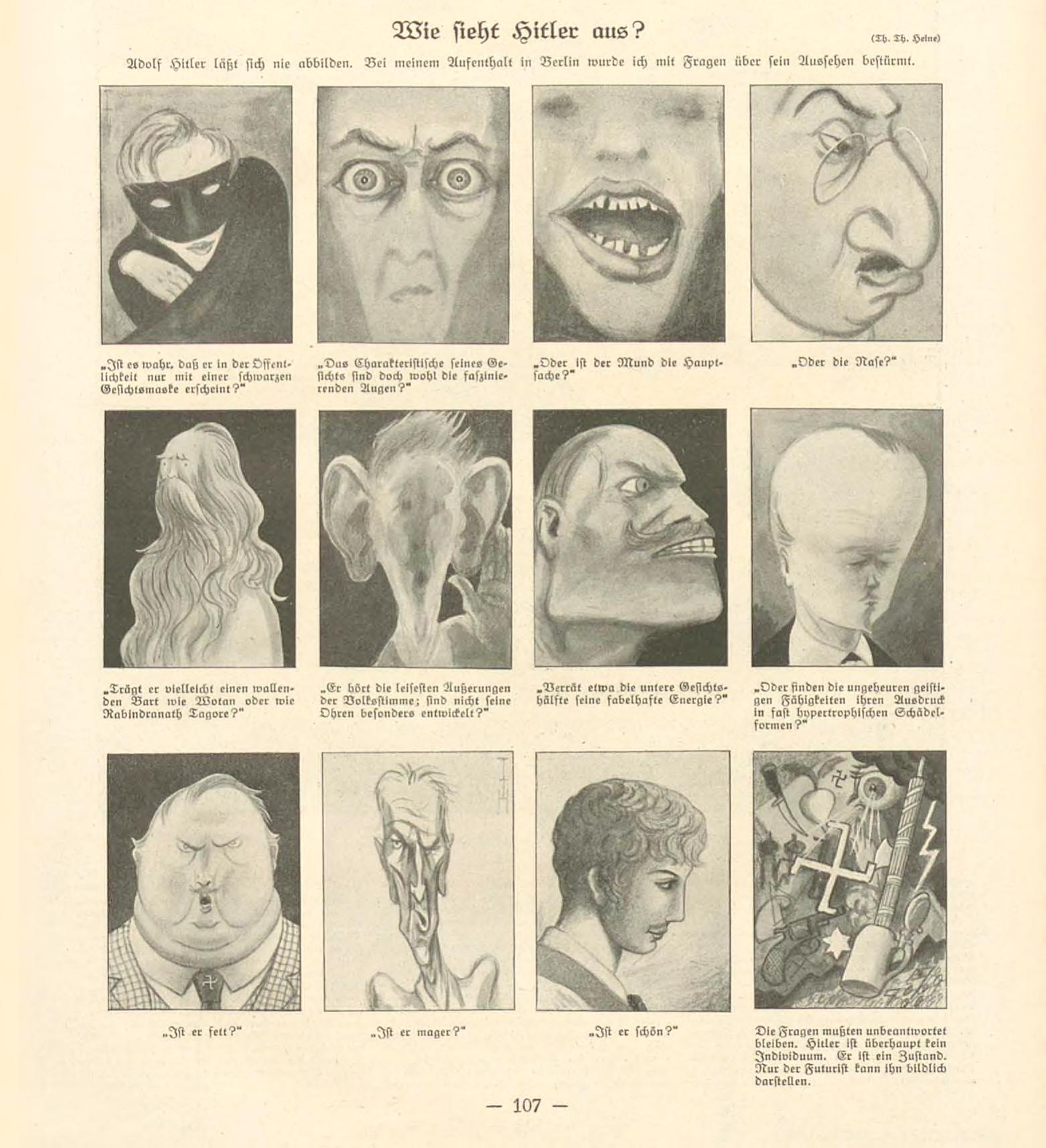
What Does Hitler Look Like? by cartoonist Thomas Theodor Heine. A satirical gallery from the 28 May 1923 105-116 issue of Simplicissimus magazine early in Hitler's Munich political career, when there were no publicly available photographs

The editor Ludwig Thoma joined the army in a medical unit in 1917, and lost his taste for satire, denouncing his previous work at the magazine, calling it immature and deplorable.

Black-and-white images
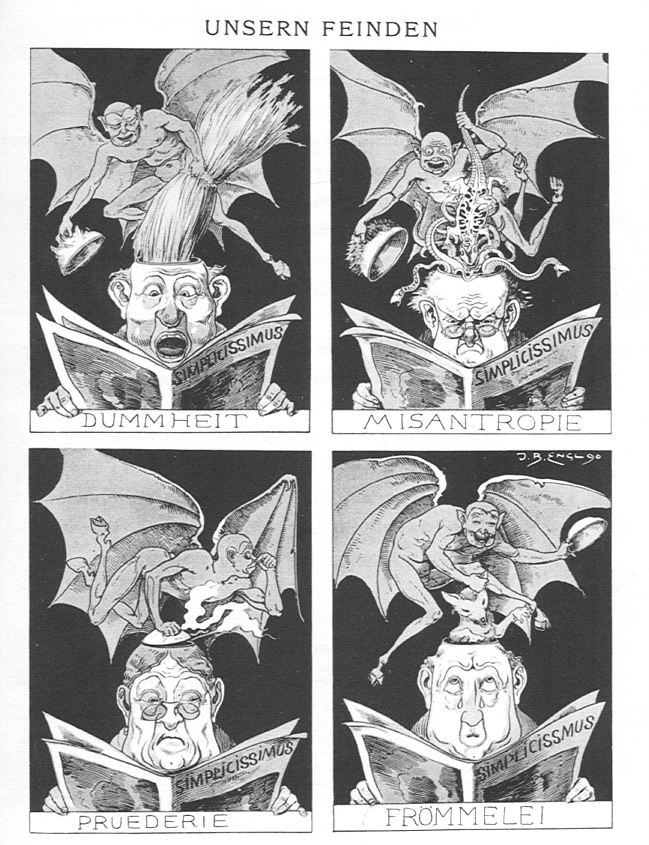
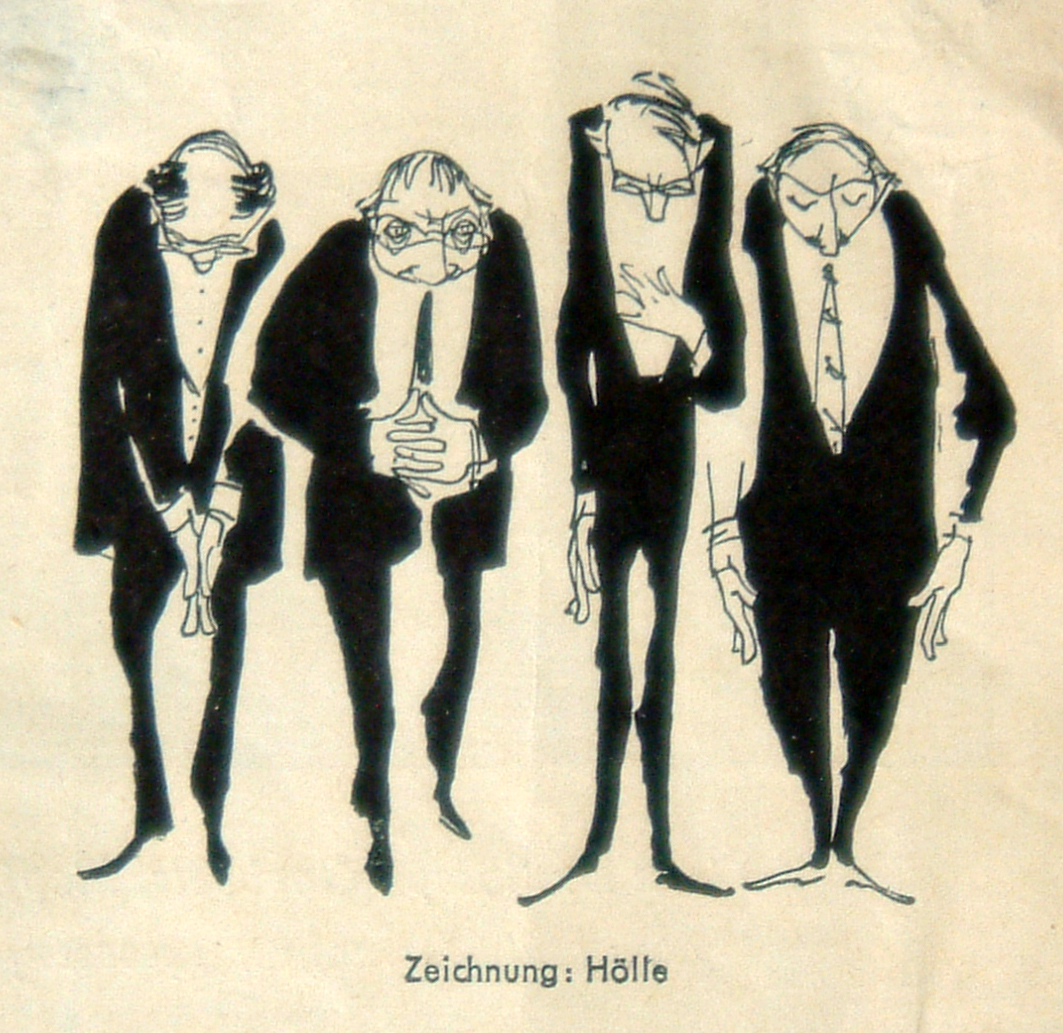
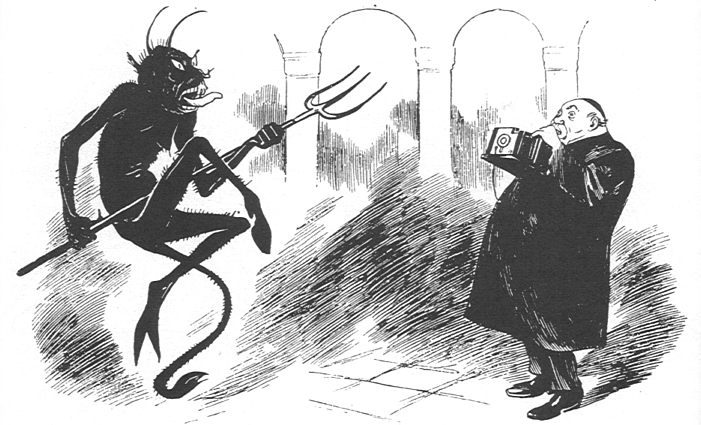

During the Weimar era, the magazine continued to publish and took a strong stand against extremists on the left and on the right. (A satirical gallery of cartoons posing the question "What Does Hitler Look Like?" was published on the second page of its 5-28-1923 issue, as there were then no publicly available photographs of Adolf Hitler.) As the National Socialists gradually came to power, they issued verbal accusations, attacks, threats, and personal intimidation against the artists and writers of Simplicissimus, but they did not ban it. The editor, Thomas Theodor Heine, a Jew, was forced to resign and went into exile. Other members of the team, including Karl Arnold, Olaf Gulbransson, Edward Thöny, Erich Schilling, and Wilhelm Schulz, remained and toed the Nazi party line, for which they were rewarded by the Nazis. The magazine adopted an aggressive satirical approach towards the Jews during this period, in line with the Nazi magazine Die Brennessel. Simplicissimus continued publishing, in declining form, until finally ceasing publication in 1944. It was revived from 1954–1967.

Other graphic artists associated with the magazine included Bruno Paul, Josef Benedikt Engl, Rudolf Wilke, Ferdinand von Reznicek, Joseph Sattler, and Jeanne Mammen.

== Gallery ==
A selection of Simplicissimus art

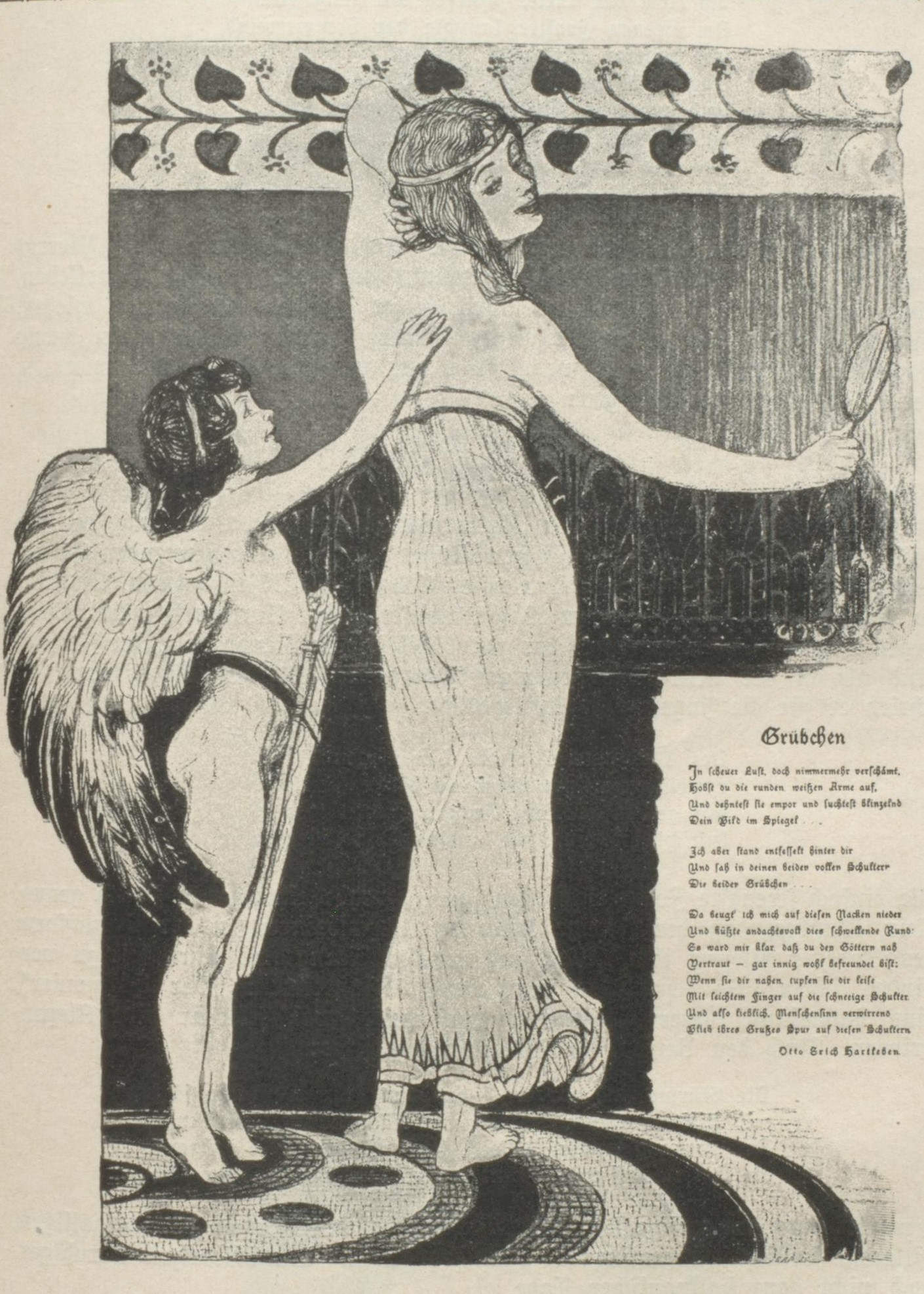
Illustration from 1896

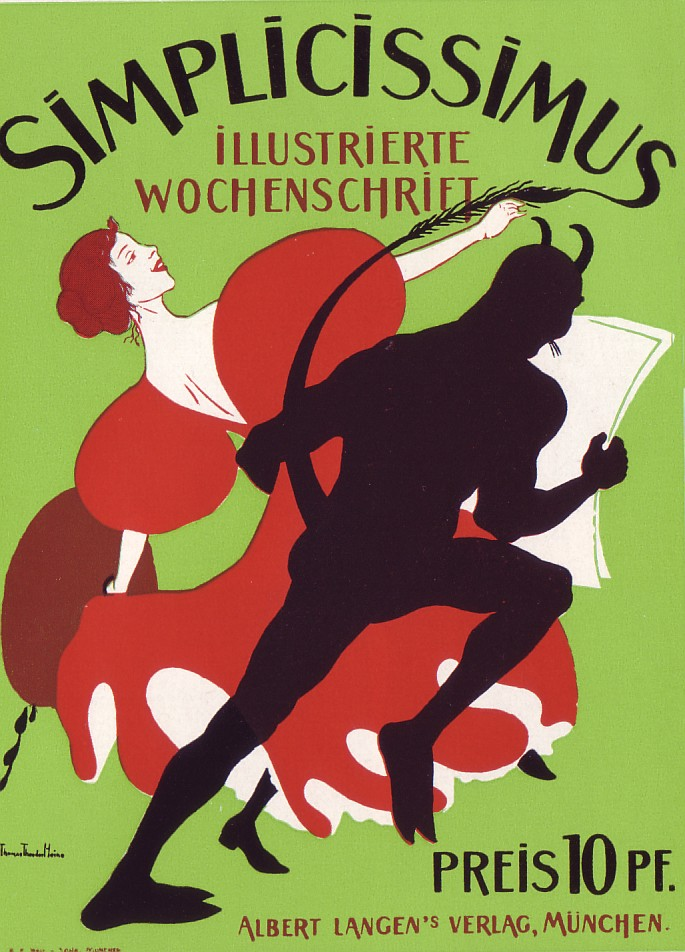
Cover from 1896. Art by Thomas Theodor Heine.

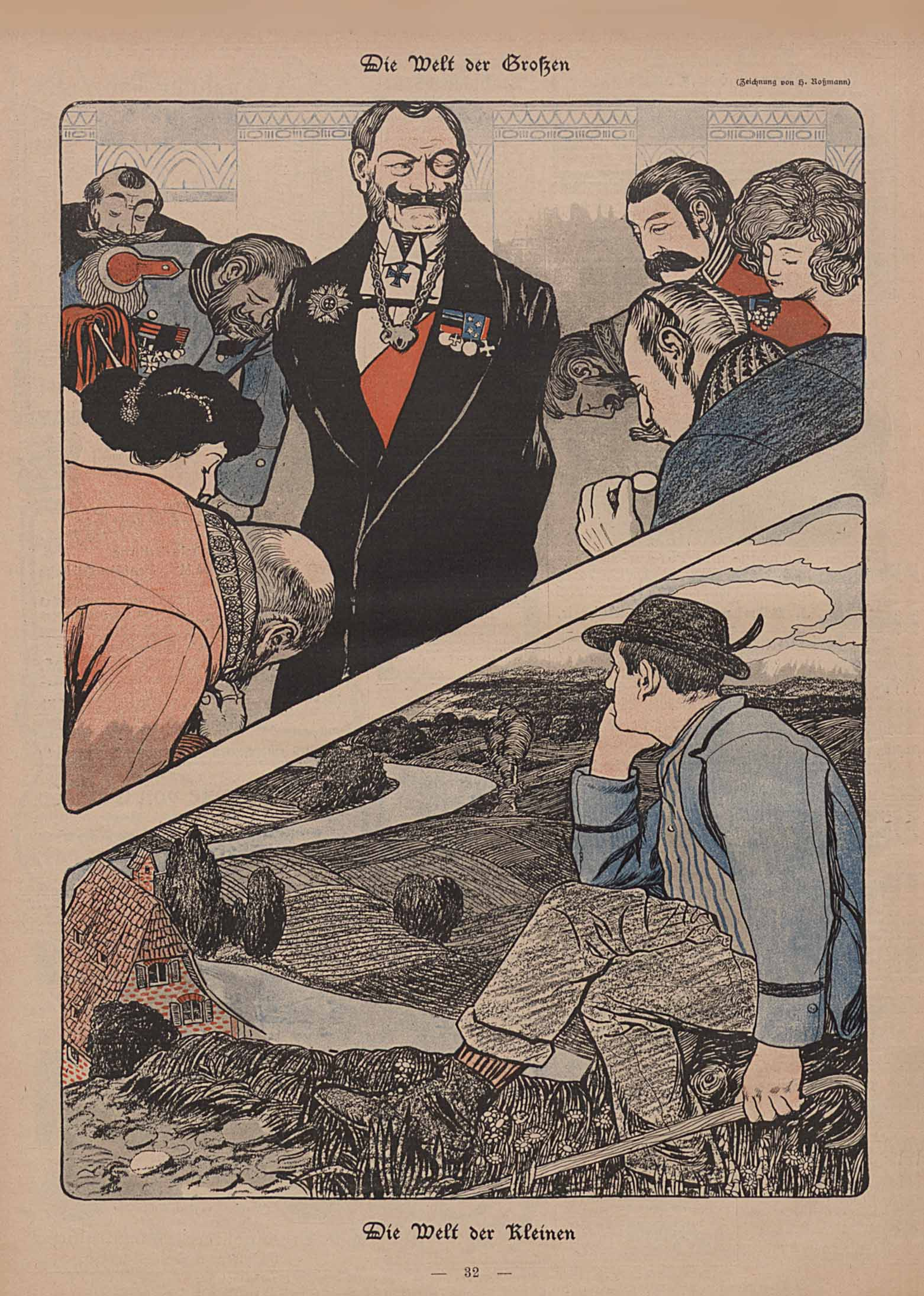
Cartoon from 1898. Art by Hans Rossmann.

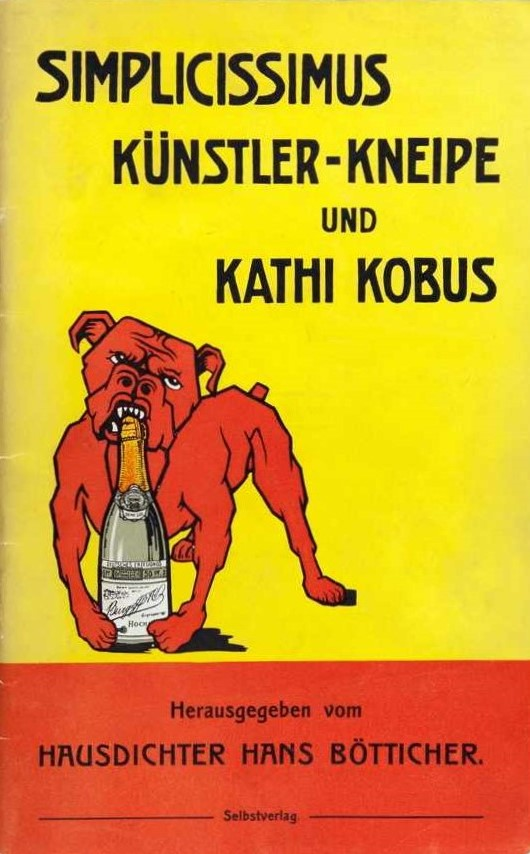
Simplicissimus Künstler-Kneipe und Kathi Kobus. Herausgegeben vom Hausdichter Hans Bötticher, cover from 1909, with the magazine's iconic bulldog designed by Thomas Theodor Heine

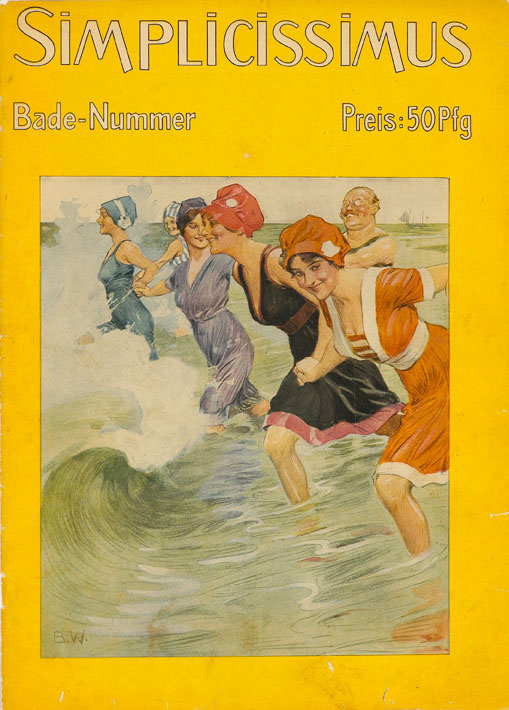
Cover from 1913. Art by Brynolf Wennerberg.

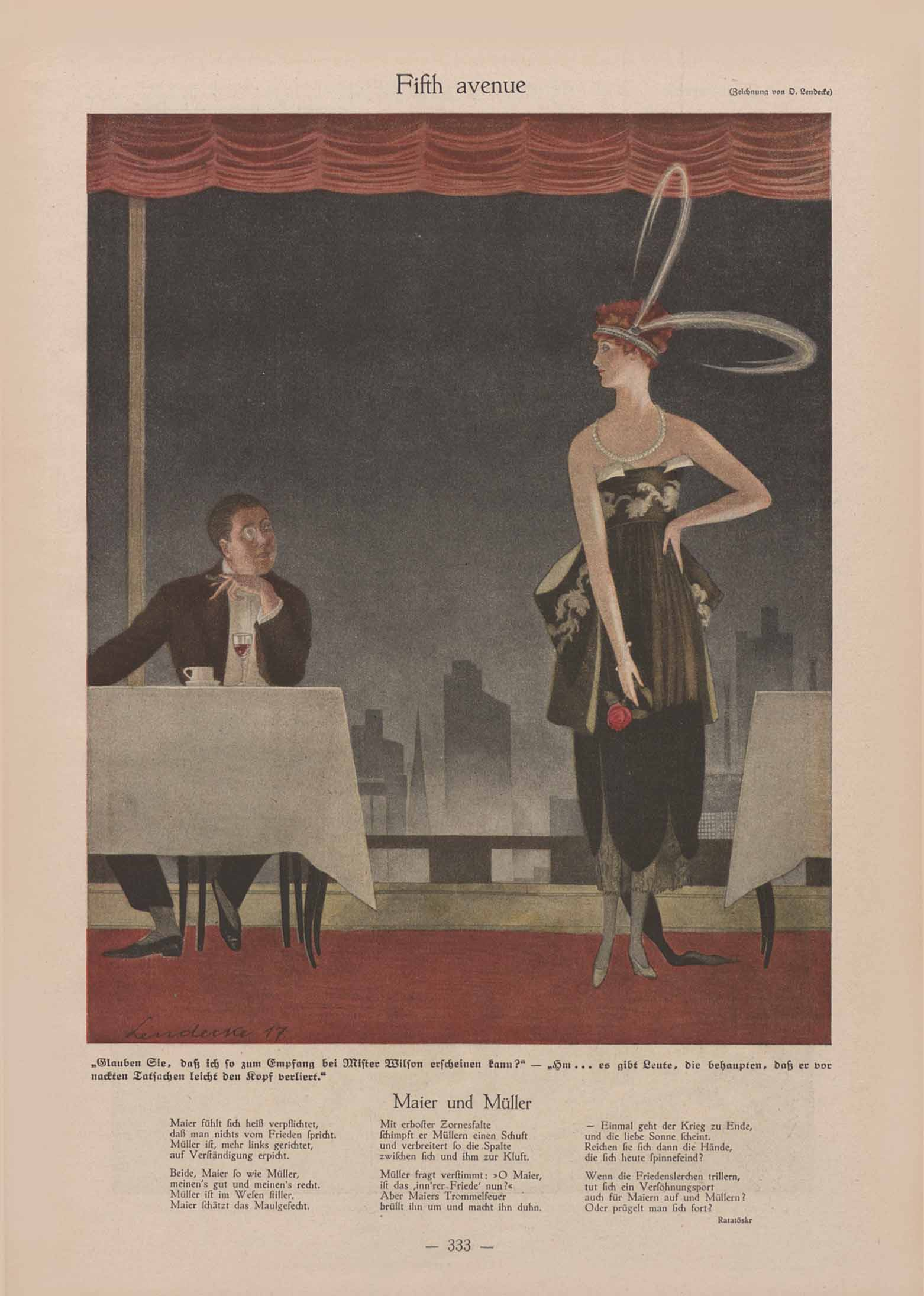
Illustration from 1917. Art by Otto Lendecke.

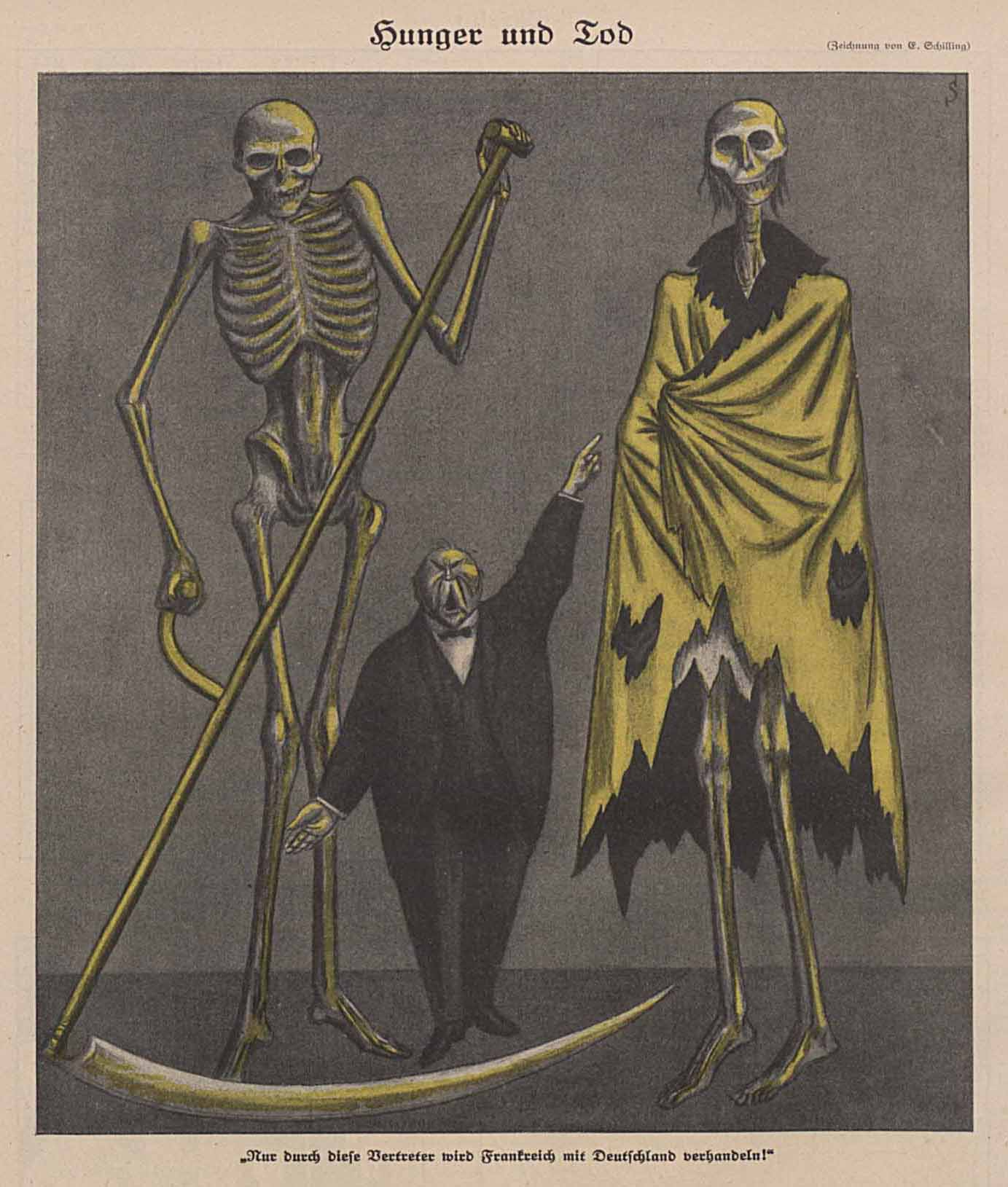
Cartoon from 1923. Art by Erich Schilling.

== See also ==
- Bauhaus
- Gesamtkunstwerk
- List of magazines in Germany
- Jugend (magazine)
- Jugendstil
- Pan (magazine)
- Secession (art)
- Ulenspiegel
