= Thomas Theodor Heine =

German artist

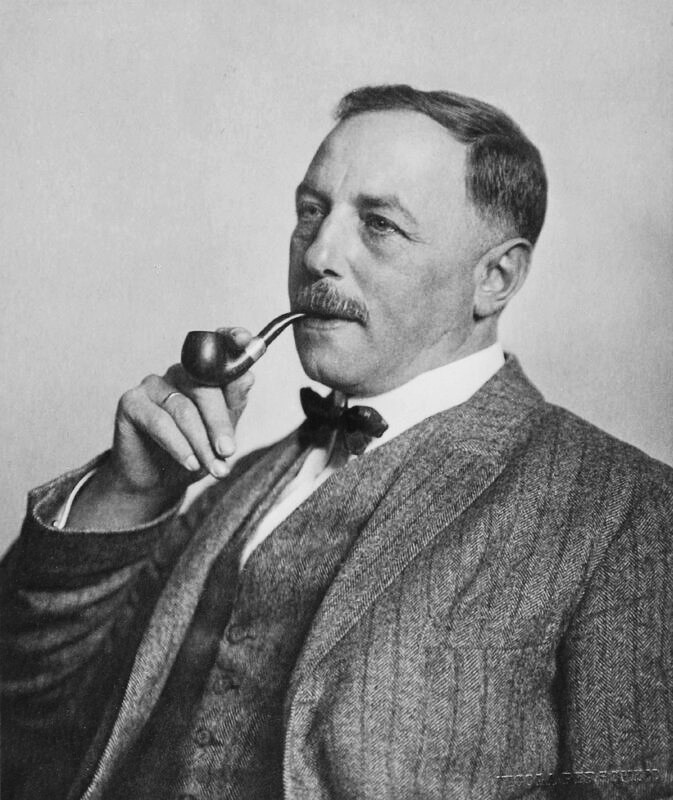
- Heine in 1915
- Born: 28 February 1867; Leipzig, Kingdom of Saxony
- Died: 26 January 1948 (aged 80); Stockholm, Sweden

Thomas Theodor Heine (28 February 1867 – 26 January 1948) was a German painter, illustrator and cartoonist. Born in Leipzig, Heine established himself as a gifted caricaturist at an early age, which led to him studying art at the Kunstakademie Düsseldorf and, briefly, at the Academy of Fine Arts in Munich.

In 1896, he became successful as an illustrator and political cartoonist for the satirical Munich magazine Simplicissimus, for which he appropriated the stylistic idiom of Jugendstil and the graphic qualities of Henri de Toulouse-Lautrec, Aubrey Beardsley and Japanese woodcuts. The illustrated critiques of social orders, and the monarchy in particular, that he made for the magazine led to a six-month sentence of fortress confinement in 1898. He also began work as a book illustrator in the 1890s.

He fled Germany in 1933, first to Prague. From 1938 until 1942 he lived in Oslo, and from 1942 until his death in 1948 he lived in Stockholm. He published a highly cynical autobiography in 1942 Ich warte auf Wunder (English: I Wait for Miracles).

While I Wait for Miracles claims neither to be autobiographical nor a roman à clef, it was written in 1941 while Hitler was in power in Germany and the Second World War was ongoing. Despite the author's protestations, it is a novel based upon the events of the day, and in particular the events in Munich during the German revolution of 1918–1919, the Bavarian Soviet Republic, and the rise of National Socialism from 1920 to 1925. Hitler is unfavorably portrayed as the character named "Icarus", a soldier who first mesmerizes Munich audiences in the chapter entitled "The Mass Meeting". It also depicts with less accuracy the 14 September 1921 assault by Hitler on the separatist Otto Ballerstedt, which resulted in Hitler being convicted and sentenced to 100 days in jail.

== Gallery ==
The mascot for the German satirical magazine Simplicissimus

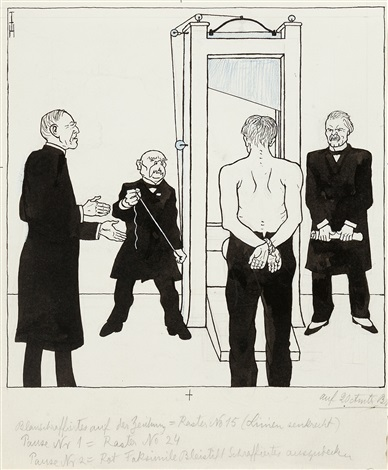
Versailles treaty

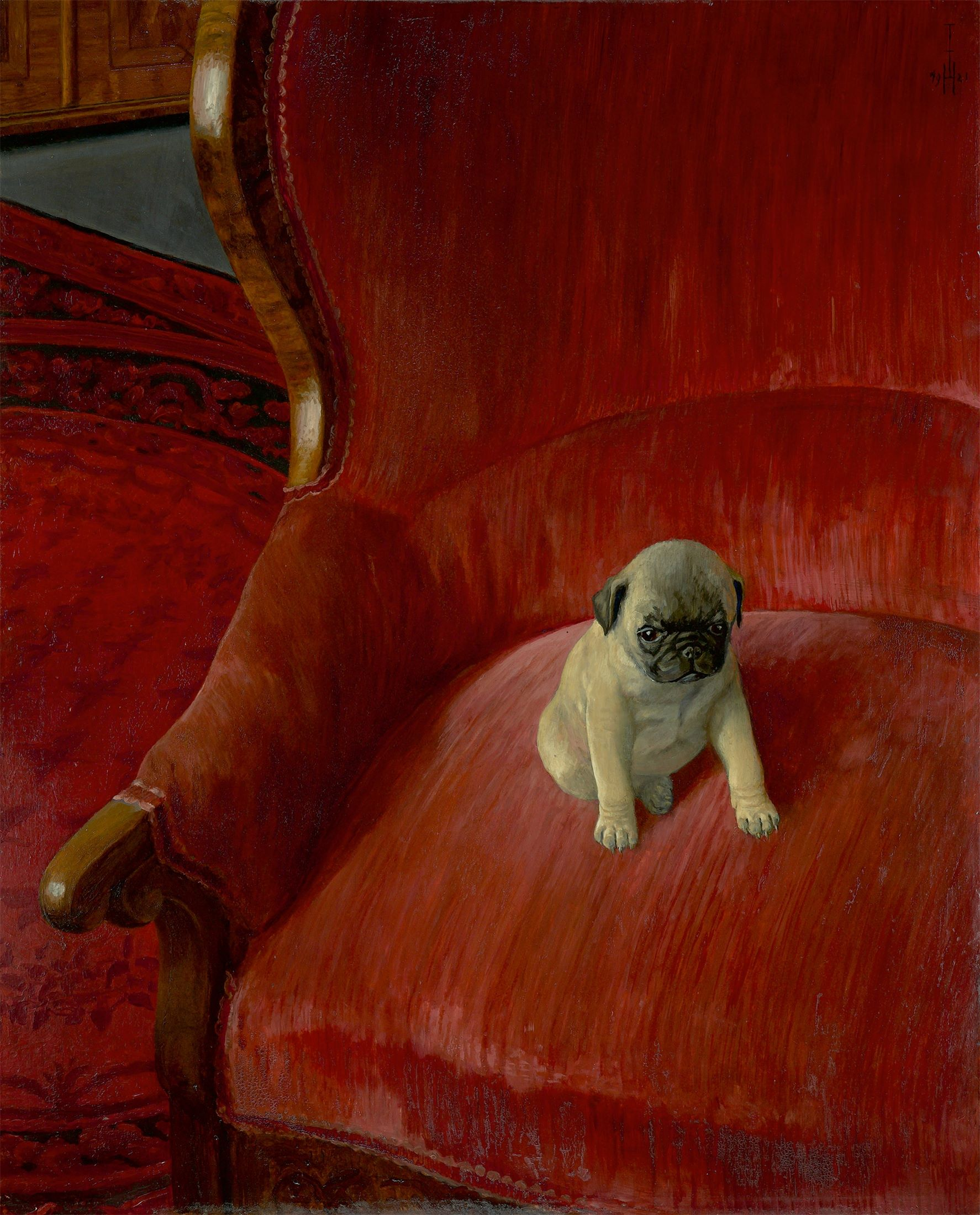
Siegfried, oil on panel, 1921

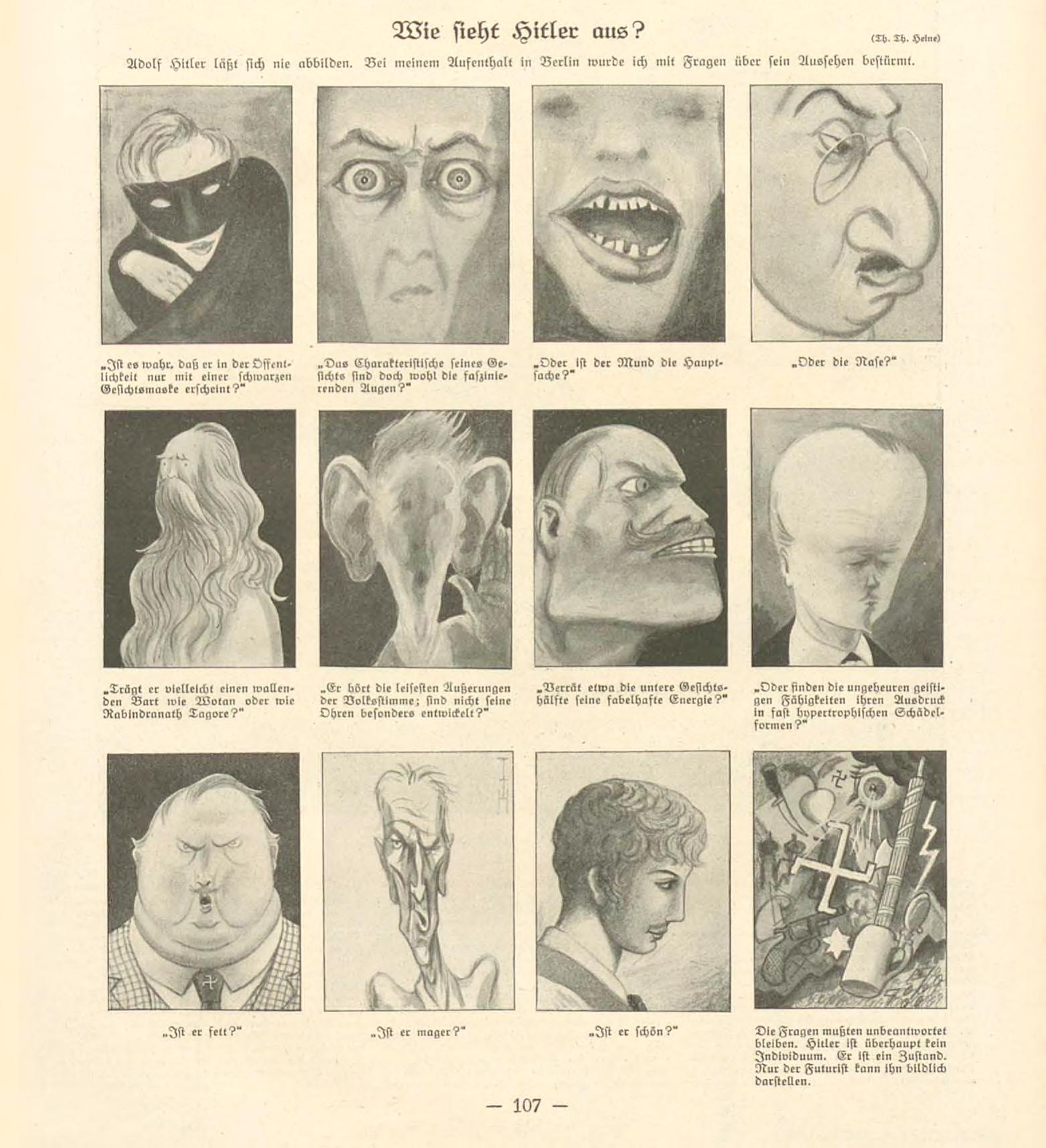
What Does Hitler Look Like? A satirical gallery from the 28 May 1923 issue of Simplicissimus when there were no publicly available photographs. Click for details.

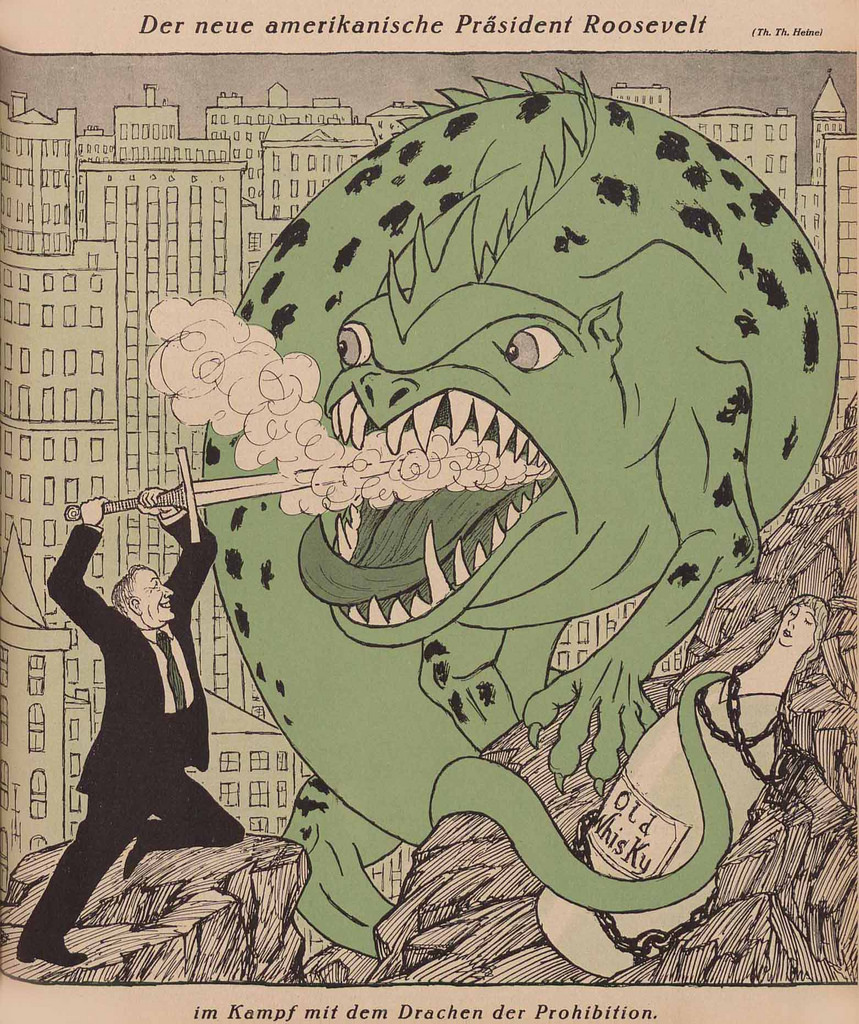
F.D. Roosevelt struggles with the dragon of prohibition, 1932
