= Matthias Zimprecht =

- Born: before August 15, 1624; Munich, Duchy of Bavaria, Holy Roman Empire
- Died: August 4, 1680; Prague, Kingdom of Bohemia
- Education: Kaspar Amort
- Known for: Painting

Matthias Zimprecht (ca. 1624 – 1680), native Bavarian, was a Bohemian painter, active in Prague from mid-1650s till 1680. His known work consists mostly of altar pieces but he was also a sought-after portraitist and author of gallery paintings.

== Life ==
Matthias Zimprecht (1624 Munich – 1680 Prague), in written sources named also Simbrecht, Simprecht, Zimbrecht, Cymprecht, Cymbrecht, Cimprecht, Sinbrecht, Cympret, Cimbert, was the eldest son of an employee at the elector's court Peter Zimprecht in Munich, trained at the court painter there Kaspar Amort (1612–1675). After 1646 he set out on the journeyman's path (he is proved in 1650 in Graz), he stayed in Italy, where under the influence of contemporary Roman painting (Pietro da Cortona) he finished shaping his artistic expression. From 1655, he is documented in Prague, where he worked until 1667 in the services of Count Wenzel Michna of Vacínov (Waitzenhofen) as a private painter. After the death of his patron, he settled in Prague's New Town and became the head of the painters’ guild there. From that time, it is possible to observe his painting activity more coherently – he supplied altarpieces for the churches there, but even in Lesser Town, he was also the author of portraits and very highly regarded gallery pieces, on which we unfortunately with some exceptions find out about from collection inventory lists.

== Oeuvre ==
With his colorfully vivid, truly Baroque expression, strongly marked by Italian (Cortona-like) painting, Zimprecht headed further than his Bohemian contemporaries Anton Stevens or Johann Friedrich Hess and simultaneously he represented an antipode to the more concentrated in expression and more dramatic in light Karel Škréta. With his death in the Great Plague Epidemic in 1680, epoch of the first creators of the Baroque art in Prague and Bohemia ends, his work represents a link to the generation emerging in the last decades of the 17th century, Johann Georg Heinsch, Johann Rudolf Byss, Johann Christoph Liška and Michael Wenzel Halbax.

== Gallery ==
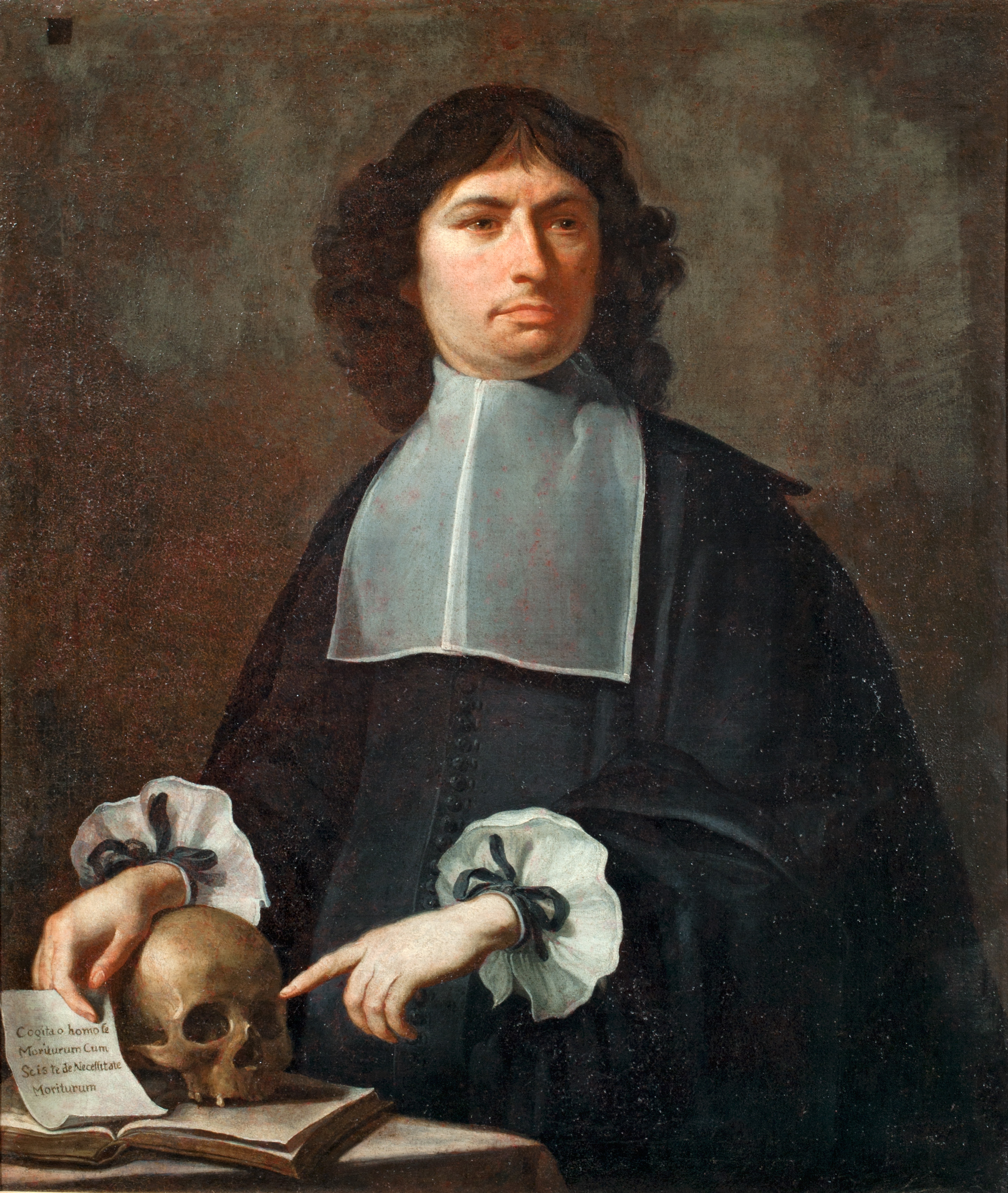
Matthias Zimprecht, Karel Kunata Dobřenský z Dobřenic from 1677, Muzeum Vysočiny in Jihlava

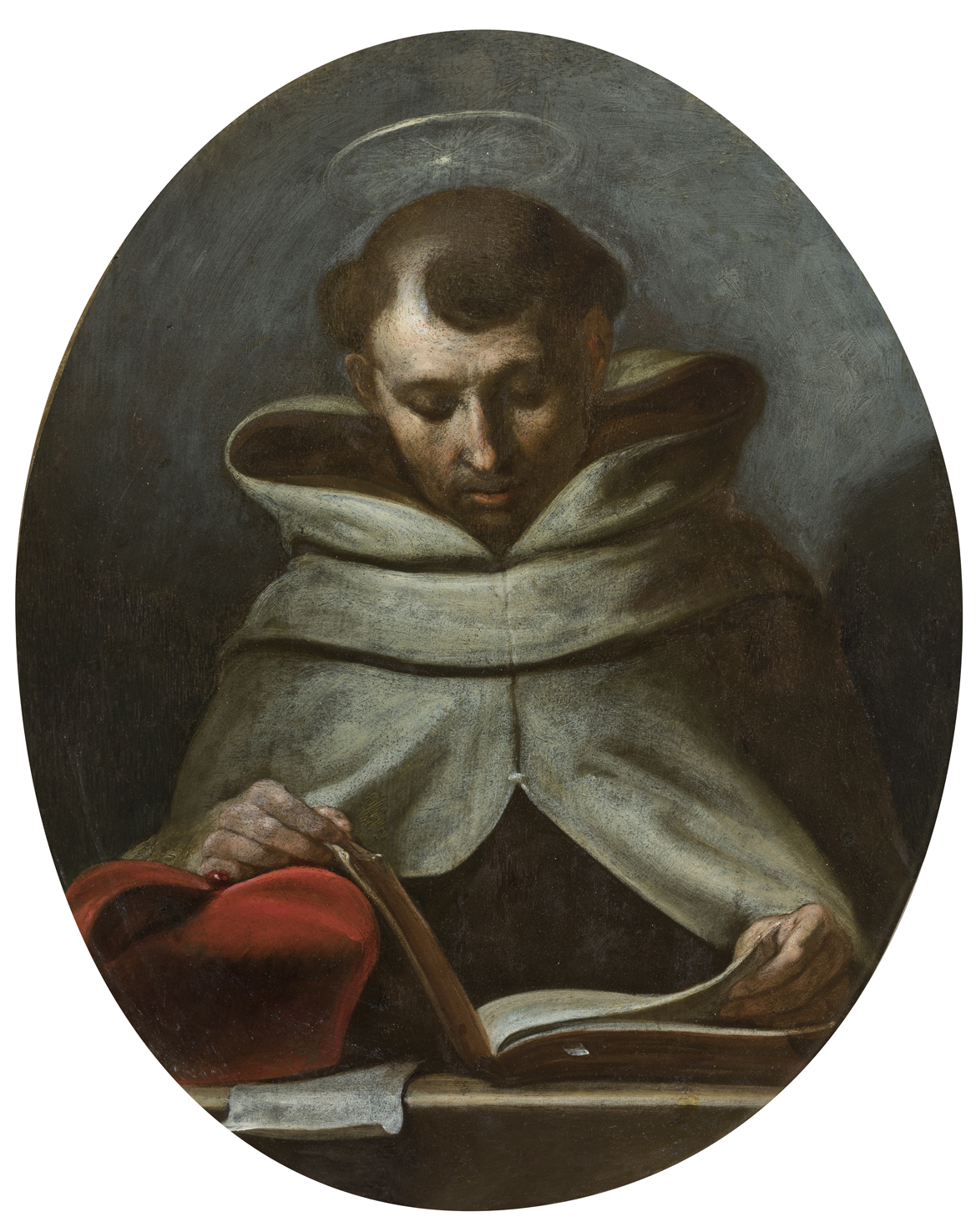
Matthias Zimprecht, Venerable Denis Perronet (1678) in the pulpit in the Church of Our Lady of Victory at the Lesser Quarter of Prague

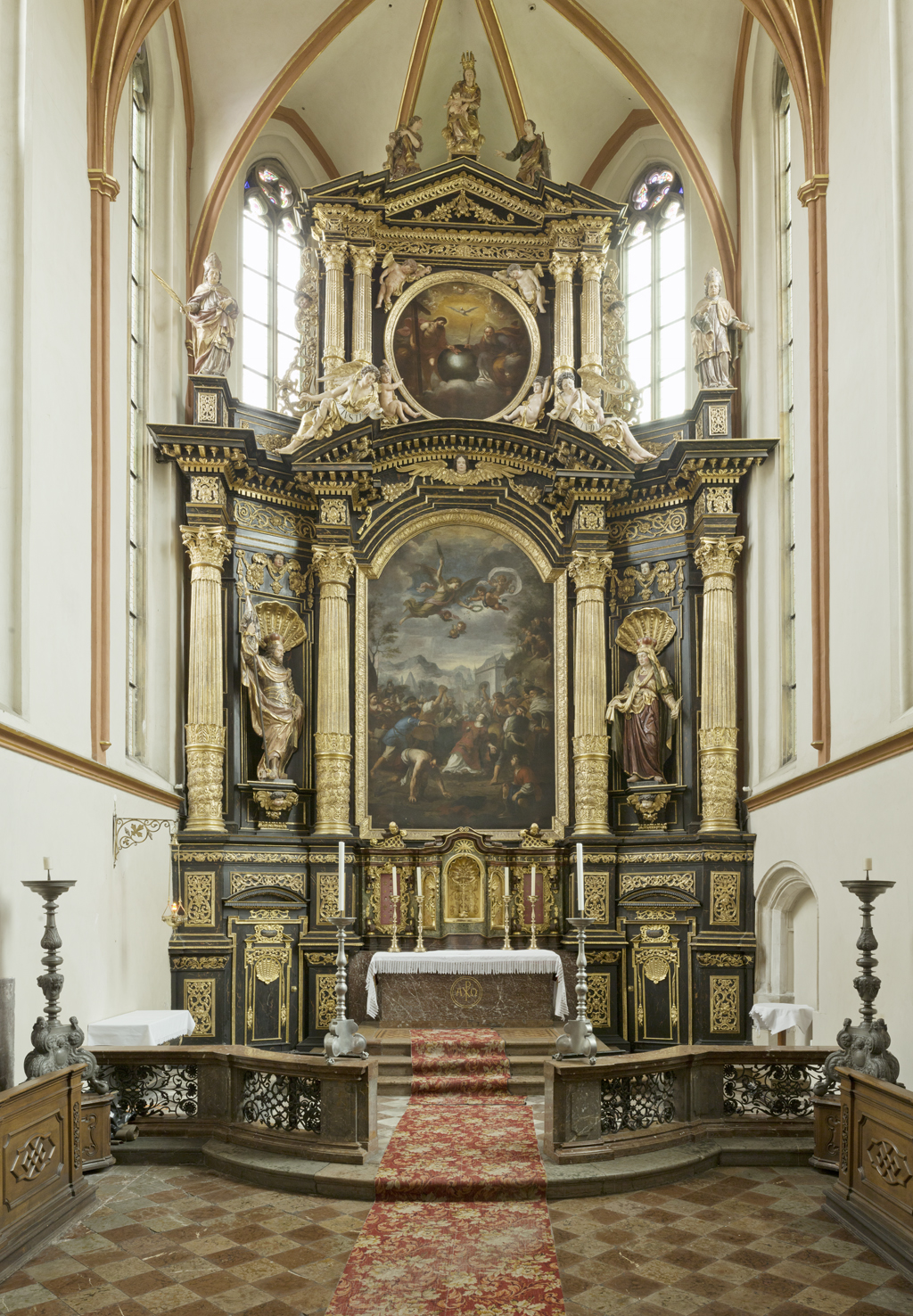
The Main Altare in the Church of St. Stephen in Prague's New Town with paintings by Matthias Zimprecht from 1669

== Bibliography ==
- Štěpán Vácha and Radka Heisslerová, Ve stínu Karla Škréty. Pražští malíři v letech 1635–1680. Antonín Stevens, Jan Bedřich Hess, Matěj Zimprecht [= In the Shadow of Karel Škréta. Prague Painters in 1635–1680. Anton Stevens, Johann Friedrich Hess, Matthias Zimprecht]. Prague: Academia, 2017. ISBN 978-80-200-2801-3
- Štěpán Vácha and Radka Heisslerová, Pražský malíř Matěj Zimprecht (1624–1680). Životopis umělce v limitech historické paměti [= Prague painter Matthias Zimprecht (1624–1680): Biography of an Artist within the Scope of Collective Memory ]. In: Umění/Art Vol. 60, 2012, pp. 255–280. ISSN 1804-6509
- Allgemeine Deutsche Biographie 45. Zeisberger–Zyrl, Nachtrag bis 1899: von Abendroth–Anderssen, Leipzig: Duncker & Humblot, 1900, pp. 577–578.
