= St. Sylvester, Schwabing =

Catholic church in Munich, Germany

St. Sylvester
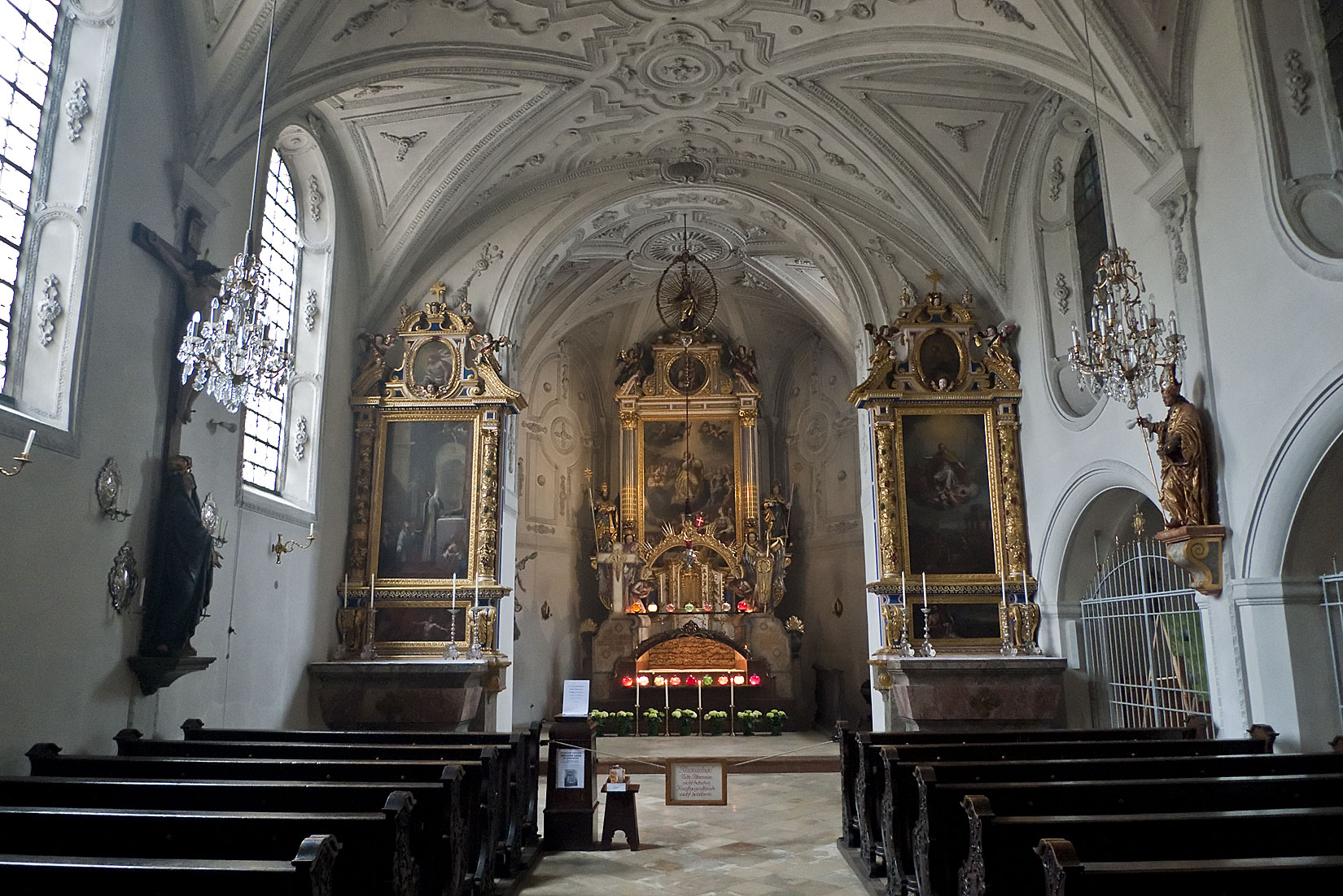
- Old church, interior

- Location within Bavaria Location within Germany
- 48°09′41″N 11°35′32″E
- Location: Munich-Schwabing, Bavaria
- Country: Germany
- Denomination: Catholic
- Website: pv-altschwabing.de/sankt-ursula/

History
- Dedication: Pope Silvester I (from 1921)

Architecture
- Functional status: Active
- Style: Gothic; Baroque; Baroque Revival
- Completed: 1925 (new church)

Administration
- Archdiocese: Munich and Freising

St. Sylvester is a Catholic church and parish in Schwabing, now part of Munich, in the German state (Bundesland) of Bavaria. It began with a village church in the 14th century, first documented in 1315, and dedicated to John the Baptist. A Gothic church was remodelled in Baroque style in the 17th century, and received furnishings such as sculpture attributed to Ignaz Günther or his school.

The parish was split and renamed, and the part with one of the oldest churches in Munich became a parish dedicated to Pope Silvester I in 1921. The church was expanded in 1925/26 by a new part connected to the old church. The new church features an altar painting depicting the patron saint kneeling in prayer for Schwabing, several other altars, and ceiling paintings in Casein technique including the vision of Constantine the Great, the emperor who granted free religion to the Christians while St. Sylvester was pope. The church is located in the center of the early village, near the Englischer Garten.

== History ==
The first mention of a church in the village of Schwabing dates back to 1315, but probably the village had already a church at the site when it was first documented in 782. The first dedication was probably to John the Baptist. Parts of the early church are part of the present structure. It was expanded around 1300 in Gothic style. From 1654 to 1664, it was remodelled in Baroque style, with a higher nave, new altars and stucco decoration. Probably at this time, Saint Ursula became the main patron saint, with Pope Silvester I as secondary patron saint.

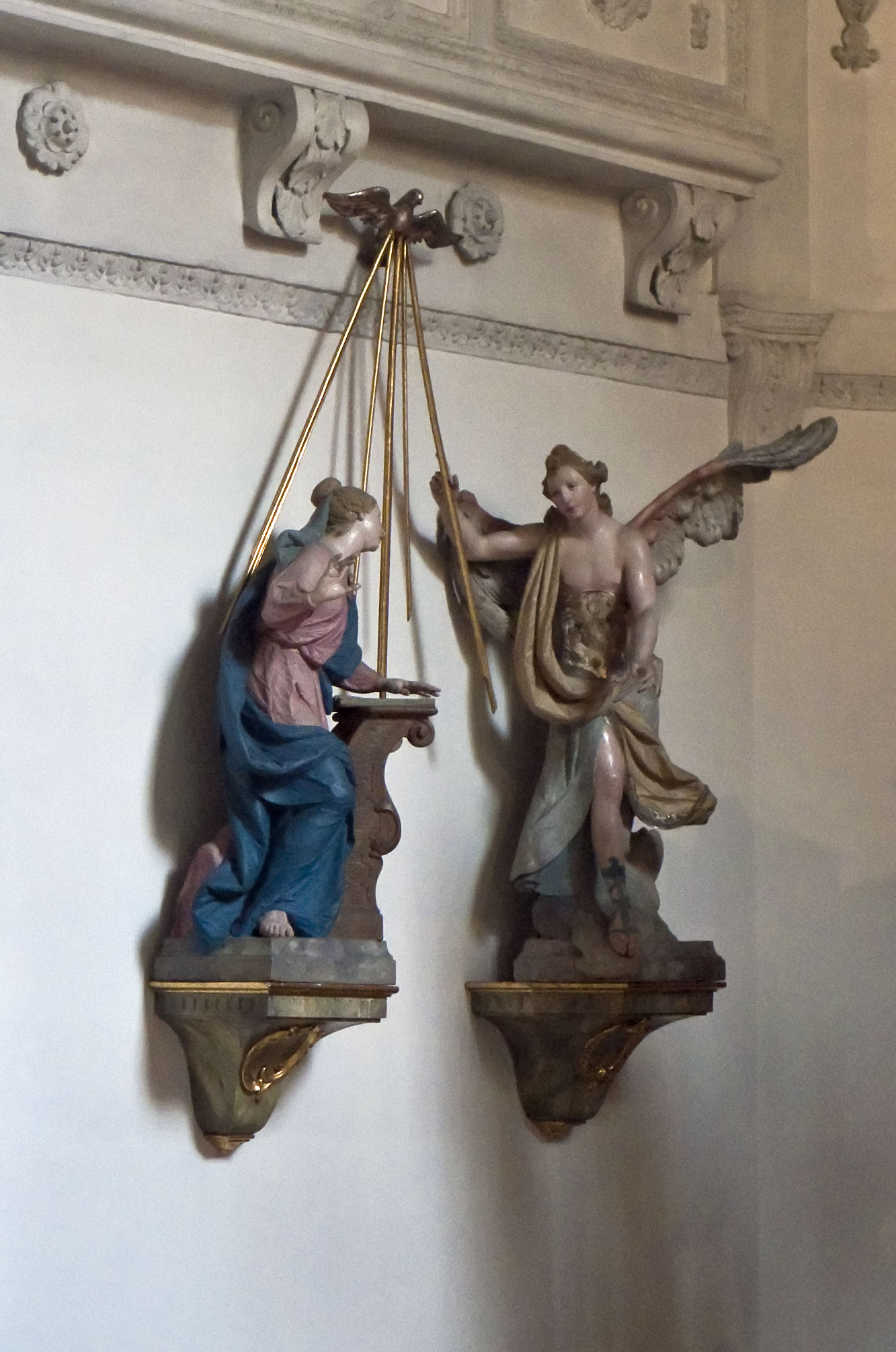
Annunciation attributed to Ignaz Günther or his school

The church features Baroque furnishings including the high altar from 1655, with a main painting by Kaspar Amort: Das Martyrium der heiligen Ursula und ihrer Gefährtinnen, focused on St. Ursula. Sculptures of St. Sylvester and St. Benno, the patron saint of Munich, were created by Matthias Schütz, probably in 1673. A group of sculptures depicting the Annunciation has been attributed to Ignaz Günther or his school. This and other works by the same school were acquired in 1770, also a figure of Judas Thaddäus, and busts of St. Benedict and St. Barbara. Two statues by Constantin Pader, of St. Nicholas and St. Elisabeth, dated to 1647, were moved to this church in 1898 from the then demolished "Leprosenkirche" St. Nikolaus in Schwabing.

In 1811, the church became the parish church of Schwabing. Due to the growing village, a new church was built and consecrated to St. Ursula in 1897. The former village church was then made a filial church. In 1921, the parish was split, and the new parish of St. Sylvester was created. Its church was expanded in 1925/26 by an octagonal hall, parallel to the old church in the north and connected to it. It was designed by Hermann Buchert in Baroque Revival style.

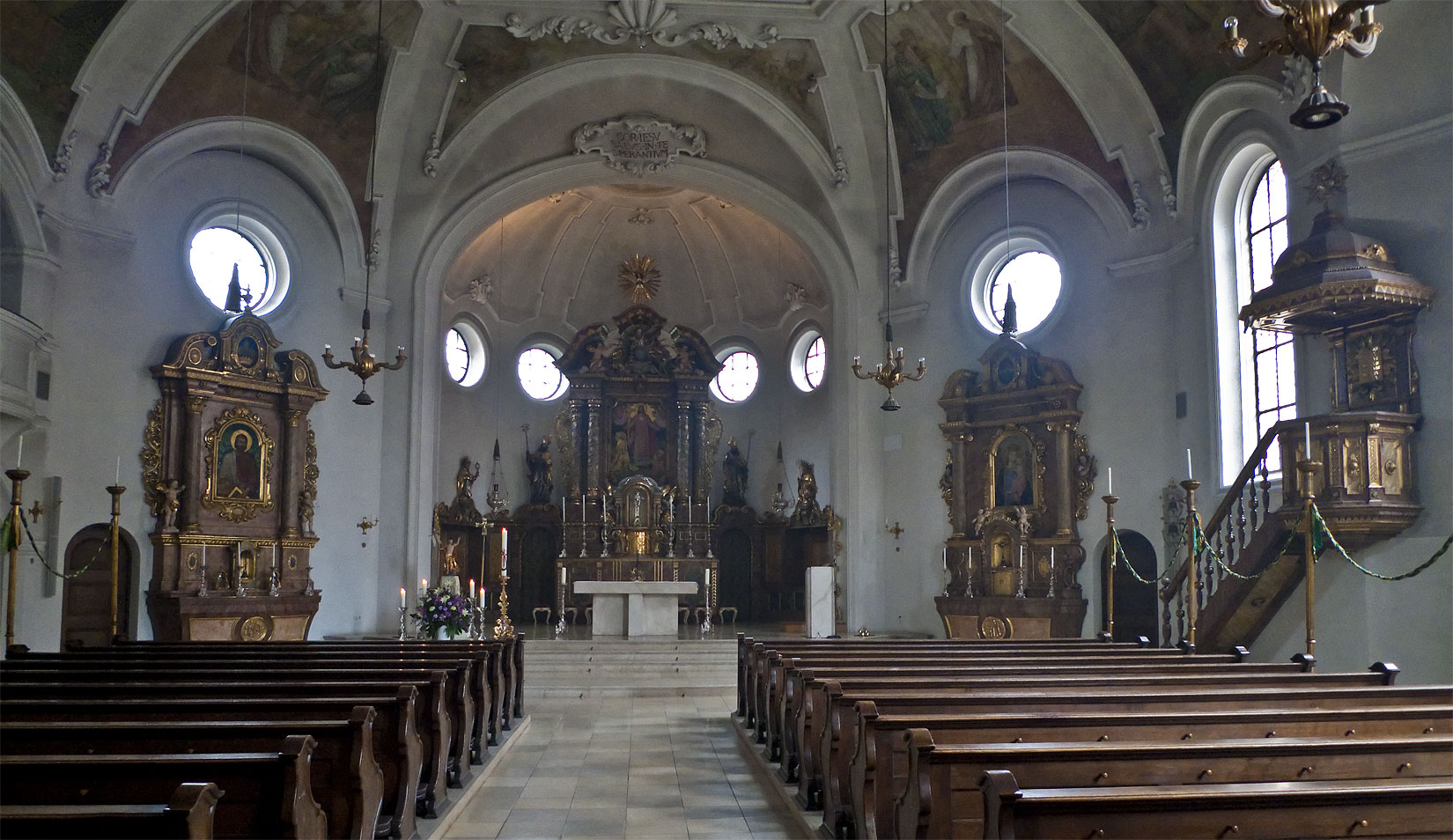
New church, interior

The new church features artworks including a painting on the high altar, depicting the patron saint kneeling in prayer for Schwabing (Papst Sylvester kniend in Fürbitte für Schwabing), created by Matthäus Schiestl in 1927. The figures on the side depict St. Nicholas and St. Korbinian, probably created by Meinrad Guggenbichler in the 18th century. The figure of God the Father in the Auszug (superstructure) of the altarpiece (Gottvater im Auszug) was probably made by Christian Jorhan in the same period. The casein paintings on the ceiling and upper walls were made by Ernst Kozicz in 1939/40. They depict the vision of Constantine the Great, the emperor who granted free religion to the Christians while St. Sylvester was pope, and six scenes from the Passion of Jesus and his Resurrection.

The exterior of the church was used as the filming location for Charlie Bucket's school in the 1971 movie musical Willy Wonka & the Chocolate Factory. After the title sequence, the story begins with an establishing shot of the steeple.
