= Blow Up (club) =

Nightclub in Munich, Germany

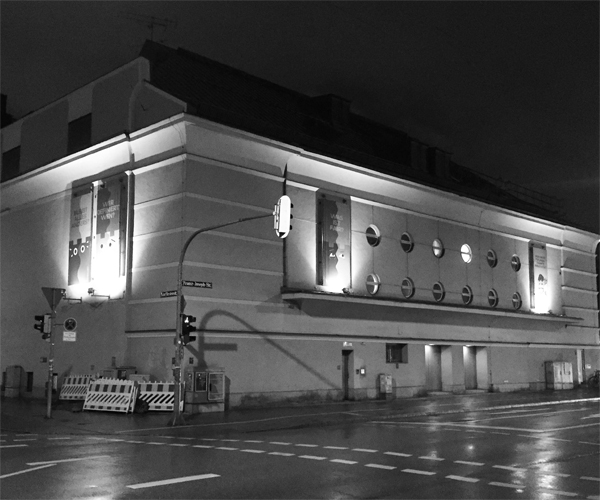
- The former Blow Up in 2019
- Interactive map of Blow Up
- Address: Elisabethplatz, 80801 Munich
- Location: Schwabing, Munich, Germany
- Coordinates: 48°9′26.9″N 11°34′31.4″E
- Operator: Samy brothers
- Capacity: 2,500
- Type: nightclub

Construction
- Built: 1926
- Opened: 1967
- Closed: 1972

The Blow Up (1967–1972) was a nightclub in Munich and Germany's first large-scale discotheque. During its existence, the nightclub was the favorite topic of magazines and daily newspapers because of countless happenings, drug stories and its psychedelic light projections. The British Pathé described the club as being "the hottest and most expensive happening center in West Germany. It's wild, it's way-out, it's with it, it's got everything."

== History and description ==
The nightclub was founded in 1967 by the Samy brothers in a former cinema that had been erected in 1926 in Munich's Schwabing district and named after Michelangelo Antonioni's 1966 film Blow Up. The brothers Temur and Anusch Samy (called "The kings of the flower power era in Schwabing"), who were of Iranian descent and the first concept- and event gastronomers in Germany, founded a business empire including several nightclubs, pubs, restaurants, underground bars, a brewery, a shopping center called Citta 2000 and a cab company, and were described by contemporary witnesses and business partners as trendsetters who established a whole new kind of gastronomy trade in Munich that changed all of the city. Blow Up, their masterpiece, had multiple levels and platforms on which the bands could play and the go-go girls dance, as well as gangways from which the guests could reach the different levels and watch the main dancefloor, which was "bombarded" by the flashes of 250 stage lights and light projectors. One of the innovations was that the stage lights reacted to the rhythm of the music, which marked the beginning of synchronized light shows in discotheques. The Samy brothers invested 850,000 German marks just for the installations of the club.

Up to 5,000 people tried to squeeze into the building for the opening party, and only 1,600 tickets had been sold until the pressure of the throng could no longer to be withstood and the crowd stormed the building. 3,500 people made it in, a thousand more than officially allowed. Men in smoking overthrew the box office and pinched a stack of receipts, a prominent PR consultant got his glasses beaten out of his face, and a young man took possession of the microphone, praised Rudi Dutschke and accused the Federal Republic of Germany of economic exploitation. Others pulled down the iron railings or painted professions of sympathy for the Viet Cong onto the walls. These actions were partly tolerated, as the club owner Samy regarded the place as an "action center", which included "the participance of the audience" and that things that were knocked over or painted by the crowd should not be restored. The premiere event featured the London soul band Robert Hirst and The Big Taste the DJ Dave Lee Travis of Radio Caroline, the Gerhard-Wilson go-go girls from Paris, psychedelic light projections and a wild "paint-in", where participants threw pounds of paint at each other. In the meantime, hundreds of cars of visitors around the nightclub were fined for parking illegally. The legendary first night in the Blow Up ended with a tear gas attack which drove the crowd to a hasty departure.

In the following years the nightclub was the favorite topic of magazines and daily newspapers because of way-out happenings such as paint-ins, wet pool parties on the dancefloor, film screenings or "multimedia discos", the drug stories around the nightclub, its psychedelic light projections, as well as the high-profile artist bookings. Artists who performed at the Blow Up included Jimi Hendrix (who gave his first live performances in Germany at the Blow Up), Pink Floyd, Yes, Sammy Davis Jr., Bill Haley, Amon Düül, Julie Driscoll Tippetts, and Brian Auger. The nightclub also was in the headlines because of further highlights such as the visit of novelist Günter Grass, who gave readings between go-go girls, visits by the communards Fritz Teufel, Uschi Obermaier and Rainer Langhans, the later RAF terrorist Andreas Baader, and by other celebs such as actress Uschi Glas, Peter Kraus, Gunter Sachs or Prince Johannes of Thurn and Taxis.

In 1970, Anusch died in a plane crash close to St. Moritz. Following his death, his brother Temur was unable to manage the club, and "Munich's biggest beat sensation" closed in 1972. Eventually the city of Munich bought the building, which since 1993 houses a theater called Schauburg.
