= St. Stephen's Church, Prague =

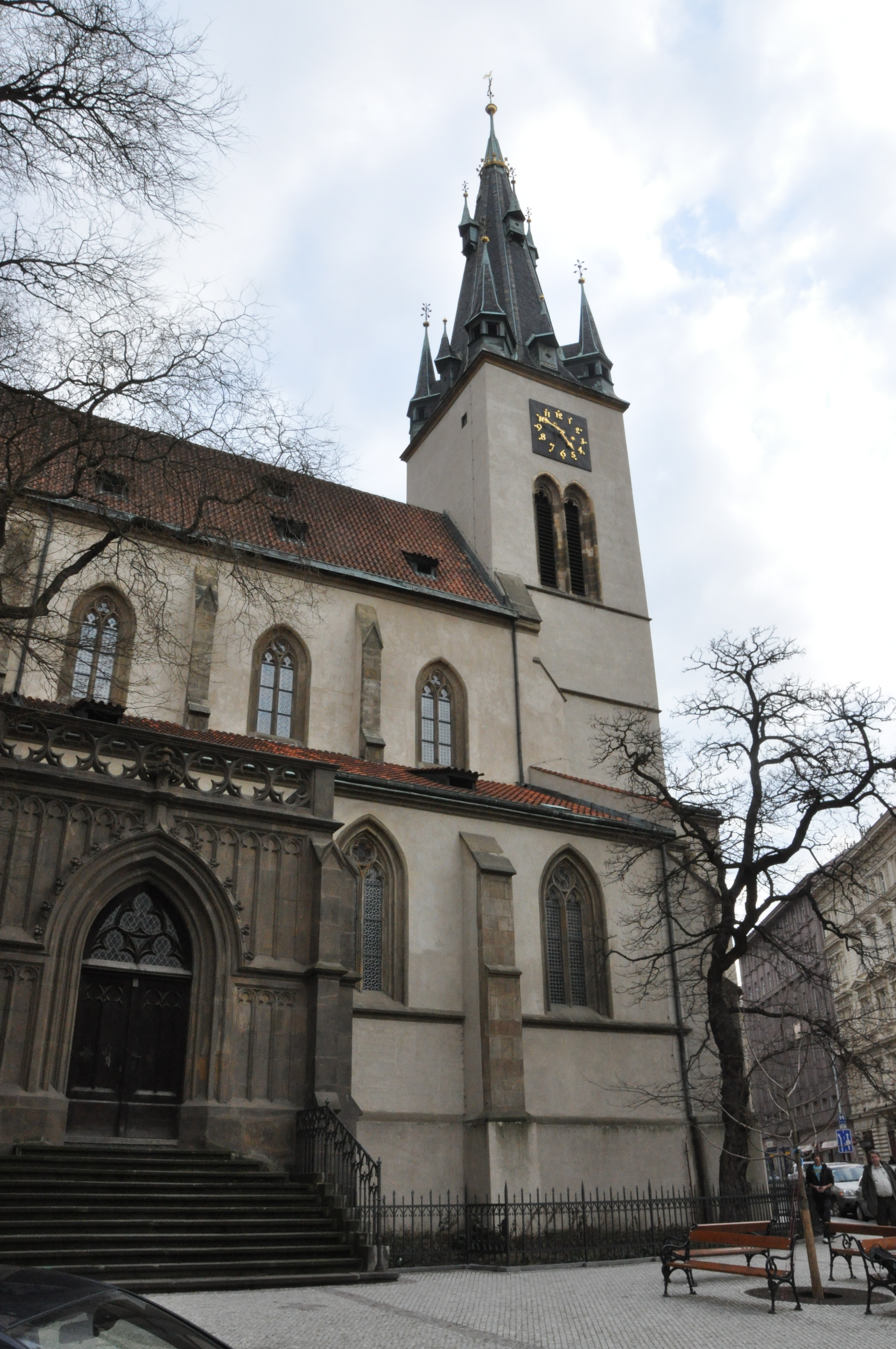
St. Stephen's Church in Prague

The St. Stephen's Church (Czech: Kostel svatého Štěpána) is located in Štěpánská street in Prague 2, New Town. It is a church from the second half of the 14th century, which was built near the Romanesque St. Stephen rotunda. The church was dedicated to St. Stephen, traditionally regarded as the first martyr of Christianity, who was, according to the Acts of the Apostles, a deacon in the early church at Jerusalem who aroused the enmity of members of various synagogues by his teachings. And then rotunda was dedicated to St. Longin.

== History ==
The church of St. Stephen was founded together with New Town (on 3 March 1348) by Charles IV. (1316 – 1378), the King of Bohemia and also the Holy Roman Emperor, founder of New Town - a quarter outside the city walls, the youngest and largest of the five independent towns that today comprise the historic center of modern Prague. An avid collector and admirer of relics, he obtained the remains of St. Stephen in Rome and donated them to the church. The St. Stephen Church served as a parish church for the upper part of New Town (in the lower part of New Town this function is fulfilled by the Church of St Henry and St Kunnigunde). At first the church was managed by the order of Knights of the Cross with the Red Star (Czech: Křižovníci), just when Charles IV. received most of the land for the founding of New Town. The church was built in the years 1351 – 1401, when the main builder master George is mentioned. Completion of the western tower is dated to the year 1401, when the whole church must have already been built. The church also had a large lot, filling most of the space between the present-day streets Štěpánská, Ječná, Na Rybníčku and Žitná. There was a parish garden and a large cemetery. During the plague epidemic in 1502, more than fifteen thousand people were buried there. Several buildings were there: a rectory (in the southwest corner), a school, a wooden belfry (which was rebuilt in stone in the early 17th century), the Chapel of All Saints, Jerusalem chapel, as well as the rotunda of St. Login. In 1686, the Cornel Chapel was built to the south wall of the nave and then the Branberger Chapel to the north wall of the sacristy, which was opened in 1739. In 1866 a Neo-Gothic hall was built in the north part of the nave. A known restorer of that time, Josef Mocker, redesigned and restored the church in a puristic style in 1874 – 1879. He was responsible for restoring many Bohemian castles and ancient buildings in Prague. His work in a puristic Gothic Revival style aroused much controversy, but also contributed to many important landmarks of Prague. Here Josef Mocker designed a new tracery in the presbytery, a new window in the nave, and also a frontage in the aisle. Nowadays, the church is managed by the Roman Catholic parish of St. Stephen and is owned by the Archdiocese of Prague.

=== General characteristic ===
The church is built as a Gothic basilica with three naves and a presbytery with a polygonal ending in the east. The sacristy buildings, a tower in the frontage, two Baroque chapels and a Neo-Gothic hall are adjacent to the main building. The main nave with the chancel are covered by a gable roof, hipped in the eastern part. The sacristy with Baroque working is located between the northern wall of the presbytery and the eastern wall of the northern aisle.

=== The main nave, side naves, presbytery ===
The unit of the three naves, which has almost a square layout, is designed as a basilica. The main nave is divided into four rectangular fields vaulted with a ribbed cross vault. The vault profile is identical to the profile of diagonal ribs which are pear-shaped, resting on a round shaft, which continues to the ground. The nave is elevated by about one third of the height of the church above the aisles. In the west the nave is supported by a powerful buttress, which adjoins to the wall of the tower, on the sides it is supported by four graduated slender linchpins, which are finished by gables. The aisles are broken by four lancet windows with tracery. The nave along with the chancel are covered by tiles. As the nave, the aisles are also divided into four fields, this time almost square floor plan. The fields are also arched over with ribbed cross vaults. The room of these three naves is divided by three pairs of massive prismatic pillars with the main support function of arches. The aisles are covered in slate. To the southern side of the nave in southwest corner are two graduated abutments. ("They show the fact that according to original plans the tower was at first supposed to be built above the westernmost field of the southern nave. The wall is also thicker there. This intention was later abandoned and the tower was built on its current site.") In the southern aisle, there is another backrest along with a window to the west and three cuspidate windows to the south side. An early Baroque rectangular chapel later extended the second bay from the west. Abutments of the north side of the nave are deployed in the same way as in the south aisle, but the corner one is designed as oblique. Here again are three cuspidate Gothic windows and in the third field from the west is placed a Neo-Gothic hall built by Josef Mocker. The northern aisle passes to a square sacristy with two semicircular closed windows, between which the Baroque Branberger Chapel is located. From this aisle it is possible to enter into a Neo-Gothic stone hall, which is covered with a cuspidate portal with crabs and pinnacles. This Neo-Gothic portal is accessible due to a narrowing stone staircase.

The presbytery fluently continues to the nave of the church. The presbytery consists of two rectangular bays arched over with ribbed cross vaults and five-sides concluding with a six-beam vault. The room of the chancel and of the nave are separated by just a plain, slightly angled triumphal arch with an almost rectangular profile. The height of the nave is sixteen meters, proportioned at a 2:1 ratio. The chancel is supported by eight back rests of the same type as in the nave, but now twice graded and more massive. Between the abutments there are six high lancet windows.

=== Tower of the church ===
In the western frontage, to the axis of the church is designed a quadrangular massive steeple, which is covered with a Neo-Gothic helmet, high tent roof with small corner spires designed by Josef Mocker in 1875. A previous tower roof from 1605 fell down during a big storm in 1870. The fifty-seven meter high tower is irregularly divided by four band cornices and lies on a cubic pedestal with a single profiled cornice. On the west side of the tower on the second floor is a small walled alcove, on the third floor a large Gothic window divided into three parts, again designed by Josef Mocker, and on the fifth floor an architecturally simple double Gothic window. At the top, a modern clock is placed below the eaves of the roof. The walls of the tower are mortared. Two staircases are connected to the tower, a spiral staircase with continuous windows with chamfered jambs on the south side, on the north side a renaissance rectangular staircase, which also covers the western frontage of the north aisle. On the ground floor of the tower there is a renaissance portal, which is semi-circularly arched and currently serves as the main entrance to the temple.

== Chapel of Cornel ==
The chapel, which adjoints the aisle and disrupts the almost regular arrangement of the plan, was added to the church in 1686. The chapel is from the west and the east sides illuminated by narrow semicircular windows. In the south wall is a blind stone portal with a profilated jamb. The interior of the chapel is mostly Baroque: grating with wrought flowers, dating from around 1680, which separates the chapel from the main temple area. The room is vaulted by dome on pendentives which stretch, resting on an entablature supported by corner pilasters. The chapel is dominated by an early Baroque wooden portal altar "A Descent (snímání) From the Cross" with statues of St. John Baptist and St. Gregory. The title painting is excellent work by Matthias Zimprecht, an outstanding German Baroque painter creating in Prague in the second half of the 17th century.

== Chapel Branberger ==
The chapel was added to the church in 1736. It is not possible to enter directly from the interior of the church, but it is an exterior chapel in the form of a deep Baroque niche. The chapel is bordered by two corner pilasters, which pass to a profiled archivolt through an entablature. The room is decorated with a fresco of the Last Judgement from 1739 and is closed by a metal bar. An altar with an obelisk is located here as well.

== Interior – equipment of the church ==
The interior of the church is dominated by an early baroque wooden three-storey portal main altar, painted in black and gilded, with the picture "Stoning of St. Stephen" and in the attachment with a picture of the Holy Trinity by Matthias Zimprecht. The altar is bordered by sculptures of St. Wenceslas, St. Ludmila and sculptures of Madonna, kneeling St. John Evangelist and St. Mary Magdalene in the extender. The church has a number of side altars; in the north aisle there is the altar of the baptism of Christ, the altar of St. Anne, and the altar of the Virgin Mary (P. Marie Svatoštěpánská). In the south aisle are the altar of the Mother of Sorrow (P. Marie Bolestná) and altar of St. Rosalia. A pulpit with a gothic stone rostrum was built around 1500. It has an early Baroque roof – a baldachin with four columns, volutes and a sculpture of St. Salvator. In the north aisle is a tin baptismal font in the shape of an inverted bell. There are fourteen pictures showing the way of the cross on the perimeter wall by Antonín Lhota from 1880. The walls of the church are provided by Gothic mural paintings, which are dated to the period after the year 1450.

== Belfry ==
There is a freestanding belfry next to the church in the area of the former cemetery. It was built in the location of an older, wooden tower in 1600–1604. The bells were used for guns during the World War I and World War II, except the bell Stephen weighing about two tons from 1490. It was made by New Town bellfounder George.

== Curiosities ==
In the church is buried the most famous Czech Baroque sculptor Matthias Bernard Braun. Though he was born in Austrian Innsbruck, he became the most significant sculptor of the Czech Baroque period, whose most famous sculptures are probably the allegories of Virtues and Vices situated at the Kuks Hospital. So many coffins were found in the tomb in 1902 that the coffin of the noted sculptor Braun could not be detected.

On 29 August 1849, there was a wedding of the Czech classical music composer Antonín Dvořák, the author of the world-famous symphony From the New World, a successful opera Rusalka, and also a piano cycle Humoresques. After this his son-in law, composer and violinist Josef Suk, married Dvořak's daughter Otylka there as well.

== Literature ==
- KOŠNÁŘ, Julius. Staropražské pověsti a legendy. Praha : Vincentinum, 1933. Dostupné online. - kapitola O zvonu Lochmaru u sv. Štěpána na Novém Městě pražském, s. 71-76.
- MIKOVEC, Ferdinand Břetislav. Starožitnosti a Památky země České. Ilustrace Josef Vojtěch Hellich, Vilém Kandler. Praha : Kober a Markgraf, [1860]. Dostupné online. -kapitola Kostel sv. Štěpána v Praze, s. 12-24.
- PLACHÁ - GOLLEROVÁ, Jitka. Kostel sv. Štěpána a kaple sv. Lognina. Praha : Poklady národního umění, 1940.
- LÍBAL, Dobroslav. Pražské gotické kostely. Praha : Antonín Kovanda Praha.
- KALINA, KOŤÁTKO, Pavel, Jiří. Praha 1310 - 1419, kapitoly o vrcholné gotice. Praha : Libri, 2004.
- BAŤKOVÁ, Růžena. Umělecké památky Prahy 2. - Nové Město, Vyšehrad. Praha : Academia, 1998. 840 s.
- RYBÁR, Ctibor. Ulice a domy města Prahy. Praha : Victoria Pub., 1995. 540 s.
- DAVID, Petr. 111 památek a zajímavostí Prahy. Praha : Kartografie Praha, 2001. 350 s.
