= Hans Rottenhammer =

German painter

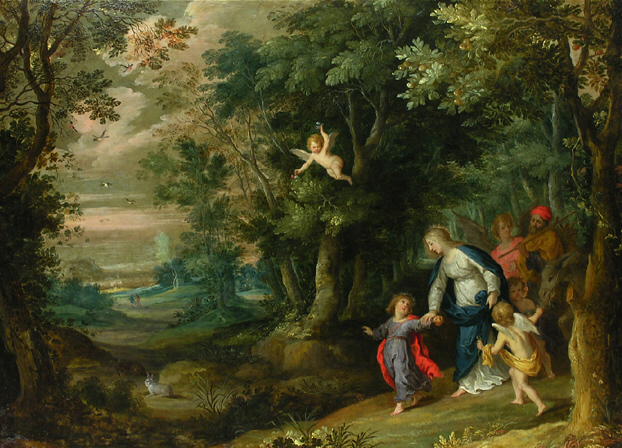
Flight into Egypt by Rottenhammer (figures) and Jan Brueghel the Elder (landscape)

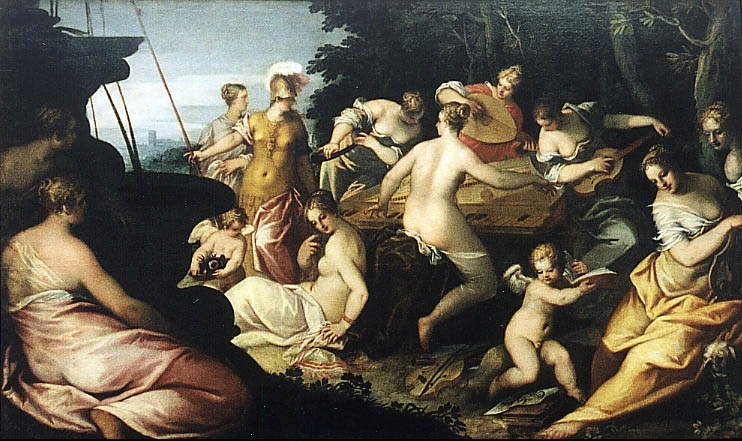
Minerva and the Muses, by Hans Rottenhammer, painted 1603

Johann Rottenhammer, or Hans Rottenhammer (1564 – 14 August 1625), was a German painter. He specialized in highly finished paintings on a small scale.

== Biography ==
He was born in Munich, where he studied until 1588 under Hans Donauer the Elder. In 1593–94 (and perhaps earlier) he was in Rome, and he then settled in Venice from 1595 or 1596 until 1606, before returning to Germany and settling in Augsburg, working also in Munich. He died in Augsburg, apparently in some poverty, and according to some sources an alcoholic.

== Work ==
In Venice he gained a reputation for small highly finished cabinet paintings on copper, of religious and mythological subjects, combining German and Italian elements of style. The use of copper supports for painting was increasingly popular in this period due to greater availability of copper, as well as a desire to replicate the impact it had on painted subjects, imbuing them with luminosity (for which Rottenhammer was well known). In particular he combines the landscape tradition of the North with the compositional and figure styles of Tintoretto and Veronese. While in Venice, Rottenhammer made a copy of Albrecht Dürer's painting Feast of the Rosary, until the 19th century in the possession of the Grimani family in Venice, but since considered missing. He was the first German artist to specialize in cabinet paintings. In Rome he knew the earlier members of the Bamboccianti, a circle of Northern artists (before the name itself arose), and remained in regular contact with Paul Bril, a Flemish artist living in Rome, sending him plates with the figures painted on for Bril to supply the landscape, according to a dealer's letter of 1617. He also collaborated with Jan Brueghel the Elder in a similar way. He was commissioned in 1600 to paint a Feast of the Gods for Emperor Rudolph II (now Hermitage). A good example of his early style, in which he approaches Tintoretto, is his Death of Adonis in the Louvre.

Once back in Germany, he worked on larger altarpieces and decorative schemes for palaces, including the Munich Residenz and Schloss Bückeborg(Goldener Saal), more in the style of Northern Mannerism than his Italian work.

He is believed to have employed Adam Elsheimer as an assistant in 1598 or 1599, and no doubt gave Elsheimer an introduction to Bril; when Elsheimer moved on to Rome he and Bril became close friends. Two drawings by Rottenhammer (now in Copenhagen) belonged to Elsheimer, and have an inscription noting they were a gift from Rottenhammer. Elsheimer's mature paintings are all small and on copper, and continue to develop Rottenhammer's synthesis of German and Italian styles, and use of landscape. Among his noted works are those painted for Emperor Rudolph II of Austria: Nativity (1608), Battle Between Centaurs and Lapithæ, and four others, in the Vienna Museum.

== Galleries ==
There are paintings in the main galleries in London, Munich (3), Augsburg, Berlin, Cambridge, St Petersberg, Amsterdam (2), Schwerin, Milan, Los Angeles, Dunedin and elsewhere. Most of his altarpieces and decorative schemes can still be seen in situ.
