= Big Apple (club) =

Nightclub in Munich, Germany

- Address: Leopoldstraße 23, 80801 Munich
- Location: Schwabing, Munich, Germany
- Coordinates: 48°9′27.8″N 11°35′3.8″E
- Type: nightclub

Construction
- Opened: 1963
- Closed: 1975
- Demolished: 2013

The Big Apple was a nightclub in Munich's Schwabing district from 1963 to 1975 and, together with the PN hit-house, formed the center of the southern German beat and rock music culture during the Swinging Sixties.

== History ==
The Big Apple opened in 1963 a few months after the Schwabinger Krawalle riots at Leopoldstraße 23 in the then trendy Munich district of Schwabing. Influenced by the African-American culture of the troops of the United States European Command, soul music was initially predominant in the Big Apple. The club's first DJ was Jürgen Herrmann, the later presenter and music editor at Bayerischer Rundfunk.

Later, the initially pure discotheque also hosted concerts, for which beer tables were tied together and served as a stage. Among the first bands to perform live at the Big Apple were The Yardbirds, The Spencer Davis Group, The Animals and Deep Purple. The house band of the club was Amon Düül, who always played on Mondays with their own PA system. The club's audience was made up of students, young employees, and G.I.s.

In November 1966, the then unknown Jimi Hendrix and his band The Jimi Hendrix Experience played their first gigs in Germany in the Big Apple. At this occasion Hendrix had a show experience that would define him from then on: when trying to escape in panic from a frenetic audience that had pulled him off the stage, he smashed his guitar for the first time in a sound explosion on stage, which was perceived by the audience as part of the show. When Hendrix's manager Chas Chandler observed the audience's reaction, he decided to include the guitar destruction as a permanent feature of the Experience's show in the future.

The club's inner circle also included Uschi Obermaier, who later wrote in her book "High Times. Mein wildes Leben" about the numerous, wild nights in her regular nightclub. It was in the Big Apple that Jimi Hendrix and Obermaier met and began a love affair.

In the 1970s, the Big Apple eventually became a celebrity discotheque with regulars like Uschi Glas and Dolly Dollar.

== Quotes ==
"Amylnitrates – it blew your mind. The two of us stood in the toilet cubicle in the BIG APPLE and sniffed these things until we staggered. Then it was back out onto the dance floor. Anything was fine with us to get our heads in the clouds or to get out altogether, and once I fell over pole-straight on the dance floor. But by then I was already part of the regular crowd. [...] If I wasn't at the BIG APPLE one night, I thought I had missed the run of the world or the world had forgotten me forever. I didn't miss any of the concerts."

— Uschi Obermaier on the Big Apple in High Times. My wild life.

== Literature ==
- Mirko Hecktor, Moritz von Uslar, Patti Smith, Andreas Neumeister: Mjunik Disco – from 1949 to now (in German). Blumenbar Verlag, München 2008, ISBN 978-3-936738-47-6.
