= Hans Donauer =

German Renaissance painter

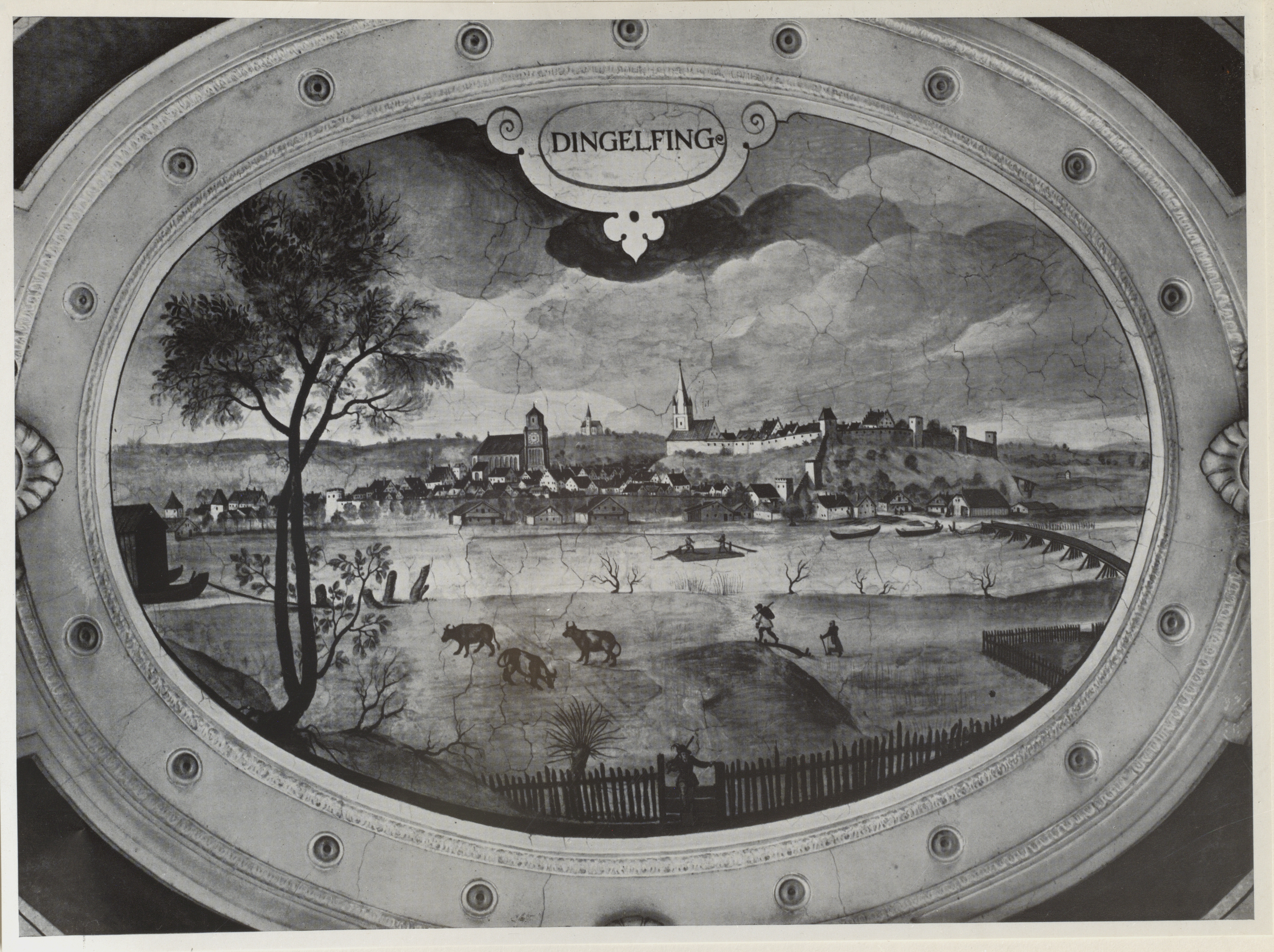
Fresco in the Antiquarium, Munich Residenz by Donauer showing the city of Dingolfing (here with old spelling Dingelfing), Bavaria. This is one of more than 100 frescos by Donauer of cities and castles in Bavaria, all in the Antiquarium.

Hans Donauer (c1521, Munich – 1596, Munich), was a German Renaissance painter. He is sometimes known as Hans Donauer the Elder. His surname is sometimes spelt "Thonauer or Thunauer.

== Biography ==
According to Karel van Mander he was the teacher of Hans Rottenhammer.

According to the RKD he was also the teacher of the painter Kaspar Amort.
