= Yellow Submarine (club) =

Nightclub in Munich, Germany

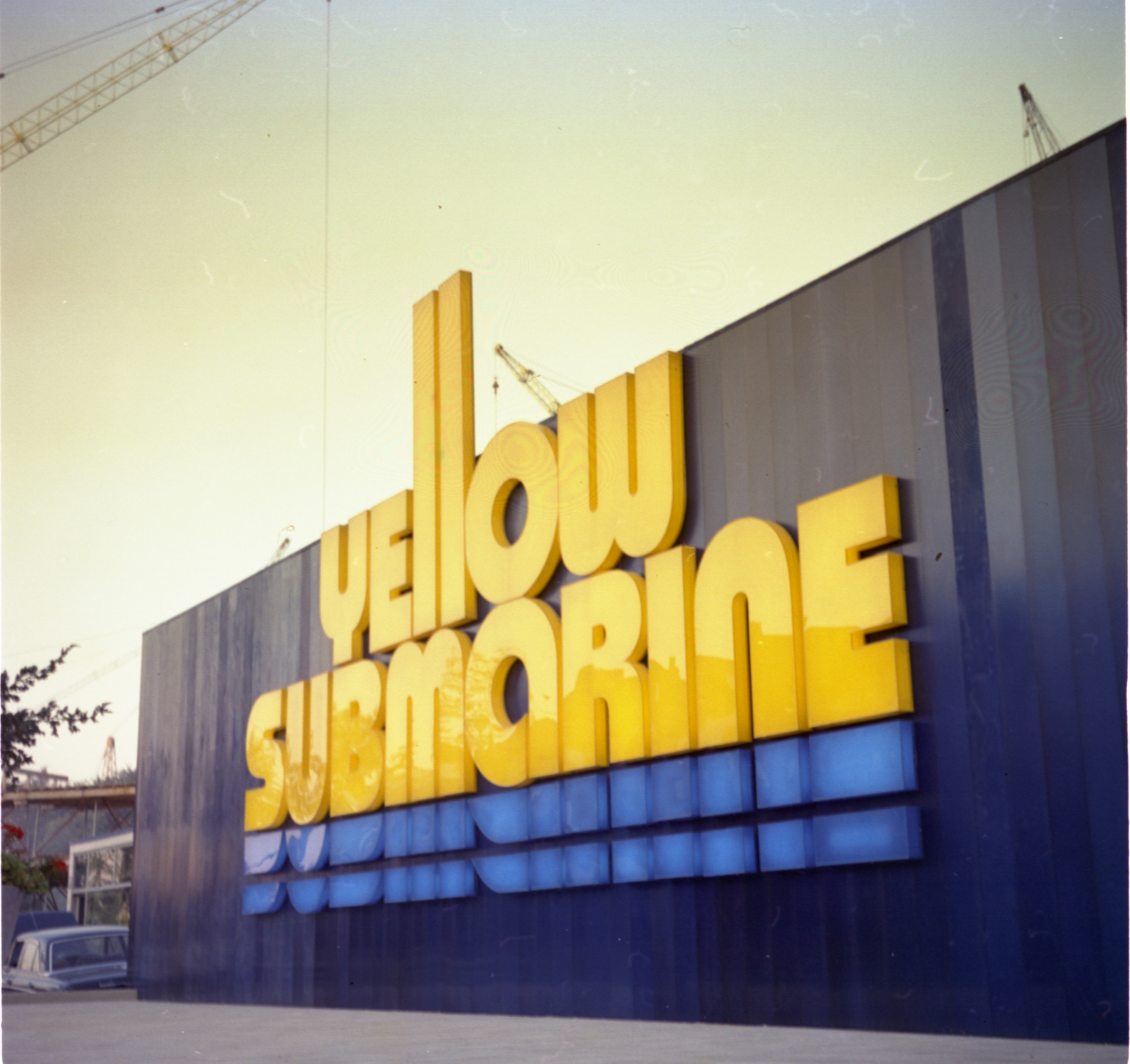
- The Yellow Submarine (1974)
- Address: Leopoldstraße 202, 80804 Munich
- Location: Schwabing, Munich, Germany
- Coordinates: 48°10′26.9″N 11°35′10.1″E
- Type: nightclub

Construction
- Opened: 1971
- Closed: 1982
- Demolished: 2013

The Yellow Submarine was a nightclub in Munich and Germany's first underwater discotheque.

== History and description ==
The Yellow Submarine, also called Haifischdisko ("Shark disco"), opened on April 2, 1971 as part of a complex that was completed in 1973 with the avant-garde Schwabylon shopping and leisure centre. The concept of the discotheque was a sensation in Europe at that time, and it became famous overnight throughout Germany. The Yellow Submarine was located south of the Schwabylon and became a bestseller for the adjoining hotel. In the first years the discotheque recorded peak sales. The name of the nightclub referred to the Beatles song from 1966.

The three-storey nightclub was surrounded by an aquarium like a diving bell, through portholes the patrons could watch 36 sharks and giant turtles that had been caught in the Gulf of Mexico and swam here in 650,000 litres (171,711 gallons) of seawater. In June 1971 the aquarium overflowed once and flooded the venue. As it was Sunday morning and the club was empty nobody was hurt, and the sharks could swim in all three floors of the discotheque. The daily feeding of the up to 1.80 meter long sea creatures cost about 500 Marks.

The interior design of the club was reminiscent of a submarine, with leather seats, iron railings and a staircase connecting three floors in an open, nine-metre high space. The entrance fee of the Yellow Submarine was 6 German marks, and the gastronomic offer included shark fin soup and grilled shark.

In later years the nightclub was renamed to Aquarius, and it closed in 1982. The building was demolished in 2013 for the construction of the Schwabinger Tor building complex, after a citizens' initiative had unsuccessfully tried to save the discotheque as a monument.

== In popular culture ==
- In episodes 77 (1974) and 93 (1975) of the ZDF crime series Der Kommissar, the Yellow Submarine served as a filming location, complete with the sharks and with 70s sound as background music.

== Exhibitions ==
- In 2018, the club was presented in pictures and words in the exhibition Night Fever at the Vitra Design Museum as the only German contribution, as a prime example of the club and pop culture that has been emerging since 1960.

== Literature ==
- Mirko Hecktor, Moritz von Uslar, Patti Smith, Andreas Neumeister: Mjunik Disco – from 1949 to now (in German). Blumenbar Verlag, München 2008, ISBN 978-3-936738-47-6.
- Karl Stankiewitz: Aus is und Gar is. Allitera Verlag, München 2018, ISBN 978-3-96233-023-1.

== Gallery ==
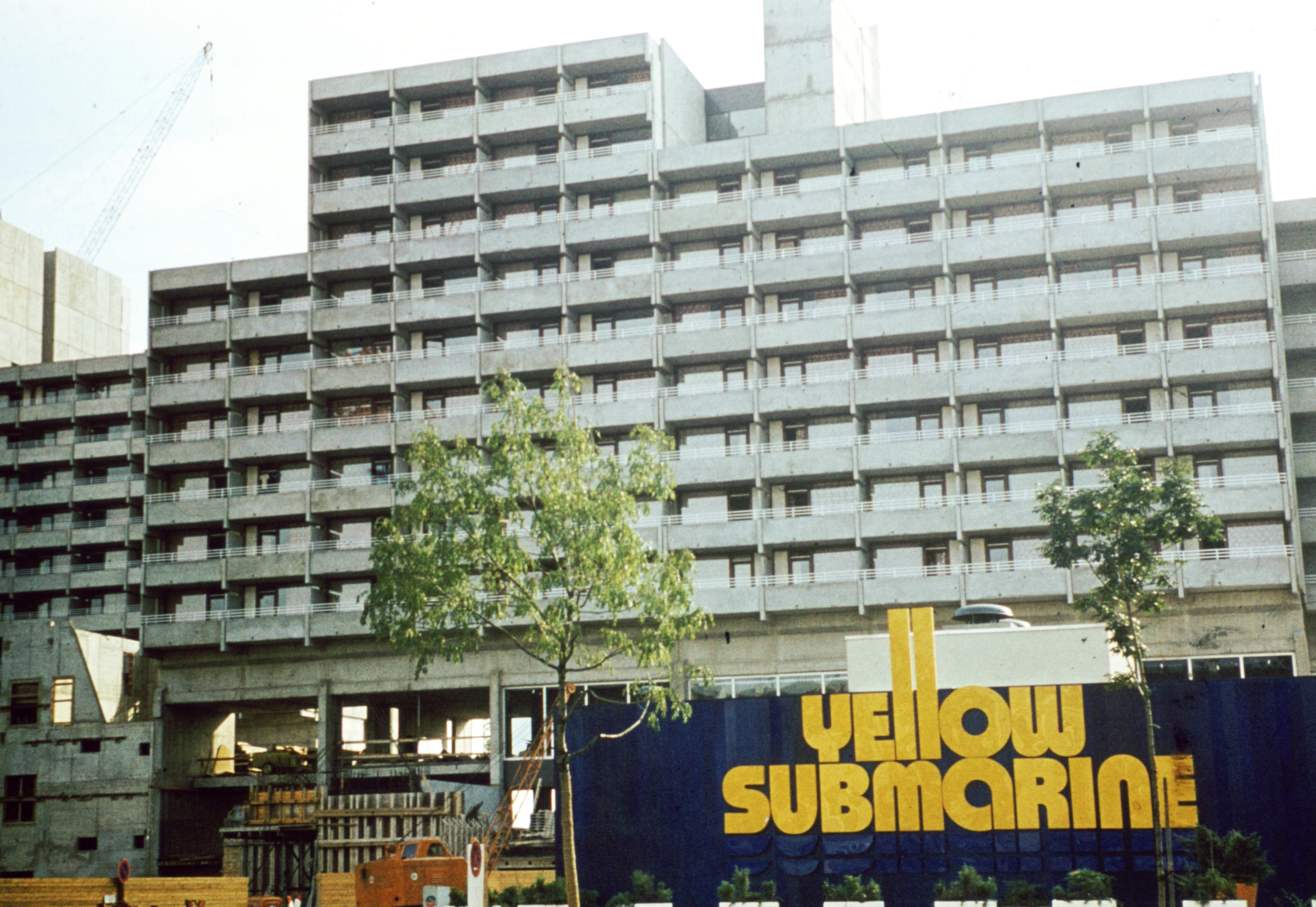
The Yellow Submarine and surrounding high-rise buildings (1972)

Footage of the Yellow Submarine and the Schwabylon (1978)
