= Schauburg (Munich) =

Theatre in Munich, Bavaria, Germany

Coordinates: 48°09′27″N 11°34′31″E

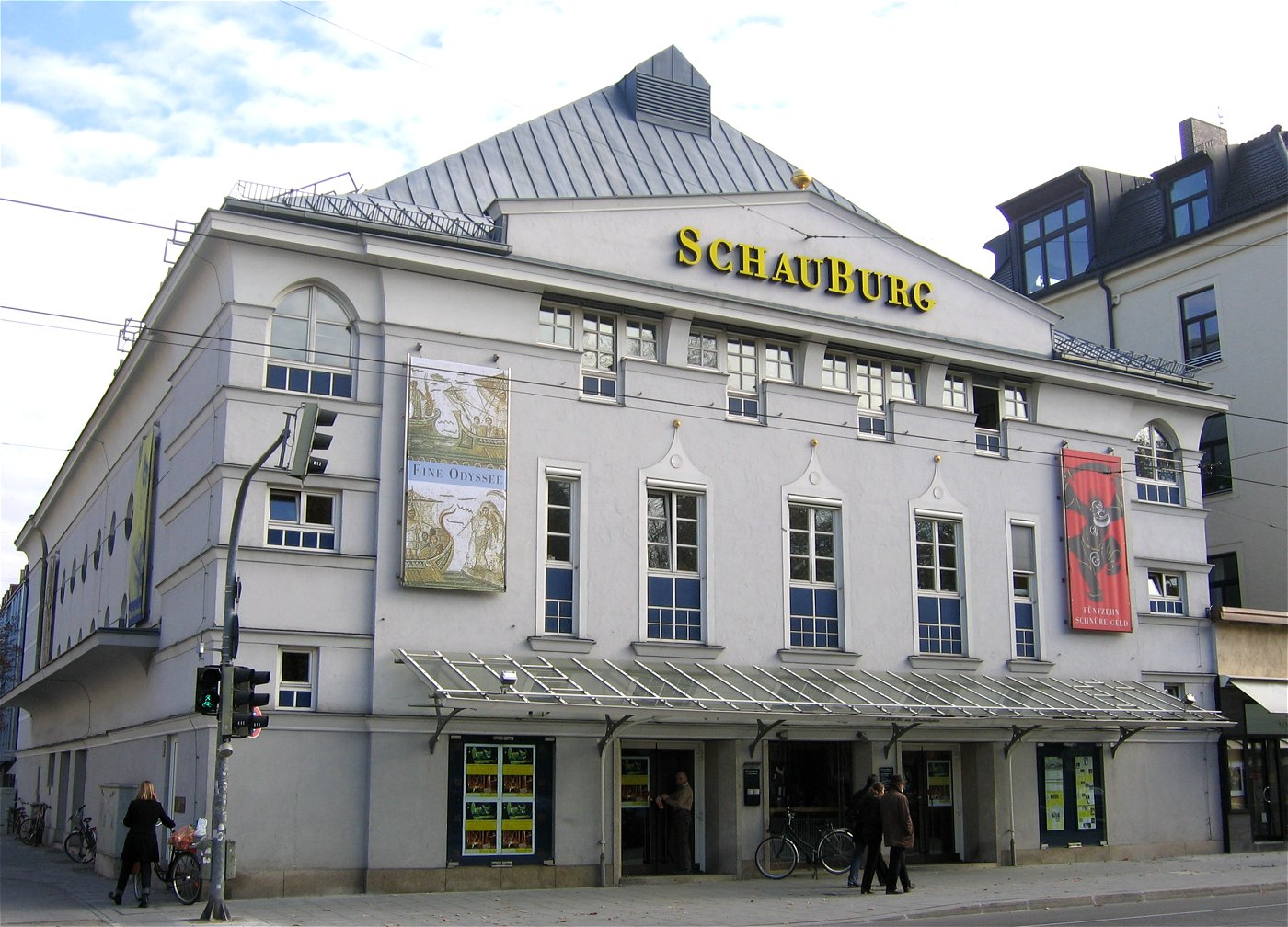
Image of Schauburg (Munich) Theatre

Schauburg is a theatre in Munich, Bavaria, Germany.

From 1967 to 1972 the internationally renowned nightclub Blow Up resided in the building, which was Germany's first large-scale disco.
