= Nightclub =

Venue for drinking, dancing and entertainment

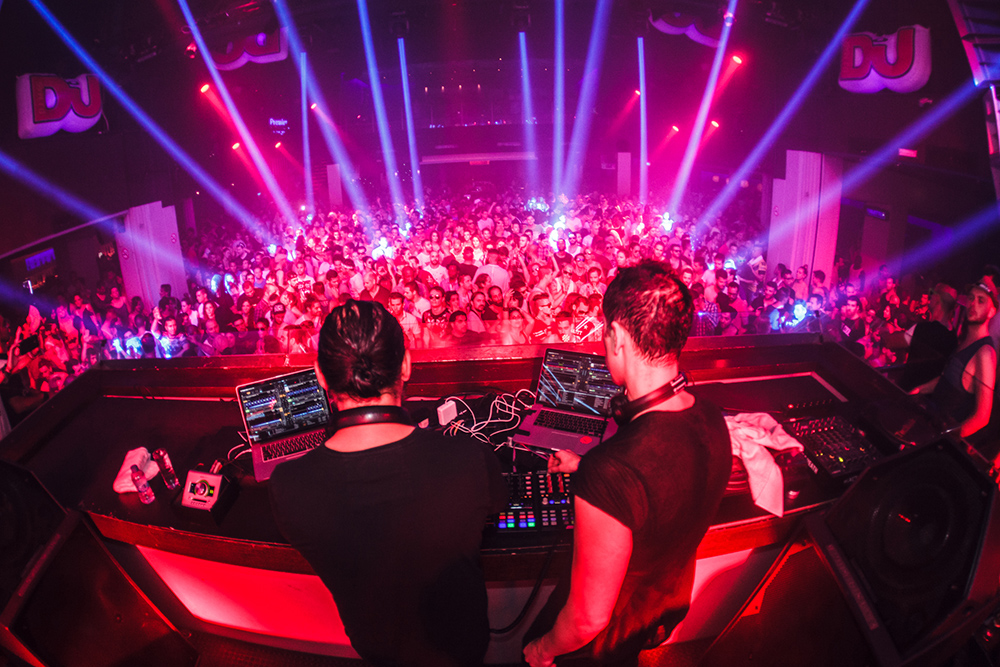
- Two DJs perform at the nightclub Space on the island of Ibiza in 2015

General information
- Genres included: Dance-pop, Electronic dance music, Rock music, Jazz music, Disco, Country Music, House Music, Rap, Hip-Hop
- Location: Worldwide
- Types of street rave dance: Hakken; Para Para; Rebolation; Melbourne Shuffle
- Related events: Music festival; Rave; metal festival; rock festival; electronic dance music festival; technoparades; acid house party; doof; trance festival; teknival; algorave; free festival; free party; circuit party; concert tour
- Related topics: Rave; Smiley; Disc jockey; VJing; Sound system; Club drugs

A nightclub or dance club is a venue that is open at night, usually for drinking, dancing and other entertainment. Nightclubs often have a bar and discotheque (usually simply known as disco) with a dance floor, laser lighting displays, and a stage for live music or a disc jockey (DJ) who mixes recorded music. Nightclubs tend to be smaller than live music venues like theatres and stadiums, with few or no seats for customers.

Nightclubs generally restrict access to people in terms of age, attire, and behaviors. Nightclubs typically have dress codes to prohibit people wearing informal, indecent, offensive, gym, or gang-related attire from entering. Unlike other entertainment venues, nightclubs are more likely to use bouncers to screen prospective patrons for entry.

The busiest nights for a nightclub are Friday and Saturday nights. Most nightclubs cater to a particular music genre or sound for branding effects. Some nightclubs may offer food and beverages (including alcoholic beverages).

== Terminology ==
In some countries, nightclubs are also referred to as "discos" or "discothèques" (German: Disko or Diskothek, outdated; nowadays: Club); French: discothèque; Italian, Portuguese, and Spanish: discoteca, antro (common in Mexico), and boliche (common in Argentina, Uruguay, and Paraguay), discos is commonly used in all others in Latin America). In Japanese ディスコ, disuko refers to an older, smaller, less fashionable venue; while クラブ, kurabu refers to a more recent, larger, more popular venue. The term night is used to refer to an evening focusing on a specific genre, such as "retro music night" or a "singles night". In Hong Kong and China, nightclub is used as a euphemism for a hostess club, and the association of the term with the sex trade has driven out the regular usage of the term.

== History ==
=== Early history ===
In the United States, New York increasingly became the national capital for tourism and entertainment. Grand hotels were built for upscale visitors. New York's theater district gradually moved northward during this half century, from The Bowery up Broadway through Union Square and Madison Square, settling around Times Square at the end of the 19th century. Stars such as Edwin Booth and Lillian Russell were among the early Broadway performers. Prostitutes served a wide variety of clientele, from sailors on leave to playboys.

The first nightclubs appeared in New York City in the 1840s and 1850s, including McGlory's, and the Haymarket. They enjoyed a national reputation for vaudeville, live music, and dance. They tolerated unlicensed liquor, commercial sex, and gambling cards, chiefly Faro. Practically all gambling was illegal in the city (except upscale horseracing tracks), and regular payoffs to political and police leadership was necessary. Prices were high and they were patronized by an upscale audience. Timothy Gilfoyle called them "the first nightclubs". By contrast, Owney Geoghegan ran the toughest nightclub in New York from 1880 to 1883. It catered to a downscale clientele and besides the usual illegal liquor, gambling, and prostitution, it featured nightly fistfights and occasional shootings, stabbings, and police raids. Webster Hall is credited as the first modern nightclub, being built in 1886 and starting off as a "social hall", originally functioning as a home for dance and political activism events. Reisenweber's Cafe is credited for introducing jazz and cabaret to New Yorkers.

=== Jukebox and prohibition ===
The jukebox (a coin-operated record-player) was invented by the Pacific Phonograph Company in 1889 by its managers Louis Glass and his partner William S. Arnold. The first was installed at the Palais Royale Saloon, San Francisco on November 23, 1889, becoming an overnight sensation.

The advent of the jukebox fueled the Prohibition-era boom in underground illegal speakeasy bars, which needed music but could not afford a live band and needed precious space for paying customers. Webster Hall stayed open, with rumors circulating of Al Capone's involvement and police bribery.

From about 1900 to 1920, working class Americans would gather at honky tonks or juke joints to dance to music played on a piano or a jukebox. With the repeal of Prohibition in February 1933, nightclubs were revived, such as New York's 21 Club, Copacabana, El Morocco, and the Stork Club. These nightclubs featured big bands.

During America's Prohibition, new speakeasies and nightclubs appeared on a weekly basis. Texas Guinan opened and ran many, and had many padlocked by the police. Harlem had its own clubs including the Cotton Club. Midtown New York had a string of nightclubs, many named after bandleaders such as Paul Whiteman, Vincent Lopez, and Roger Wolfe Kahn who opened Le Perroquet de Paris at a cost of $250,000. It was billed as America's most beautiful and sophisticated nightclub and featured the young Kahn and his band most evenings.

=== Pre-WWII ===
==== Europe ====
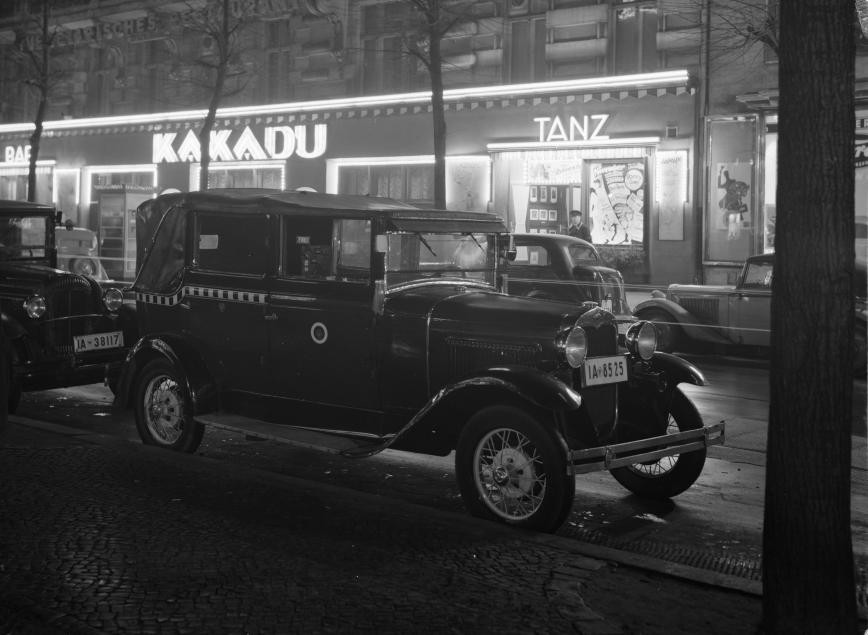
The "Kakadu" (1919–1937), a Pre-World War II nightclub in Berlin, offered a bar, a dance floor, live music played by jazz band, and cabaret.

Pre-World War II Soho in London offered café society, cabaret, burlesque jazz, and bohemian clubs similar to those in New York, Paris, and Berlin. Nightclubs in London were tied much to the idea of "high society", via organisations such as the Kit Kat Club (which took its name from the political Kit-Cat Club in Pall Mall, London) and the Café de Paris. The 43 Club on Gerrard Street was run by Kate Meyrick the 'Night Club Queen'. Meyrick ran several London nightclubs in the 1920s and early 1930s, during which time she served prison sentences for breaching licensing laws and bribing a police officer. In this era, nightclubbing was generally the preserve of those with money.

In Paris, Josephine Baker ran several nightclubs during the 1920s including Chez Josephine, as did her friend Bricktop who ran Bricktops. Jazz singer and Broadway star Adelaide Hall and her husband Bert Hicks opened the nightclub La Grosse Pomme on Rue Pigalle in Montmartre on December 9, 1937. Hall and Hicks also owned the chic Florida Club in London's Mayfair.

In Germany during the Golden Twenties, there was a need to dance away the memories of the First World War. In Berlin, where a "tango fever" had already swept dancing establishments in the early 1910s, 899 venues with a dancing licence were registered by 1930, including the Moka Efti, Casanova, Scala, Delphi-Palast (destroyed in WW2, replaced by the Delphi Filmpalast), Kakadu, Femina-Palast, Palais am Zoo, Gourmenia-Palast, Uhlandeck, and the Haus Vaterland. In the 1920s, the nightlife of the city was dominated by party drugs such as cocaine. Hundreds of venues in the city, which at the time had a sinful reputation, offered in addition to bars, stages, and dance floors an erotic nightlife, such as small booths where lovers could withdraw to for intimate moments. These venues were aimed at rich and poor people, gays, lesbians, nudists, and gangsters alike.

==== Asia ====
In 1930s Shanghai, the big clubs were The Paramount Club (opened in 1933) and Ciro's (opened in 1936). Other clubs of the era were the Metropole and the Canidrome. Jazz bands, big bands, and singers performed for a bowtied clientele. The Paramount and Ciro's in particular were fiercely rivalrous and attracted many customers from the underworld. Shanghai's clubs fell into decline after the Japanese invasion of 1937 and eventually closed. The Paramount reopened after the communist victory in 1949 as The Red Capitol Cinema, dedicated to Maoist propaganda films, before fading into obscurity. It reopened as The Paramount in 2008.

=== World War II years ===
In occupied France, jazz and bebop music, and the jitterbug dance were banned by the Nazis as "decadent American influences", so as an act of resistance, people met at hidden basements called discothèques where they danced to jazz and swing music, played on a single turntable when a jukebox was not available. These discothèques were also patronized by anti-Vichy youth called zazous. In Nazi Germany, there were underground discothèques patronized by anti-Nazi youth called the "Swing Kids".

=== Post-WWII: Emergence of the disc jockey and discothèque ===
The end of World War II saw the beginning of a transformation in the nightclub: no longer the preserve of a moneyed elite, over several decades, the nightclub steadily became a mass phenomenon.

In Germany, the first discothèque on record that involved a disc jockey was Scotch-Club, which opened in 1959. Its, and therefore the world's first DJ was 19-year-old local cub reporter Klaus Quirini who had been sent to write a story about the strange new phenomenon of public record-playing; fueled by whisky, he jumped on stage and started announcing records as he played them and took the stage-name DJ Heinrich.

In the US, Connie's Inn and the Cotton Club in Harlem, NY were popular venues for white audiences. Before 1953 and some years thereafter, most bars and nightclubs used a jukebox or mostly live bands.

In Paris, at a club named Le Whisky à Gogo, founded in 1947 on the rue de Seine by Paul Pacine, Régine Zylberberg in 1953 laid down a dance floor, suspended coloured lights, and replaced the jukebox with two turntables that she operated herself so there would be no breaks between the music. This was the world's first-ever "discothèque". The Whisky à Gogo set into place the standard elements of the modern post-World War II discothèque-style nightclub.

In London, by the end of the 1950s, several of the coffee bars in London's Soho introduced afternoon dancing. These prototype discothèques were nothing like modern-day nightclubs, as they were unlicensed, daytime venues where coffee was the drink of choice and that catered to a very young public – mostly made up of French and Italians working illegally, mostly in catering, to learn English, as well as au pair girls from most of western Europe.

A well known venue was Les Enfants Terribles at 93 Dean St., in Soho, London. Initially opening as a coffee-bar, it was run by Betty Passes who claimed to be the inventor of disco after she pioneered the idea of dancing to records at her premises' basement in 1957. It stayed popular into the 1960s. It later became a 1940s-themed club called the Black Gardenia but has since closed.

The Flamingo Club on Wardour Street in London ran between 1952 and 1967 and was known for its role in the growth of rhythm and blues and jazz in the UK. It earned a controversial reputation with gangsters and prostitutes said to have been frequent visitors in the 1960s, along with musicians such as the Beatles.

=== 1960s ===
Discothèques began to appear in New York City in 1964: the Village Vanguard offered dancing between jazz sets; Shepheard's, located in the basement of the Drake Hotel, was small but popular; L'Interdit and Il Mio (at Delmonico's) were private; the El Morocco had an on-premises disco called Garrison; and the Stork Club had one in its Shermaine suite. Larger discos opened in 1966: Cheetah, with room for 2000 dancers, the Electric Circus, and Dom.

While the discothèque swept Europe throughout the 1960s, it did not become widely popular in the United States until the 1970s, where the first rock and roll generation preferred rough and tumble bars and taverns to nightclubs until the disco era. In the early 1960s, Mark Birley opened a members-only discothèque nightclub, Annabel's, in Berkeley Square, London. In 1962, the Peppermint Lounge in New York City became popular and is the place where go-go dancing originated. Sybil Burton opened the Arthur discothèque in 1965 on East 54th Street in Manhattan on the site of the old El Morocco nightclub and it became the first, foremost, and hottest disco in New York City through 1969.

In Germany in the 1960s, when Berlin was divided by the Wall, Munich became Germany's epicenter of nightlife for the next two decades with numerous nightclubs and discothèques such as Big Apple, PN hit-house, Tiffany, Domicile, Hot Club, Piper Club, Why Not, Crash, Sugar Shack, the underwater discothèque Yellow Submarine, and Mrs. Henderson, where stars such as Mick Jagger, Keith Richards, Freddie Mercury, and David Bowie went in and out and which led to artists such as Giorgio Moroder, Donna Summer, and Mercury settling in the city. In 1967, Germany's first large-scale discothèque opened in Munich as the club Blow Up, which because of its extravagance and excesses quickly gained international reputation.

In parallel, the hippie movement spawned Britain's first club for psychedelic music, the UFO Club (at the Blarney Club, 31 Tottenham Court Road, London from 23 Dec 1966 to Oct 1967) which then became the Middle Earth club (at 43 King Street) and eventually the Roundhouse in 1968. Both the UFO Club and Middle Earth were short-lived but saw performances by artists such as house-band Pink Floyd, Soft Machine, Procol Harum, Fairport Convention, Arthur Brown, and Jimi Hendrix; DJ John Peel was a regular. These clubs germinated what would later become the underground gig scene of the 1970s and 1980s, at venues such as the 100 Club and The Clarendon in Hammersmith. During the 1960s, the Clarendon was a country & western club, having earlier been an upmarket jazz, dining, and dancing club in the pre-War era.

In the north of England, the distinct northern soul movement spanned Manchester's Twisted Wheel Club, the Blackpool Mecca, Cleethorpes Pier, and the Wigan Casino, known for the acrobatic dancing of its clubgoers; each of these clubs was known for all-nighters.

=== 1970s: Disco ===
Disco has its roots in the underground club scene. During the early 1970s in New York City, disco clubs were places where oppressed or marginalized groups such as gay people, African Americans, Latinos, Italian Americans, and Jews could party without following male to female dance protocol or exclusive club policies. Discothèques had a law where for every three men, there was one woman. The women often sought these experiences to seek safety in a venue that embraced the independent woman – with an eye to one or more of the same or opposite sex or none. Although the culture that surrounded disco was progressive in dance couples, cross-genre music, and a push to put the physical over the rational, the role of women looked to be placed in the role of safety net. It brought together people from different backgrounds. These clubs acted as safe havens for homosexual partygoers to dance in peace and away from public scrutiny.

By the late 1970s, many major U.S. cities had thriving disco club scenes centered on discothèques, nightclubs, and private loft parties where DJs would play disco hits through powerful PA systems for the dancers. The DJs played "a smooth mix of long single records to keep people 'dancing all night long'". Some of the most prestigious clubs had elaborate lighting systems that throbbed to the beat of the music.

The genre of disco has changed through the years. It is classified both as a musical genre and as a nightclub; and in the late seventies, disco began to act as a safe haven for social outcasts. This club culture that originated in downtown New York, was attended by a variety of different ethnicities and economic backgrounds. It was an inexpensive activity to indulge in, and discos united a multitude of different minorities in a way never seen before; including those in the gay and psychedelic communities. The music ultimately was what brought people together.

Some cities had disco dance instructors or dance schools that taught people how to do popular disco dances such as "touch dancing", the "hustle", and the "cha-cha-cha". There were also disco fashions that discotheque-goers wore for nights out at their local disco, such as sheer, flowing Halston dresses for women and shiny polyester Qiana shirts for men. Disco clubs and "hedonistic loft parties" had a club culture with many Italian American, African American, gay, and Hispanic people.

In addition to the dance and fashion aspects of the disco club scene, there was also a thriving drug subculture, particularly for recreational drugs that would enhance the experience of dancing to the loud music and the flashing lights, such as cocaine (nicknamed "blow"), amyl nitrite "poppers", and the "other quintessential 1970s club drug Quaalude, which suspended motor coordination and turned one's arms and legs to Jell-O". The "massive quantities of drugs ingested in discotheques by newly liberated gay men produced the next cultural phenomenon of the disco era: rampant promiscuity and public sex. While the dance floor was the central arena of seduction, actual sex usually took place in the nether regions of the disco: bathroom stalls, exit stairwells, and so on. In other cases, the disco became a kind of "main course" in a hedonist's menu for a night out."

Well known 1970s discothèques included celebrity hangouts such as Manhattan's Studio 54, which was operated by Steve Rubell and Ian Schrager. Studio 54 was notorious for the hedonism that went on within; the balconies were known for sexual encounters, and drug use was rampant. Its dance floor was decorated with an image of the "Man in the Moon" that included an animated cocaine spoon. Other 1970s discothèques in New York City were Manhattan's Starship Discovery One at 350 West 42nd Street, Roseland Ballroom, Xenon, The Loft, the Paradise Garage, a recently renovated Copacabana, and Aux Puces, one of the first gay disco bars. The album cover of Saturday Night Band's Come On and Dance, Dance featured two dancers in the Starship Discovery One. In San Francisco, there was the Trocadero Transfer, the I-Beam, and the End Up.

In Spain during the 1970s, the first clubs and discos opened in Ibiza, an island which had been a popular destination for hippie travelers since the 1960s and now was experiencing a tourist boom. The first ever "Superclub" in Ibiza was the now-abandoned "Festival Club" at Sant Josep de sa Talaia, which was built between 1969 and 1972 and serviced tourists who were bused in until it closed in 1974. Responding to this influx of visitors, locals opened the first large clubs Pacha, Amnesia, and the Ku-club (renamed Privilege in 1995).

By the early 1980s, the term "disco" had largely fallen out of favour in the United States.

=== 1970s: Disco, hip hop, punk rock, and glam foundations ===
Nightclub culture was often pioneered by African American and Latino communities in the United States. In the 1970s and 80s, Black DJs created the blueprint for the modern dance floor. Chicago house, born in venues like The Warehouse with Frankie Knuckles, and Detroit techno, pioneered by the "Belleville Three" (Juan Atkins, Kevin Saunderson, and Derrick May), turned the DJ into a cultural icon and established the "non-stop beat" format used globally today.

In parallel to the disco scene and quite separate from it, the glam rock (T. Rex, David Bowie, Roxy Music) and punk rock cultures in London produced their own set of nightclubs, starting with Billy's at 69 Dean Street in Soho (known for its David Bowie nights),

Louise's on Poland Street (the first true punk club and hangout of the Sex Pistols, Siouxsie Sioux plus the Bromley Contingent, and then Blitz (the home of the Blitz Kids). Crackers was a key part of the jazz-funk scene and also the early punk scene via its Vortex nights.

The underground warehouse party scene was kicked off by Toyah Willcox with her Mayhem Studios at Patcham Terrace in Battersea. The emergence of this highly experimental artistic scene in London can be credited almost entirely to Rusty Egan, Steve Strange, the Bromley Contingent's Philip Sallon, and Chris Sullivan.

The new wave music scene grew out of Blitz and the Cha Cha Club in Charing Cross. Whilst overall, the club scene was fairly small and hidden away in basements, cellars, and warehouses, London's complicated mix of punk, New Romantic, New Wave, and gay clubs in the late 1970s and early 1980s paved the way for acid house to flourish in the late 1980s, initially with Shoom and two acid house nights at Heaven: Spectrum and Rage.

On 3 July 1980, at Gossip's on Dean Street, Soho, Gaz Mayall, son of John Mayall, began Gaz's Rockin' Blues, later at Billy's Club, now the longest running club night (one-nighter), an independent promotion event series, in London, still going as of 2021.

In the north of England, what later became the "alternative" scene was centered around the Roxy/Bowie room at Pips in Manchester, which opened in 1972; as small as this scene was, many notable figures attended the club, and Joy Division played their first gig there, billed as "Warsaw" before changing their name that night.

=== 1980s: New wave, post-punk, goth, rave, and acid house ===
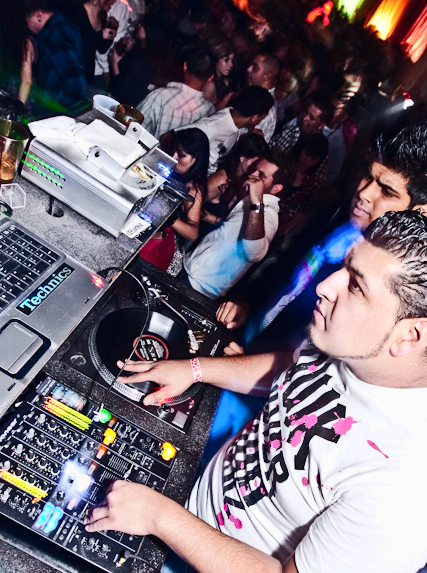
A disc jockey (DJ) mixing vinyl records on turntables (Inland Empire, 2009)

During the 1980s, during the New Romantic movement, London had a vibrant nightclub scene, which included clubs like The Blitz, the Batcave, the Camden Palace, and Club for Heroes. These clubs grew out of the earlier Mandrake and Billy's (later Gossip's) at 69 Dean Street, in the basement below the ground floor Gargoyle Club. Both music and fashion embraced the aesthetics of the movement. Bands included Depeche Mode, Yazoo, The Human League, Duran Duran, Eurythmics, and Ultravox. Reggae-influenced bands included Boy George and Culture Club, and electronic vibe bands included Visage. At London nightclubs, young men would often wear make-up and young women would wear men's suits. Leigh Bowery's Taboo (which opened in 1985) bridged the New Romantic and acid house scenes.

With the birth of house music in the mid-1980s and then acid house, kickstarted by Chris Sullivan's The Wag Club (on the site of the earlier The Flamingo Club), a cultural revolution swept around the world; first in Chicago at the Warehouse and then London and New York City. London clubs such as Clink Street, Revolution in Progress (RiP), Philip Sallon's The Mudd Club, Danny Rampling's Shoom (starting in December 1987 in the basement of Southwark's Fitness Centre), Paul Oakenfold's Spectrum, and Nicky Holloway's The Trip fused the eclecticism and ethos of [Ibiza with the new electronic music from the US.

The largest UK cities like Birmingham, Leeds (The Orbit), Liverpool (Quadrant Park and 051), Manchester (The Haçienda), Newcastle, and Swansea, and several key European places like Paris (Les Bains-Douches), Ibiza (Pacha), and Rimini, also played a significant role in the evolution of clubbing, DJ culture, and nightlife.

Significant New York nightclubs of the period were Area, Danceteria, and The Limelight.

However, the seismic shift in nightlife was the emergence of rave culture in the UK. A mixture of free and commercial outdoor parties were held in fields, warehouses, and abandoned buildings, by various groups such as Biology, Sunrise, Confusion, Hedonism, Rage & Energy, and many others. This laid the ground for what was unfold in the 1990s, initially in the United Kingdom, Germany, and the United States and then worldwide from the 2000s onwards.

=== 1990s, 2000s, and 2010s ===
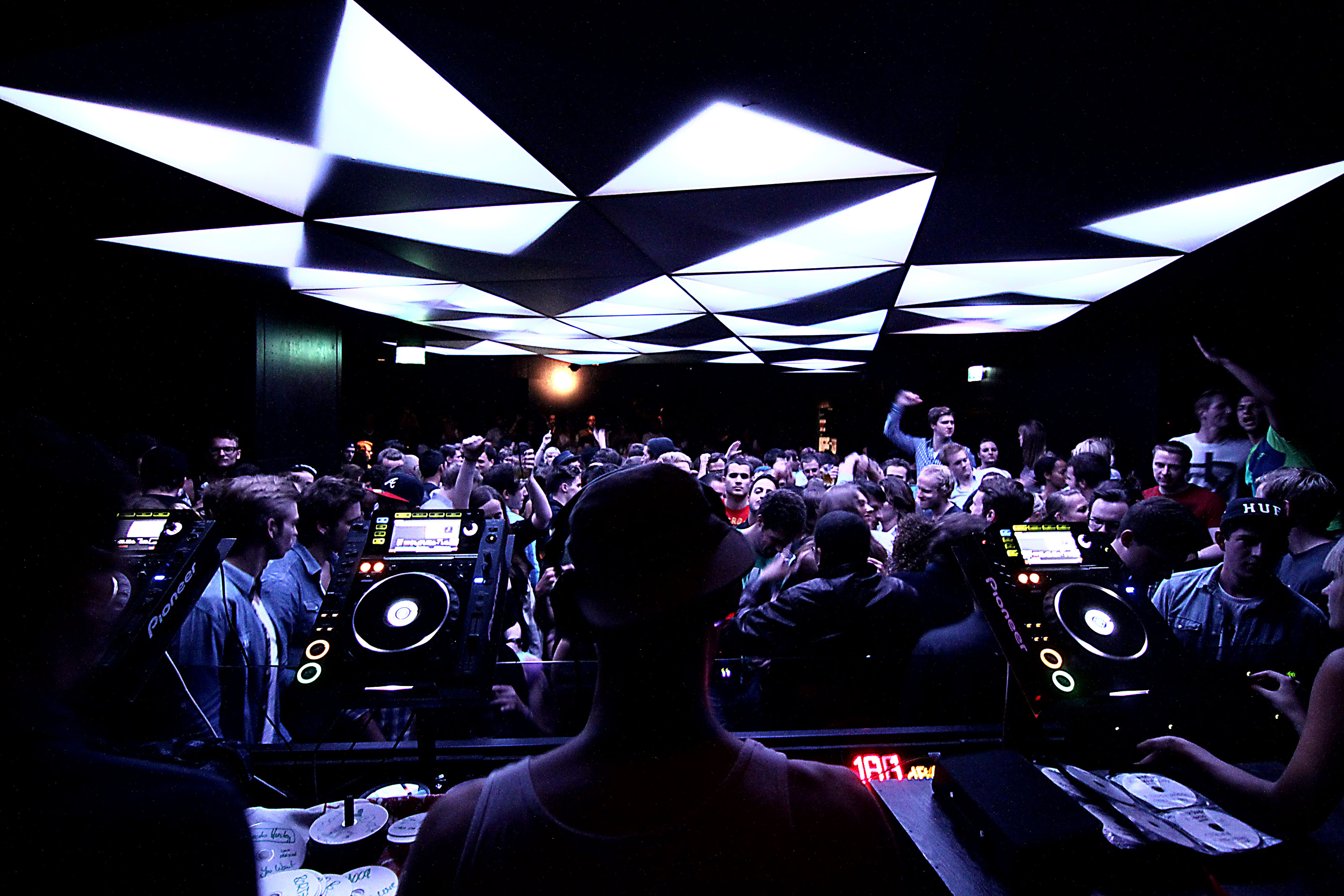
Club DJ using digital CDJ players for mixing music (Munich, 2010s)

In Europe and North America, nightclubs play disco-influenced dance music such as house music, techno, Eurodance and other dance music styles such as electronica, breakbeat, and trance. Most nightclubs in major cities in the U.S. that have an early adulthood clientele, play hip hop, dance-pop, house, and/or trance music. These clubs are generally the largest and most frequented of all of the different types of clubs.

Techno clubs are popular around the world since the early 1990s. Well known examples of the 1990s include Tresor, E-Werk, and Bunker in Berlin; Omen and Dorian Gray in Frankfurt; Ultraschall, KW – Das Heizkraftwerk, and Natraj Temple in Munich; and Stammheim in Kassel.

In 1992, the Castlemorton Common Festival triggered the UK government's Criminal Justice Act, which largely ended the rave movement by criminalizing any gathering of 20 or more people where music ("sounds wholly or predominantly characterized by the emission of a succession of repetitive beats") was played. Commercial clubs immediately capitalized on the situation causing a boom in "Superclubs" in the UK, such as Ministry of Sound (London), Renaissance, and Cream (Liverpool). These developed the club-as-spectacle theme pioneered in the 1970s and 1980s by Pacha (Ibiza) and Juliana's Tokyo (Japan), creating a global phenomenon; however, many clubs such as The Cross in London, preserved the more underground feel of the former era.

By 1995, Fatboy Slim co-founded a popular club night at the Concorde, a 300-capacity bingo hall, in Brighton, the Big Beat Boutique, where he played music from genres including northern soul, acid house, hip-hop and reggae, combined with breakbeats.

Since the late 2000s, venues that received high media attention include Berghain in Berlin and Fabric in London.

Video art has been used in nightclubs since the 1960s, but especially with the rise of electronic dance music since the late 1980s. VJing gained more and more importance. VJs ("video jockeys") mix video content in a similar manner that DJs mix audio content, creating a visual experience that is intended to complement the music.

In the mid-to-late 2010s, the musical landscape of North American nightclubs underwent a significant shift. While EDM and Dance-pop dominated the early part of the decade, by approximately 2016, hip hop and trap became the primary genres in mainstream American nightlife. This era saw the rise of "club rap," where high-energy production from artists like Drake, Future, Rae Sremmurd, Kendrick Lamar, and Migos replaced traditional house and trance in many top-tier venues. By 2018 and 2019, the "superclub" format in cities like Las Vegas, Miami, and Atlanta frequently billed hip hop artists alongside or in place of resident DJs to cater to the evolving tastes of the millennial and Gen Z demographic.

=== 2020s ===
In early 2020s, the global COVID-19 pandemic, triggered nightclubs to close worldwide – the first ever synchronized, global shutdown of nightlife. In response, online "virtual nightclubs" developed, hosted on video-conferencing platforms such as Zoom. As countries relaxed lockdown rules following drops in case numbers, some nightclubs reopened in repurposed form as sat-down pubs. As vaccine rollouts reached advanced stages, nightclubs were able to reopen with nil or looser restrictions, such as producing certification of full vaccination upon entry.

== Entry criteria ==
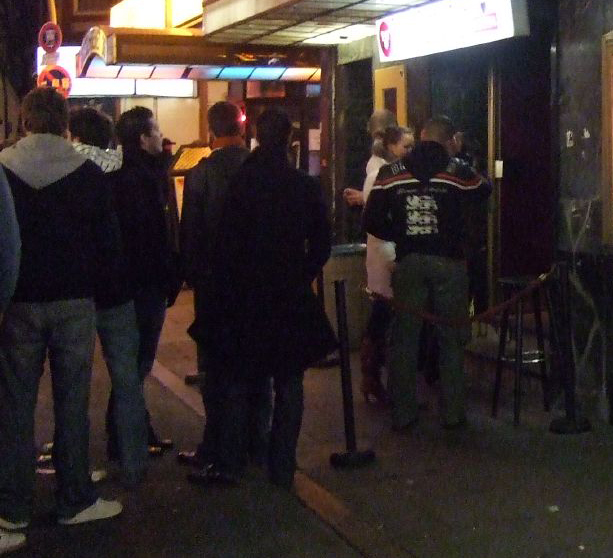
A bouncer checks patrons' IDs at the entrance to a nightclub

Many nightclubs use bouncers to choose who can enter the club, or specific lounges or VIP areas. Some nightclubs have one group of bouncers to screen clients for entry at the main door, and then other bouncers to screen for entry to other dance floors, lounges, or VIP areas. For legal reasons, in most jurisdictions, the bouncers have to check ID to ensure that prospective patrons are of legal drinking age and that they are not intoxicated already. In this respect, a nightclub's use of bouncers is no different from the use of bouncers by pubs and sports bars. However, in some nightclubs, bouncers may screen patrons using criteria other than just age and intoxication status, such as dress code, guest list inclusion, and physical appearance.

This type of screening is used by clubs to make their club "exclusive", by denying entry to people who are not dressed in a stylish enough manner. While some clubs have written dress codes, such as no ripped jeans, no jeans, no gang clothing, and so on, other clubs may not post their policies. As such, the club's bouncers may deny entry to anybody at their discretion. The guest list is typically used for private parties and events held by celebrities. At private parties, the hosts may only want their friends to attend. At celebrity events, the hosts may wish the club to only be attended by A-list individuals.

=== Cover charge ===
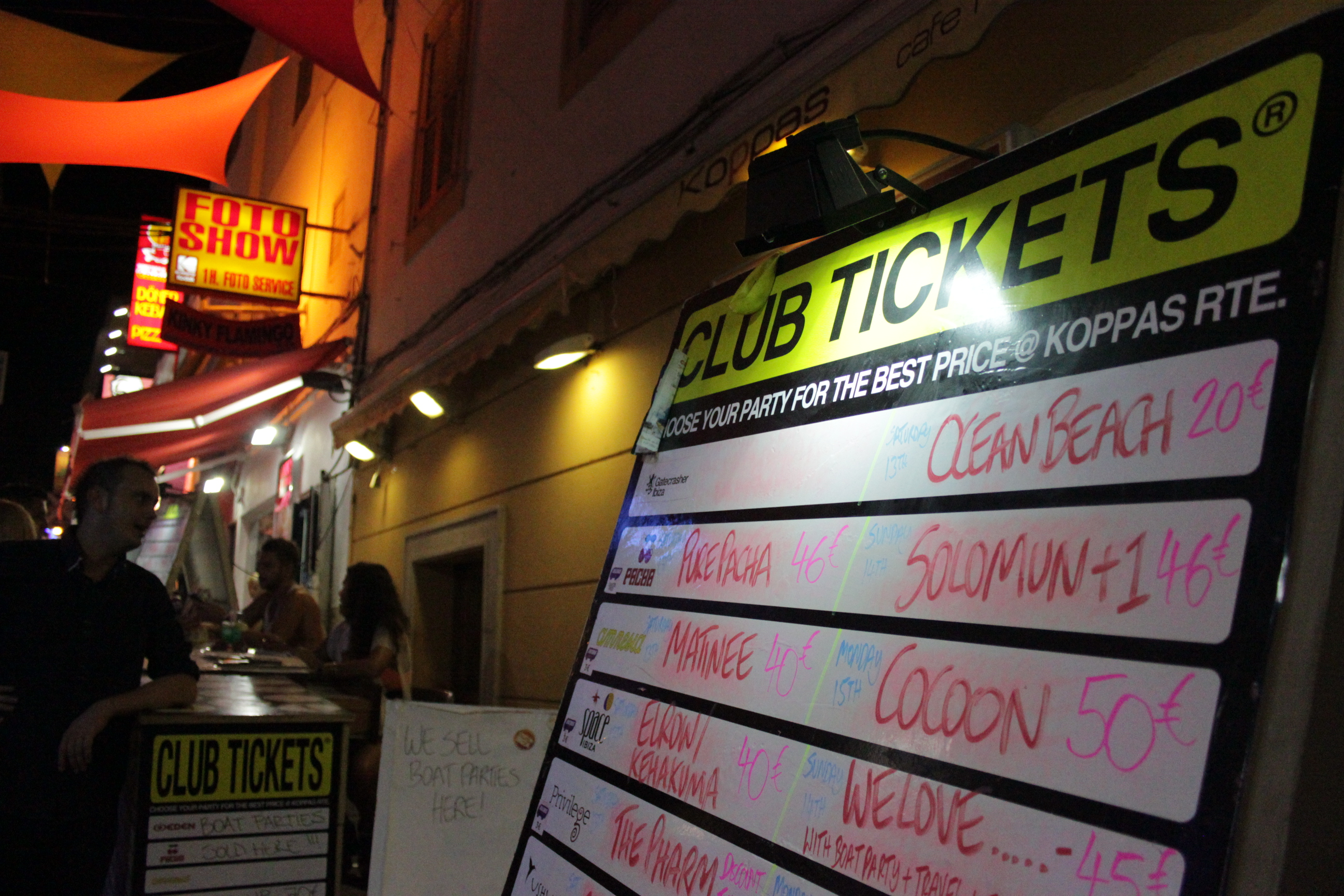
Advance ticket sales for diverse nightclubs on Ibiza island

In most cases, entering a nightclub requires a flat fee, called a cover charge. Some clubs waive or reduce the cover charge for early arrivers, special guests, or women (in the United Kingdom this latter option is illegal under the Equality Act 2010, but the law is rarely enforced, and open violations are frequent). Friends of the doorman or the club owner may gain free entrance. Sometimes, especially at larger clubs in Continental European countries, one gets only a pay card at the entrance, on which all money spent in the discothèque (often including the entrance fee) is marked. Sometimes, entrance fee and cloakroom costs are paid by cash, and only the drinks in the club are paid using a pay card.

Some clubs offer patrons the chance to sign up on their guest list. A club's guest list is a special promotion the venue offers separate from general admission. Each club has different benefits when you are signed up on their guest list. Some of the benefits of being on a club's guestlist include: free entry, discounted cover charge, the ability to skip the line, and free drinks. Many clubs hire a promotions team to find and sign up guests to the club's guest list.

=== Dress code ===
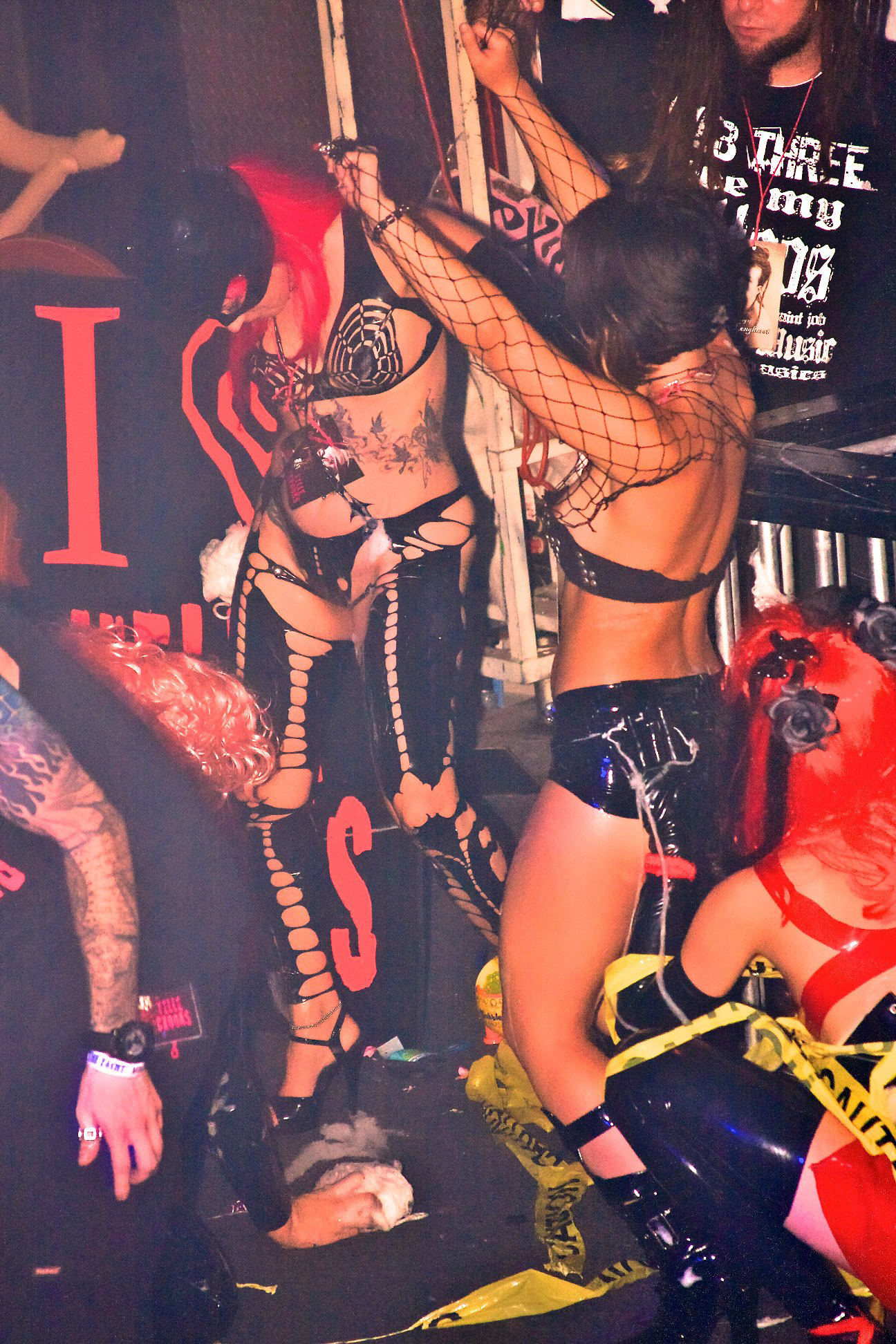
Dancers in fetish fashion at a nightclub

Many nightclubs enforce a dress code in order to ensure a certain type of clientele is in attendance at the venue. Some upscale nightclubs ban attendees from wearing trainers (sneakers) or jeans while other nightclubs will advertise a vague "dress to impress" dress code that allows the bouncers to discriminate at will against those vying for entry to the club.

Many exceptions are made to nightclub dress codes, with denied entry usually reserved for the most glaring rule breakers or those thought to be unsuitable for the party.

Rave parties typically both allow and encourage the wearing of clubwear, deliberately skimpy and outrageous clothing designed for dancing and exhibitionism.

Certain nightclubs like fetish nightclubs may apply a dress code (BDSM) to a leather-only, rubber-only, or fantasy dress code.

Dress code criteria can be an excuse for discriminatory practices, such as in the case of Carpenter v. Limelight Entertainment Ltd.

=== Exclusive nightclubs ===
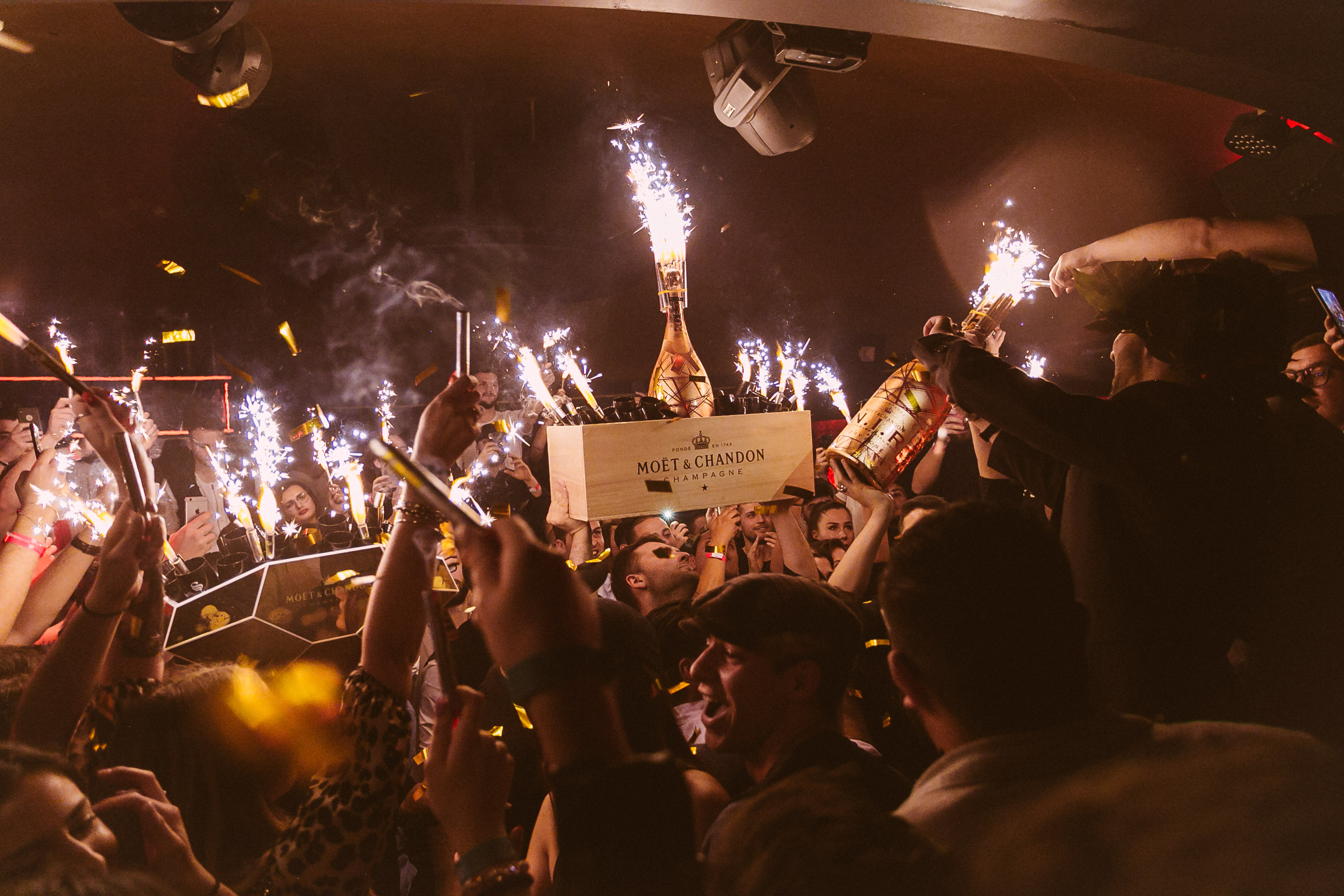
Bottle service at a nightclub

Large cosmopolitan cities that are home to large affluent populations (such as Atlanta, Chicago, Sydney, Los Angeles, Melbourne, Miami, New York City, and London) often have what are known as exclusive boutique nightclubs. This type of club typically has a capacity of less than 200 occupants and a very strict entrance policy, which usually requires an entrant to be on the club's guest list. While not explicitly members only clubs, such as Soho House, exclusive nightclubs operate with a similar level of exclusivity. As they are off limits to most of the public and ensure the privacy of guests, many celebrities favor these types of clubs to other, less exclusive, clubs that do not cater as well to their needs.

Another differentiating feature of exclusive nightclubs is that they are known for having a certain type of crowd, for instance, a fashion-forward, affluent crowd or a crowd with a high concentration of fashion models. Many exclusive boutique clubs market themselves as being a place to socialize with models and celebrities. Affluent patrons who find that marketing message appealing are often willing to purchase bottle service at a markup of several times the retail cost of the liquor.

== Substance abuse ==
A distinctive feature of a nightclub is also the fact that it can serve as a hub for substances like alcohol, which could affect third parties, creating a negative externality of consumption. The culture of nightclubs create a sense of consuming alcohol in larger quantities than usual. A study in São Paulo looking to identify causes of binge drinking found that environmental variables such as more number of dancefloors, higher level of noise, and 'all you can drink' services to be significantly linked to binge drinking. Furthermore, the culture created around nightclubs to indulge in 'pre-drinking' accentuates the amount of alcohol consumed, which leads to more problems in residential areas off nightclub premises (for example, a higher chance of participating in a fight).

Moreover, young consumers of nightclubs who tend to binge drink are often found to be less safe during sexual encounters as a result of the alcohol, which could lead to the spread of STDs.

A big issue that stems from alcohol and drug abuse in nightclubs is transportation. Private cars are the most prominent mode of transportation to and from nightclubs, and the use of drugs and alcohol in nightclubs are reported to increase the number of risky behaviors, such as driving under the influence or taking a lift from someone under the influence. A portion of driving customers, despite drinking less than non-driving customers, are still observed to have alcohol levels above the legal threshold after a night out at a nightclub.

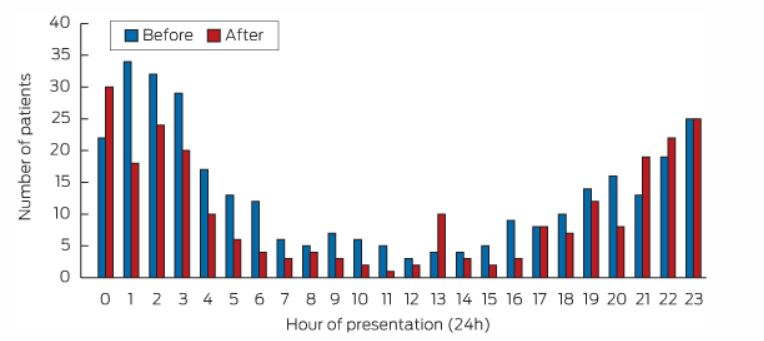
Number of patients with alcohol-related serious injury and trauma to the emergency department at different hours of the day, before and after a change in alcohol legislation that made partying stricter in the Sydney CBD Entertainment Precinct. These policies include: increased monitoring, increased strictness on entry of clubs, and sharing of information between venues to prevent intoxicated patrons to access different places. On average, there is significant decreases in any alcohol-related injury.

== Photography ==
In some nightclubs professional photographers will take publicity photos of patrons, to use in advertising for the nightclub. Digital SLR cameras and speedlight flash units are typically used. Concert photography and event photography are used to provide clubgoers with a memorable keepsake in addition to promo material used by clubs. Some nightclubs (and in particular techno clubs) pursue a strict no photo policy in order to protect the clubbing experience, and smartphone camera lenses of visitors are occasionally taped up with stickers when one enters the venue.

== Bouncer ==
Most nightclubs employ teams of bouncers, who have the power to restrict entry to the club and remove people. Upon entry, some bouncers use handheld metal detectors to prevent weapons being brought into clubs or conduct a pat down for weapons. Bouncers often eject patrons for reasons such as possession of party drugs in the venue, physical altercations with other patrons, and behavior deemed to be inappropriate or troublesome. Bouncers only allow a certain number of people into a club at a time by counting heads in order to prevent stampedes, and fire code, or liquor licensing violations. They also enforce a club's dress code upon entry. Many clubs have balcony areas specifically for the security team to watch over the clubbers.

== Floor show ==
Some nightclubs present a 'floor show', a series of acts by comedians, dancers, models, singers, and other entertainers, which can be similar to cabaret.

== Serious incidents ==
- 20 September 1929: Study Club fire, early dance club fire that killed 22 in Detroit, Michigan, US
- 23 April 1940: Rhythm Club fire, 209 killed at nightclub fire at Natchez, Mississippi, US
- 28 November 1942: Cocoanut Grove fire, 492 killed in a nightclub fire at Boston, Massachusetts, US
- 1 November 1970: Club Cinq-Sept fire in a nightclub just outside the small town of Saint-Laurent-du-Pont, Isère in south-eastern France; 146 people killed
- 8 March 1973: Whiskey Au Go Go fire, 15 killed after firebombing at Fortitude Valley, Brisbane, Australia
- 2 August 1973: Summerland disaster, 51 killed at fire at Summerland leisure centre at Douglas, Isle of Man
- 28 May 1977: Beverly Hills Supper Club fire, 165 killed and 200 injured in nightclub fire at Southgate, Kentucky, US
- 14 February 1981: Stardust fire disaster, 48 killed and 214 injured at nightclub fire at Dublin, Republic of Ireland
- 17 December 1983: Alcalá 20 nightclub fire, 82 people were killed and 27 injured in Madrid, Spain
- 25 March 1990: Happy Land fire, 87 killed in a nightclub fire at Happy Land, The Bronx, New York City
- 20 December 1993: Kheyvis fire, 17 killed in a nightclub fire at Buenos Aires, Argentina
- 27 November 1994: Yiyuan Disco fire, 233 killed in a nightclub fire at Fuxin, China
- 18 March 1996: Ozone Disco fire, 162 dead and 95 injured at a nightclub in Quezon City, Philippines
- 30 October 1998: Gothenburg discothèque fire, 63 people killed, 214 injured in a nightclub fire at Gothenburg, Sweden
- 1 June 2001: Suicide bombing at the Dolphinarium discothèque in Tel Aviv, Israel
- 12 October 2002: 2002 Bali bombings, 202 killed by large bombs
- 7 December 2002: Cowgate fire, Edinburgh, Scotland
- 17 February 2003: E2 nightclub stampede, Chicago, Illinois, 21 killed and over 50 injured
- 20 February 2003: The Station nightclub fire, 100 killed at nightclub fire in West Warwick, Rhode Island
- 30 December 2004: República Cromañón nightclub fire, 194 killed and 714 injured in a nightclub fire at Buenos Aires, Argentina
- 18 June 2007: Gatecrasher One Fire, Sheffield, England
- 1 January 2009: Santika Club fire in Santika Club in Watthana, Bangkok, Thailand, 61 killed and at least 212 injured
- 5 December 2009: Lame Horse fire, a fire at the Lame Horse nightclub killed at least 155 people and injures 79 others in Perm, Russia.
- 27 January 2013: Kiss nightclub fire, 242 died in stampede in Brazil
- 30 October 2015: Colectiv nightclub fire, 55 killed and 180 injured in Romania
- 12 June 2016: 49 people killed in a mass shooting at the Pulse nightclub in Orlando, Florida
- 1 January 2017: At least 35 people killed in an attack on the Reina nightclub in Istanbul, Turkey
- 8 April 2025: 231 people killed in a roof collapse at the Jet Set nightclub in Santo Domingo, Dominican Republic

== See also ==
- Dance hall
- Dance music
- Dance party
- Go-go dancing
- Nightclub act
- Rave
- Outline of entertainment
