= The Wag Club =

Nightclub in the English city of London

The Wag Club was a nightclub in the English city of London created during the early 1980s, which played a key role in shaping 1980s UK club and rave culture. The club became associated with the London nightlife scene during the post-punk and New Romantic eras.
