= Kaspar Amort =

German painter

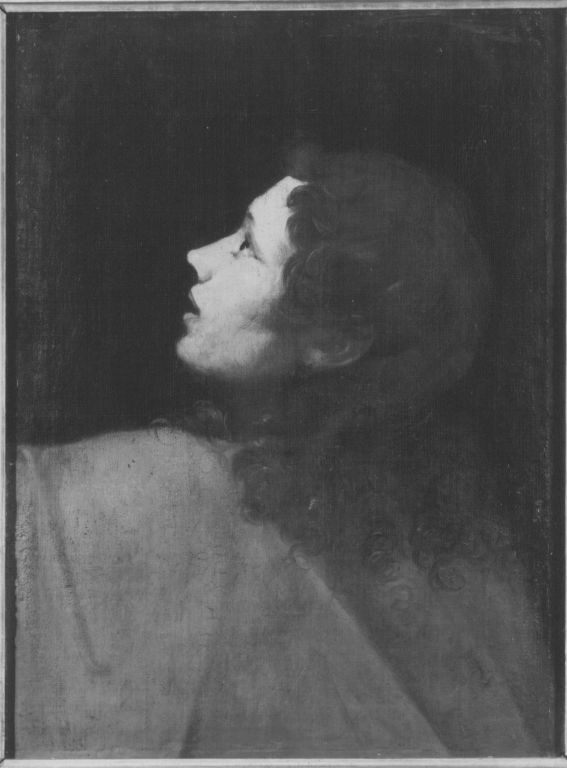
Johannes Study

Kaspar Amort (1612 – 7 March 1675) was a German painter, active in Munich. He is sometimes known as Kaspar Amort the Elder, to distinguish him from his son Kaspar Amort the Younger (born c. 1640).

== Life ==
Amort was born in 1612 in the valley of the Jachenau. He went to Munich in 1631, where he studied art under Johann Donauer. He then paid a visit to Italy, where the works of Caravaggio had a great impact on his style.

In 1642, following his return to Munich he was made court painter, and executed numerous works for the Residenz and for churches and monastic buildings, including an altarpiece (c.1655), showing the martyrdom of St Ursula and her companions, for the parish church of St Sylvester in Schwabing.

He died at Munich on 7 March 1675.

== Family ==
Amort had four sons and five daughters. Two of his sons were artists: Kaspar (by whom no major works are known) and Lukas.

== Sources ==
- Baumann-Oelwein, Cornelia (2000). Der Orlandoblock am Münchner Platzl: Geschichte eines Baudenkmals (in German). Oldenburg Verlag. p. 38. ISBN 9783486565072.

Attribution:
