= Schwabing =

Borough in the northern part of Munich, Germany

Coordinates: 48°10′02″N 11°35′10″E

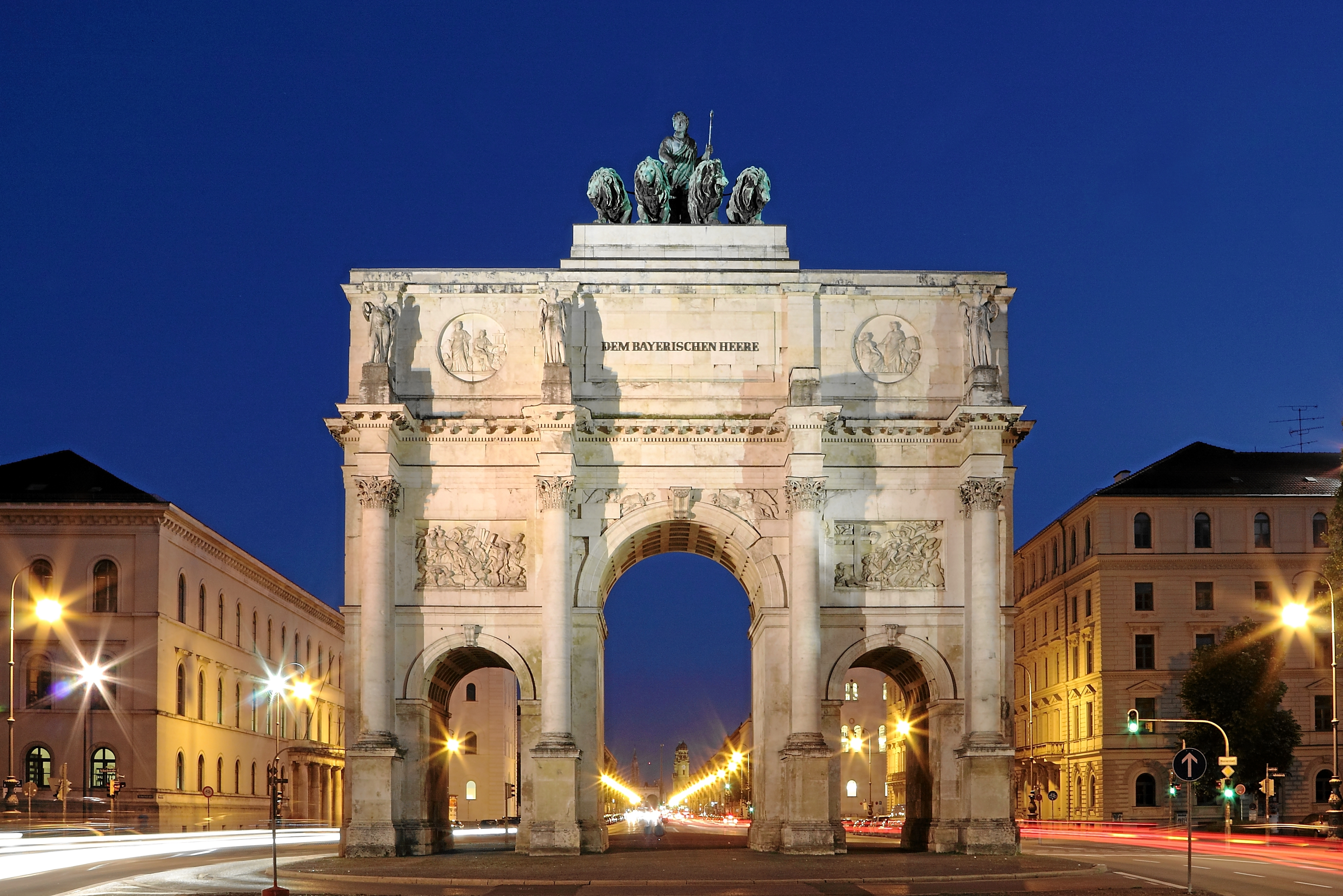
The Siegestor (front), on Leopoldstraße between Munich's Maxvorstadt and Schwabing

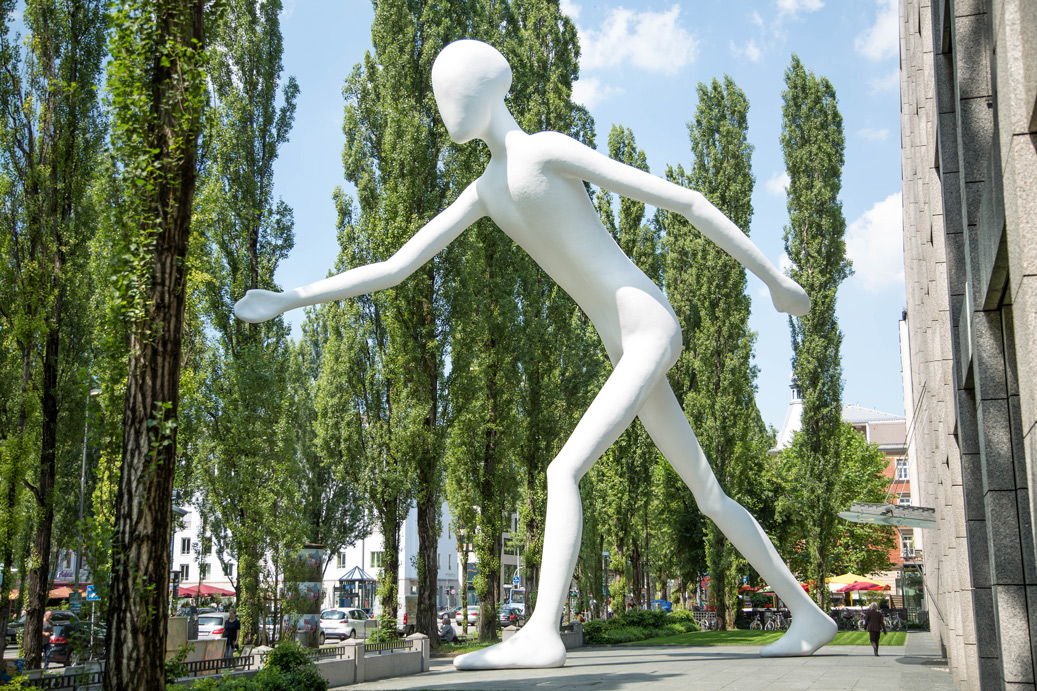
Walking Man at Leopoldstraße

Schwabing (German pronunciation: [ˈʃvaːbɪŋ]) is a borough in the northern part of Munich, the capital of the German state of Bavaria. It is part of the city borough 4 (Schwabing-West) and the city borough 12 (Schwabing-Freimann). The population of Schwabing is estimated at 100,000, making it one of the largest districts of Munich. The main boulevard is Leopoldstraße.

== Overview ==
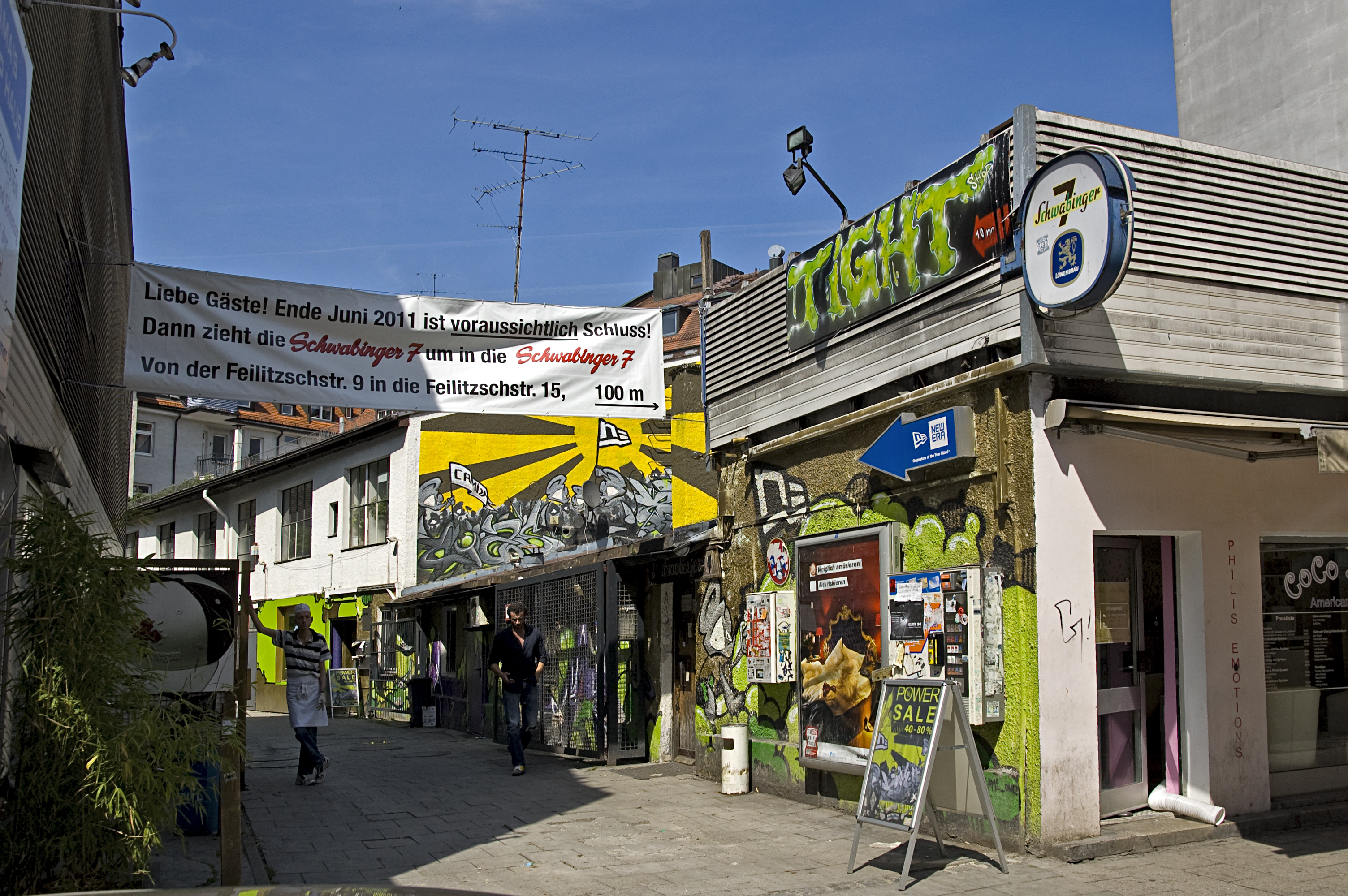
2011 before the demolition of the Schwabinger 7 bar and redevelopment of the area shown in the photograph

Schwabing was a village, with a church documented in the 14th century.

Schwabing used to be famous as Munich's bohemian quarter, but has lost much of this reputation due to strong gentrification in the last decades. A popular location is the Englischer Garten, or English Garden, one of the world's largest public parks. Other not so commonly known parks in Schwabing are Leopoldpark, Petuelpark and Biotop am Ackermannbogen.

The main buildings of Munich's largest universities, LMU Munich and the Technical University of Munich and Academy of Fine Arts are situated in the nearby Maxvorstadt. A student housing area called "Studentenstadt" (literally, "student city") is located in the north of Schwabing.

The gentrification of Schwabing and various construction projects led to various protests around the year 2011. The Schwabinger Tor urban redevelopment includes more than 200 apartments, 50 offices, a 5-star hotel, and restaurants.

== Culture ==
Schwabing in the 1970s: The Yellow Submarine discotheque and the futuristic Schwabylon shopping center

=== Bohemia since 1890 ===
Schwabing became very famous especially during the reign of Prince Regent Luitpold when numerous artists like Ludwig Ganghofer, Heinrich Mann, Thomas Mann, Oskar Panizza, Otto Julius Bierbaum, Frank Wedekind, Ernst von Wolzogen, Gustav Meyrink, Rainer Maria Rilke, Isolde Kurz, Ludwig Thoma, Max Halbe, Annette Kolb, Stefan George, Karl Wolfskehl, Ludwig Klages, Roda Roda, Christian Morgenstern, Max Dauthendey, Mechtilde Lichnowsky, Lion Feuchtwanger, Leonhard Frank, Joachim Ringelnatz, Claire Goll, Oskar Maria Graf, Hugo Ball, Hermann Kesten, Thomas Theodor Heine, Olaf Gulbransson, Bruno Paul, Eduard Thöny and Rudolf Wilke lived or worked there. Lenin was a resident of Schwabing for some years, as was noted psychoanalyst and bohemian Otto Gross. The Countess Fanny zu Reventlow was known as "The Bohemian Countess of Schwabing".

=== Famous 60s and 70s Scene ===
In the 1960s and 1970s Schwabing became a hotspot for the flower power and 1968 movements as well as an internationally renowned party district with legendary clubs such as Big Apple, PN hit-house, Domicile, Hot Club, Piper Club, Tiffany, Germany's first large-scale discotheque Blow Up and the underwater nightclub Yellow Submarine, as well as many bars such as Schwabinger 7, Drugstore and Schwabinger Podium. From the active nightlife during this time, the district became known as "Schwabingbang". The Schwabinger Krawalle unrests of 1962 were a prelude for the student protests of 1968. In the last decades Schwabing has lost much of its nightlife activity, mainly due to gentrification and the resulting high rents. It has become the city's most coveted and expensive residential district, attracting affluent citizens with little interest in partying.

== Maps ==
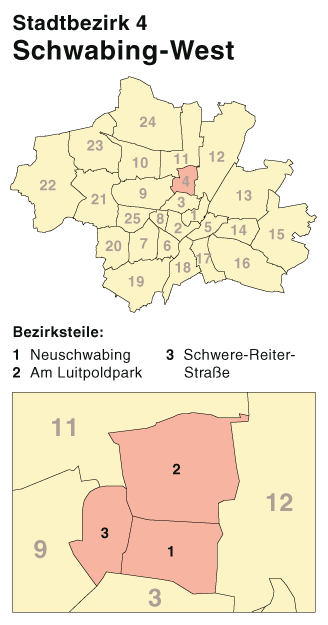
Borough 4 Schwabing-West: position in Munich

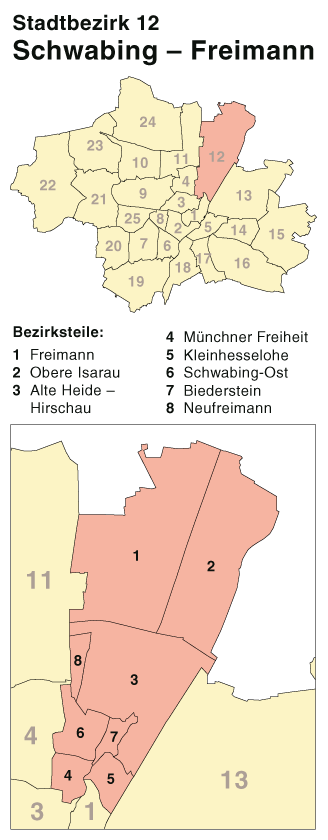
Borough 12 Schwabing-Freimann: position in Munich
