= List of Latvian women writers =

This is a list of women writers who were born in Latvia or whose writings are closely associated with that country.

== A ==
- Amanda Aizpuriete (1956–2023), poet, translator, poetry translated into several languages
- Lidiia Alekseeva (1909–1989), poet, translator and writer of short stories
- Aspazija, pen name of Elza Pliekšāne, (1865–1943), poet, playwright, journalist, feminist

== B ==
- Ingmāra Balode (born 1981), poet, translator
- Vizma Belševica (1931–2005), widely translated poet, semi-autobiographical novelist
- Lija Brīdaka (1932–2022), poet
- Anna Brigadere (1861–1933), playwright, autobiographer

== E ==
- Regīna Ezera, pen name of Regīna Šamreto (1930–2002), novelist, short story writer

== H ==
- Maria Holm (1845–1912), poet, playwright, wrote in German

== I ==
- Nora Ikstena (1969–2026), writer, novelist

== J ==
- Elfriede Jaksch (1842–1897), German-language novelist, short story writer
- Ilze Jaunalksne (born 1976), journalist, television presenter

== K ==
- Ivande Kaija (1876–1942), feminist, journalist, novelist
- Mirdza Ķempe (1907–1974), poet, playwright, translator
- Velga Krile (1945–1991), acclaimed poet, playwright
- Monta Kroma (1919–1994), modernist poet
- Marta Krūmiņa-Vitrupe (1908–2010), poet, essayist, chess player

== L ==
- Nechama Leibowitz (1905–1997), Latvian-born biblical scholar, biblical studies in Hebrew

== M ==
- Zenta Mauriņa (1897–1978), biographer, essayist, novelist, short story writer, wrote in Latvian and German

== N ==
- Aīda Niedra (1899–1972), novelist and poet

== P ==
- Margarita Perveņecka (born 1976), playwright, novelist

== S ==
- Irina Saburova (1907–1979), Latvian-born Russian novelist, poet, journalist, translator
- Anna Sakse (1905–1981), writer, editor and translator
- Rūta Skujiņa (1907–1964), Latvian poet
- Margarita Stāraste-Bordevīka (1914–2014), children's writer
- Lelde Stumbre (born 1952), playwright

== T ==
- Daina Taimina (born 1954), mathematician, acclaimed writings on mathematics
- Velta Toma (1912–1999), poet

== V ==
- Vaira Vīķe-Freiberga (born 1937), President of Latvia, essayist, non-fiction writer, writings on folk songs

== Z ==
- Māra Zālīte (born 1952), poet, publisher
- Inga Žolude (born 1984), novelist, short story writer, playwright, translator

== See also ==
- List of Latvians
- List of women writers
