= Rudolf Wilke =

German caricaturist and illustrator

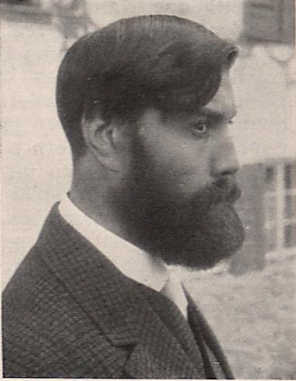
Rudolf Wilke (1900s)

Rudolf Wilke (27 October 1873, Braunschweig - 4 November 1908, Braunschweig) was a German caricaturist and illustrator; best known for his work at the satirical magazine, Simplicissimus.

== Life and work ==
He was the eldest child of Johannes Wilke, a carpenter. Two of his younger brothers also became artists; Hermann, who was a painter and commercial artist, and Erich, who was also a caricaturist.

After serving an artisanal apprenticeship, he attended the building trades school in Holzminden. His artistic inclinations led him in another direction, however, and he took lessons from the landscape painter, Adolf Nickol, at the polytechnic academy in Braunschweig. This was followed by studies at a private drawing school in Munich, and the Académie Julian in Paris.

He decided to settle in Munich, and opened a studio with his friend, the architect Bruno Paul. In 1896, he took part in a competition sponsored by the cultural magazine, Jugend, and was chosen to join their staff. Three years later, the publisher Albert Langen invited him to work at Simplicissimus.

In 1905 he married Amalie Mally, who was also an illustrator. They had two children; Charlotte, who became an artist, and Ulfert, who emigrated to the United States and became a museum director.

In 1906 Wilke, along with Olaf Gulbransson, Ludwig Thoma, and Eduard Thöny, persuaded Langen to convert Simplicissimus into a joint stock company, thereby giving more power to the staff to control the journal's direction.

From 1954 to 1993, the city of Braunschweig awarded a "Rudolf Wilke Prize", which included 1,500 Marks for a study trip abroad. Its first recipient was the graphic artist, Karl-Heinz Meyer. In 1964, a street in Munich's Solln district was named after Wilke.

== Selected works ==
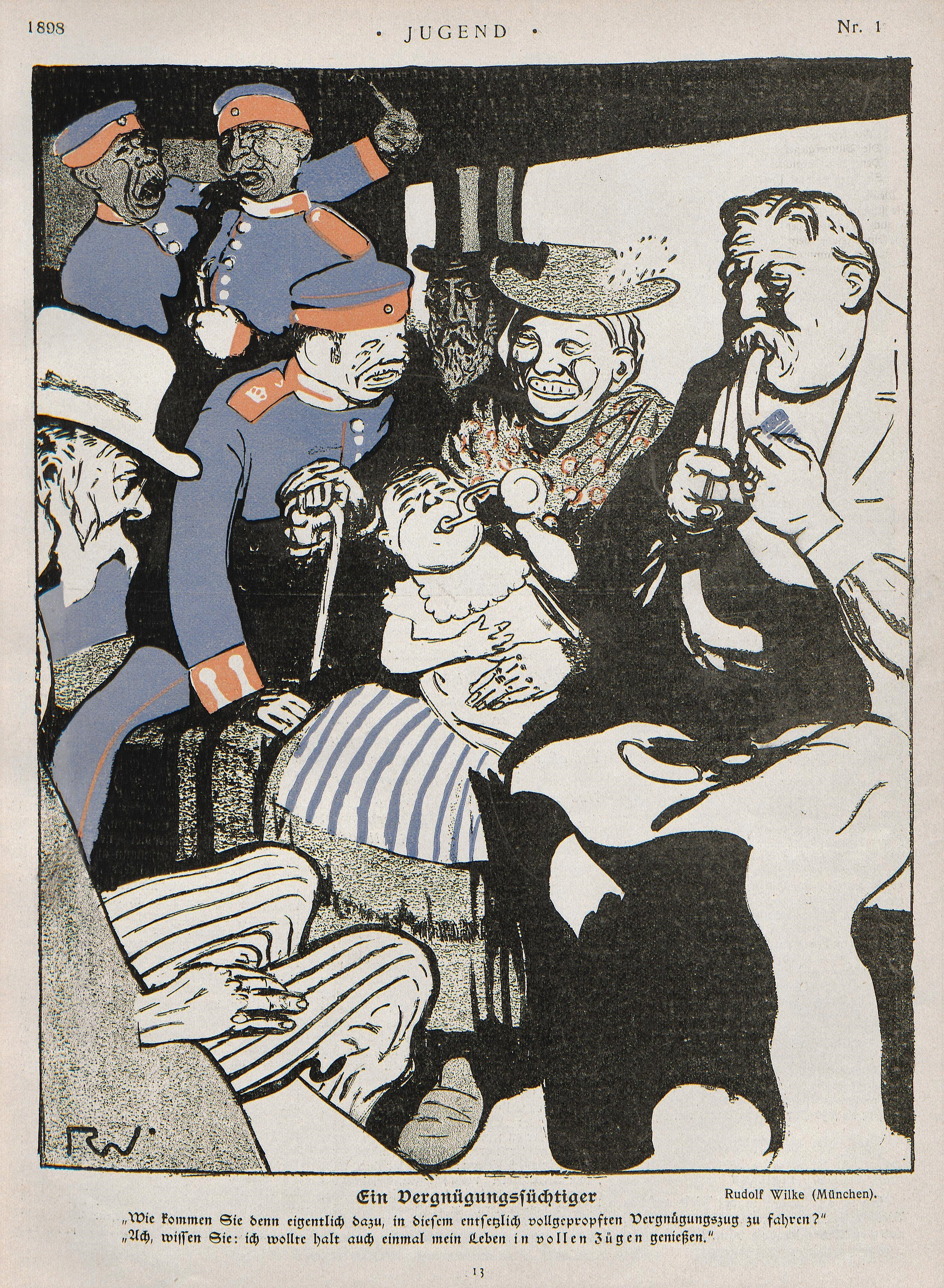
A Pleasure Seeker

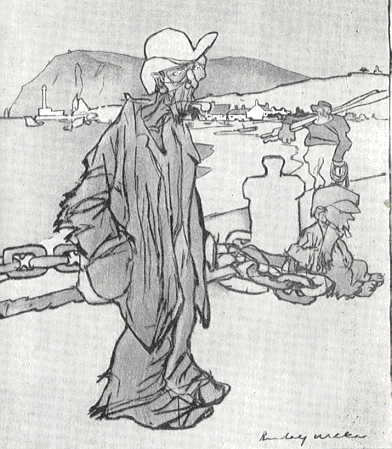
The Proud Spaniard

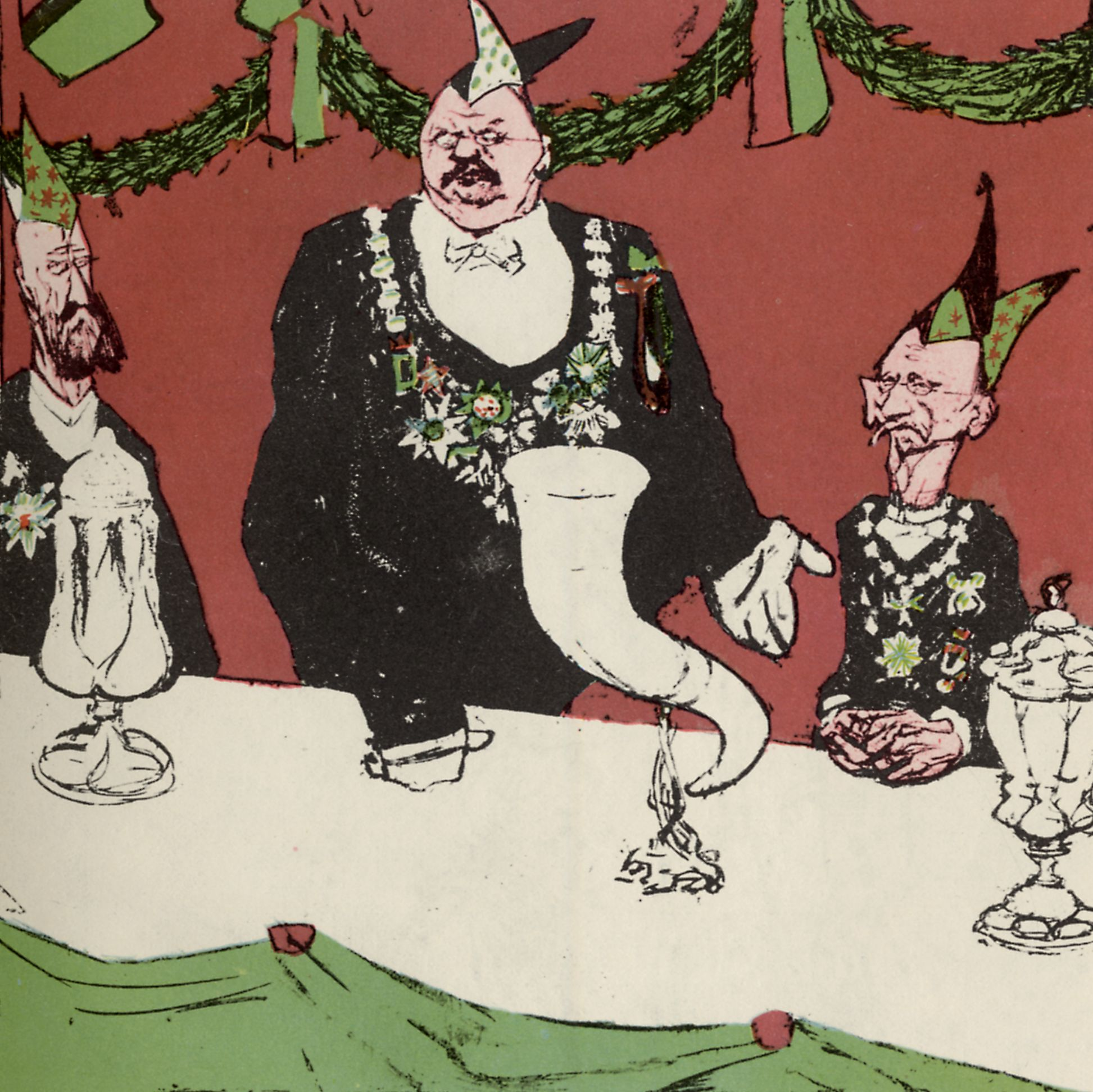
The Small Council

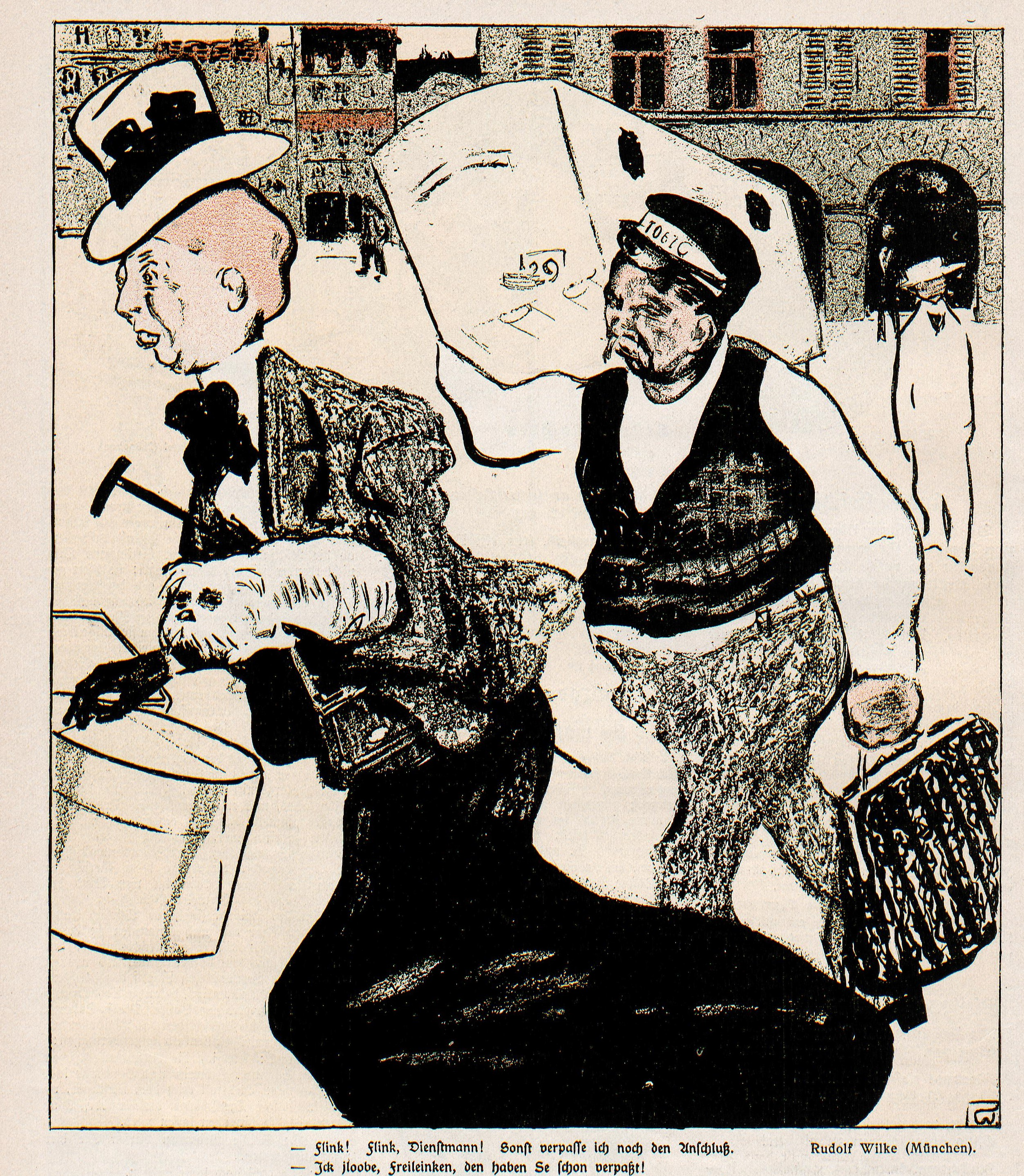
"Quick! Quick!, Porter"

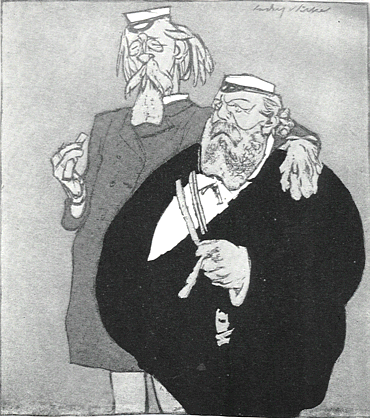
"Another Wind"

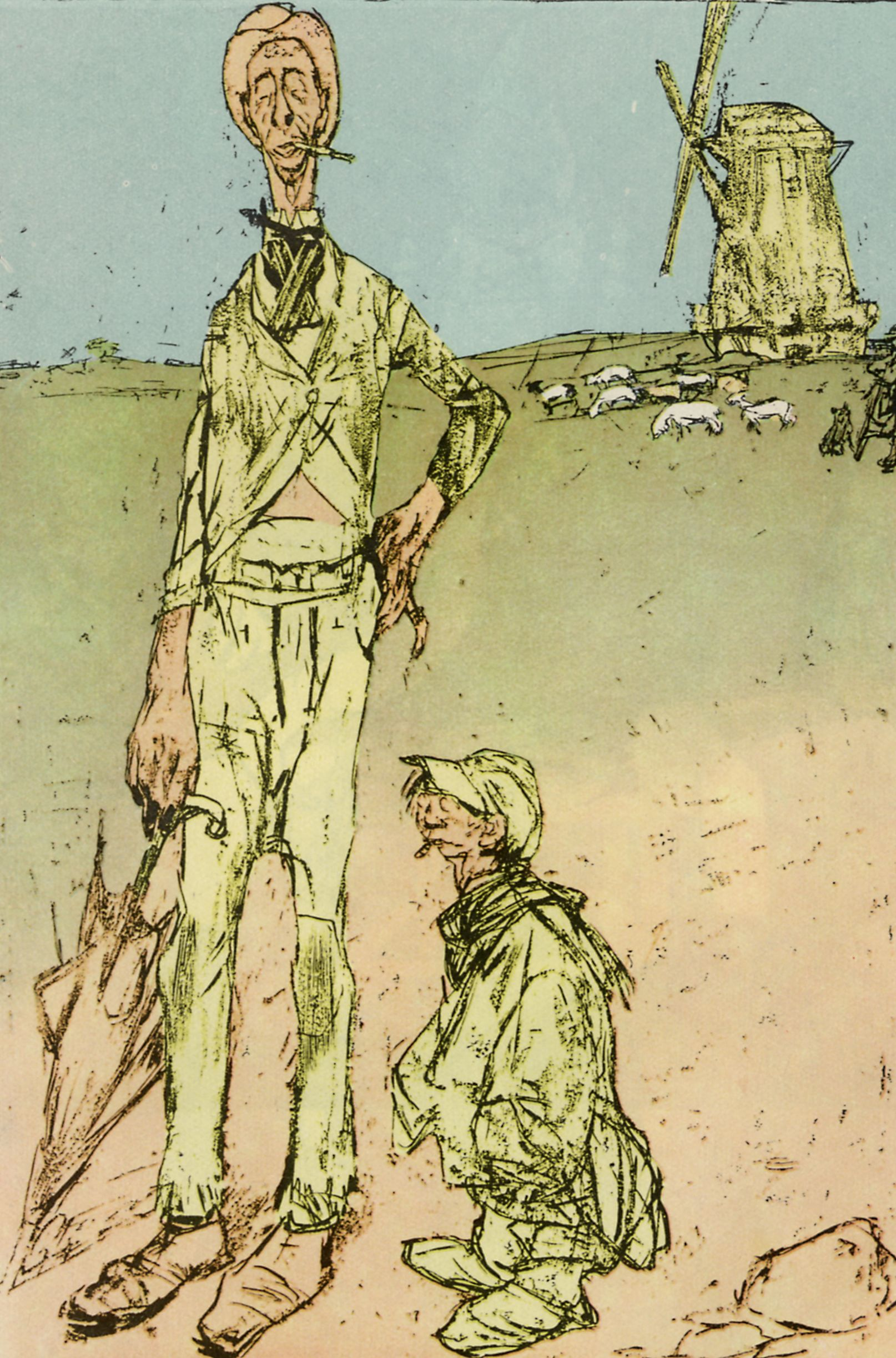
The Reproach
