= Nickol =

Nickol is a given name and a surname.

- Adolf Nickol (1824–1905), German painter
- Steven R. Nickol, American politician
- Nickol Tal, Israeli fencer

== See also ==
- Nickol Bay
