= Kurts =

Male given name

Ingars
- Gender: Male
- Name day: 26 September

Origin
- Region of origin: Latvia

Other names
- Related names: Kurt

Kurts is a Latvian masculine give name as well as a surname of various origins.

== Given name ==
- Kurts Fridrihsons (1911–1991), Latvian painter, illustrator and Anti-Soviet dissident
- Kurts Klāsens (1895—1973), Latvian sports sailor
- Kurts Plade (1898–1945), Latvian footballer

== Surname ==
- Alwyn Kurts (1915–2000), Australian actor
