= French Group =

Group of Latvian intellectuals persecuted in the Soviet Union

The French Group (Russian: Французская группа, Latvian: Franču grupa) was a group of Latvian intellectuals who used to meet in private apartments in Riga from 1945 to 1950 to discuss French culture, which was among their main professional interests: many of them were translators from French. In 1951 they were arrested by Ministry of State Security of the Latvian SSR, who dubbed them "French Group". A number of them were convicted to Gulag and sent to Mordovian ad Siberian labor camps. In 1956 they were partially exonerated and returned to Latvia. The complete rehabilitation happened in 1991.

== Convicted members ==
- Maija Silmale (1924–1973), student
- Mirdza Ersa, (1924–2008), student, actress
- Skaidrīte Sirsone (1920–1998), student
- Milda Grīnfelde (1909–2000), translator
- Ieva Lase (1916–2002), translator
- Elza Stērste (1885–1976), poet, translator
- Eleonora Sausne (1910–1969), teacher
- Miervaldis Ozoliņš (1922–1999), actor
- Kurts Fridrihsons (1911–1991), artist
- Arnolds Stubavs (1910–1958), actor
- Irma Stubava (1908–1999), actress
- Alfrēds Sausne (1900–1994), writer
- Gustavs Bērziņš (1910–1981), lawyer

== Remembrance ==
In 1994 Andris Rozenbergs made a documentary film about these events, Sods par sapni [Punishment for a Dream].

The Museum of the Occupation of Latvia held an exhibition "Artist Kurts Fridrihsons and the French Group" in 2004 and 2005. The museum has a permanent exhibition devoted to the group.

A chapter of the special December 2001 issue Karogs magazine was devoted to the "French Group.

The books Maija, Cher Ami! by Lelde Stumbre and MALA. Tā rakstīja Fridrihsons by Gundega Repše are devoted to the group.
