= Lelde =

Female given name

- Gender: Female
- Name day: 19 December

Origin
- Region of origin: Latvia

Lelde is a Latvian feminine given name. The name day of persons named Lelde is December 19.

== Notable people named Lelde ==
- Lelde Gasūna (born 1990), Latvian alpine skier
- Lelde Priedulēna (born 1993), Latvian skeleton racer
- Lelde Stumbre (born 1952), Latvian dramatist
