= Eduard Thöny =

German caricaturist and illustrator

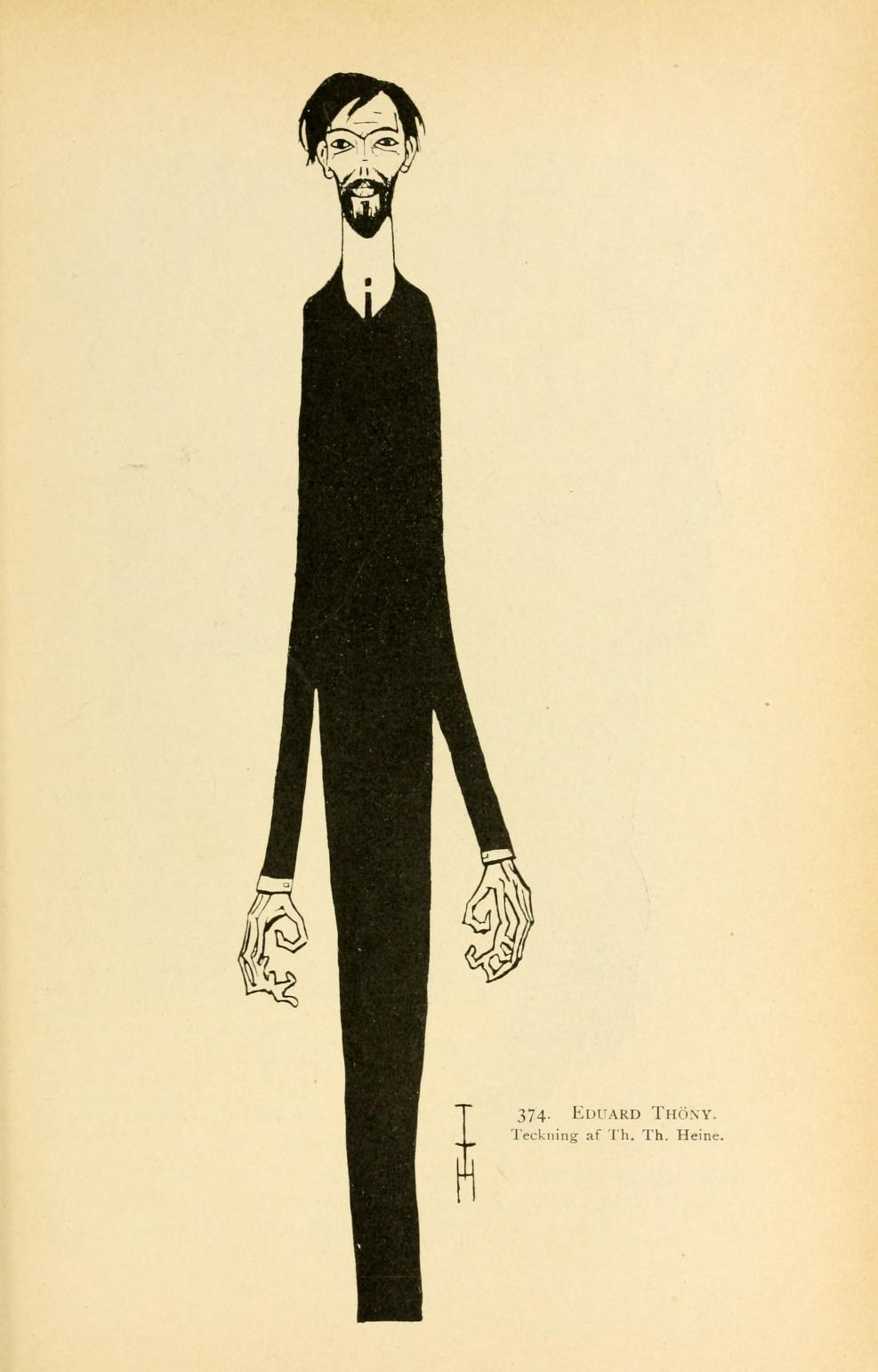
Eduard Thöny

Eduard Thöny (9 February 1866 - 26 July 1950) was a German caricaturist and illustrator known for his work for the journal Simplicissimus, to which he was invited to contribute by Albert Langen. Born in Brixen, he studied at the arts academy in Munich. His work for Simplicissimus included more than 2,500 pages of cartoons used to lampoon German society and the military. Thöny's drawings would appear in the journal until it ceased publication in 1944.

In 1904 Thöny traveled to Marseille, Algiers, Tunis, Naples and Rome in company with fellow artists Ludwig Thoma and Rudolf Wilke.

In 1906 Thöny, along with Olaf Gulbransson, Thoma, and Wilke, persuaded Langen to convert Simplicissimus into a joint stock company, thereby giving more power to the staff to control the journal's direction.

He died at Holzhausen on the Ammersee.

== The period of National Socialism ==
Thöny was a highly esteemed artist during the Nazi era. He received honors and awards. In 1933, he was made an honorary member of the Munich Art Academy and on April 20, 1938, Adolf Hitler appointed him professor, an honorary title without office or salary. In 1941, he received the Goethe Medal for Art and Science. He was represented with a total of 38 works at the Great German Art Exhibitions at the Munich Haus der Deutschen Kunst, including the oil painting Westwallarbeiter and the color chalk drawing Tiroler Bauern in 1940, and the oil painting Waffen-SS im Einsatz in 1943. In the final phase of World War II, Hitler included him in the Gottbegnadeten list in August 1944. He was also a member of the German National Council.
