= Adolf Nickol =

German painter (1824–1905)

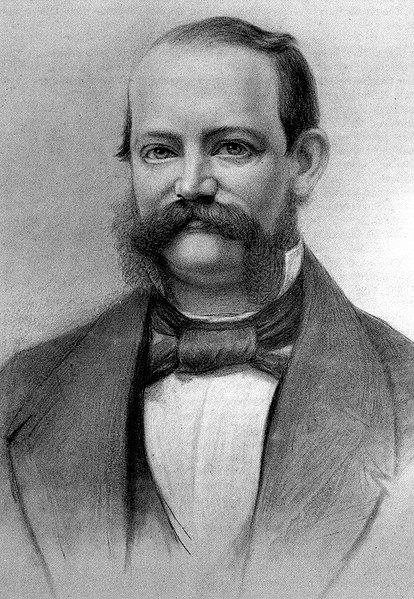
Self-portrait (date unknown)

Adolf Karl Friedrich Nickol, originally Nickel (10 March 1824, Schöppenstedt - 21 May 1905, Braunschweig) was a German landscape and animal painter.

== Life and work ==
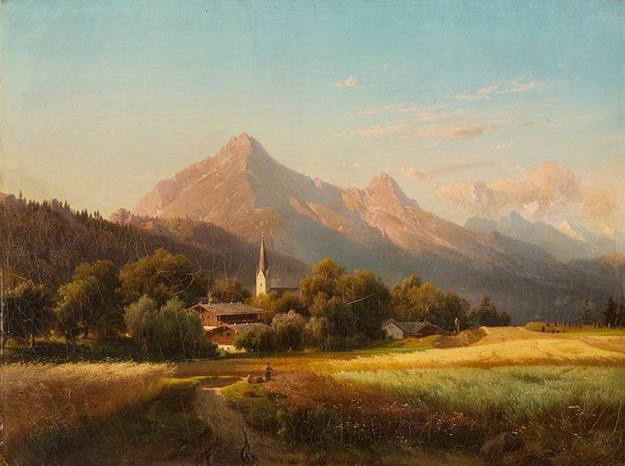
Alpine Landscape

He was born to Heinrich Anton Karl Julius Nickel (1778–1854), a dye master, and his wife, Johanna Magdalena Luise née Niemeier (1781–1848). They recognized his artistic talents, and arranged for him to take painting lessons.

When he was fourteen, he enrolled at the Collegium Carolinum in Braunschweig, where his primary instructor was Heinrich Brandes. In 1846, due to his above average work, he was able to attend classes at the Academy of Fine Arts, Munich, without actually being enrolled there. He also took an extended study trip through the Netherlands, Belgium and France.

In 1851, he returned to Braunschweig and opened his own studio. Further travels followed, and he spent a year in Rome from 1853 to 1854. Two years later his former professor, Brandes, proposed that the Collegium appoint him as his assistant, and the proposal was accepted. After Brandes' death in 1868, upon a recommendation by the Rector, Julius Dedekind, he replaced Brandes as the school's primary drawing teacher. In 1870, he was appointed a professor.

He received several awards from Wilhelm, Duke of Braunschweig. In 1899, he was appointed a Privy Councillor. He was awarded the Commander's Cross in the Order of Henry the Lion in 1903.

His notable students included Otto Keitel, Arnold Kramer, Constantin Uhde and Rudolf Wilke. Many of his works may be seen at the Städtisches Museum Braunschweig.
