= Ulfert Wilke =

American painter

- Born: 14 July 1907; Bad Tölz, Germany
- Died: 8 December 1987 (aged 80); Anahola, Hawaii
- Occupations: Artist, museum director and art collector

Ulfert Wilke (1907–1987) was an internationally recognized German-born American painter, museum director and art collector connected to the abstract expressionism movement. His father, Rudolf Wilke, was an illustrator for the satirical magazine, Simplicissimus.

== Biography ==
He was born in Bavaria, Germany, and immigrated to the United States in 1938. He is best known for his large canvas paintings and highly detailed lithographs that were inspired by calligraphic writing. Wilke was deeply intrigued by the written language, and much of his work was derived from his abstract interpretation of the shapes, colors and meanings of writing that he found in all languages and forms, including the poetry and ancient engravings of Asia and the Middle East. He was an avid art collector, particularly of tribal art, and was the founding director of the University of Iowa Museum of Art.

Wilke studied art at Harvard on a Carnegie scholarship before being drafted into the US Army in 1942. In 1947, he completed his master's degree in Art at the University of Iowa. Throughout the 1940s and 1950s, Wilke was an art teacher and director at several universities and museums. He received the Guggenheim Fellowship twice (in 1959 and 1960), which he used to travel to work and study first in Munich and Rome, and later Kyoto, Japan where he lived in monastery and studied Japanese Zen calligraphy under the monks.

Wilke returned to the US in the 1960s. He lived in New York City at this time and worked as a professor at Rutgers University. This period defined Wilke as an artist, and it was during this time that he became connected to the great New York school of artists of the 1950s and 1960s. He maintained close relationships with many famed artist colleagues including Ad Reinhardt, Julius Bissier, George Rickey, Mark Rothko, Lyonel Feininger, Max Beckmann, Mark Tobey, Kenzo Okada, Robert Motherwell and David Smith.

In 1968, Wilke's reputation as an art collector earned him a position as founding director of the University of Iowa Art Museum. He served as museum director there until relocating to Hawaii in 1978.

Wilke had many solo exhibitions throughout the United States and internationally, and was awarded many honors, including an exhibition and award from the American Academy and Institute of Arts and Letters. A few of the museums holding Wilke’s work in their collections today include the Solomon R. Guggenheim Museum, the Chicago Art Institute, San Francisco Museum of Modern Art, Columbus Museum of Art, Dayton Museum of Art, the Whitney Museum, New York University Art Center, Philadelphia Museum, Museum of Tel Aviv, Honolulu Academy of Arts, University of Iowa Museum of Art, Los Angeles County Museum of Art, Milwaukee Art Museum, Minneapolis Institute of Arts, and the Stanford University Museum of Art.
