= Auce =

Town in Dobele Municipality, Latvia

Auce Vecauce
- Town
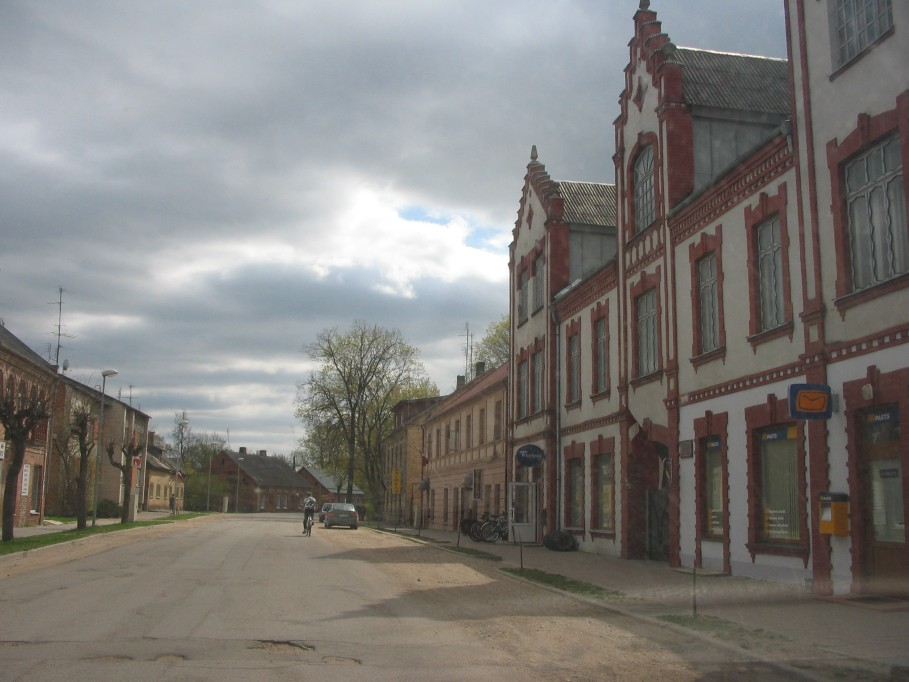
- Auce

- Coat of arms

- Location in Latvia
- Coordinates: 56°27′40″N 22°53′39″E
- Country: Latvia
- District: Dobele Municipality
- Town rights: 1924

Government
  - Mayor: Vija Keršus

Area
  - Total: 3.67 km^{2} (1.42 sq mi)
  - Land: 3.57 km^{2} (1.38 sq mi)
  - Water: 0.1 km^{2} (0.039 sq mi)

Population (2026)
  - Total: 2,131
  - Density: 597/km^{2} (1,550/sq mi)
- Time zone: UTC+2 (EET)
  - Summer (DST): UTC+3 (EEST)
- Postal code: LV-3708
- Calling code: +371 637
- Number of city council members: 8
- Website: www.auce.lv

Auce (Lithuanian: Aukė, Aucė; German: Alt-Autz, previously also Vecauce) is a town in Dobele Municipality, in the Semigallia region of Latvia. It is situated near the Lithuanian border.

== History ==
Before the 13th century, the territory of Auce was a part of a Semigallian Spārnene county. After the partition of Semigallia in 1254, the territory was granted to the Archbishopric of Riga. Auce is first mentioned in written sources in 1426 as Owcze. In 1616, the Old Auce (German: Alt-Autz) manor is mentioned for the first time when there was a regional assembly that was held (landtag) of the Duchy of Courland. In 1667, the first Lutheran church was erected in Auce. From 1768 until the Latvian agrarian reforms in the 1920s, the Old Auce manor was property of the Baltic German von Medem family.

Auce village started rapid development after the construction of the Jelgava-Mažeikiai railway in 1889. During World War I, Auce was occupied by the Imperial German army. The Germans established the Auce Airfield nearby, consisting of an aviation school hosting the Artillerie-Fliegerschule Ost I. After the Latvian War of Independence, Auce became part of the Republic of Latvia. In 1920, the Old Auce manor was nationalised, and it became property of the University of Latvia for use as a teaching farm for students of agriculture. In 1924, Auce received its town rights. Auce was the centre of the Auce municipality up until 2021, when it was merged with the Dobele municipality.

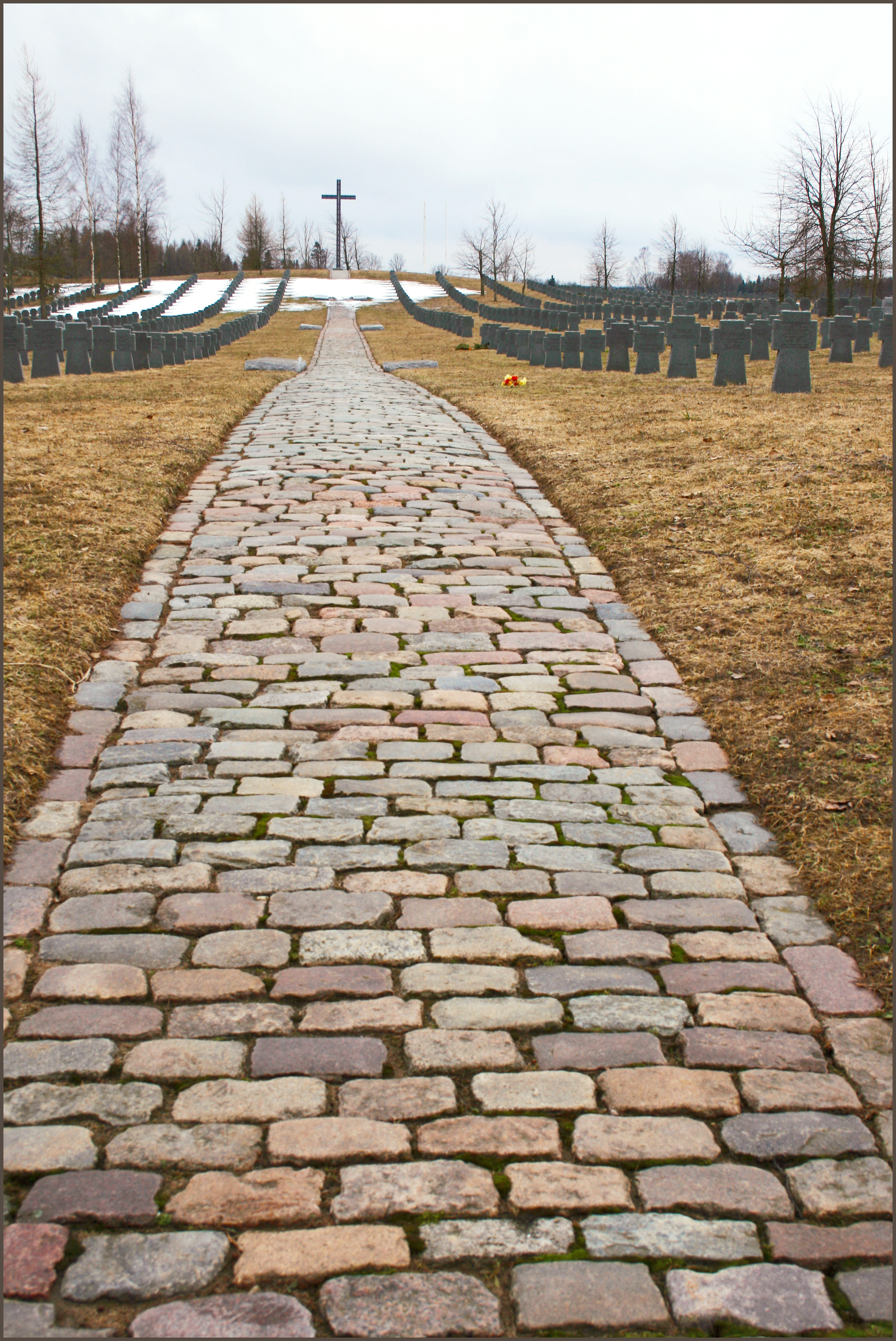
Cemetery of German soldiers killed during World War II in Auce.

== Notable people ==
- Lelde Stumbre (born 1952), politician and dramatist, author of many plays
- Signe Baumane (born 1964), animator, fine artist, illustrator and writer
- Ramona Petraviča (born 1967), politician, Welfare Minister, 2021/2022
- Ingmāra Balode (born 1981) a Latvian poet and translator.

=== Sport ===
- Ves Balodis (1933–2020), an Australian discus thrower who competed in the 1956 Summer Olympics
- Aivars Polis (born 1972), luger, competed in the men's doubles event at the 1992 Winter Olympics
- Ingus Bankevics (born 1985), basketball player

== See also ==
- List of cities and towns in Latvia
