= Korfiz Holm =

German publisher, translator and author (1872–1942)

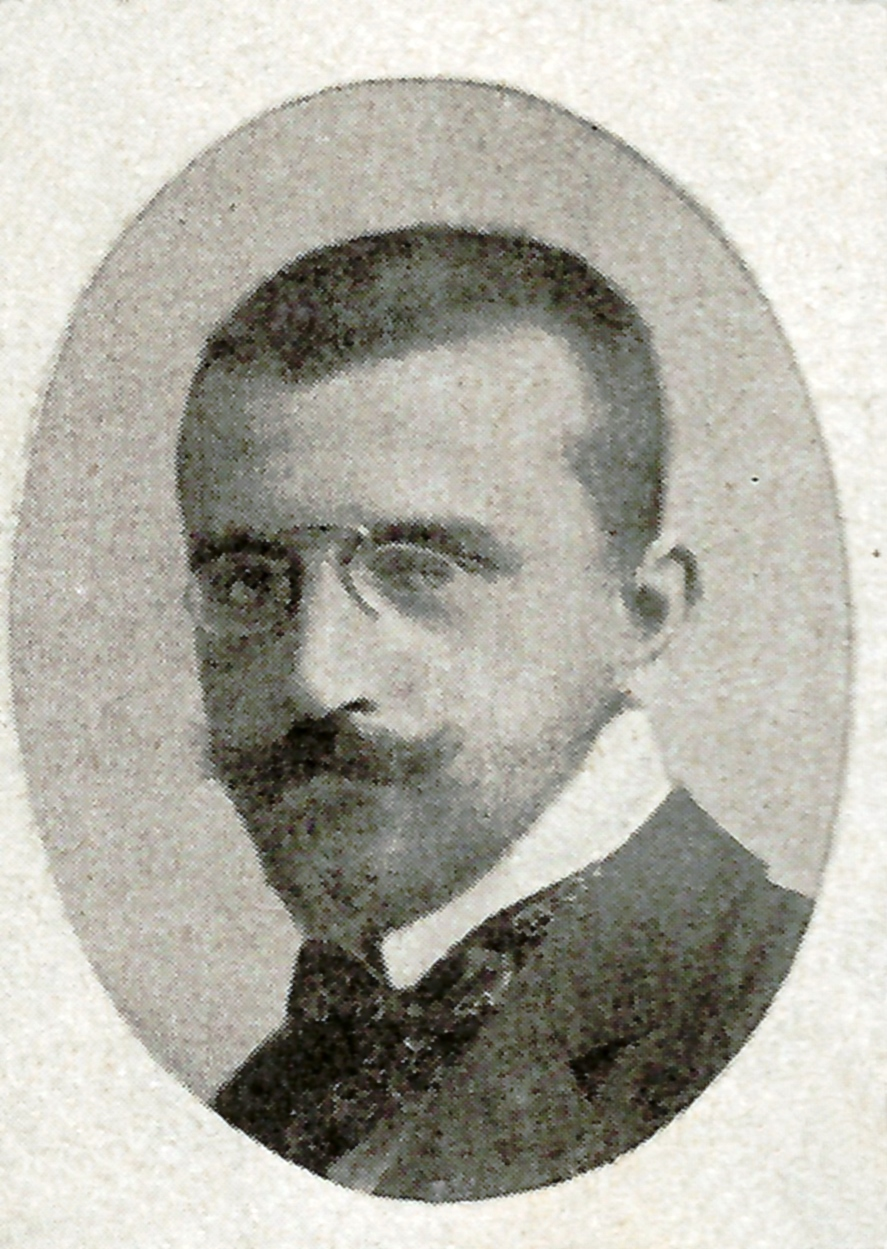
- Holm in 1905
- Born: Diedrich Heinrich Corfitz/Korfiz Holm; 21 August 1872; Riga, Livonia, Russia
- Died: 5 August 1942 (aged 69); Munich, Munich-Upper Bavaria Germany
- Education: Friedrich Wilhelm University of Berlin; Ludwig-Maximilians-Universität München
- Occupations: Writer; Publisher; Translator
- Spouse: Augusta "Annie" Ziemann (born Karoline Friederike Auguste Schleich: 1870–1942)
- Children: Edith Holm (1901-1978) and three step-children
- Parents: Diedrich Eduard Holm (1846–95) (father); Maria "Mia" von Hedenström (1845-1912) (mother)

Korfiz Holm (also Corfitz Holm (21 August 1872 – 5 August 1942 (Note: At the time if his birth the government was pursuing an active policy of Russification, which meant that even for members of the German speaking community, dates in official records in what was, at that time, the Russian Governorate of Livonia. were still recorded using the Julian calendar. According to the Julian calendar Korfiz Holm was born on 9 August 1872. However, it was in Germany that he received his university-level education and then built his career. Most of the accessible sources about his life are in western languages. For the reduction of confusion, the Gregorian calendar version of his birth date is preferred here. According to the Gregorian calendar Korfiz Holm was born on 21 August 1872.) was a German publisher, translator and author.

== Life ==
Diedrich Heinrich Corfitz/Korfiz Holm was born into a German speaking family in Riga, where his father Diedrich Eduard Holm (1846–95) worked as a railway company director. His mother, Maria "Mia" Holm (1845-1912: sometimes identified in sources by her maiden name as Maria von Hedenström), was the daughter of a Protestant pastor from Sweden: she achieved a measure of notability on her own account as a poet and novelist.

Holm attended school at the Gymnasium (secondary school) in Riga. At least one source refers to part of his childhood having been spent in Moscow, but most make no mention of this. If there was a period in Moscow it was almost certainly brief, and probably connected with his father's business as the director of a railway company: by the time his father died, in 1895, Diedrich Holm was in Saratov, a large industrial far to the south of Moscow. In 1885 his parents separated, however. After the divorce, which appears to have followed only in 1890 when his father wished to marry someone else, he moved with his mother to briefly to Munich and from there to Lübeck in Germany. It was at the prestigious "Katharineum" ("humanistic secondary school") in Lübeck that he completed the final two years of his schooling. A contemporary at the school (actually nearly three years younger than Holm) was Thomas Mann. During their time at the school, Holm was assigned to help out as "Mann's gymnastics coach". Thomas Mann viewed the whole business of school gymnastics with intense dislike, but could on occasion be persuaded to compromise his principles to the extent of touching the horizontal exercise bars with his fingertips, while casting a look of withering contempt at the equipment. When it came to the more obviously cerebral aspects of the school curriculum, the future creator of Buddenbrooks and Zauberberg was, according to school reports, an adequately committed pupil; and while the school authorities refused to view his conduct in gymnastics classes with complete equanimity, Mann's rebellious aversion to organised exercise did not prevent a friendship from forming with his schoolboy "gymnastics coach". Later, when they were all grown up and Holm had joined a publishing business, he intervened to help Mann obtain work with the Munich-based satirical magazine "Simplicissimus".

Holm was already 21 during the early summer of 1894 when, at a slightly older age than was conventional, he passed his "Reifeprüfung" ("Matriculation" - school graduation exam). He enrolled to study for a degree in Jurisprudence at Berlin University. That same year he moved on to the Ludwig-Maximilians-Universität München, intending to stay for a year as part of his degree course. As matters turned out, Munich would remain his home city for the rest of his life, though it is not clear that he ever completed his degree. Soon after arriving in Munich, he enrolled as an "Einjährig-Freiwilliger" for military service with the Royal Bavarian Infantry Lifeguards Regiment, under a scheme which permitted applicants to undertake their military service over a reduced duration of just one year, provided they agreed to pay their own costs in respect of equipment, food and clothing.

His first published poems appeared in the weekly magazine "Simplicissimus" in 1896. The new magazine had been launched by Albert Langen in April of that year. According to a story he later liked to relate, Holm had come across Langen in the first place only because of confusion on the part of his mother between the art publisher "Josef Albert" and the magazine publisher "Albert Langen". Josef Albert seems to have been a printer of then fashionable coloured post cards. His premises only occupied the ground floor of the building into which Holm's mother marched while, armed with a list of possible "art publishers" compiled by her son, she sought out a publisher for some illustrated poems that her son had produced. (The illustrations had been produced by one of her own contacts in the Munich arts world.) Joseph Albert's large brass name plate, including the name "Albert", dominated the various signs by the entrance. It seems probable that the publisher of "Simplicissimus", Albert Langen, had his office on a higher floor in the same building. In any event, shortly after publishing some of Holm's poems, Langen agreed that the young man could help him, starting on 1 October 1896, as an unpaid internee. The internship quickly became a paid job. Langen himself had married the nineteen year-old Dagny Bjørnson Sautreau in 1896, after which it seems that Holm was encouraged to take more responsibility within the business. By 1898 Korfiz Holm had gained his employer's confidence to the point at which he became a "Prokurist", contractually authorised to sign off certain agreements on behalf of Langen's publishing business. During the next few years titles by Heinrich Mann, Henrik Ibsen, Marcel Prévost and Verner von Heidenstam were published. Together, Langen and Holm evidently made formidable team: business was booming. In April 1909, however, Albert Langen died as a deferred consequence of Otitis media. After 1909, Holm managed the business as a trustee ("Kurator" / "Treuhänder").

Meanwhile, in 1899 Korfiz Holm married the young widow Augusta "Annie" Ziemann (1872-1942), thereby instantly acquiring three step-children. Edith Holm (1901-1978), the couple's fourth child, was born a couple of years following the marriage in Munich.

In 1918 or 1919 Holm became one of three co-owners of the Albert Langen publishing business. (Note: Source are silent as to the identity of the other two co-owners, implying that they were probably brought in as investors, content to leave Korfiz Holm to manage the business.) A further significant change in the ownership structure came about in 1932 when the Langen publishing business was merged with the Georg Müller publishing business. Holm remained in post as "Mitgeschäftsführer" (loosely, "Joint-CEO") of the combined publishing firm "Albert Langen — Georg Müller Verlag GmbH" until his death in 1942.

Korfiz Holm died in Munich after a long illness on 5 August 1942.

== Works ==
Korfiz Holm was the author of novels, short stories, poems and stage plays. His work can be classified as entertainment literature. He also published several engaging autobiographical volumes and shorter pieces about his childhood and years as a young man in Munich. He also translated works of literature into German from Russian, French and Danish. His translations of Gogol, still regarded as classics of their kind, found a particularly welcoming resonance with critics and readers.

=== Output (selection) ===
==== as author ====
- Schloß Übermut, Paris 1898
- Arbeit, München 1900
- Die Könige, München 1901
- Mesalliancen, München 1901
- Die Sünden der Väter und andere ironische Geschichten, München 1905
- Thomas Kerkhoven, München 1906
- Die Tochter, München
  - vol. 1 (1910)
  - vol. 2 (1910)
- Hundstage, München 1911
- Marys großes Herz, München 1913
- Herz ist Trumpf, München 1918
- Das Mädchen aus der Fremde, München 1926
- Ich – kleingeschrieben, München 1932
- Mehr Glück als Verstand, Berlin 1936
- Farbiger Abglanz, München 1940
- Vom Lauser zum Leiber, München 1942
- Ludwig Thoma und Olaf Gulbransson – wie ich sie erlebte, München 1953
- Das Kopierbuch Korfiz Holms, Berne [u. a.] 1989

==== translations into German ====
- Anton P. Čechov (Chekhov): Ja, die Frauenzimmer! und andere Novellen, München 1901
- Anton P. Čechov (Chekhov): Schatten des Todes!, München 1902
- Anton P. Čechov (Chekhov): Ein Zweikampf, Paris [u. a.] 1897
- Fedor M. Dostoevskij (Dostoevsky): Ein Werdender, München
  - vol. 1 (1905)
  - vol. 2 (1905)
- Robert de Flers: Logik des Herzens, München 1902
- Nikolaj V. Gogol': Ausgewählte Werke, München
  - vol. 1 (1924)
  - vol. 2 (1924)
- Nikolaj V. Gogol': Der Revisor, Berlin 1933 (translated jointly with Alfons Schultz)
- Nikolaj V. Gogol': Die schönsten Kosakengeschichten, München 1918
- Maksim Gor'kij (Gorky): Ein Verbrechen und andere Geschichten, München 1902
- Maksim Gor'kij (Gorky): Spleen, München 1906
- Maksim Gor'kij (Gorky): Ein Vagabund, München 1905
- Maksim Gor'kij (Gorky): Zigeuner und andere Geschichten, München 1903
- Gunnar Gunnarsson: Die Eidbrüder, Leipzig 1933
- Gunnar Gunnarsson: Strand des Lebens, München 1936
- Lev N. Tolstoj (Tolstoy): Das Ende eines Zeitalters, München 1906
- Lev N. Tolstoj (Tolstoy): Über die Ehe, München 1905
- Lev N. Tolstoj (Tolstoy): Vierzig Jahre, München 1904
