= Margarita Perveņecka =

Playwright

Margarita Perveņecka (born 16 January 1976 in Riga) is a Latvian playwright and prose writer. Her works have been performed in numerous Latvian theatres, and are noted for displaying an unusual view of the world, poetic expression, foreign words, science terms and neologisms, creating an alienated society. She received the Literatūras gada balva (Literature award) in 2011 for her novel "Gaetano Krematoss".

== Works ==
=== Plays ===
- Civilķēde jeb Jautrais karuselis. Žurnālā "Teātra Vēstnesis", 1998; iestudēta teātrī ACUD, Berlīnē, 2002
- Neaizmirstulīšu desas papīrs, ar nosaukumu Ņezabudka vulgaris iestudēta teātrī "TT", 2002
- Drakula (pēc B. Stokera motīviem), iestudēta Daugavpils teātrī, 2003
- Ludviga prodžekts, iestudēta Dailes teātrī, 2004
- Man patika dedzināt, iestudēta Dirty Deal Teatro, 2012

=== Screenplays ===
- Rehabilitācija. Žurnālā "Luna", 2000
- Atved mani mājās. Ekranizēts ar nosaukumu "Man patīk, ka meitene skumst", 2003

=== Prose ===
- Visi koki aizgājuši: stāsti. Rīga: Dienas grāmata, 2006
- Gaetāno Krematoss: atmiņas par gaismu: romāns. Rīga, Dienas grāmata, 2011
- Aspirantūra: romāns. Rīga, Dienas grāmata, 2023
