= Albert Langen =

German publisher

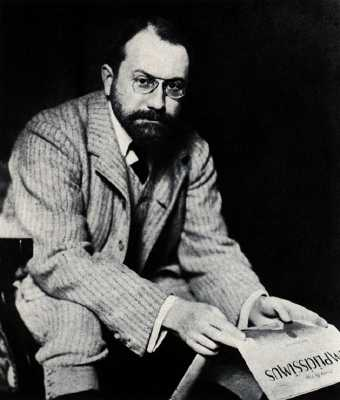
The German publisher Albert Langen (1869–1909) with a copy of Simplicissimus

Albert Langen (8 July 1869 – 30 April 1909) was a German publisher and founder of the satirical publication Simplicissimus.

== Early years ==
Langen was, after Martha and Martin, the third of four children born to Antwerp industrialist Friedrich Albert Langen and Ida Goeters. After the death of Langen's grandfather, Johann Jacob Langen, the family moved to Cologne on Jacordenstrasse 5, where Langen and his siblings grew up and where his younger sister, Elizabeth, was born.

After a clerical apprenticeship, Langen moved to Paris in 1890 to be trained as a painter. There, he became acquainted with many writers, including Henry Becque, Abel Hermant, Paul Hervieu, Octave Mirbeau, and Émile Zola, as well as artists including Théophile Alexandre Steinlen, one of the chief illustrators for Gil Blas Illustré, who was to become a lifelong friend. He also found a friend in the Dane, Vilhelm Petersen, who had lived in Paris since 1890 under the name Willy Gretor. Gretor was an art dealer and former painter who had lived a very Bohemian lifestyle as a young man, and was not above making questionable deals. For a short time, while he was trying to make a living in Paris, Frank Wedekind had served as Gretor's secretary and Gretor was the inspiration behind the Marquis in Wedekind's 1898 play, Der Marquis von Keith. Langen took over Gretor's grandiose apartment on the Boulevard Malesherbes, along with expensive furniture and an extensive collection of images (including some, it was said, of dubious authenticity). Inspired by Gretor, Langen considered opening an art gallery, but an encounter with the author Knut Hamsun, whom he also met through Gretor, led him in a different direction. Hamsun's novel Mysterium had been rejected by S. Fischer Verlag, but Langen was so moved by a German translation of the work (by Marie von Borch) that he offered to pay Samuel Fischer for the printing costs. When this attempt failed, Langen founded a publishing house to bring out the work himself. Hamsum's Mysteries, thus, came out in 1894 as the first title under the Langen imprint.

The following year, the publisher first moved to Leipzig and then to Munich. In addition to Scandinavian authors such as Bjørnstjerne Bjørnson, Georg Brandes, and Sven Lange, Langen also expanded into contemporary French and German literature. His first German title, Wedekind's Der Erdgeist (the Earth Spirit), was published in 1895. He was especially successful with paperback editions with signature bindings of, at first primarily French, artists such as Jules Chéret, Théophile Alexandre Steinlen, and especially Thomas Theodor Heine.

== 1896–1909 ==
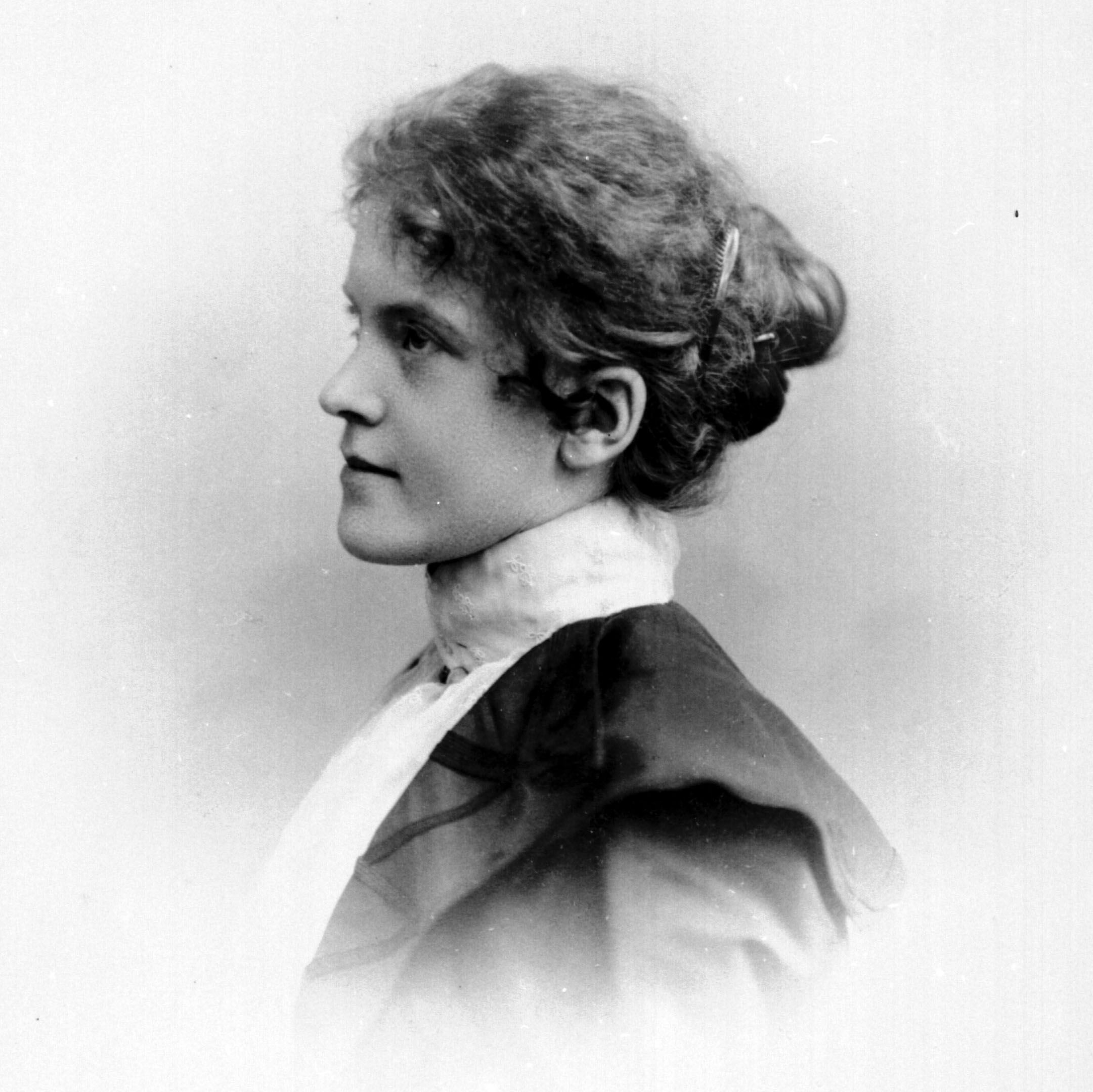
Dagny Bjørnson Langen

In 1896 he married Dagny Bjørnson, the youngest daughter of Bjørnstjerne Bjørnson. They would have two sons. That same year, in April, he published his first issue of Simplicissimus, using similar French magazines as his models. It was confiscated by the police on several occasions, due to its harsh criticisms, and was temporarily banned in both Germany and Austria. In the years that followed, he was able to publish works by Heinrich Mann, Henrik Ibsen, Marcel Prévost and Verner von Heidenstam. Thomas Mann also worked there as an editor. His first catalog, an artistically designed octavo, appeared in 1898.

Later that year, charges of lèse-majesté were brought against Heine and Wedekind for a poem called "In the Holy Land". Langen, as the one who approved its printing, was forced to flee to Switzerland. In 1899, he and his family moved to Paris, where he attempted to manage his magazine remotely. One of his primary contributors, Korfiz Holm, was given power of attorney. Dagny made frequent visits to Germany, for issues that had to be dealt with first-hand. He remained in exile until 1903, when George, King of Saxony, pardoned him on the condition of paying a "reprimand sum" in the amount of 20,000 Marks.

His second catalog appeared in 1904, by which time he had published 389 works by 117 authors. Two years later, as a result of his employees demanding a share of the profits, Simplicissimus became a "Gesellschaft mit beschränkter Haftung" (GmbH), the German equivalent of a limited liability company (LLC).

Shortly after, he and Dagny officially separated, when it became clear that he had been having an affair since the time they were in Paris. She took their children back to Paris and lived with the illustrator, Paul Iribe. He took advantage of these events to begin new projects. The first issue of März, a semi-monthly cultural review, appeared in 1907. Its editors included Ludwig Thoma and Hermann Hesse.

In April, 1909, he died from the effects of a severe middle ear infection; apparently contracted when he drove in an open car to the landing site of the zeppelin LZ1, near Lake Constance, on an unusually windy day. His will appointed four long-standing collaborators as curators for his publishing house. They took over the company, as his children were still too young, and made a formal acquisition in 1918. The company merged with Georg Müller Verlag in 1932 to form Langen Müller Verlag.

== Legacy ==
Langen is especially known for his contribution to modern book design. Heine and Bruno Paul were his most important book artists (designing the covers, dust jackets, vignettes, and illustrations), but both worked quite differently. Heine's drawing style was very fluid, whereas Paul presented strong blocking of surfaces and colors. Both artists were clearly influenced by the Art Nouveau. Other illustrators included Ferdinand von Reznicek, Eduard Thöny and the Norwegian Olaf Gulbransson who joined the firm in 1902 and whose minimalist drawing style eventually became as indispensable for Simplicissimus as Heine's. To Langen's credit, poster artist and genre painter Brynolf Wennerberg won a prize in 1909.

Langen was not a typical publisher, in that he ran the company not only out of economic considerations, but also with a cultural-political mission. His main Kulturverleger rival at the time, Samuel Fischer, also chose modernity as a focal point. Several writers (including Henrik Ibsen, Jakob Wasserman, and Ludwig Thoma) briefly published with Langen but then returned to S. Fischer, whose earlier entry into the market (in 1886) proved insurmountable.
