= Heinrich Brandes =

German painter

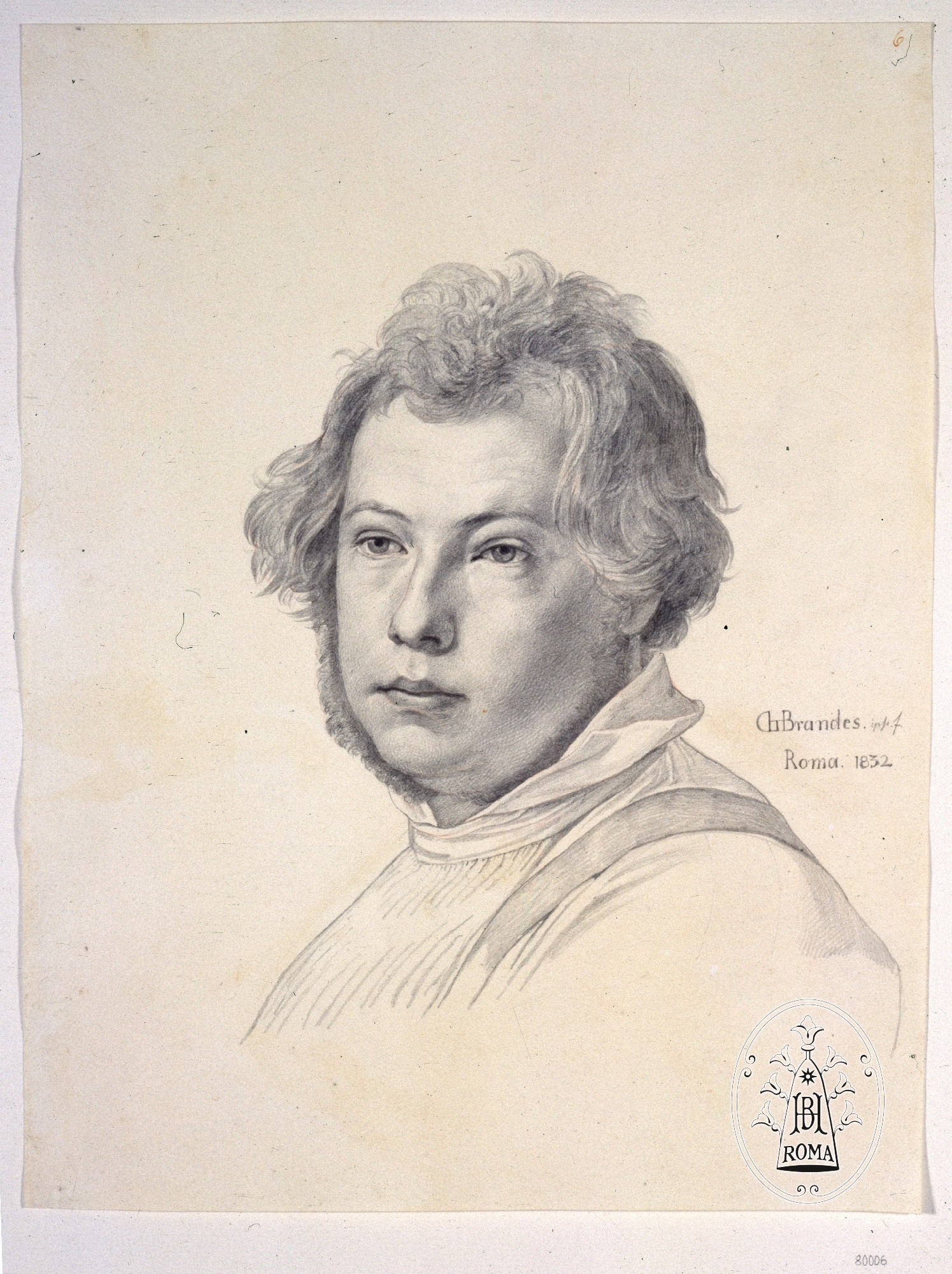
Self-portrait drawing by Brandes (1832)

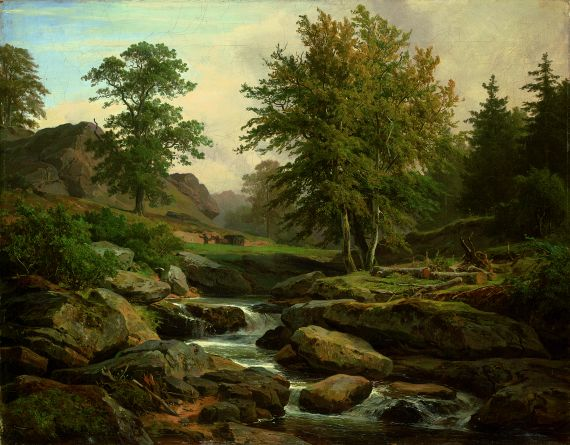
Landscape near Harzburg (1868)

Georg Heinrich Brandes (German: [ˈbʀandəs]; 23 May 1803 – 6 October 1868) was a German painter.

== Life ==
Brandes was born at Bortfeld, near Brunswick, and learned the rudiments of painting under the guidance of F. Barthels at Brunswick. From 1823 to 1825 he attended the Academy of Munich, where he first devoted himself to historic painting under the tuition of Peter von Cornelius, but then turned his attention to landscapes.

On leaving the academy, he proceeded to the Tyrol. His pictures from the Bavarian mountains won him a reputation by their grandeur of disposition and effective colouring. In 1830–31 he visited Italy, and passed much of the time in Rome. On his return he settled down in Brunswick, and became a teacher of painting and design as well as gallery inspector at the Ducal Museum. In 1845, together with Neumann, he restored the murals in Brunswick Cathedral. He died at Brunswick on 6 October 1868.

== Works ==
His most important works include:

- View near Rome.
- Subiaco.
- The Inundation.
- Landscape in the Harz Mountains during a Thunderstorm.
- View near Salzburg (in the New Pinakothek at Munich).

== See also ==
- List of German painters
