= Aīda Niedra =

Latvian writer

Aīda Niedra (March 23, 1899 – November 23, 1972) was a Latvian writer. She is considered one of the most important Latvian women novelists.

She was born Ida Niedra in Vidzeme. After completing secondary school, she worked as secretary to a justice of the peace in Riga until 1932. She moved to Germany as a war refugee in 1944; in 1949, she emigrated to the United States. She died in Santa Monica, California at the age of 72.

== Selected works ==
- Erosa elēģijas, poetry (1924)
- Sarkanā vāze, novel (1927)
- Dziesminiece, poetry (1934)
- Sieva, novel (1938)
- Rūžu Kristīne, novel (1939)
- Katrīna Ābele, novel (1950)
- Trīs Caunu sievietes, novel (1954)
- Pērles Majores draugs, novel (1959)
