= Elfriede Jaksch =

German language Latvian writer

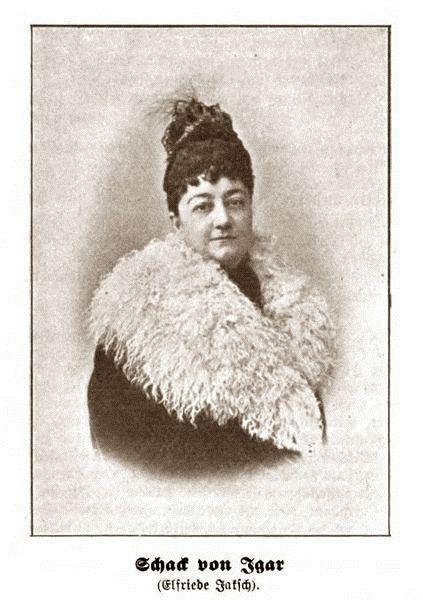
Photograph of Elfriede Jaksch

Elfriede Jaksch (1842–1897) was a 19th-century German-language author in the Russian Empire. She wrote a number of popular novels and novellas under the pen name Shack von Igar.
