= Ludwig Thoma =

German author, publisher and editor

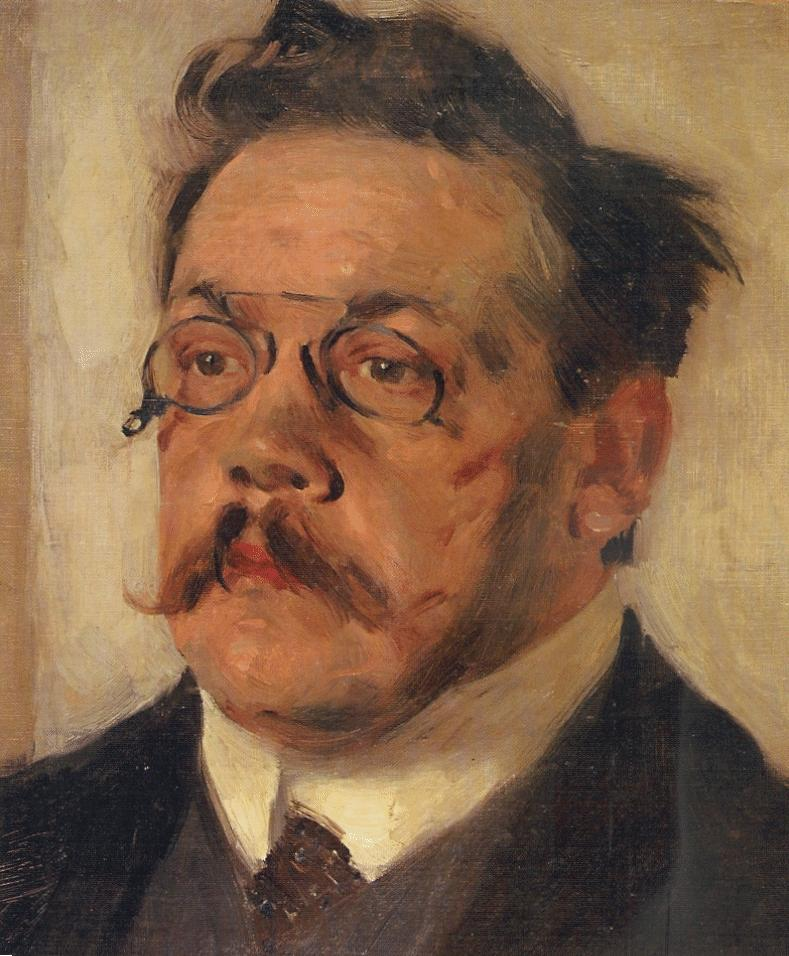
Ludwig Thoma, by Karl Klimsch

Ludwig Thoma (German: [ˈluːt.vɪç ˈtoː.ma]; 21 January 1867 in Oberammergau – 26 August 1921 in Tegernsee) was a German author, publisher and editor, who gained popularity through his partially exaggerated description of everyday Bavarian life.

After graduation from the Imperial Latin School in Landstuhl (today: Sickingen- Gymnasium Landstuhl), he first studied Forestry in Aschaffenburg, then Law until 1893 at the Ludwig-Maximilians-Universität München and the University of Erlangen–Nuremberg. Subsequently, he settled down as a lawyer, at first in Dachau, later in Munich.

After 1899, he worked for the magazine Simplicissimus and published humorous narrations, comedies, novels and stories. Thoma satirized Bavarian rural and small-town life. His serious peasant novels Andreas Vöst (1905), Der Wittiber (1911), and Der Ruepp (1922), as well as his humorous collections Assessor Karlchen (1900), Lausbubengeschichten (Tales of a Rascal, 1904), and Tante Frieda (Aunt Frieda, 1906), are characterized by authenticity of regional language and life. Thoma's dramas, including Die Medaille (The Medal, 1901), Das Säuglingsheim (The Orphanage, 1913), and especially Moral (1908), reflect elements of folk theatre.

In 1907, he married 25-year-old Marietta di Rigardo, who was born in the Philippines. The marriage, however, did not last; Marietta was soon bored and by 1911 Thoma and Marietta were divorced. In the later years of his life, he wrote nationalistic propaganda agitating against left-wing politicians (e.g. for the newspaper Miesbacher Anzeiger).

During World War I, he served as a medical orderly. In July 1917, he joined the German Fatherland Party.

His best-known works are Der Münchner im Himmel (The Munich Man in Heaven), which was adapted into an animated short film released in 1962, the Lausbubengeschichten (Tales of a Rascal) and Jozef Filsers Briefwexel (Jozef Filser's Letters). Lausbubengeschichten was made into a movie in 1964, also released in English under the title Tales of a Young Scamp.

== Birth and schooling ==
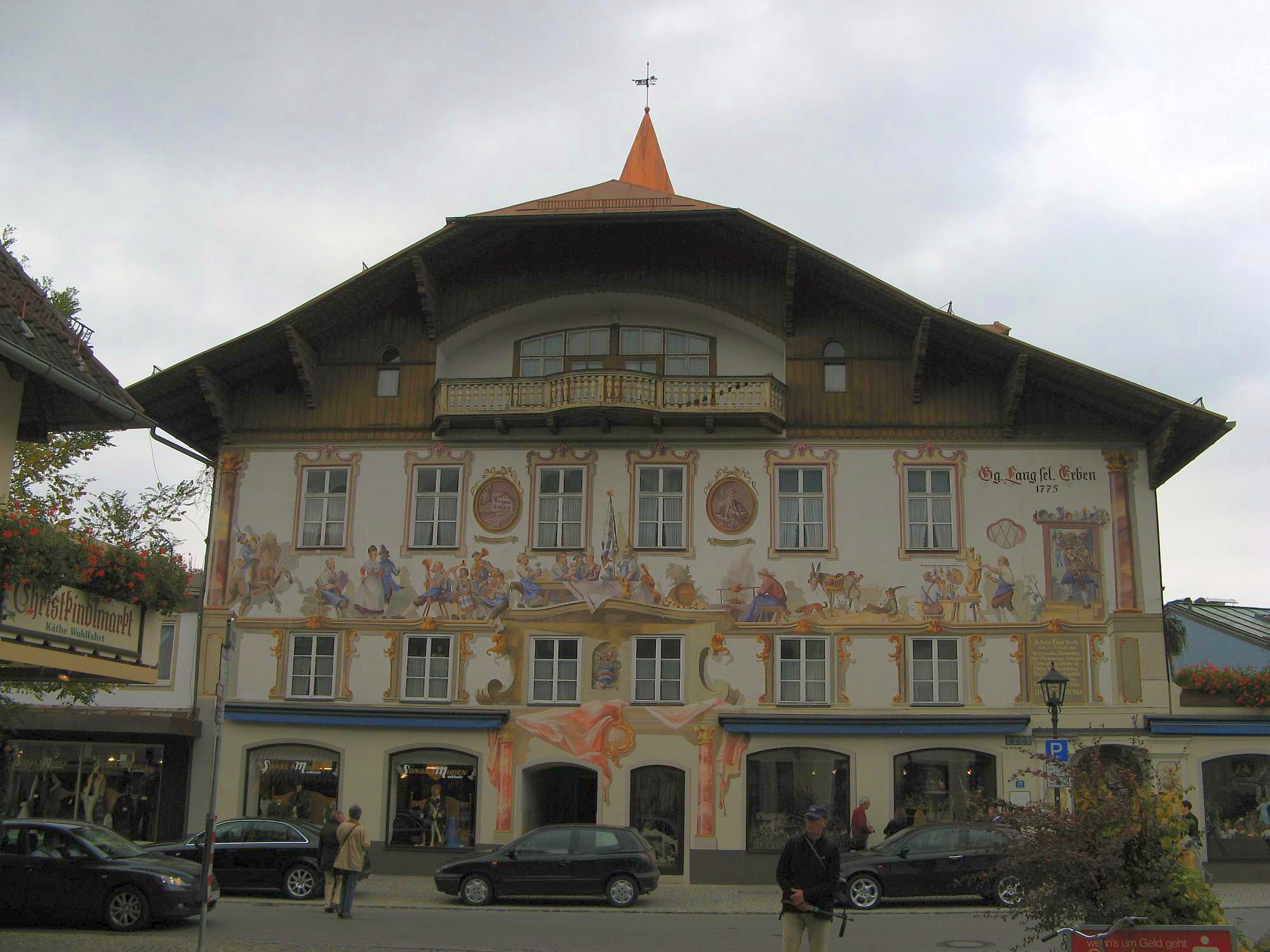
Birthplace of Ludwig Thoma in Oberammergau

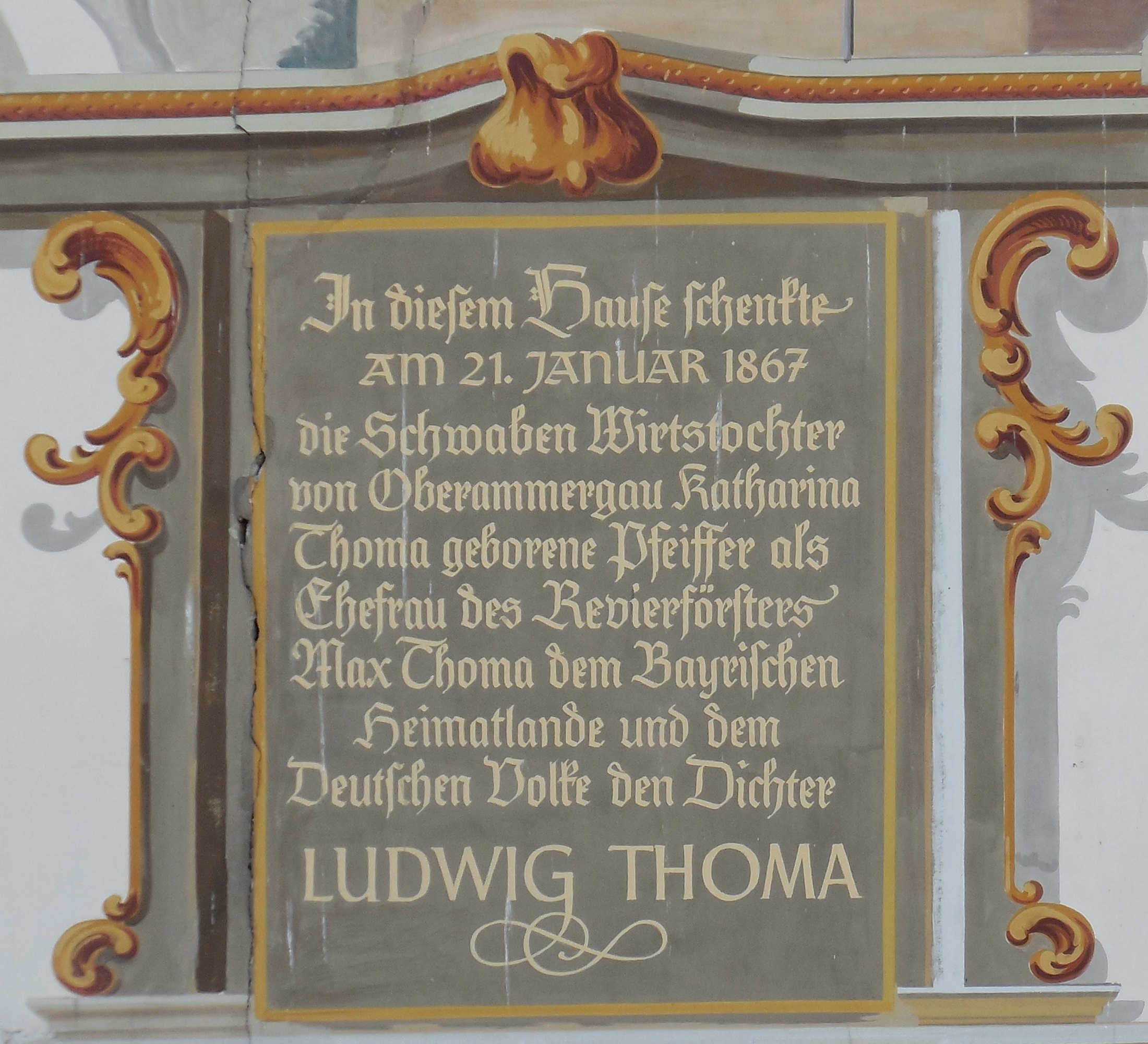
Detail of the house where he was born (on the right, behind the lantern)

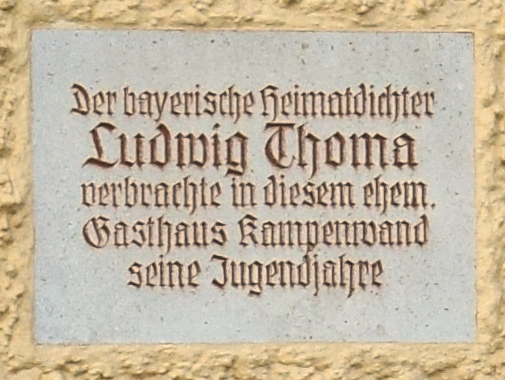
Memorial plaque for Ludwig Thoma at the former inn Zur Kampenwand in Prien, today the Ludwig Thoma Grammar School

Ludwig Thoma was born as the fifth child of forester Max Thoma and his wife Katharina Thoma, née Pfeiffer, in Oberammergau. His paternal ancestors were active in the forest service; his great-grandfather Joseph von Thoma (1767–1849) had headed the Bavarian Forestry Commission and had been elevated to the nobility as a life peer for his services. His mother's family initially ran an inn in Oberau, later in Oberammergau. He spent the first years of his life in the forester's lodge of Vorderriß on the River Isar near the Tyrolean border, a very remote and lonely area at the time. His upbringing was essentially in the hands of his nanny Viktoria Pröbstl, with whom Ludwig Thoma had a very close relationship.

According to Katharina Thomas Willen, Ludwig was to have pursued a career as a priest. As a result, she attached great importance to a good education for her son; private tutors taught him to read and write even before he started school, and he received private Latin lessons early on.

Shortly after the family moved to Forstenried near Munich in 1874, when Ludwig was only seven years old, his father died and the family were surprised to find themselves destitute: Viktoria Pröbstl had to sell furniture from the forester's lodge to pay for the burial. Thoma's mother had to raise seven children alone. The children initially had one of their father's colleagues, Karl Decrignis, as a guardian. Ludwig and his sister Luise were taken in by their uncle Albert Paulus in Landstuhl. There Ludwig attended one year of primary school, and then went into the second year of the Latin school. The death of his father and separation from his family affected his school work; as a result he was a difficult student who received few favourable reports:

There's something sly about his character. When censured and punished, he shows an unusual coldness and stubborn, defiant insensitivity for his years.

— Klaus (2016), p. 21

In 1876, his mother rented the pub Zur Kampenwand in Prien am Chiemsee, which she managed together with Viktoria Pröbstl and her daughters. Ludwig began a period of alternating between boarding school and holidaying in his family's "idyllic home", as he calls it in Lausbubengeschichten ("Tales of a Rascal"). Misdemeanours and conflicts with teachers there are probably based on real experiences: "There is sufficient evidence that Thoma condensed these altercations for his stories, but by no means invented them." In 1877, he moved to the boarding school of the study seminar in Neuburg an der Donau. He had to repeat a year at the study centre in Burghausen. Here Georg Pauliebl was one of his friends; his life story was described by Thoma in the story Der heilige Hies ("Saint Hies").

In 1879, Thoma moved from Burghausen to the Wilhelmsgymnasium. During his school days he lived as a lodger, and he described this time in his Erinnerungen ("Memoires"). He also had to repeat a year in Munich and stayed until 1885. The family moved to Traunstein in 1883, where his mother leased the inn Zur Post. The trigger for the change of location seems to have been a "shameful act" on the part of Ludwig, which also made it impossible for his sister Marie to accept a suitor. In 1884, after the death of Karl Decrignis, the forest officer Ludwig von Raesfeldt took on the guardianship of the Thoma siblings.

In 1885, Raesfeldt succeeded in getting Ludwig admitted to the final year of the grammar school in Landshut, after he was threatened with expulsion from his school in Munich. Martin A. Klaus quotes the "special remarks" from Thomas Landshut's high school diploma:

He did his earlier studies at the Wilhelmsgymn. in Munich, but behaved there in such a way that he had to be advised seriously to change schools.

— Klaus (2016), p. 26

In Landshut, Thoma passed his Maturität examinations in 1886. At the suggestion of his classmates, he went up to give the graduation speech: "But the young man failed. Thoma stood silently in front of the auditorium, unable to choke out a word, until the headmaster rushed to the podium, improvised a speech and saved the situation."

== Legal studies and career ==
Like his father, Thoma wanted to be a forester and began studying forest science in Aschaffenburg in the winter term of 1886/87, but dropped out after the first year. During his time in Aschaffenburg he joined the oldest forestry corps (Forstcorps), the Corps Hubertia of Munich. Because he did not attend a Mensur, he was dishonourably dismissed ("without a ribbon").

In the winter term of 1887/1888 he moved to the Ludwig-Maximilians-Universität München and enrolled for a degree in law. Like his father before him, he became a member of the Corps Suevia Munich. In Munich he did compete in two compulsory duels, but stayed on the defensive each time. So he received the (at his time) desirable schmiss ("duelling scar"), but was also released from the Corps Suevia without a ribbon. On the advice of a fellow student, he switched to the University of Erlangen–Nuremberg for the summer term; he studied here without getting involved in any clubs, and on 1 August 1890, he received the certificate for entry into legal clerkship. For Martin Klaus, failure and the subsequent change of educational establishment is symptomatic of Thoma's character:

The move to Erlangen following the "Suevia" embarrassment is an important indication of how little Thoma could cope with a tarnished public image of himself. In order to keep up appearances in such situations, he preferred to switch to a new environment where people knew nothing about his embarrassing behaviour.

— Klaus (2016), p. 44.

In his Erinnerungen, Thoma describes his times as a schoolboy in Munich and Prien verbosely, but he treats his degree studies very briefly:

I spent two terms at the Forestry Academy in Aschaffenburg, then I switched to law, studied in Munich and Erlangen, where I passed the exam after the prescribed time had expired. My experiences at the university were the usual ones, so much so that I don't need to describe them.

— Ludwig Thoma, Erinnerungen, p. 131

From 1890, he worked as a legal intern at Traunstein. At the same time he wrote a dissertation on the topic The Theory of Self-Defence with criminal law professor Karl Lueder. On 6 December 1890, he passed the oral exam with the (lowest possible) grade of Rite ("satisfactory"). A handwritten copy of his doctoral thesis with its final correction edits was found in Thoma's estate; However, Thoma never had them printed and therefore did not receive a doctorate certificate. Strictly speaking, he was therefore wrong to claim a doctorate.

== Early successes as a writer ==
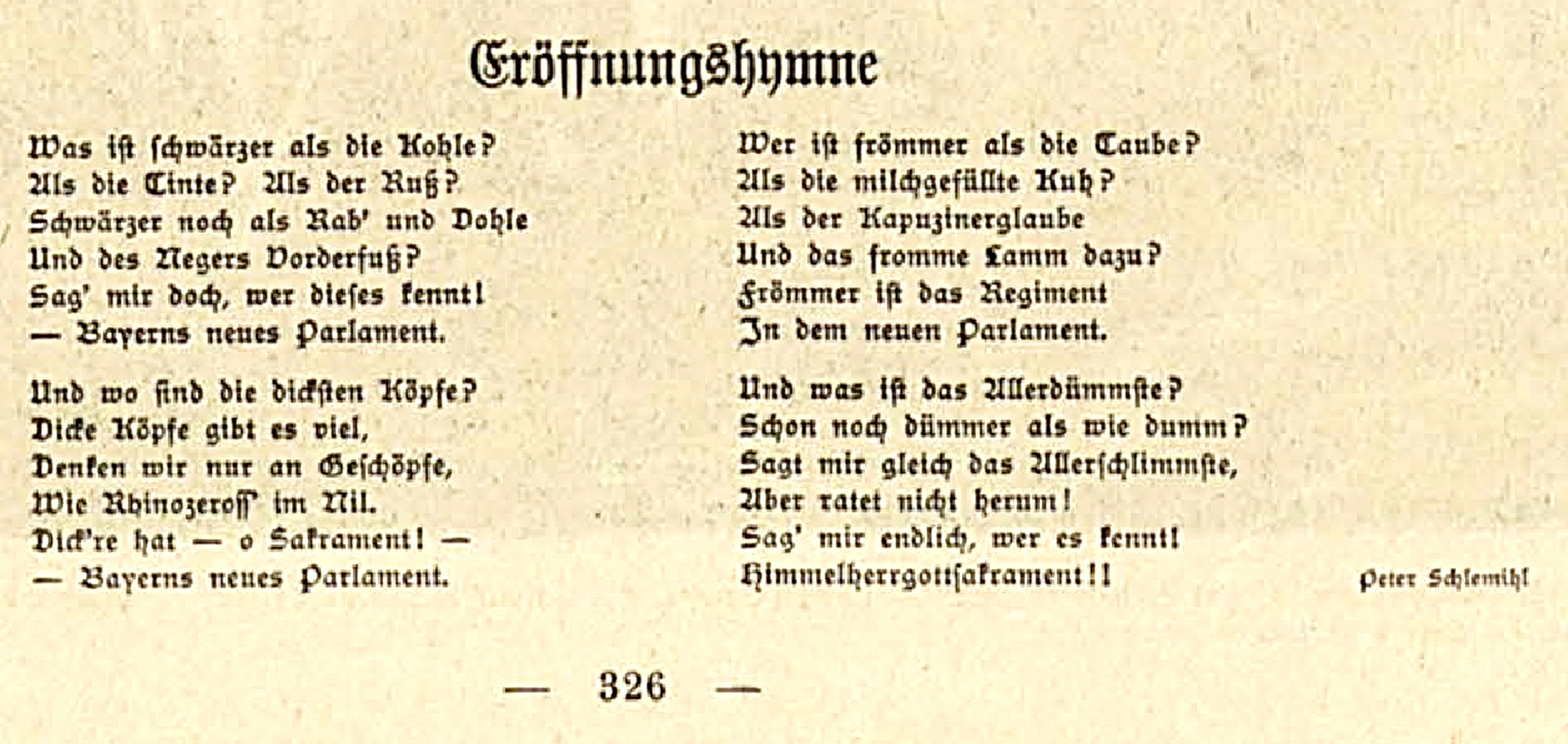
Ludwig Thoma wrote under the pseudonym "Peter Schlemihl" for the magazine Simplicissimus. Here is a satirical poem on the Bavarian Parliament from 1905.

In April 1895, Ritter published Thoma's short story "Der Truderer" in the literary supplement Sammler, in which cheerful events of rural life were recorded for the first time in prose form. Ludwig Thoma also commented on political issues, writing an article about the party conference of the Bavarian SPD and their agricultural policy for the Augsburger Abendzeitung in October. In it, he opposed the reform efforts of the Social Democrats and described Clara Zetkin as a "Russian virago".

His early successes and better financial circumstances made him consider marriage. As early as 1892 he had met Johanna Sachs from Nuremberg, daughter of a grain dealer, whom he cautiously began to woo. But when her father gave him no further hopes, he gave up the plan.

In late 1896, Thoma made another attempt to find a wife. On the basis of a marriage advertisement, he began to exchange letters with several candidates, which, however, did not result in anything. He mocked women a little later in his first comedy Witwen ("Widows"). In spring 1897, Thoma moved to Munich, where he shared a bachelor's apartment with his school friend, Richard Rothmaier, while Viktoria Pröbstl ran the household. With a student friend, he started a legal practice, to which he devoted less and less time in the years that followed. Adolf Hölzel, who worked in the Dachau Artists' Colony, and Bruno Paul, who celebrated his first successes in the Jugend, illustrated his collection of stories Agricola: Bauerngeschichten ("Stories of the Peasantry") in 1897. This, Thoma's first book, appeared in the Waldbauer bookstore in Passau. Paul switched in 1897 to the satirical weekly Simplicissimus founded the year before by Albert Langen, whose employees Thoma also met in Café Heck on Odeonsplatz.

In 1898, he sent the first manuscripts to Simplicissimus, which were well received by publisher and public. When the edition of 31 October 1899 was confiscated for lèse-majesté, author Frank Wedekind, draftsman Thomas Theodor Heine and publisher Langen fled abroad to avoid prosecution. Simplicissimus needed a responsible person on site at the editorial office in Munich. Langen considered hiring Thoma as editor-in-chief, his confidant Korfiz Holm had previously spoken out against Thoma:

Moreover, in his literary judgment he adopts the viewpoint of a night watchman, declares [...] that everything a woman has written is crap, etc. I'm afraid he's too blunt and outspoken for Simplicissimus

— Letter from Korfiz Holm to Albert Langen, quoted in Rösch (2012), p. 42

But Langen chose Thoma, whose comedy Die Witwen had failed him as well as Munich director Jocza Savits. In September 1899, Thoma sold his law firm and became a permanent editor of Simplicissimus.

== Editor-in-Chief at Simplicissimus ==
In the years that followed, Thoma was one of the most important authors for Simplicissimus. He appeared as a satirist under several pseudonyms - he usually wrote his poems as "Peter Schlemihl". At the beginning of 1901 he wrote the one-act play Die Medaille, set in Dachau which was premiered at Munich's Residence Theatre. The play was also staged in Berlin; Thoma accompanied the production at Überbrettl there in November 1901.

In 1898, Thoma met a woman whom he never mentioned by name in his diary entries and private letters, but instead described her as "G." or Hohenzollernstraße. (The two met for their assignations in Hohenzollernstraße in Schwabing.) Martin Klaus suspects that his lover, who was married, older than Thoma and (according to his roommate Rothmair) came from the Hungarian upper class, was Kathinka Ganghofer, the wife of Ludwig Ganghofer. Thoma and Ganghofer did not know each other personally at that time; Thoma ended the affair at the end of 1901; he and Ganghofer only met in 1903.

In 1901, Thoma wrote his comedy Die Lokalbahn, which opened on 19 October 1902 (again in the Residence Theatre). Viktoria Pröbstl died in November 1902.

== Material achievements and travel ==
In 1903, Thoma met graphic artist Ignatius Taschner, with whom he soon became close friends. Certainly by the time of his success with the novel Lokalbahn, Thoma had become an important source of income for the publisher. Thoma was rid of his financial worries and indulged in an upper-class lifestyle: together with Albert Langen, he leased a hunting ground in Unterweikertshofen near Dachau, which he had visited repeatedly since 1895. Although Langen paid half the lease, the hunt was primarily used by Thoma. In March and April 1903, he travelled for the first time by bicycle with colleagues from Simplicissimus through Italy to Rome. He wrote the mocking story Der heilige Hies and began to write his first novel Andreas Vöst.

In 1906, Thoma and Hermann Hesse became editors of the magazine März.

== Mockery and condemnation ==
Also in 1906 he was imprisoned because of the satirical poem "On the morality of Preachers in Köln am Rheine" being sentenced to six weeks imprisonment for "insulting members of a social morality organisation", a sentence which he had to serve in Stadelheim Gaol near Munich.

== Marriage to Marion ==
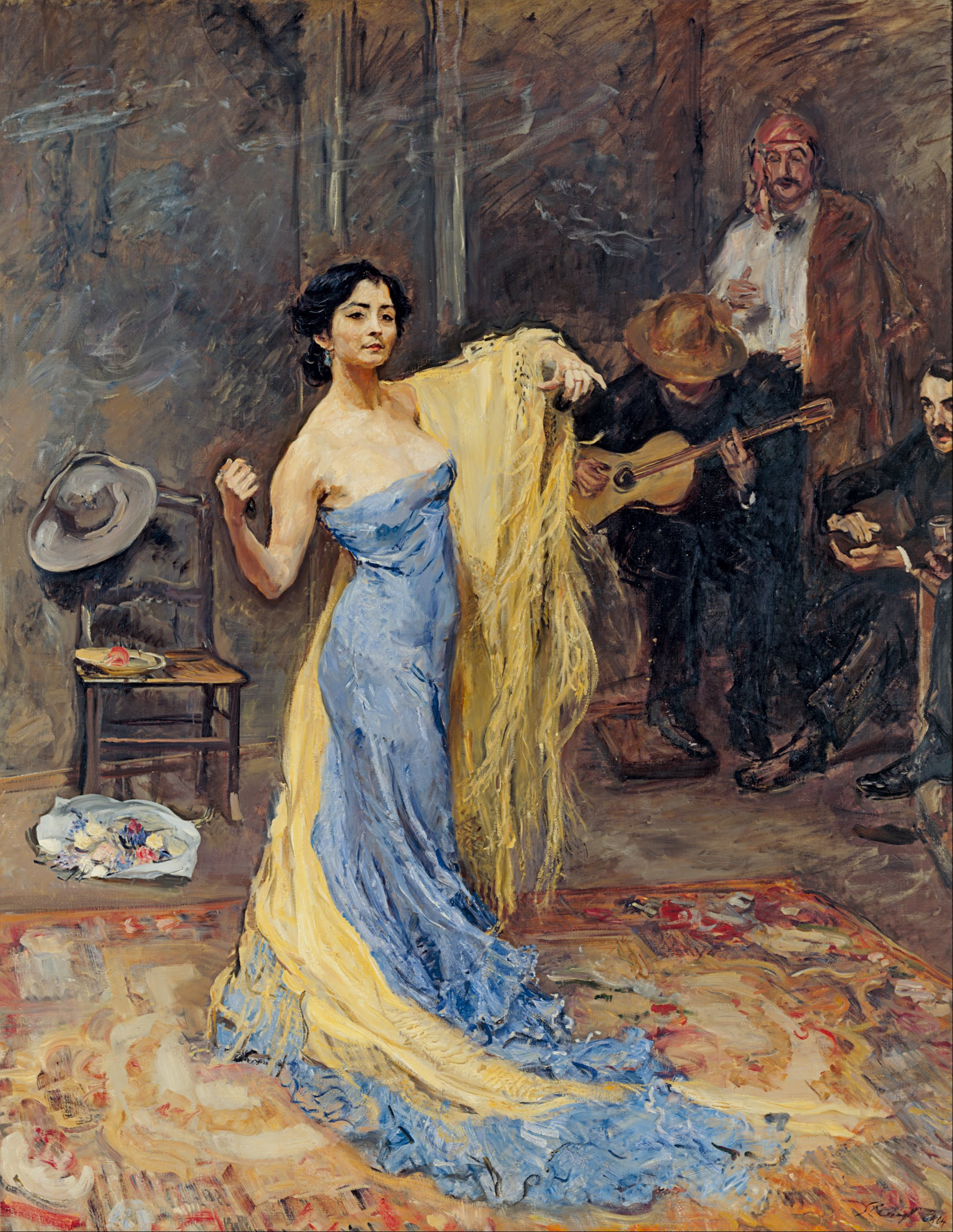
Portrait of the Marietta di Rigardo (1904) by German artist Max Slevogt

In 1907, he married dancer Marietta di Rigardo, known as Marion (1880–1966), who was born in the Philippines and was an emancipated young woman for her time. The marriage didn't last long, the temperaments of the two were too different. Marion became bored and became unfaithful. The marriage ended in divorce in 1911, but the two remained friends.

== At Tegernsee ==
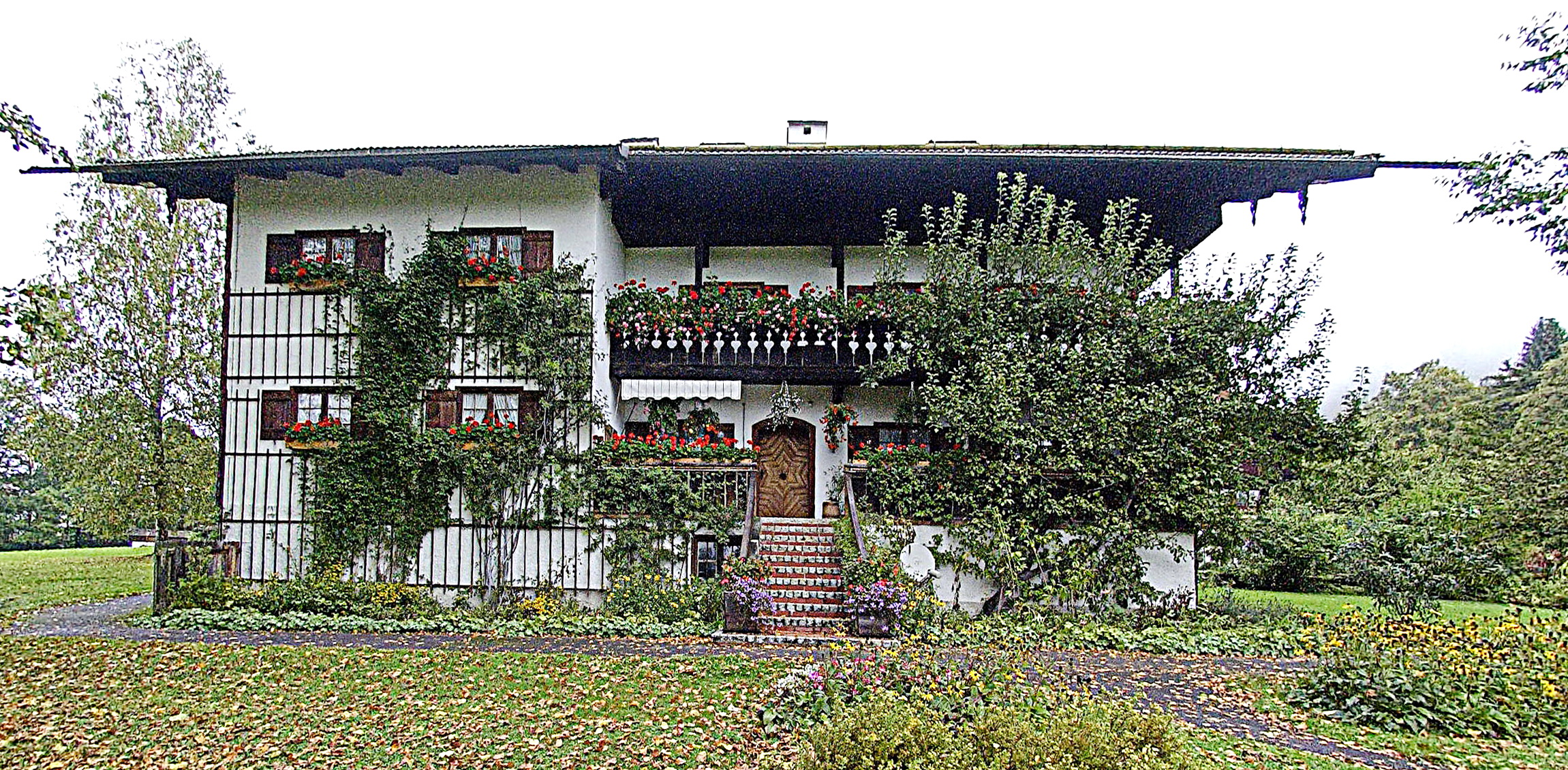
On the Tuften

In 1908, he moved into his house "Auf der Tuften" in Tegernsee. His comedy Moral premiered that year, and the work became one of his greatest successes. In the play he had a representative of a morality association (Sittlichkeitsverein), who had committed a grave offence against the principles of such an association, say: "Being moral, I can manage that alone in my room, but that has no educational value. The main thing is that you publicly profess moral principles. That has a favourable effect on the family, on the state." In the same piece, the chairman of this moral society makes the statement: "Mr. Assessor, when a couple in a marriage stop lying, then they separate."

== First World War ==
Until then, Thomas' attitude had been left-liberal. So he had not held back from often biting criticism of society, church and state. This changed with the beginning of the First World War. Simplicissimus became increasingly less strident, and Thoma could not and did not want to withdraw from the general enthusiasm for the war, especially among intellectuals. He volunteered as a medic and moved in 1915 with a Bavarian Division to the Eastern Front in Galicia. There he became seriously ill with dysentery and became unfit for military service. Many works appeared in the particularly productive year of 1916. In 1917, Thoma advertised in the Miesbacher Anzeiger for subscription to war bonds. "Our fatherland must carry on the war to the victorious end", it said in October 1917 under the headline "Why does the farmer have to subscribe to the war bond?" In July 1917 he enrolled as a member of the German Fatherland Party, which advocated an uncompromising victory. He spoke several times for the Fatherland Party, as in the summer of 1917 in Munich's Löwenbräukeller.

He could not cope with the looming war defeat in November 1918. He no longer understood the world and bitterly withdrew to his house.

In summer of 1918 he met Maidi Liebermann von Wahlendorf (1883–1971), who came from the Jewish sparkling wine dynasty Feist-Belmont and was now married. Thoma fell passionately in love with her and bemoaned his fate for not having taken her as his wife at the time. Until his death he was to court her vigorously. Although she remained close to him, she could not bring herself to move in with him completely, since her husband refused to divorce.

== Articles for the Miesbacher Anzeiger ==
In the last 14 months of his life Thoma wrote for the Miesbacher Anzeiger - often through an editorial on the first page - 175 mostly (except for five cases) anonymous and mostly anti-Semitic articles, especially against the government in Berlin and social democracy. But he also wrote about the Jewish bourgeoisie, for example: "Teiteles Cohn and Isidor Veigelduft, they are still allowed to put their ornate knuckles in their leather cases in summer, with Rebekka on her arm in a dirndl dress, smelling of violets and garlic." He described the Reich capital of Berlin as a "duck dump" and a "combination of a Galician Jewish nest and New York criminal district", described in the language of the Völkisch movement of an "idiosyncracy deeply rooted in race ..." and insulted the Weimar Republic as "characterless idiocy". He called its representative "this sad herd of pigs from Tarnopol and Jaroslau" and emphasized that "besides the Hymie from Promenadenstrasse, we also have shot down several from the tribe of Levi ..." (the Bavarian Prime Minister Kurt Eisner was shot dead in Promenadenstrasse). He called Eisner himself a "Jewish pig", whose murder he described as an "execution".

And Thoma insulted Jewish publisher Rudolf Mosse with the words "Rascal with your curly hair and your progressive motion scissors"; Kurt Tucholsky he denigrated as a "little Galician cripple". (cf. also the reaction Thomas wrote anonymously in the Miesbacher Anzeiger on 2 February 1921 to a contribution by Tucholsky (alias Ignaz Wrobel) in Die Weltbühne). In an article on 16 March 1921, Thoma wrote in the Miesbacher Anzeiger under the title "Broadcast to all Berlin government and Jewish Pigs" with reference to the law passed in the Reichstag for the dissolution of self-defence organizations that had formed after the First World War: "It only needs a Galician Jew to want to disarm us - we'll beat him so that he doesn't fit in a coffin anymore."

According to Luis Markowsky from the Munich Documentation Centre for the History of National Socialism, Thoma "made the crude socially acceptable through a skilful writing style that connected to Nazi propaganda".

== Death and estate ==
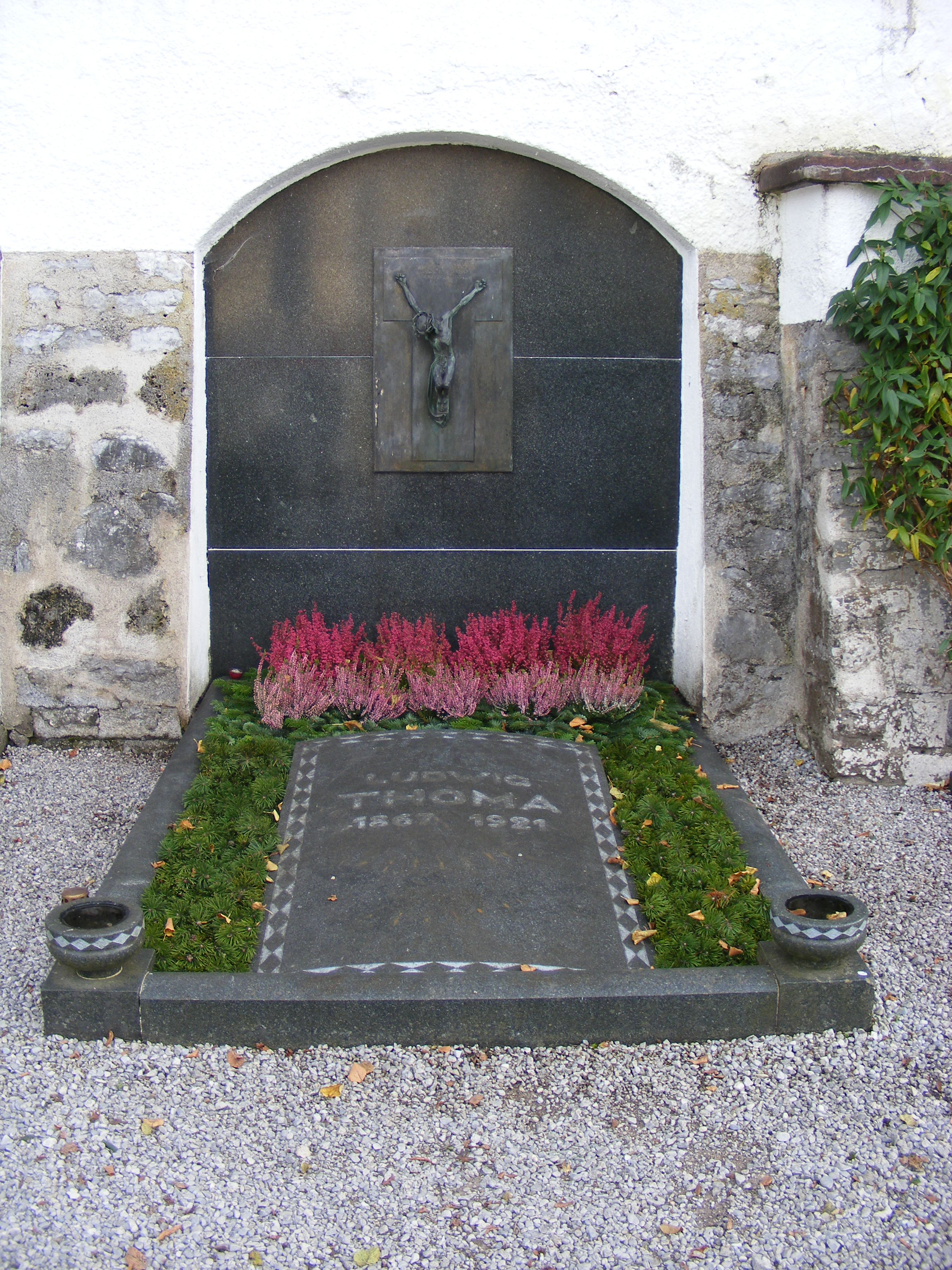
Ludwig Thoma's grave

On 6 August, Thoma underwent a stomach operation in Munich. He died of stomach cancer on 26 August 1921 at his home in Tegernsee. He bequeathed most of his considerable fortune as well as his fees and royalties to Maidi von Liebermann. His divorced wife Marion, his sisters Katharina Hübner and Bertha Zurwesten and his brother Peter Thoma each received a sum of 200,000 marks, the latter also a lifelong pension of 2,000 marks a year.

Ludwig Thoma was buried in the parish cemetery of the Church of St. Lawrence, Egern, in Rottach-Egern by Lake Tegernsee. Today his grave lies between that of his longtime friend, the writer Ludwig Ganghofer, and that of his lover, Maidi von Liebermann.

== Assessment ==
In his works, Ludwig Thoma tried to expose the prevailing pseudo-morality. He also uncompromisingly denounced the weakness and stupidity of the bourgeois milieu and chauvinistic Prussianism with its 'Pickelhaube' militarism. He also resented the provincialism and the clerical politics of his time in the Kingdom of Bavaria, which is reflected in Jozef Filser's Briefwexel. His stories spiced with humour and satire or his one-act plays of the rural and small-town environment in Upper Bavaria are regarded as brilliant. His unsentimental descriptions of agrarian life in his novels are therefore particularly true to life, because Thoma was able to gain a wealth of practical insights into living conditions in the country from his work as a lawyer. The Bavarian dialect is rendered as concisely as that in Georg Queri's works.

Based on his articles in the Miesbacher Anzeiger (1920–1921), a 1989 article in Der Spiegel accused Ludwig Thoma of becoming an angry anti-Semite and to have developed into a pioneer of Hitler.

Lawyer Otto Gritschneder highlights his six-week imprisonment in Munich-Stadelheim (1906) and "the extremely anti-Semitic and vulgar anti-democratic essays by Thoma's from the last years of his life in the Miesbacher Anzeiger" as dark episodes in Ludwig Thoma's life. He also points out that Thoma never submitted his doctoral thesis, but still called himself "Doctor Ludwig Thoma" and let himself be called a doctor, which has to be mentioned for an author who is so critical of his fellow human beings.

== Honours ==
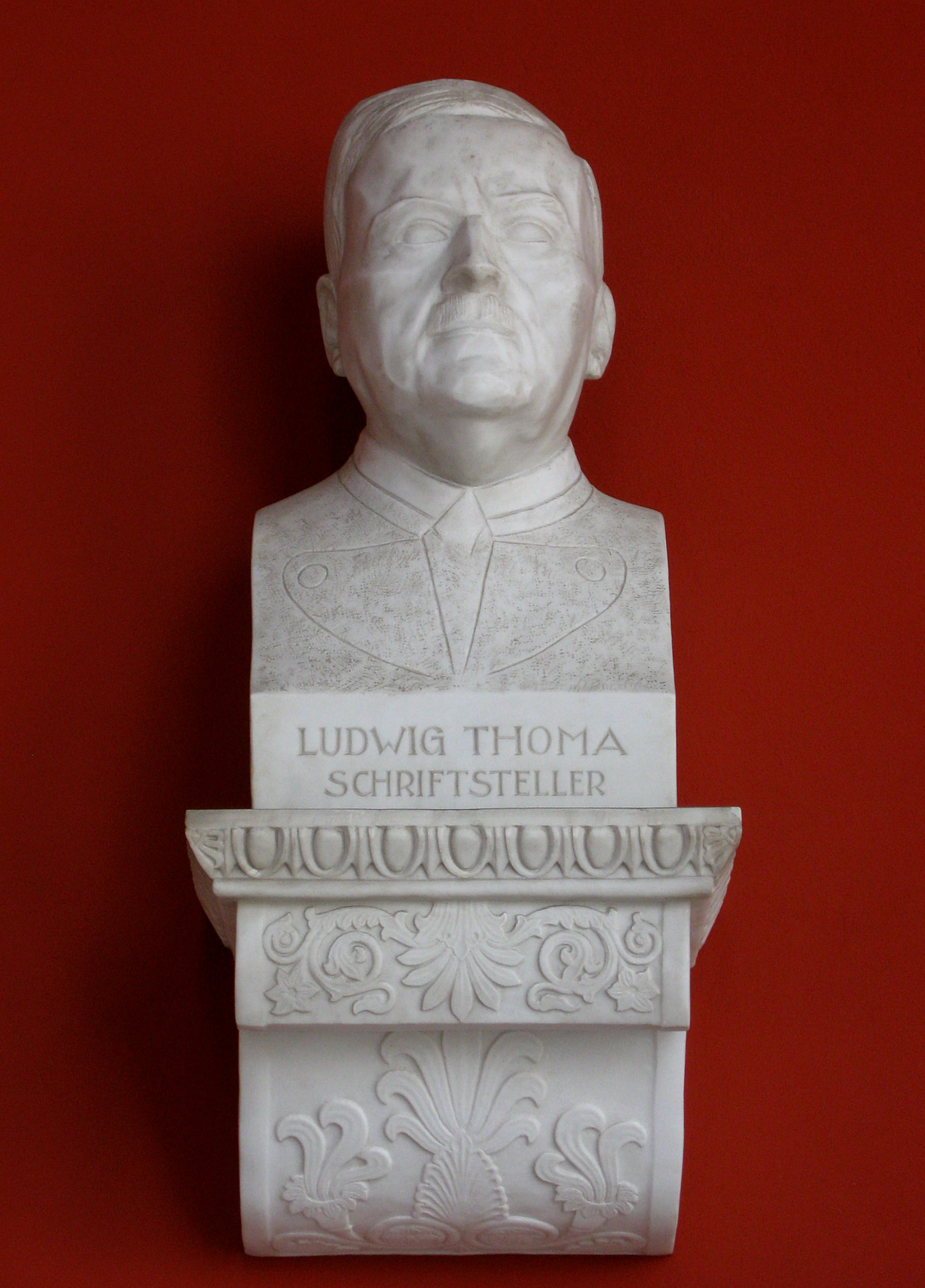
Bust in the Hall of Fame in Munich

Thoma still enjoys great popularity in Upper Bavaria today. For example, products such as the Ludwig-Thoma-Bier from the Hofbrauhaus Berchtesgaden bear his name.

The municipal Ludwig Thoma Middle School (Realschule) in Munich has borne his name since it was built in 1973. In Dachau there is a Ludwig Thoma School (primary school). In Prien am Chiemsee there is the Ludwig Thoma Grammar School (Gymnasium) in Prien in the restaurant where Thoma and his mother lived from 1876. There is also a Ludwig Thoma Primary School in Traunstein. The Dachau–Altomünster railway is also known as the Ludwig-Thoma-Bahn.

His bust is in the Hall of Fame in Munich.

The city of Munich awarded a Ludwig Thoma Medal in his honour from 1967 onwards, but the award was discontinued in 1990 after his national conservative attitude, anti-Semitic slogans and anti-socialist polemics became known.

== Works ==
- Die Lokalbahn (1901)
- Lausbubengeschichten (1905)
- Andreas Vöst (1906)
- Tante Frieda (1907)
- Moral (1909)
- Ein Münchner im Himmel (1911)
- Jozef Filsers Briefwexel (1912)
- Altaich (1918)
- Münchnerinnen (1919)
- Der Jagerloisl (1921)
