= Monta Kroma =

Latvian writer

- Born: Monta Apse; February 27, 1919 Jelgava, Latvia
- Died: July 25, 1994 (aged 75) Riga, Latvia
- Genre: Modernism
- Notable works: Lūpas. Tu. Lūpas. Es.

Monta Kroma (February 27, 1919 – July 25, 1994) was a Latvian writer, best known for her pioneering modernist poetry. She is considered one of the most influential 20th-century Latvian poets, and one of the most unusual and radical of the Soviet era.

Having enlisted in the Red Army during World War II, Kroma initially wrote patriotic socialist realist verse, but she eventually transitioned into avant-garde free verse poetry, most notably in her 1970 collection Lūpas. Tu. Lūpas. Es.

== Early life ==
Monta Kroma was born Monta Apse in Jelgava in 1919. Shortly after her birth, the family moved to live in Riga, where her father worked as a tailor. Both of her parents died when she was still young: her father in 1920 and her mother in 1936.

She was then raised by her classmate's mother, Montu Kromu, who was an active Communist Party member. This experience had a significant influence on Kroma's early ideology and work. In February 1940 she herself became a member of the then-illegal Latvian Communist Party. She was also briefly married to fellow communist Kārli Kromu in 1939. In this period, she supported herself by working in a chemistry laboratory and as a bus ticket-seller.

In 1941, as World War II reached Latvia, she volunteered to join the Red Army, serving as a nurse and working on communications for the Latvian Rifle Division. She then spent 1944–1945 in Moscow, studying journalism at a Communist Party school. She would later study at a party school in Riga, followed by Pēteris Stučka Latvian State University in the early 1960s.

== Writing ==
=== Socialist realism ===
Kroma's first published work was the poem "Paēnā puķes un bērziņi dzīvo..." in the newspaper Jaunākās Ziņas. She went on to publish poetry in newspapers including Literatūra un Māksla, Padomju Jaunatne, and Cīņa, as well as such magazines as Bērnība, Karogs, and Zvaigzne. During her early writing career, she also worked at the publications Cīņa and Padomju Latvijas Sieviete.

Her early literary work can be characterized as socialist realism, featuring effusive praise of the Red Army and life in the Soviet Union. Her first book of poems, Svinīgais solījums, was published in 1947, a tribute to the Young Pioneers aimed at children. This was followed three years later by Tev, gvard!, a similarly patriotic collection of autobiographical verse.

In 1956, she collaborated with the Russian writer Boris Burlak on a book of impressions of Kazakhstan's untouched landscapes titled Neskarto zemju plašumos, one of the first Soviet-era Latvian travelogues.

Kroma's 1959 poetry collection Tālo apvāršņu zemē marked the end of her socialist realist period.

=== Modernism ===
Beginning in the 1960s, as Kroma traveled to Moscow to study at the Gorky Institute of World Literature, her work took a radical turn, and she is best known for her modernist poetry of this period up into the 1980s. She is known for writing about the emotional lives of women in modern cities, employing an avant-garde, free verse style. The urban setting of her work set it apart from the nature-oriented poetry of many of her contemporaries in Latvia. Kroma is considered to be among the most influential Latvian poets of the 20th century.

Her first collection after her turn away from the Soviet-mandated poetry style was 1966's Tuvplānā, followed by the influential—and controversial—Lūpas. Tu. Lūpas. Es. in 1970. Considered by some critics to be her best book, Lūpas. Tu. Lūpas. Es. used free verse to express sexuality, drawing both praise and criticism.

Kroma's 1979 collection Refrēni ("Refrains") won the Poetry Days Festival Award in 1980. She then won the Ojārs Vācietis Award for her poetry in 1984. The following year, she was given the Rainis Award, with the judges lauding her depiction of urban life.

Her work in the 1980s was marked by a turn away from polyphonic poetry, toward shorter works. A lifelong communist, she appeared to reassess her political views during the third Latvian National Awakening, and she worked to document Latvian society during the Singing Revolution.

Throughout her literary career, she also translated writing from Russian, Romanian, and Hungarian, including work by Magda Isanos, Samuil Marshak, Natalia Zabila, Mikhail Svetlov, and Fyodor Tyutchev. She was also a fiction editor at the publishing house Liesma from 1968 to 1974.

Kroma died in Riga in 1994. Her final collection, Jānis, was published posthumously in 2001, followed by Trotuārs, a collection of her poetry from 1959 to 1993, in 2019.

== Selected works ==
- Svinīgais solījums (1947)
- Tev, gvard! (1950)
- Neskarto zemju plašumos (1956)
- Tālo apvāršņu zemē (1959)
- Tuvplānā (1966)
- Lūpas. Tu. Lūpas. Es. (1970)
- Skaņas nospiedums (1975)
- Refrēni (1979)
- Stāvā jūrā (1982)
- Monta (1985)
- Citi veidi (1988)
- Esmu (1989)
- Jānis (posthumous, 2001)
- Trotuārs (posthumous, 2019)
