= Kurts Fridrihsons =

Latvian artist

Kurts Heinrihs Fridrihsons
- Born: 7 September 1911; Riga, Russian Empire, (Now Latvia)
- Died: 31 January 1991 (aged 79); Riga, Latvian SSR
- Known for: Painting
- Movement: Abstract art

Kurts Heinrihs Fridrihsons (German: Kurt Heinrich Friedrichsohn) was a Latvian painter and illustrator of Baltic German origin.

== Biography ==
Kurts Fridrihsons was born in Riga on September 7, 1911, as a son of winemaker Johans Fridrihsons and his wife Helena. During the First World war his family went to Katerynoslav but returned to Latvia already in 1918. Raised in a German-speaking family, he graduated Riga City German gymnasium in 1929. He studied architecture at the University of Latvia from 1931 until 1938 however he never graduated. At the same time he took painting lessons at the workshop of Vilhelms Purvītis. In 1938 he went to Paris, where he studied under André Derain.

From 1938 until 1941 Fridrihsons worked at the foreign literature department of the bookstore Valters un Rapa. During the Second World War, unlike most Baltic Germans, he stayed in Latvia and worked at the Museum of the History of Riga and Navigation. He married Zenta Dedze in 1942. A year later, Fridrihsons was conscripted into Latvian Legion where he served as a war rapporteur. He deserted from the army in October 1944.

After the war he worked as a teacher of painting in the J. Rozentāls Riga Art school until 1948.

During second half of the 1940s, Fridrihsons attended meetings of Latvian intellectuals later nicknamed the "French Group" by the Soviet authorities, which was in actuality an informal union of artists and poets united by an interest in Western literature and art. In 1951, Fridrihsons and twelve other members of the alleged group were put on trial after alleged support for the anti-Soviet sentiments of the André Gide story Retour de l'U.R.S.S. Fridrihsons was sentenced to 25 years of imprisonment, which he served across several gulag camps in the Omsk Oblast. After the death of Joseph Stalin, a number of Latvian political deportees were partially rehabilitated, including Fridrihsons, who was formally released in 1956 and returned to Latvia. He was fully rehabilitated in 1991.

Later in life, Fridrihsons illustrated many books, worked as a stage designer for Daile Theater and painted. He was a member of The Artists Union of Latvia since 1946. In 1989 Fridrihsons was granted the title of an Honoured Art Worker of the Latvian SSR.

Kurts Fridrihsons died in Riga on 31 January 1991. He was buried in the Riga Forest Cemetery.

== Art ==
Kurts Fridrihsons is known as one of the most exquisite draughtsman in the second half of 20th century Latvia. His most preferred technique was watercolour and later felt-tip pen. Main themes of his art was Latvian folklore, ancient legends, literature and art of the world. In 1960s, he was called an abstractionist. Later he intensified metaphorically imaginative accent, exquisite colouring and elegance of a line. Since 1974 he mostly worked in felt-tip pen technique.

Fridrihsons participated in the exhibitions since 1932, however his first solo exhibition was held in 1939 in Honolulu, United States.
