= Ingmāra Balode =

Latvian poet and translator

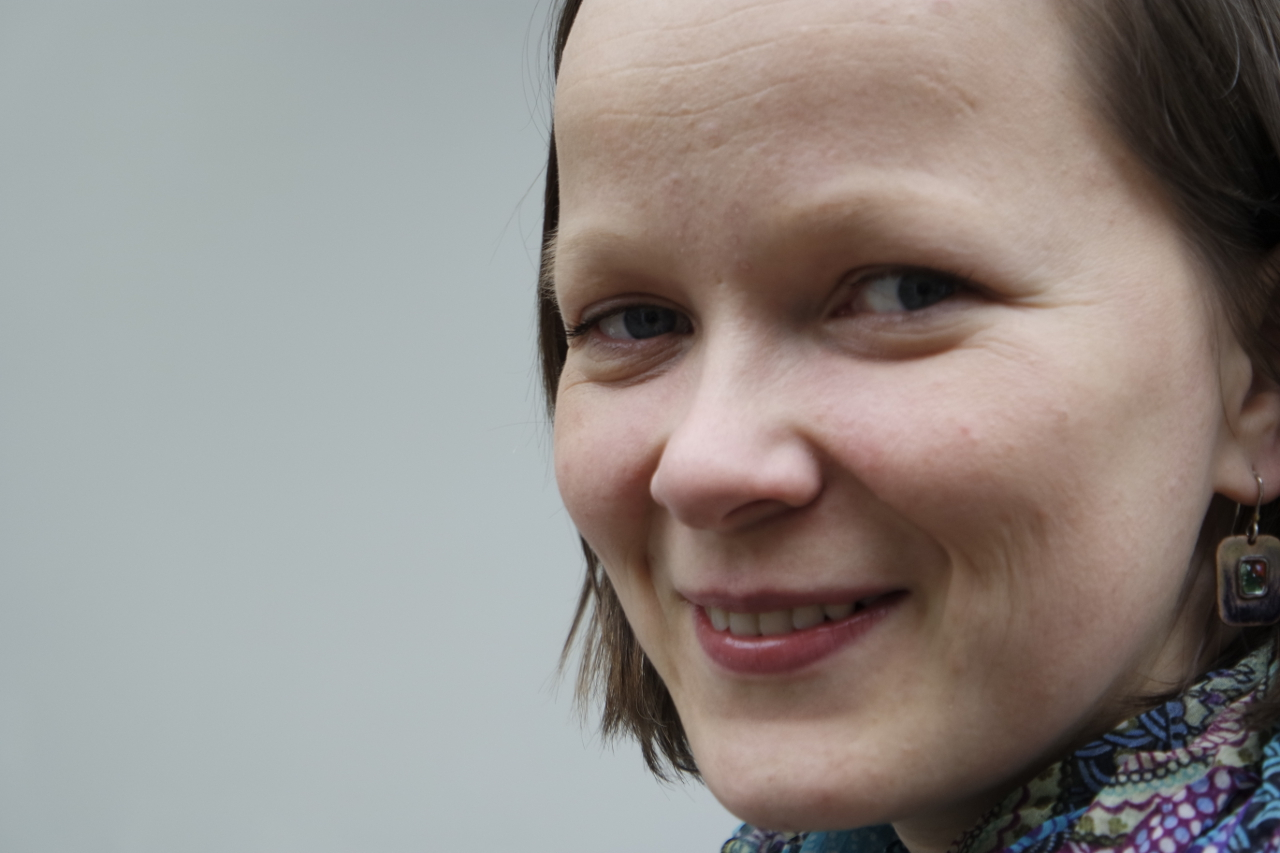
- Born: January 29, 1981 (age 45); Auce, Latvian SSR, Soviet Union (Now Latvia)
- Occupations: Poet, translator
- Years active: 1999–present

Ingmāra Balode (born 1981 in Auce, Latvia), is a Latvian poet and translator.

== Biography ==
A graduate of the Riga School of Applied Arts (Rīgas Lietišķās mākslas koledža), she holds a bachelor's and master's degree from the Latvian Academy of Culture, where she is currently working on her PhD. From 2006 to 2011 she worked as an editor for the cultural portal 1/4 Satori and since 2012 for the publishing house Mansards.

== Selected works ==
=== Poetry ===
- Ledenes, ar kurām var sagriezt mēli (2007)
- alba (2012)
