= Velta Toma =

Latvian poet

Velta Toma (31 January 1912 – 26 April 1999) was a Latvian poet and an honorary member of the Latvian Academy of Sciences. She also used the pen name Velta Pavasara (literally Velta Spring).

== Biography ==
Born in Nereta in the south of Latvia, Toma attended the local primary school and the secondary school in Jēkabpils before studying at the Zeltmata School of Latvian Drama. She started writing poetry while still at secondary school. Her first published poem Jūlija vakaros (July Evening) appeared in the newspaper Jaunākās ziņas in 1936 but her first collection Minējums (Guess) was not published until 1943. It covers the same themes as her later work: life and death, family roots, longing for love and a sense of local belonging. Toma's work is indeed closely associated with patriotism and later the sadness of exile. Another constant concern in Toma's poetry is the place of women, characterized by deep sensitivity but also with a woman's sense of mission.

In 1944, Toma emigrated first to Germany and then to Canada where she would spend the next 50 years. She continued writing and publishing poetry in Canada with Latvieša sieva (Latvian Wife, 1946), followed by several other collections until her last work Aizejot, atnākot (Leaving, Returning) which she wrote shortly before her death. She died in Toronto on 26 April 1999 but was buried in her home town of Neretā, Latvia.

While in Canada, she did much to help Latvian exiles and to promote Latvian culture. In 1995, she was honoured with the Order of the Three Stars.

== Works ==
- Minējums (1943)
- Latvieša sieva (1946)
- Sēļuzemes sestdiena (1953)
- Vēl (1959)
- Mūžīgā spēle (1960)
- Aldaune (1960)
- Dziļumā jāpārtop (1963)
- Sērdienes spēks (1969)
- Pēc uguns (1975)
- Maize no mājām (1980)
