= Maria Holm =

Latvian poet and writer

Maria Holm (1845, Riga – 1912) was a Latvian poet and writer.

Her works included:

- Lustspiele, Novellen, Romane, u. a. "Thomas Kerkhoven" (1906, 1918);
- übers. aus d. Russ.; "Farbiger Abglanz",
- Erinn. an L. Thoma, M. Dauthendey u. A. Langen (1940); "Ich – kleingeschrieben",
- Heitere Erlebnisse eines Verlegers (1932)
