= Lelde Stumbre =

Latvian dramatist

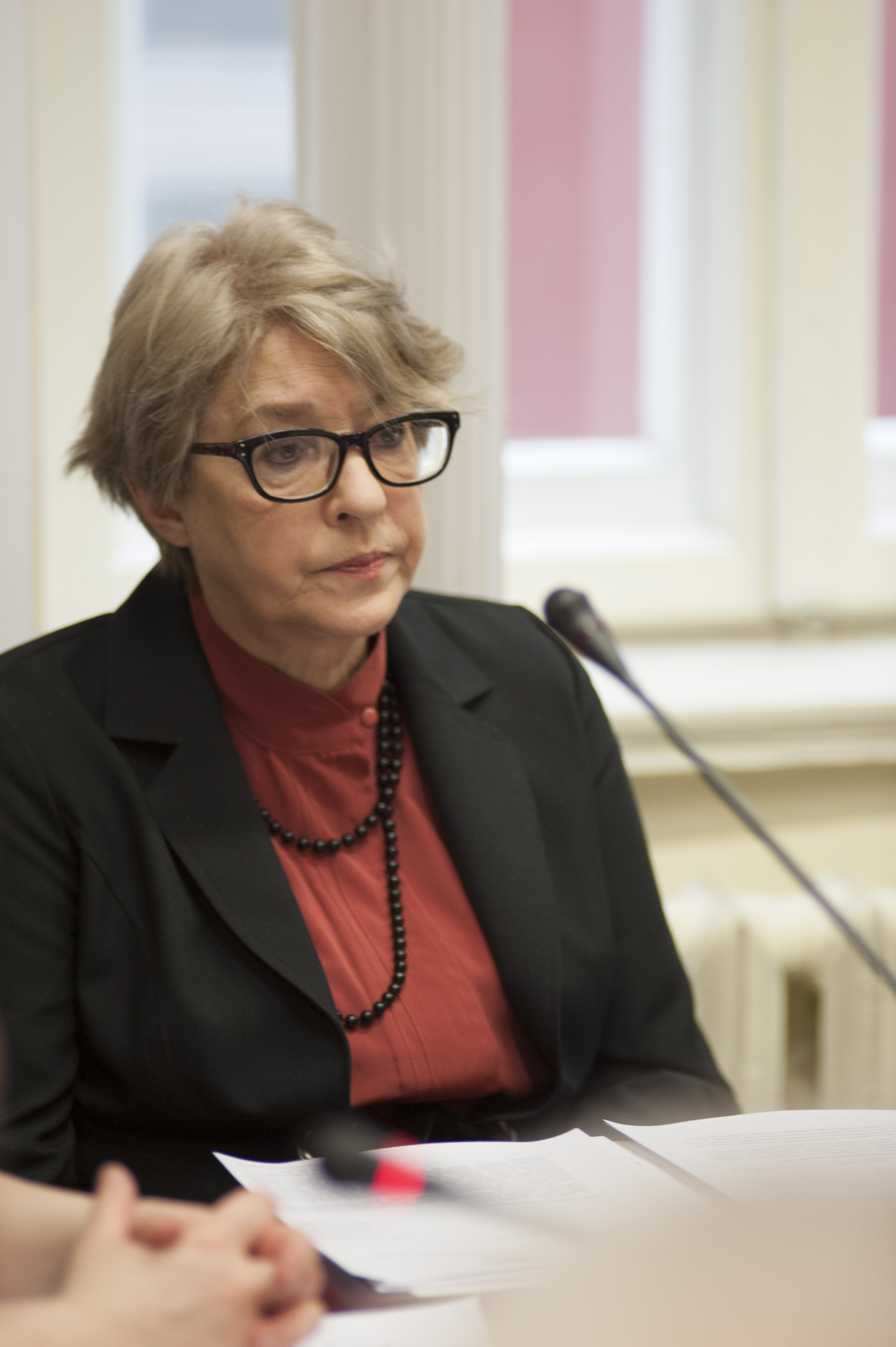
- Born: 30 January 1952 (age 74); Auce, Latvian SSR, Soviet Union
- Occupations: Dramatist, politician
- Years active: 1973–present

Lelde Stumbre (born 30 January 1952) is a Latvian dramatist and politician. Author of many plays, she also wrote the screenplay to Lai tev labi klājas!, a 1995 TV series. She was a candidate for the Latvian parliament in 2011, but finished as the first runner up for her party in the Riga voting region. In 2014 Stumbre briefly served in the Saeima from 30 January to 20 March as a substitute for Einārs Cilinskis.
