= List of women writers (M–Z) =

See also Lists of women writers by nationality.

This is a list of notable women writers.

Abbreviations: b. (born), c. (circa), ch. (children's), col. (columnist), es. (essayist), fl. (flourished), Hc. (Holocaust), mem. (memoirist), non-f. (non-fiction), nv. (novelist), pw. (playwright), wr. (writer), TV (television), YA (young adults')

== M ==
=== Ma–Mc ===
- Rozena Maart (b. 1962, South Africa), poet & fiction wr. in English
- Sharon Maas (b. 1951, Guyana/England), nv.
- Catherine Maberly (1805–1875, Ireland/England), fiction & non-f. wr.
- Lindiwe Mabuza (1938–2021, South Africa), poet & academic
- Aifric Mac Aodha (b. 1979, Ireland), poet
- Dorothy Macardle (1889–1958, Ireland), nv., pw. & historian
- Bridget G. MacCarthy (1904–1993, Ireland), wr. & academic
- Ethna MacCarthy (1903–1959, Ireland), poet & pediatrician
- Mary Stanislaus MacCarthy (1849–1897, Ireland), poet, educator & nun
- Rose Macaulay (1881–1958, England), wr.
- Maria Antonietta Macciocchi (1922–2007, Italy), wr. & politician
- Doireann MacDermott (1923–2024, Ireland), wr. & philologist
- Ann-Marie MacDonald (b. 1958, Canada/Newfoundland), nv., pw. & actor
- Betty MacDonald (1908–1958, United States), wr.
- Charlotte Macdonald (living, New Zealand), historian
- Elizabeth Roberts MacDonald (1864–1922, Canada) poet, ch. wr., ss. wr. & non-f. wr.
- Helen Macdonald (b. 1970, England), wr., naturalist & academic
- Muriel Irwin MacDonald (1867-1918, Canada/United States), non.f. wr., jrnl., ed.
- Lilou Macé (b. 1977, France/United States), wr.
- Mirta Macedo (1939–2012, Uruguay), social wr.
- Gwendolyn MacEwen (1941–1987, Canada/Newfoundland), nv. & poet
- Rebecca Macfie (living, New Zealand), non-f. wr. & col.
- Marjorie Oludhe Macgoye (1928–2015, England/Kenya), poet & nv.
- Ana Maria Machado (b. 1941, Brazil), ch. wr.
- Gilka Machado (1893–1980, Brazil), poet & activist
- Maria Clara Machado (1921–2001, Brazil), pw. & ch. wr.
- Dorothea Macheiner (b. 1943, Austria/Austria-Hungary), nv., poet & pw.
- Elisabeth MacIntyre (1916–2004, Australia), ch. wr.
- Louise Mack (1870–1935, Australia), poet & nv.
- Catherine Julia Mackay (1864–1944, New Zealand), cookery wr.
- Jessie Mackay (1864–1938, New Zealand), poet & animal rights activist
- Margaret Mackay (1802–1887, Scotland), wr. & hymn wr.
- Shena Mackay (b. 1944, Scotland), nv.
- Dorothea Mackellar (1885–1968, Australia), poet & fiction wr.
- Anna Mackenzie (b. 1963, New Zealand), fiction & YA wr.
- Serena Mackesy (b. 1960s, England), nv.
- Mary Mackey (b. 1945, United States), nv., poet & academic
- Mary Mackie (b. early 1940s, England), fiction & non-f. wr.
- Marisa Mackle (b. c. 1973, Ireland), nv. & ch. wr.
- Patricia MacLachlan (1938–2022, United States), ch. nv.
- Mary MacLane (1881–1929, Canada/Newfoundland/United States), wr.
- Hester Maclean (1859–1932, Australia/New Zealand), nursing wr. & autobiographer
- Charlotte MacLeod (1922–2005, Canada/Newfoundland/United States), nv. & mystery wr.
- Della Campbell MacLeod (ca. 1884 – ?, United States), fiction & non-f. wr.
- Eleanor MacMahon (1864–1956, Ireland/England), nv.
- Kathleen MacMahon (living, Ireland), wr. & broadcaster
- Sarah Broom Macnaughtan (1864–1916, Scotland), nv.
- Máire MacNeill (1904–1987, Ireland), folklorist
- Debbie Macomber (b. 1948, United States), nv.
- Myra MacPherson (1934–2026, United States), non-f. wr.
- Katharine Sarah Macquoid (1824–1917, England), nv. & travel wr.
- Rina Macrelli (1929–2020, Italy), screenwriter & es.
- Catherine Mary MacSorley (1848–1929, Ireland), YA & religious wr.
- Marie MacSweeney (living, Ireland), poet & fiction wr.
- Okky Madasari (b. 1984, Indonesia), nv., es. & ch. wr.
- Deirdre Madden (b. 1960, Ireland), nv.
- Jane Madders (c. 1909–1990, Britain), non-f. wr.
- Heidrun E. Mader (b. 1977, Germany), non-fiction
- Ruth Mader (b. 1974, Austria/Austria-Hungary), screenwriter
- Naomi Long Madgett (1923–2020, United States), poet
- Malika Madi (b. 1967, Belgium), nv. in French
- Maga Magazinović (1882–1968, Serbia), wr.
- Perihan Mağden (b. 1960, Turkey/Ottoman Empire), nv.
- Audrey Magee (living, Ireland), nv.
- Melba Padilla Maggay (b. 1950, Philippines), wr. & social anthropologist
- Kellie Magnus (b. 1970, Jamaica), ch. & parenting wr.
- Guðrún Kristín Magnúsdóttir (b. 1939, Iceland), ch. & nature wr.
- Þórunn Elfa Magnúsdóttir (1910–1995, Iceland), nv.
- Sindiwe Magona (b. 1943, South Africa), fiction wr. & autobiographer in English
- Nilah Magruder (living, United States), wr.
- Akka Mahadevi (c. 1130–1160, India), poet
- Sabrina Mahfouz (living, England), poet & pw
- Han Mahlsook (한말숙, b. 1931, Korea), nv.
- Bríd Mahon (1922–2008, Ireland), nv. & folklorist
- Florence Mahoney (b. 1929, Gambia), wr. & historian
- Mahsati Ganjavi (c. 1089 – post-1159, Iran/Persia), poet
- Margaret Mahy (1936–2012, New Zealand), ch. & YA wr.
- Circe Maia (b. 1939, Uruguay), poet & es.
- Jennifer Maiden (b. 1949, Australia), poet
- Ruth Maier (1920–1942, Austria/Austria-Hungary), diarist & Hc. victim
- Chantal Maillard (b. 1951, Spain), poet & philosopher
- Ella Maillart (1903–1997, Switzerland), travel wr. in French
- Antonine Maillet (1929–2025, Canada/Newfoundland), nv., pw. & scholar
- Barbara York Main (1929–2019, Australia), arachnologist
- Marie Majerová (1882–1967, Austria/Austria-Hungary/Czechoslovakia/Czech Republic), fiction wr.
- Marianne Majerus (b. 1956, Luxembourg), garden wr.
- Clementina Laura Majocchi (1866–1945, Italy), poet & wr.
- Maria Majocchi (1864–1917, Italy), wr. & poet
- Flóra Majthényi (1837–1915, Hungary), wr. & poet
- Megha Majumdar (b. 1987/1988, India), nv.
- Tilottama Majumdar (b. 1966, India), fiction wr., poet & es.
- Svetlana Makarovič (b. 1939, Yugoslavia/Slovenia), poet & YA wr.
- Jean Said Makdisi (b. 1940, Palestine), non-f. wr.
- Barbara Makhalisa (b. 1949, Zimbabwe), nv. & editor
- Anju Makhija (living, India/Canada/Newfoundland), poet, pw. & col.
- Angela Makholwa (living, South Africa), fiction wr.
- Miyako Maki (牧美也子, b. 1935, Japan), manga creator
- Eudokia Makrembolitissa (c. 1021–1096, Byzantium), poet in Greek & empress
- Desanka Maksimović (1898–1993, Serbia), poet
- Rima Maktabi (b. 1977, Lebanon), col. Ad
- Jennifer Nansubuga Makumbi (b. 1960s, Uganda), fiction wr.
- Ana María Llona Málaga (b. 1936, Peru), poet
- Ezza Agha Malak (b. 1942, Lebanon/France), nv., poet & critic
- Natalia Malakhovskaia (b. 1948, Soviet Union/Austria/Austria-Hungary), feminist wr.
- Battista Malatesta (c. 1384–1448, Italy), poet
- Geneviève-Françoise Randon de Malboissière (1746–1766, France), poet, pw. & naturalist
- Emilie Monson Malcolm (c. 1830–1905, England/New Zealand), domestic wr.
- Wanda Malecka (1800–1860, Poland), poet & nv.
- Rosie Malek-Yonan (b. 1965, Assyria), nv. & actor
- Oriel Malet (Lady Auriel Rosemary Malet Vaughan, 1923–2014, England), nv. & biographer
- Amita Malik (1921–2009, India), critic
- Nicole Malinconi (b. 1946, Belgium), fiction wr. in French
- Gitta Mallasz (1907–1992, Hungary), wr. of dialogues
- Ana Caro de Mallén (1590–1646, Spain), poet & pw.
- Nathalie Mallet (living, Canada/Newfoundland), science fiction & fantasy wr.
- Françoise Mallet-Joris (1930–2016, Belgium), nv. & es. in French
- Heather Mallick (b. 1959, Canada/Newfoundland), col., wr. & lecturer
- Clare Mallory (1913–1991, New Zealand), ch. wr.
- Bodil Malmsten (1944–2016, Sweden), poet & nv.
- Alicia Malone (b. 1981, Australia), non-f. wr.
- Amina Mama (b. 1958, Scotland/Nigeria), social wr.
- Tatiana Mamonova (b. 1943, Soviet Union/Russia), poet & politician
- Angela Manalang-Gloria (1907–1995, Philippines), poet in English
- Becky Manawatu (b. 1982, New Zealand), nv. & col.
- Laura Beatrice Mancini (1821–1969, Italy), poet
- Emily St. John Mandel (b. 1979, Canada/Newfoundland), nv.
- Lisa Mandel (b. 1977, France), comics book wr.
- Zindzi Mandela (1960–2020, South Africa), poet
- Nadezhda Mandelstam (1899–1980, Russia/Soviet Union), mem.
- Jane Mander (1887–1949, New Zealand/England), nv. & col.
- Slavka Maneva (1934–2010, Yugoslavia/North Macedonia), ch. wr. & poet
- Edda Manga (b. 1969, Sweden), historian of ideas
- Richmal Mangnall (1769–1820, England), schoolbook wr.
- Anne Marie Mangor (1781–1865, Denmark), cookery wr.
- Rani Manicka (living, Malaysia/England), nv.
- Salmi Manja (1937–2023, Malaysia), fiction wr.
- Irshad Manji (b. 1968, Uganda/United States), religious wr.
- Delarivier Manley (c. 1670–1724, England), nv., pw. & pamphleteer
- Edna Manley (1900–1987, England/Jamaica), sculptor & diarist
- Rachel Manley (b. 1955, Jamaica/Canada/Newfoundland), poet & fiction wr.
- Alana Mann (fl. 2000s, Australia), wr. on food
- Erika Mann (1905–1969, Germany), wr., screenwriter & actor
- María Emma Mannarelli (b. 1954, Peru), non-f. wr., historian, professor
- Eeva-Liisa Manner (1921–1995, Finland), poet & pw.
- Catherine Gray, Lady Manners (1766–1852, Ireland/England), poet
- Emily Manning (Australie, 1845–1890, Australia), poet & col.
- Mary Manning (1905–1999, Ireland/United States), nv., pw. & critic
- Olivia Manning (1908–1980, England), nv.
- Ruth Manning-Sanders (1886–1988, Wales/England), poet, wr. & ch. wr.
- Kiran Manral (b. 1971, India), nv. & parenting wr.
- Chris Mansell (b. 1953, Australia), poet
- Katherine Mansfield (1888–1923, New Zealand/England), fiction wr.
- Eduarda Mansilla (1834–1892, Argentina), nv., pw. & critic
- Fadhma Aït Mansour (c. 1882–1967, Algeria), poet & singer
- Joyce Mansour (1928–1986, Egypt/France), poet & prose wr.
- Latifa Ben Mansour (b. 1950, Algeria/France), nv., linguist & psychoanalyst
- Alicia Catherine Mant (1788–1869, England/Ireland), ch. wr.
- Lisa Mantchev (living, United States), fantasy nv.
- Hilary Mantel (1952—2022, England), fiction wr., mem. & es.; Wolf Hall
- Réka Mán-Várhegyi (b. 1979, Russia/Hungary), fiction & ch. wr.
- Sarah Ladipo Manyika (b. 1968, Nigeria/England), fiction wr. & es.
- Gianna Manzini (1896–1974, Italy), fiction wr.
- Mokbula Manzoor (1938–2020, India/Bangladesh), nv. & wr.
- Lee Maracle (1950–2021, Canada/Newfoundland), poet, nv. & storyteller
- Carmen Marai (Carmen María Bassa Rodríguez, living, Chile), poet & nv.
- Dacia Maraini (b. 1936, Italy), nv., pw. & poet
- Faustina Maratti (c. 1679–1745, Italy), poet & painter
- Maria Mercè Marçal (1952–1998, Spain), poet & wr. in Catalan
- Jane Marcet (1769–1858, England), salonnière & popular science wr.
- Melina Marchetta (b. 1965, Australia), nv.
- Andrea Marcolongo (b. 1987, Italy), es. & wr.
- Emilie Maresse-Paul (1838–1900, Trinidad), feminist
- Inés Marful (b. 1961, Spain), nv. & literature wr.
- Anna Margolin (1887–1952, Russia/United States), Yiddish poet
- Silvana De Mari (b. 1953, Italy), nv.
- Juliet Marillier (b. 1948, New Zealand/Australia), nv. & YA writer
- Guadalupe Marín (1895–1983, Mexico), nv. & model
- Katarina Marinčič (b. 1968, Slovenia), fiction wr. & literary historian
- Lucrezia Marinella (1571–1653, Italy), poet & wr.
- Alexandra Marinina (b. 1957, Soviet Union/Russia), fiction wr.
- María Mariño (1907–1967, Spain), wr.
- Kamala Markandaya (1924–2004, India), nv.
- Beryl Markham (1902–1986, England/Kenya), aviator & wr.
- Liza Marklund (b. 1962, Sweden), nv.
- Maria Markova (b. 1982, Soviet Union/Russia), poet
- Daphne Marlatt (b. 1942, Canada/Newfoundland), poet
- Olga Marlin (1934–2025, United States/Kenya), autobiographer
- E. Marlitt (1825–1887, Germany), nv.
- Nilgün Marmara (1958–1987, Turkey/Ottoman Empire), poet
- Jeanne Marni (1854–1910, France), nv. & pw.
- Monika Maron (b. 1941, Germany), es. & political wr.
- Leïla Marouane (b. 1960, Algeria/France), nv.
- Ana Marija Marović (1815–1887, Serbia), poet & painter
- Susan Lowndes Marques (1907–1993, England/Portugal), travel wr.
- Anne de Marquets (b. c. 1533–1588, France), poet & nun
- Manuela Antonia Márquez García-Saavedra (1844–1890, Peru), wr., poet
- Paula Contreras Márquez (1911–2008, Spain), nv. & wr.
- Paz Márquez-Benítez (1894–1983, Philippines), fiction wr. & editor
- Ellen Marriage (1865–1946, England), translator
- Janice Marriott (b. 1946, England/New Zealand), ch. & YA wr., poet & gardener
- Ngaio Marsh (1895–1982, New Zealand), mystery wr.
- Selina Tusitala Marsh (b. 1971, New Zealand), poet & academic
- Catherine Marshall (1914–1983, United States), nonfiction & fiction wr.
- Paule Marshall (1929–2019, United States), nv.
- Una Marson (1905–1965, Jamaica), radio producer & poet
- Patricia De Martelaere (1957–2009, Belgium), philosopher & es. in Flemish
- Esperanza Brito de Martí (1932–2007, Mexico), col.
- Catherine Edith Macauley Martin (1847–1937, Australia), nv.
- Faith Martin (living, England), thriller wr.
- Harriet Evans Martin (died 1846, Ireland), nv.
- Harriet Letitia Martin (1801–1891, England/Ireland), nv.
- Mary Letitia Martin (1815–1850, Ireland/Belgium), nv.
- Ros Martin (b. 1960s, England), pw., poet & activist
- Violet Florence Martin (1862–1915, Ireland), co-wr. of fiction
- Agnès Martin-Lugand (b. 1979, France), nv.
- Harriet Martineau (1802–1876, England), nv. & theorist
- Nela Martínez (1912–2004, Ecuador), political wr. & activist
- Sanjuana Martínez (b. 1963, Mexico), social analyst
- Susana Martinez-Conde (b. 1969, Spain), science wr.
- Raquel Martínez-Gómez (b. 1973, Spain/Uruguay), nv.
- Tânia Martins (b. 1957, Brazil), poet
- Moa Martinson (1890–1964, Sweden), nv. & es.
- Kati Marton (b. 1949, Hungary/United States), political wr.
- Olga Martynova (b. 1962, Soviet Union/Germany), poet, es. & nv.
- Margaret Maruani (1954–2022, Tunisia/France), wr.
- Cissy van Marxveldt (1889–1948, Netherlands), ch. wr.
- Barbara Masekela (b. 1941, South Africa), poet & activist in English
- Mohale Mashigo (b. 1983, South Africa), nv. & songwriter in English
- Lebogang Mashile (b. 1979, South Africa), actor, wr. & poet
- Emma Mashinini (1929–2017, South Africa), autobiographer in English & politician
- Dorota Masłowska (b. 1983, Poland), nv. & pw.
- Amelia Gere Mason (1831–1923 United States), es. & author
- Bobbie Ann Mason (b. 1940, United States), fiction wr., es. & critic
- Judi Ann Mason (1955–2009, United States), pw. & screenwriter
- María Josefa Massanés (1811–1887, Spain), poet in Catalan & Spanish
- Janine Massard (b. 1939, Switzerland), fiction & non-f. wr. in French
- Renée Massip (1907–2002, France), nv.
- Ursula Masson (1945–2008, Wales), wr. & academic
- Dada Masiti (c. 1810s–15 July 1919) poet
- Olga Masters (1919–1986, Australia), fiction wr. & col.
- Jenny Mastoraki (b. 1949, Greece), poet & translator
- Ángeles Mastretta (b. 1949, Mexico), fiction wr. & mem.
- Kāterina Mataira (1932–2011, New Zealand), exponent of Maori
- Julijana Matanović (b. 1959, Yugoslavia/Croatia), fiction wr.
- Pilar Mateos (b. 1942, Spain), ch. wr.
- Beverly Matherne (b. 1946, United States), wr. & poet
- Petra Mathers (b. 1945, Germany/United States), ch. wr. & illustrator
- Mary Mathew (1724–1777, Ireland), diarist
- Sarah Mathew (c. 1805–1890, England/New Zealand), diarist
- Peta Mathias (living, New Zealand), food wr.
- Nicole-Claude Mathieu (1937–2014, France), anthropologist & feminist
- Ira Mathur (living, India/Trinidad), journalist, mem.
- Manana Matiashvili (b. 1978, Georgia (Caucasus)), poet & philologist
- Maria Matios (b. 1959, Ukraine), poet & nv.
- Kopano Matlwa (b. 1985, South Africa), nv. in English
- Mara Matočec (1885–1967, Croatia), wr. & poet
- Sanami Matoh (真東砂波, b. 1969, Japan), manga creator
- Chiara Matraini (1515–1604, Italy), poet & prose wr.
- Larisa Matros (b. 1938, Soviet Union/United States), philosopher & fiction wr.
- Nina Matsumoto (b. 1984, Japan/Canada/Newfoundland), cartoonist & nv.
- Temari Matsumoto (松本テマリ, living, Japan), manga creator & illustrator
- Akemi Matsunae (松苗あけみ, b. 1956, Japan), manga creator
- Akimoto Matsuyo (秋元松代, 1911–2001, Japan), pw. & scriptwriter
- Dalene Matthee (1938–2005, South Africa), nv. in English
- Olga Elena Mattei (b. 1933, Puerto Rico/Comoros), poet
- Tina Matthews (b. 1961, New Zealand), ch. & YA wr. & illustrator
- Gill Matthewson (living, New Zealand), wr. on architecture
- Christobel Mattingley (1931–2019, Australia), ch. wr.
- Ellen Mattson (b. 1962, Sweden), fiction wr.
- Ana María Matute (1925–2014, Spain), nv.
- Genoveva Matute (1915–2009, Philippines), fiction wr. in Tagalog
- Caitlín Maude (1941–1982, Ireland), poet & activist
- Mary Fawler Maude (1819–1913, England), religious wr. & hymn wr.
- Neža Maurer (1930–2025, Yugoslavia/Slovenia), poet & ch. & YA writer
- Daphne du Maurier (1907–1989, England), fiction wr.
- Zenta Mauriņa (1897–1978, Latvia), biographer & fiction wr. in Latvian & German
- Novella Matveyeva (1934–2016, Soviet Union/Russia), poet, screenwriter & pw.
- Vera Matveyeva (1945–1976, Soviet Union), poet & songwriter*
- Sophie Dora Spicer Maude (1854–?, United Kingdom), wr. & nv.
- Constantia Maxwell (1886–1962, Ireland), historian & academic
- Marina Ama Omowale Maxwell (living, Trinidad), pw. & poet
- Megan Maxwell (b. 1965, Spain), romance nv.
- Julia Harris May (1833–1912, United States), poet
- Muriel May (1897–1982, New Zealand), wr.
- Patricia Mayayo (b. 1967, Spain), non-f. wr.
- Jane Mayhall (1918–2009, United States), poet
- Katherine Mayfield (b. 1958, United States), non-f. wr.
- Antonia Maymón (1881–1959, Spain), anarchist wr. & nv.
- Olga Maynard (1913–1994, Brazil/United States), non-f. wr.
- Cath Mayo (living, New Zealand), fiction, ch. & YA wr. & musician
- DeBarra Mayo (b. 1953, United States), fitness wr.
- Eleanor Mayo (1920–1981, United States), nv.
- Rosa Mayreder (1858–1938, Austria/Austria-Hungary), feminist wr.
- Friederike Mayröcker (1924–2021, Austria/Austria-Hungary), poet & pw.
- Katarina Mazetti (1944–2025, Sweden), wr.
- Alice La Mazière (1880–1962, France), non-f. wr.
- Margaret Mazzantini (b. 1961, Italy), wr. & actor
- Melania Mazzucco (b. 1966, Italy), screenwriter & nv.
- Penda Mbow (b. 1955, Senegal), historian & activist
- Rose Mbowa (1943–1999, Uganda), pw. & academic
- Imbolo Mbue (b. 1981, Cameroon), fiction wr.
- Mary Rootes Thornton McAboy (1815–1892, United States), poet
- Constance Jane McAdam (Constance Clyde, 1872–1951, Australia), wr. & suffragette
- Rachel McAlpine (b. 1940, New Zealand), poet, pw. & nv.
- Maxine McArthur (b. 1962, Australia), science fiction wr.
- Joan McBreen (b. 1947, Ireland), poet
- Bunny McBride (b. 1950, United States), wr. & anthropologist
- Eimear McBride (b. 1976, Ireland), nv.
- Kate McCabe (living, Ireland), nv.
- Lida Rose McCabe (1865–1938, United States), author, journalist, lecturer
- Nell McCafferty (b. 1944, Ireland), pw. & campaigner
- Anne McCaffrey (1926–2011, United States), science fiction nv.
- Felicity McCall (living, Ireland), nv., pw. & non-f. wr.
- Mary McCallum (b. 1961, Zambia/New Zealand), fiction wr., es. & poet
- Mary McCarthy (1912–1989, United States), nv., critic & mem.
- Mary McCarthy (b. 1946, United States), screenwriter
- Mary McCarthy (1951–2013, Ireland), nv. and critic
- Mary Eunice McCarthy (1899–1969, United States), pw. & screenwriter
- Karen McCarthy Woolf (b. 1966, England), poet
- Sue McCauley (b. 1941, New Zealand), fiction & screenwriter & pw.
- Shirla R. McClain (1935–1997, United States), educator
- Jen McClanaghan (living, United States), poet
- Letitia McClintock (1835–1917, Ireland), nv. & story collector
- Nellie McClung (1873–1951, Canada/Newfoundland), feminist, wr. & activist
- Joanna McClure (b. 1930, United States), poet
- Lyn McConchie (b. 1946, New Zealand), fiction & ch. wr. & poet
- Annie Virginia McCracken (1868–?, United States), ss. wr.
- Elizabeth McCracken (b. 1966, United States), nv. & editor
- Georgiana Huntly McCrae (1804–1890, Australia), diarist & painter
- Sharyn McCrumb (b. 1948, United States), fiction wr.
- Jenny McCudden (living, Ireland), non-f. wr., poet & col.
- Carson McCullers (1917–1967, United States), nv.
- Colleen McCullough (1937–2015, Australia), nv.
- Carolyn McCurdie (b. 1947, England/New Zealand), YA and fiction wr. & poet
- Alice McDermott (b. 1953, United States), fiction wr.
- Mary McDermott (fl. 1832, Ireland), poet
- Mary McDonagh (b. 1849, Ireland/United States), poet
- Mercia MacDermott (1927–2023, England), wr. & historian
- Rosaleen McDonagh (living, Ireland), pw. & activist
- Jill McDonald (1927–1982, New Zealand/England), ch. wr. & illustrator
- Nan McDonald (1921–1974, Australia), poet & editor
- Melanie McFadyean (1950–2023, England), journalist, broadcaster & lecturer
- Ella May McFadyen (1887–1976, Australia), poet & ch. wr.
- Fiona McFarlane (b. 1978, Australia), nv.
- Shona McFarlane (1929–2001, New Zealand), non-f. wr.
- Katharine McGee (America), YA wr.
- Phyllis McGinley (1905–1978, United States), ch. wr. & poet
- Michelle McGrane (b. 1974, Zimbabwe), poet
- Fiona Kelly McGregor (b. 1965, Australia), wr. & artist
- Medbh McGuckian (b. 1950, Northern Ireland), poet
- Maura McHugh (living, Ireland), fiction wr., pw. & screenwriter
- Siobhán McHugh (living, Ireland/Australia), wr. & documentary maker
- Lisa McInerney (b. 1981, Ireland), fiction wr.
- Ami McKay (b. 1968, Canada/Newfoundland), nv. & pw.
- Edith McKay (1891–1963, Australia), fiction wr.
- Suzy McKee Charnas (1939–2023, United States), nv. & short story wr.
- Alecia McKenzie (living, Jamaica), YA wr.
- Elizabeth McKenzie (b. 1958, United States), wr. & editor
- Patricia A. McKillip (1948–2022, United States), science fiction & fantasy wr.
- Tamara McKinley (b. 1948, Australia), nv.
- Mignon McLaughlin (1913–1983, United States), col. & wr.
- Emma McLaughlin (b. 1974, United States), nv.
- Ella N. McLean, Countess Norraikow (1849–1913, Canada), non-f. wr.
- Georgie A. Hulse McLeod (1827–1890, United States), nv. & ss. wr.
- Rosemary McLeod (b. 1949, New Zealand), wr. on domestic skills
- Pauline McLynn (b. 1962, Ireland), author & actor
- Charlotte Elizabeth McManus (1850–1941, Ireland), historian & nv.
- Emily Julian McManus (1865–1918, Canada), poet, author, and educator
- Liz McManus (b. 1947, Ireland), nv. & politician
- Rhyll McMaster (b. 1947, Australia), poet & nv.
- Terry McMillan (b. 1951, United States), nv.
- Linda McNabb (b. 1963, England/New Zealand), ch. & YA writer
- Bertha McNamara (1853–1931, Australia), pamphleteer
- Kit McNaughton (c. 1887–1953, Australia), diarist & nurse
- Donna McNeil (1948, Germany/United States) wr
- Esther Lord McNeill (1812–1907, United States), travel wr.
- Janet McNeill (1907–1994, Ireland/England), nv. & pw.
- Anna McPartlin (b. 1972, Ireland), nv.
- Martha McPhee (b. 1965, United States), nv.
- Cilla McQueen (b. 1949, England/New Zealand), poet
- Dionyse McTair (b. 1950, Trinidad), poet
- Dervla McTiernan (b. 1977, Ireland), crime wr.

=== Me–Mi ===
- Richelle Mead (b. 1976, United States), nv.
- L. T. Meade (1844–1914, Ireland), girls' writer
- Teresa Meana Suárez (b. 1952, Spain), feminist activist, teacher, philologist & non-f. wr.
- Roisin Meaney (b. 1959, Ireland), nv.
- A. Garland Mears (1842–1920, Ireland), nv.
- Gillian Mears (1964–2016, Australia), fiction wr.
- Meavenn (1911–1992, France), poet, nv. & pw. in Breton
- Gwerful Mechain (fl. 1460–1500, Wales), poet
- Mechthild of Magdeburg (c. 1207 – c. 1282–1294, Germany), mystic wr. in Low German
- Marina Ripa di Meana (1941–2018, Italy), nv.
- Irene Mecchi (b. 1949, United States), screenwriter & pw.
- Saint Mechtilde of Hackeb. (1240/1241–1298, Germany), religious wr. in Latin
- Máighréad Medbh (b. 1959, Ireland), wr. & poet
- Elena Medel (b. 1985, Spain), poet
- Nia Medi (living, Wales), nv. & actor
- Susana Medina (b. 1966, England/Spain), wr. in Spanish & English
- Paula Meehan (b. 1955, Ireland), poet & pw.
- C. K. Meena (b. 1957, India), nv. & col.
- Fatima Meer (1928–2010, South Africa), sociologist in English
- Vonne van der Meer (b. 1952, Netherlands), fiction wr. & pw.
- Meera (1498–1556, India), poet & mystic
- K. R. Meera (b. 1970, India), fiction & ch. wr.
- Selma Meerbaum-Eisinger (1924–1942, Romania/Germany), poet
- Mariella Mehr (1947–2022, Switzerland), nv. in French
- Marsha Mehran (1977–2014, Iran/Persia), nv.
- Rama Mehta (1923–1978, India), nv. & sociologist
- Dora van der Meiden-Coolsma (1918–2001, Netherlands), col. & ch. wr.
- Doeschka Meijsing (1947–2012, Netherlands), nv.
- Cecília Meireles (1901–1964, Brazil), wr. & educator
- Isa Meireles (c. 1932–2008, Portugal), ch. wr.
- Elena Arizmendi Mejia (1884–1949, Mexico), wr. & autobiographer
- Tsehay Melaku (b. c. 1952, Ethiopia), nv. in Amharic
- Tamta Melashvili (b. 1979, Georgia (Caucasus)), nv.
- Gaby Melian (b. 1969/1970, Argentina), wr.
- Ekaterine Melikishvili (1854–1928, Georgia (Caucasus)), translator & ch. wr.
- Melinno (fl. 2nd century BC, Ancient Greece), poet
- Anastasia Melnichenko (b. 1984, Ukraine), social wr.
- Rosita Melo (1897–1981, Argentina), poet & composer
- Maile Meloy (b. 1972, United States), fiction wr.
- Jean Meltzer (fl. 2000s), Jewish American wr.
- Marisa Meltzer (fl. 2000s), American writer and columnist
- Pauline Melville (b. 1948, Guyana/England), wr. & actor
- Velma Caldwell Melville (1858–1924, United States), editor & wr.
- Eva Menasse (b. 1970, Austria/Austria-Hungary), nv. & col.
- Rigoberta Menchú (b. 1959, Guatemala), political wr.
- Jane Mendelsohn (b. 1965, United States), wr.
- Charlotte Mendelson (b. 1972, England), nv. & editor
- Concha Méndez (1898–1968, Spain), poet & pw.
- Lucrecia Méndez (b. 1943, Guatemala), academic & critic
- Mariana Cox Méndez (1871–1914, Chile), fiction wr. & es.
- Armine Rhea Mendoza (living, Philippines), nv. in Tagalog
- Juana Belén Gutiérrez de Mendoza (1875–1942, Mexico), activist & poet
- Luisa Carvajal y Mendoza (1566–1614, Spain), religious poet
- Margarita Robles de Mendoza (1896–1954, Mexico), wr. on motherhood
- María Luisa Mendoza (1930–2018, Mexico), nv. & politician
- Susan Mendus (b. 1951, Wales), political philosopher
- Saida Menebhi (1952–1977, Morocco), poet & activist
- Amparo Menendez-Carrion (b. 1949, Uruguay/Ecuador), political wr.
- Maaza Mengiste (b. 1974, Ethiopia/United States), nv.
- Teresa Meniru (1931–1994, Nigeria), YA & ch. wr.
- Indu Menon (b. 1980, India), fiction wr., screenwriter & sociologist
- A. L. Mentxaka (d. 2022, Ireland), modernist scholar
- Wolla Meranda, (1863–1951, Australia), nv.
- Martha Mercader (1926–2010, Argentina), fiction & ch. wr.
- Antonieta Rivas Mercado (1900–1931, Mexico),
- Tununa Mercado (b. 1939, Argentina), fiction wr. & es.
- Sophie Mereau (1770–1806, Germany), nv. & poet
- Courtney Sina Meredith (b. 1986, New Zealand), political wr. & pw.
- Gwen Meredith (1907–2006, Australia), pw., scriptwriter & nv.
- Louisa Meredith (1812–1895, Australia), non-f. wr., poet & nv.
- Edna Merey-Apinda (b. 1976, Gabon), wr.
- Kersti Merilaas (1913–1986, Estonia), poet & ch. wr.
- Marguerite Merington (1875–1951, England/United States), pw. & fiction & non-f. wr.
- Alda Merini (1931–2009, Italy), wr. & poet
- Ana Merino (b. 1971, Spain), poet
- Louise Meriwether (1923–2023, United States), nv. & es.
- Fatema Mernissi (1940–2015, Morocco), sociologist
- Helen Maud Merrill (1865–1943, United States), woman of letters & poet
- Jenny B. Merrill (1854–193b. 19494, United States), educator, non-f. wr.
- Catherine Merriman (living, Wales), fiction wr.
- Nuray Mert (b. 1960, Turkey/Ottoman Empire), political scientist
- Lina Meruane (b. 1970, Chile), wr. & academic
- Sara Mesa (b. 1976, Spain), fiction wr. & poet
- Elizabeth Messenger (1908–1965, New Zealand), cookery wr. & nv.
- Maria Messina (1887–1944, Italy), social wr. & nv.
- Claire Messud (b. 1966, United States), nv. & academic
- Grace Metalious (1924–1964, United States), nv.
- Antigone Metaxa-Krontera (1905–1971, Greece), ch. wr.
- Joan Metelerkamp (b. 1956, South Africa), poet in English
- Ida Mett (1901–1973, Russia/France), political wr.
- Charlotte Mew (1869–1928, England), poet
- Johanne Meyer (1838–1915, Denmark), suffragist & pacifist
- Stephenie Meyer (b. 1973, United States), nv.
- Miriam Meyerhoff (b. 1964, United States/New Zealand), sociolinguist
- Alice Meynell (1847–1922, England), critic & poet
- Esther Meynell (1878–1955, England), wr. & historian
- Isabel Meyrelles (b. 1929, Portugal/France), poet & sculptor
- Malwida von Meysenbug (1816–1903, Germany), political wr. & mem.
- Samar Samir Mezghanni (b. 1988, Tunisia), ch. wr.
- Malika Mezzane (b. 1960), Moroccan poet and novelist
- Nontsizi Mgqwetho (fl. 1920s, South Africa), poet in isiXhosa
- Máire Mhac an tSaoi (1922–2021, Ireland), poet, wr. and scholar
- Gcina Mhlophe (b. 1958, South Africa), storyteller in 4 languages
- Mian Mian (棉棉, b. 1970, China), fiction wr.
- Hanny Michaelis (1922–2007, Netherlands), poet
- Karin Michaëlis (1872–1950, Denmark), fiction & ch. wr. & autobiographer
- Anne Michaels (b. 1958, Canada/Newfoundland), nv. & poet
- Concha Michel (1899–1990, Mexico), pw., songwriter & activist
- Natacha Michel (b. 1941, France), nv. & critic
- Margarita Michelena (1917–1998, Mexico), poet & critic
- Sólrún Michelsen (b. 1948, Faroe Islands), fiction & ch. wr. & poet
- Michitsuna's mother (藤原道綱母, 935–995, Japan), poet
- Veronica Micle (1850–1889, Austria/Austria-Hungary/Romania), poet
- Agnes Miegel (1879–1964, Germany), col., wr. & poet
- Helene Migerka (1867–1928, Austria/Austria-Hungary), poet & prose wr.
- Cécile Miguel (1921–2001, Belgium), poet, pw. & nv. in French
- Annabel Miguelena (b. 1984, Panama), fiction wr.
- Aksinia Mihaylova (b. 1963, Bulgaria), poet & translator
- Jasmina Mihajlović (b. 1960, Serbia), wr. & critic
- Jo Mihaly (1902–1989, Germany), diarist, nv. & dancer
- Mitsukazu Mihara (三原ミツカズ, b. 1970, Japan), manga wr. & artist
- Mira Mihelič (1912–1985, Yugoslavia/Slovenia), nv.
- Ene Mihkelson (1944–2017, Estonia), poet & nv.
- Kato Mikeladze (1878–1942, Georgia (Caucasus)/Soviet Union), commentator
- Marja-Leena Mikkola (b. 1939, Finland), wr.
- Jung Mi-kyung (정미경, 1960–2017, Korea), nv.
- Karlo Mila (b. 1974, New Zealand), poet
- Farzaneh Milani (b. 1947, Iran/Persia/United States), scholar & wr.
- Jana Milčinski (1920–2007, Yugoslavia/Slovenia), science & ch. wr.
- Grace Mildmay (1552–1620, England), diarist
- Dorothy Miles (1931–1993, Wales), poet & activist for deaf
- Josephine Miles (1911–1985, United States), poet & critic
- Leda Mileva (1920–2013, Bulgaria), wr. & diplomat
- Princess Milica of Serbia (c. 1335–1405, Serbia), poet
- Ognjenka Milićević (1927–2008, Serbia), theater wr.
- María del Carmen Millán (1914–1882, Mexico), literature scholar
- Selena Millares (b. 1963, Spain), poet & nv.
- Edna St. Vincent Millay (1892–1950, United States), poet
- Betty Miller (1910–1965, Ireland), fiction & non-f. wr.
- Caroline Pafford Miller (1903–1992, United States), nv.
- Grażyna Miller (1957–2009, Poland/Italy), poet & translator into Italian
- Isabel Miller (1924–1996, United States), nv.
- Dora Richards Miller (1842–1914, United States/England/Denmark), author and educator
- Elizabeth Miller (1878–1961, United States), nv.
- Jeannette Miller (1944, Dominican Republic), poetry, short story, novel.
- Kara Miller (living, Jamaica/England), screenwriter
- Kirsten Miller (b. 1973, United States), nv. in English
- Leslie Adrienne Miller (b. 1956, United States), poet
- Madeline Miller (b. 1978, United States), nv.
- Minnie Myrtle Miller (1842–1882, United States), wr.
- Nellie Burget Miller (1875–1952, United States), poet, non-f. wr., dramatist
- Rebecca Miller (b. 1962, United States), nv. & wr.
- Ruth Miller (1919–1969, South Africa), poet & pw. in English
- Mărgărita Miller-Verghy (1865–1953, Romania), fiction wr.
- Kate Millett (1934–2017, United States), feminist
- Arthenia J. Bates Millican (1920–2012, United States), poet and fiction wr.
- Alice Milligan (1865–1953, Ireland), poet & wr.
- Anna Millikin (1764 – post-1849, Ireland), nv.
- Sarah Millin (1889–1968, South Africa), fiction wr. & autobiographer in English
- J. M. A. Mills (1894–1986, England), wr.
- Lia Mills (living, Ireland), nv.
- Anchee Min (閔安琪, b. 1957, Chile/United States), nv. & memoir wr.
- Denise Mina (b. 1966, Scotland), crime wr. & pw.
- Marijane Minaberri (1926–2017), France/Basque Country, wr.
- Haruka Minami (南かずか, living, Japan), manga creator
- Kanan Minami (水波風南, b. 1979, Japan), manga creator
- Bridget Minamore (b. 1991, England), poet, journalist, critic
- Else Holmelund Minarik (1920–2012, Denmark/United States), ch. wr.
- Marga Minco (1920–2023, Netherlands), wr. & Hc. survivor
- Liliana Díaz Mindurry (b. 1953, Argentina), poet & fiction wr.
- Kazuya Minekura (峰倉かずや, b. 1975, Japan), manga creator
- Guðrún Eva Mínervudóttir (b. 1976, Iceland), nv.
- Laura Mintegi (b. 1955, Spain), nv. & es. in Basque
- Mirabai (c. 1498 – c. 1547, India), poet
- Ana Miranda (b. 1951, Brazil), nv.
- Mir-Jam (1887–1952, Serbia), nv.
- Heidi Safia Mirza (b. 1958, England), non-f. wr.
- Shazia Mirza (living, Pakistan/England), col. & comedian
- Jane Misme (1865–1935, France), col. & feminist
- Jaishree Misra (b. 1961, India/England), nv.
- Gabriela Mistral (Lucila Godoy Alcayaga, 1889–1957, Chile), poet; Nobel Prize in Literature
- Diana Mitchell (1932–2016, Zimbabwe), political wr.
- Dreda Say Mitchell (b. 1965, England), nv. & col.
- Elma Mitchell (1919–2000, Scotland), poet
- Elyne Mitchell (1913–2002, Australia), ch. wr.
- Gladys Mitchell (1901–1983, England), mystery nv.
- Margaret Mitchell (1900–1949, United States), col. & nv.; Gone with the Wind
- Susan Mitchell (b. 1944, United States), poet, es. & translator
- Susan Langstaff Mitchell (1866–1926, Ireland), writer, satirist & poet
- Naomi Mitchison (1897–1999, Scotland), nv. & poet
- Jessica Mitford (1917–1996, England/United States), wr. & rights activist
- Mary Russell Mitford (1787–1855, England), nv. & pw.; Our Village
- Nancy Mitford (1904–1973, England), nv. & correspondent; The Pursuit of Love
- Anna Mitgutsch (born 1948, Austria), fiction wr. & es.
- Antonija Mitrović (living, Serbia/New Zealand), computer scientist
- Mitsukazu Mihara (三原ミツカズ, b. 1970, Japan), manga creator
- Suzue Miuchi (美内すずえ, b. 1951, Japan), manga creator
- Shion Miura (三浦しをん, b. 1976, Japan), nv.
- Kim Mi-wol (김미월, b. 1977, Korea), fiction wr.
- Miyamoto Yuriko (宮本百合子, 1899–1951, Japan), fiction wr., critic & activist
- Minae Mizumura (水村 美苗, b. 1951, Japan/United States), nv., critic & es.
- Hideko Mizuno (水野英子, b. 1939, Japan), manga creator
- Junko Mizuno (水野純子, b. 1973, Japan), manga creator
- Setona Mizushiro (水城せとな, b. 1971, Japan), manga creator

=== Mj–My ===
- Barbara Catharina Mjödh (1738–1776, Finland), poet
- Alice-Leone Moats (1908–1989, Mexico), non-f. wr.
- Azadeh Moaveni (b. 1976, Iran/Persia/United States), wr.
- Janet Mock (b. 1983, United States), wr., rights activist & wr.
- Béláné Mocsáry (1845–1917, Hungary), travel wr.
- Drusilla Modjeska (b. 1946, Australia), wr. & editor
- Moelona (Elizabeth Mary Jones, 1877–1953, Wales), nv., ch. wr. & translator
- Moero or Myro (3rd century BC, Ancient Greece), poet
- Lottie Moggach (living, England), nv.
- Moh Youn-sook (모윤숙, 1910–1999, Korea), poet
- Nadifa Mohamed (b. 1981, Saint Lucia/England), nv.
- Baisali Mohanty (b. 1994, India), wr., col. & dancer
- Elaine Mokhtefi (b. 1928, United States/France), mem. & col.
- Ana María Moix (1947–2014, Spain), poet & fiction wr.
- Tze Ming Mok (莫志明, b. 1978, China/New Zealand), fiction wr. & social commentator
- Malika Mokeddem (b. 1949, Algeria), fiction wr.
- Natalia Molebatsi (living, South Africa), poet in English
- Mary Louisa Molesworth (1839–1921, England), ch. nv.
- Rena Molho (b. 1946, Greece), historian
- Ursule Molinaro (1916–2000, France/United States), fiction wr., pw. & visual artist
- Empar Moliner (b. 1966, Spain), wr. in Catalan
- Grace Mera Molisa (1947–2002, Vanuatu), poet, politician & activist
- Atukuri Molla (1440–1530, India), poet
- Herdis Møllehave (1936–2001, Denmark), wr. & social worker
- Dorothy Molloy (1942–2004, Ireland/Spain), poet, col. & artist
- Frances Molloy (1947–1991, Ireland), fiction wr.
- Marion Molteno (b. 1944, South Africa), nv. & education wr. in English
- Eva Moltesen (1871–1934, Finland/Denmark), fiction & political wr. & lexicographer
- Margareta Momma (1702–1772, Sweden), political wr.
- Lília Momplé (b. 1935, Mozambique), fiction wr.
- María Olivia Mönckeberg (b. 1944, Chile), es. & academic
- Pérrine Moncrieff (1893–1979, England/New Zealand), conservationist & ornithologist
- Patrocinio de Biedma y la Moneda (1858–1927, Spain), poet & nv.
- Aleksandra Monedzhikova (1889–1959, Bulgaria), geographer & historian
- Aja Monet (b. 1987, United States), poet, wr. & activist
- Libuše Moníková (1945–1998, Czechoslovakia/Czech Republic/Germany), wr. in German
- Mary Monck (c. 1677–1715, Ireland/England), poet & beauty
- Beatrice Monroy (b. 1953, Italy), fiction wr. & nv.
- Dolors Monserdà (1845–1919, Spain), poet, pw. & es.
- Pilar Burgués Monserrat (b. 1958, Andorra), fiction wr.
- Lady Mary Wortley Montagu (1689–1762, England), poet, diarist & correspondent
- Hilda Montaire (1922–2004, Philippines), fiction wr. in Cebuana
- Stephanie de Montalk (b. 1945, New Zealand), poet & biographer
- Danila Comastri Montanari (b. 1948, Italy), nv.
- Roza Montazemi (c. 1921–2009, Iran/Persia), cookery wr.
- Dora Montefiore (1851–1933, Australia), poet, autobiographer & suffragist
- Ana Montenegro (1915–2006, Brazil), wr., poet & activist
- Sofía Montenegro (b. 1954, Nicaragua), social researcher
- Mayra Montero (b. 1952, Cuba/Puerto Rico), fiction wr. & col.
- Rosa Montero (b. 1951, Spain), fiction wr.
- Graciela Montes (b. 1947, Argentina), ch. wr. & translator
- Maria Montessori (1870–1952, Italy), education wr.
- Florence Montgomery (1843–1923, England), ch. wr.
- Frances Trego Montgomery (1858 – 1925), American children's book writer
- Lucy Maud Montgomery (1874–1942, Canada/Newfoundland), fiction wr. & poet; Anne of Green Gables
- Ruth Montgomery (1912–2001, United States), nv.
- Selena Montgomery, pseudonym of Stacey Abrams (b. 1973, United States), nv.
- Amy Monticello (b. 1982, United States), es. & non-f. wr.
- Isabelle de Montolieu (1851–1932, Switzerland), nv. in French
- Federica Montseny (1905–1994, Spain), nv. & es.
- María de Montserrat (1913–1995, Uruguay), fiction wr.
- Teresa Wilms Montt (Tebal, 1893–1921, Chile), wr. & poet
- Susanna Moodie (1803–1885, Canada/Newfoundland), diarist, nv. & poet
- Anne Moody (1940–2015, United States), autobiographer
- Moon Chung-hee (문정희, b. 1947, Korea), poet
- Marente de Moor (b. 1972, Netherlands), nv. & col.
- Alison Moore (b. 1971, England), nv.
- C. L. Moore (1911–1987, United States), fantasy wr.
- Lisa Moore (b. 1964, Canada/Newfoundland), fiction wr.
- Lorrie Moore (b. 1957, United States), fiction wr.
- Marianne Moore (1887–1972, United States), poet
- Ruth Moore (1903–1989, United States), fiction wr. & poet
- Elizabeth Moorhead (c. 1865–1955, United States), fiction wr.
- Finola Moorhead (b. 1947, Australia), nv., pw. & poet
- Hortensia von Moos (1659–1715, Switzerland), scholar & medic
- Shani Mootoo (b. 1957, Trinidad/Canada/Newfoundland), wr., artist & video maker
- Magdalena Mora (1952–1981, Mexico), scholar & social wr.
- Terézia Mora (b. 1971, Hungary/Germany), nv. & critic in German
- Barbara Moraff (1939–2024, United States), poet
- Cherrie Moraga (b. 1952), poet, pw. & es.
- Adelaida García Morales (1945–2014, Spain), fiction wr.
- Aurora Levins Morales (b. 1954, Paraguay), es., poet & fiction wr.
- Karly Gaitán Morales (b. 1980, Nicaragua), wr. on film
- María Luz Morales (1889–1980, Spain), wr.
- Jeannie Blackburn Moran (1842–1929, United States), nv.
- Giuliana Morandini (1938–2019, Italy), social wr. & nv.
- Elsa Morante (1912–1985, Italy), nv.
- Maria Moravskaya (1890–1947, Russia/United States), poet & critic
- Ann Moray (1909–1981, Ireland/United States), nv. & singer
- Yolanda Morazzo (1928–2009, Cape Verde), poet
- Marta Morazzoni (b. 1950, Italy), nv.
- Dea Trier Mørch (1941–2001, Denmark), travel & social wr. & artist
- Diana Mordasini (living, Senegal/Switzerland), col.
- Elinor Mordaunt (1872–1942, Australia/England), wr. & traveler
- Pamela Mordecai (b. 1942, Jamaica/Canada/Newfoundland), poet, fiction wr. & scholar
- Hannah More (1745–1833, England), moralist, poet & pw.
- Helga Moreira (b. 1950, Paraguay), poet
- Nancy Morejón (b. 1944, Cuba), poet & es.
- Isabel Morel (1885–?, Chile), wr. & activist
- Mary L. Moreland (1859–1918, United States), minister, evangelist, suffragist, wr.
- María Victoria Moreno (1939–2005, Spain), ch. & YA wr. in Galician
- Virginia R. Moreno (1925–2021, Philippines), poet & pw.
- C. E. Morgan (b. 1976, United States), wr.
- Elaine Morgan (1920–2013, Wales), pw. & anthropologist
- Elena Puw Morgan (1900–1973, Wales), nv. & ch. wr.
- Nicola Morgan (born 1961), nv. & non-f.
- Sydney, Lady Morgan (c. 1781–1859, Ireland/England), nv. & poet
- Erin Morgenstern (b. 1978, United States), artist & nv.
- Irmtraud Morgner (1933–1990, Germany), nv.
- Sally Morgan (b. 1951, Australia), wr. & artist
- Liane Moriarty (b. 1966, Australia), nv.
- Sinead Moriarty (b. c. 1871, Ireland/England), nv.
- Milk Morinaga (森永みるく, living, Japan), manga creator
- Akiko Morishima (森島明子, b. 1973, Japan), manga creator
- Tama Morita (森田たま, 1894–1970, Japan), es.
- Yunna Morits (b. 1937, Soviet Union/Russia), poet & activist
- Yoko Moriwaki (森脇瑤子, 1932–1945, Japan), diarist & Hiroshima victim
- Margarita Morozova (1873–1958, Russia), mem.
- Lisa Morpurgo (1923–1998, Italy), astrologer & nv.
- Isabella di Morra (c. 1520–1545/1546), poet
- Edita Morris (1902–1988, Sweden/United States), fiction wr. & mem.
- Jan Morris (James Morris, 1926–2020, Wales/England), historian & travel wr.
- Mary McGarry Morris (b. 1943, United States), nv.;
- Meaghan Morris (b. 1950, Australia), cultural wr.
- Myra Morris (1893–1966, Australia), poet, nv. & ch. wr.
- Paula Morris (b. 1965, New Zealand), fiction wr.
- Sharon Morris (living, Wales), poet & lecturer
- Toni Morrison (1931–2019, United States), nv., ch. wr.; 1993 Nobel Prize in Literature
- Di Morrissey (b. 1943, Australia), nv.
- Donna Morrissey (b. 1956, Canada/Newfoundland), nv. & screenwriter
- Sinéad Morrissey (b. 1972, Northern Ireland), poet
- Sally Morrison (b. 1946, Australia), biographer & fiction wr.
- Honoré Willsie Morrow (1880–1940, United States), nv., ss. wr.
- Petra Morsbach (b. 1956, Germany), nv.
- Penelope Mortimer (1918–1999, Wales/England), nv.
- Nelle Morton (1905–1987, United States), theologian and rights leader
- Shola Mos-Shogbamimu (b. 1975, England), non-f
- Stefania Mosca (1957–2009, Venezuela), wr.
- Myriam Moscona (b. 1955, Mexico/Canada/Newfoundland), academic & poet in Ladino & Spanish
- Claudia Moscovici (b. 1969, Romania/United States), nv. & critic
- Hannah Moscovitch (b. 1978, Canada/Newfoundland), pw.
- Marie Moser (b. 1948, Canada/Newfoundland), fiction wr.
- Miriam Mosessohn (1839–1920, Russia/Lithuania), Hebraist
- Ottessa Moshfegh (b. 1981, United States), fiction wr. & es.
- Minoo Moshiri (living, Iran/Persia), critic & es.
- Tatyana Moskvina (1958–2022, Soviet Union/Russia), col., nv. & film critic
- Mieke Mosmuller (b. 1951, Netherlands), nv. & physician
- Mary Moss (1864–1914, United States), nv. & es.
- Rose Moss (b. 1937, South Africa/United States), fiction & non-f. wr.
- Sarah Moss (b. 1975, England), wr. & academic
- Thylias Moss (b. 1954, United States), poet, ch. nv. & pw.
- Kate Mosse (b. 1961, England), fiction wr. & broadcaster
- Ahlam Mosteghanemi (b. 1953, Algeria), nv.
- Natasha Mostert (living, South Africa/England), nv.
- Nadežka Mosusova (b. 1928, Serbia), non-f. wr.
- Isabella Motadinyane (1963–2003, South Africa), poet & actor in several languages
- Yukiko Motoya (本谷有希子, b. 1979, Japan), nv. & pw.
- Capucine Motte (b. 1971, Belgium), woman of letters in French
- Chantal Mouffe (b. 1943, Belgium), political theorist in French & English
- Touhfat Mouhtare (living, Comoros), wr.
- Daphne Pochin Mould (1920–2014, England/Ireland), non-f. wr.
- Julia Moulden (b. 1956, Canada/Newfoundland), non-f. wr. & speechwr.
- Jeanine Moulin (1912–1998, Belgium), poet & scholar
- Martha Moulsworth (1577–1646, England), poet & autobiographer
- Maria Lacerda de Moura (1887–1945, Brazil), anarcho-feminist wr.
- Kenizé Mourad (b. 1939, France), nv.
- Teresa Moure (b. 1969, Spain), es., nv. & ch. wr. in Galician
- Doula Mouriki (1934–1991, Greece), art historian
- Granaz Moussavi (b. 1976, Iran/Persia/Australia), poet
- Elizabeth Moutzan-Martinegou (1801–1832, Greece), poet, pw. & economist
- Mary Braidwood Mowle (1827–1857, England/Australia), diarist
- Ana Gloria Moya (1954–2013, Argentina), nv.
- Isabel Moya (1961–2018, Cuba), communications professor
- Esther Moyal (1878–1948, Lebanon), Jewish wr. & feminist
- Elizabeth Moynihan (1929–2023, USA), historian and writer
- Fiona Mozley (b. 1988, England), nv. & medievalist
- Milena Mrazović (1863–1927, Austria/Austria-Hungary/Yugoslavia), wr. in Serbian
- Zorica Mršević (b. 1954, Serbia), wr. on gender rights
- Ingy Mubiayi (b. 1972, Egypt/Italy), wr.
- Cristina Mucci (b. 1949, Argentina), wr.
- Muddupalani (fl. mid-18th century, India), poet & nun
- Chitra Mudgal (b. 1943, India), nv.
- Lisel Mueller (1924–2020, Germany/United States), poet
- Amélia Muge (b. 1952, Mozambique/Portugal), lyricist & singer
- Micere Githae Mugo (1942–2023, Kenya), pw., poet & activist
- Hazel de Silva Mugot (b. 1947, Kenya), nv. & academic
- Nezihe Muhiddin (1889–1958, Turkey/Ottoman Empire), political wr.
- Luise Mühlbach (1814–1873, Germany), nv.
- Hermynia zur Mühlen (1883–1951, Austria/Austria-Hungary/England), nv.
- Doris Mühringer (1920–2009, Austria/Austria-Hungary), poet & fiction & ch. wr.
- Willa Muir (1890–1970, Scotland), wr.
- Hercilia Fernández de Mujía (1860–1929, Bolivia), wr. & poet
- María Josefa Mujía (1812–1888, Bolivia), poet
- Bharati Mukherjee (1940–2017, India/United States), fiction wr.
- Lena Mukhina (1924–1991, Soviet Union), teenage diarist
- Luise Mühlbach (1814–1873, Germany), nv.
- Hermynia zur Mühlen (1883–1951, Austria/Austria-Hungary/England), nv.
- María Mulet (1911–1982, Spain), children's wr & poet
- Kathleen Mulchrone (1895–1973, Ireland), Celtic scholar
- Elisabeth Mulder (1904–1987, Spain), poet & critic
- Lale Müldür (b. 1956, Turkey/Ottoman Empire), poet & fiction wr.
- Wendy Mulford (b. 1941, Wales), poet & feminist
- Clara Mulholland (1849–1934, Ireland), nv., pw., ch. wr.
- Rosa Mulholland (1841–1921, Ireland), nv., poet & pw.
- Val Mulkerns (1925–2018, Ireland), fiction wr. & col.
- Harryette Mullen (b. 1953, United States), poet, fiction wr. & scholar
- Henrietta Müller (1846–1906, Chile/England), activist & theosophist
- Herta Müller (b. 1953, Romania/Germany), nv. & poet; 2009 Nobel Prize in Literature
- Inge Müller (1925–1966, Germany), poet, ch. wr. & radio pw.
- Melissa Müller (b. 1967, Austria/Austria-Hungary), nv. & biographer
- Clare Mulley (b. 1969, England), biographer of notable women
- Sheila Mulloy (1922–2013, Ireland), wr. & historian
- Margaret Mulvihill (b. 1954, Ireland), fiction & non-f. wr.
- Khadija Mumtaz (b. 1955, India), nv., es. & physician
- Hilda Mundy (1912–1980, Bolivia), wr., poet, journalist
- Alina Mungiu-Pippidi (b. 1964, Romania), political wr. & pw.
- Zorica Jevremović Munitić (b. 1948, Serbia), pw. & literary historian
- Estefanía Muñiz (b. 1974, Spain), screenwriter, poet & critic
- Angelina Muñiz-Huberman (b. 1936, Mexico), fiction wr. & poet
- Claudine Muno (b. 1979, Luxembourg), wr.
- Isabel Gómez Muñoz (b. 1959, Chile), poet
- Isabel Muñoz-Caravaca (1838–1915, Spain), education wr.
- Rosabetty Muñoz (b. 1960, Chile), poet & academic
- Alice Munro (1931–2024, Canada/Newfoundland), fiction wr.; 2013 Nobel Prize in Literature
- Johanne Münter (1844–1921, Denmark), wr. & rights activist
- Rose Marie Muraro (1930–2014, Brazil), sociologist & feminist wr.
- Kiyoko Murata (村田喜代子, b. 1945, Japan), fiction wr.
- Sayaka Murata (村田沙耶香, b. 1979, Japan), nv.
- Yuka Murayama (村山由佳, b. 1964, Japan), nv.
- Iris Murdoch (1919–1999, Ireland/England), nv. & philosopher; The Sea, the Sea
- Nina Murdoch (1890–1976, Australia), biographer, travel wr. & poet
- Weronika Murek (b. 1989, Poland), pw., short story wr.
- Mary Noailles Murfree (1850–1922, United States), fiction wr.
- Michela Murgia (b. 1972, Italy), nv.
- Verónica Murguía (b. 1960, Mexico), nv. & ch. wr.
- Anna Murià (1904–2002, Spain), fiction & ch. wr. & es.
- Rosario Murillo (b. 1951, Nicaragua), poet
- Mayumi Muroyama (室山まゆみ, b. 1955, Japan) and Mariko Muroyama (室山真里子, b. 1957, Japan), joint manga creators
- Sallyann J. Murphey (living, England/United States), nv.
- Agnes G. Murphy (1865–1931, Ireland/England), col. & biographer
- C. E. Murphy (b. 1973, United States), wr.
- Dervla Murphy (1931–2022, Ireland), touring cyclist & travel wr.
- Elaine Murphy (living, Ireland), pw.
- Jill Murphy (1949–2021, England), ch. wr. & illustrator
- Kathleen M. Murphy (1879–1963, Ireland), poet
- Margaret Murphy (b. 1959, England), crime wr.
- Maura Murphy (1928–2005, Ireland/England), autobiographer
- Edmée Pardo Murray (b. 1965, Mexico), fiction & ch. wr.
- Ena Murray (1936–2015, South Africa), nv. & poet in Afrikaans
- Nora J Murray (1888–1955, Ireland), poet & schoolteacher
- Pauli Murray (1910–1985, United States), activist, lawyer, poet & mem.
- Sally-Ann Murray (b. 1961, South Africa), poet & nv. in English
- Shirley Murray (1931–2020, New Zealand), hymn wr.
- Joanna Murray-Smith (b. 1962, Australia), pw., screenwriter & nv.
- Sudha Murty (b. 1950, India), wr. & educator
- Eugénie Musayidire (b. 1952, Rwanda/Germany), wr.
- Inga Muscio (b. 1966, United States), wr.
- Susan Musgrave (b. 1951, Canada/Newfoundland), poet & ch. wr.
- Małgorzata Musierowicz (b. 1945, Poland), ch. & YA wr.
- Carol Muske-Dukes (b. 1945, United States), poet, nv. & academic
- Seema Mustafa (b. 1955, India), wr. & politician
- Sugawara no Takasue no musume (菅原孝標女, c. 1008–post-1059, Japan), diarist
- Dagmar von Mutius (1919–2008, Germany), wr.
- Charlotte Mutsaers (b. 1942, Netherlands), wr. & painter
- Margaret Mutu (living, New Zealand), wr. on Maori
- Mwana Kupona (died c. 1865, Kenya), poet
- Beverle Graves Myers (b. 1951, United States), mystery wr.
- Elizabeth Myers (1912–1947, UK), novelist, short story writer
- Agatha Lovisa de la Myle (1724–1787, Germany/Finland), poet & writer in German & Latvian
- Alva Myrdal (1902–1976, Sweden), sociologist

== N ==
=== Na–Ng ===
- Na Hye-sok (나혜석, 1896–1948, Korea), poet, educator & painter
- Asma Nabeel (1970s–2021, Pakistan), screenwriter & poet
- Farida Nabourema (b. 1990, Togo), wr. & activist
- Borbála Nádasdy (b. 1939, Hungary/France), nv. & cookery wr.
- Sofia Nădejde (1856–1946, Romania), fiction wr. & pw.
- Constance Naden (1858–1889, England), poet & philosopher
- Azar Nafisi (b. 1948, Iran/Persia), wr. & academic; Reading Lolita in Tehran
- Ai Nagai (b. 1951, Japan), pw. & director
- Angela Nagle (b. 1984, Ireland), academic & non-f. wr.
- Maria de Naglowska (1883–1936, Russia/Switzerland), poet & occultist
- Beverley Naidoo (b. 1943, South Africa/England), ch. wr.
- Natalya Alexeyevna of Russia (1673–1716, Russia), pw.
- Vera Nazarian (b. 1966, Soviet Union), nv.
- Kishwar Naheed (b. 1940, India/Pakistan), poet & ch. wr.
- Alice Nahon (1896–1933, Belgium), poet in Flemish
- Sarojini Naidu (1879–1949, India), poet & activist
- Anita Nair (b. 1966, India), nv.
- Carolina Nairne (1766–1845, Scotland), songwriter
- Cheng Naishan (程乃珊, 1946–2013, China), fiction & non-f. wr.
- Layal Najib (1983–2006, Lebanon), col. & war victim
- Afsaneh Najmabadi (b. 1946, Iran/Persia), historian & gender theorist
- Marie von Najmajer (1844–1904, Austria/Austria-Hungary), nv., poet & pw.
- Rieko Nakagawa (中川李枝子, b. 1935, Japan), ch. wr.
- Aya Nakahara (中原アヤ, b. 1973, Japan), manga creator
- Kyoko Nakajima (中島京子, b. 1964, Japan), nv. & es.
- Hisaya Nakajo (中条比紗也, b. 1973, J., manga creator
- Hikaru Nakamura (中村光, b. 1984, Japan), manga creator
- Yoshiki Nakamura (仲村佳樹, b. 1969, Japan), manga creator
- Midori Nakano (中野翠, b. 1946, Japan), col. & es.
- Nakatsukasa (中務, 912–991, Japan), poet
- Kei Nakazawa (中沢けい, Japan), fiction wr. & academic
- Bahiyyih Nakhjavani (living, Iran/Persia), nv.
- Anna Nakwaska (1781–1851, Poland), mem., nv. & ch. wr.
- Zofia Nałkowska (1884–1954, Poland), nv. & pw.
- Beverley Nambozo (living, Uganda), poet, fiction wr. & biographer
- Suniti Namjoshi (b. 1941, India), poet & fable wr.
- Glaydah Namukasa (living, Uganda), fiction & YA wr.
- Kiriko Nananan (魚喃キリコ, 1972–2024, Japan), manga creator
- Meera Nanda (b. 1954, India/United States), religious wr. & science historian
- Rebecca Nandwa (living, Kenya), ch. wr.
- Elizabeth Nannestad (b. 1956, New Zealand), poet
- Heo Nanseolheon (허초희, 1563–1589, Korea), poet
- Claire Julie de Nanteuil (1834–1897, France), child wr.
- Elma Napier (1892–1973, Scotland/Dominica), wr. & politician
- Susan Napier (b. 1954, New Zealand), nv.
- Rafaela Chacón Nardi (1926–2001, Cuba), poet & educator
- Ruth Narramore (1923–2010, United States), wr., editor & musician
- Mary Nash (b. 1947, Ireland), historian
- Mary Louise Nash (1826–1896, United States), wr.
- Thirza Nash (1885–1962, South Africa), nv. in English
- Octavia Nasr (b. 1966, Lebanon), col.
- Emily Nasrallah (1931–2018, Lebanon), nv. & ch. wr.
- Taslima Nasrin (b. 1962, India), nv., poet & es.
- Susheila Nasta (b. 1953, England), wr. & editor
- Khurshidbanu Natavan (1832–1897, Azerbaijan), poet in Azerbaijani & Persian
- Badam Natawan (1924–1988, India/Pakistan), wr.
- Sheila Natusch (1926–2017, New Zealand), natural history wr. & illustrator
- Benedikte Naubert (1752–1819, Germany), nv.
- Jerónima Nava y Saavedra (1669–1727, New Kingdom of Granada), autobiographer & Catholic religious
- Marguerite de Navarre (1492–1549, France), poet, pw. & fiction wr.
- Marysa Navarro (1934–2025, Spain), es.
- Ofelia Domínguez Navarro (1894–1976, Cuba), wr. & activist
- Gloria Naylor (1950–2016, United States), nv.
- Sarwat Nazir (living, Pakistan), fiction wr., screenwriter & pw.
- Bongi Ndaba (b. 1972, South Africa), TV wr. & pw. in English
- Marie NDiaye (b. 1967, France), nv. & pw.
- Siphiwe Gloria Ndlovu (b. 1977, Zimbabwe), nv.
- Mariama Ndoye (b. 1953, Senegal/Tunisia), fiction wr.
- Emma Neale (b. 1969, New Zealand), nv. & poet
- Mary Anna Needell (1830–1922, England), nv.
- Barbara Neely (1941–2020, United States), nv.
- Ada Negri (1870–1945, Italy), poet & nv.
- María Negroni (b. 1951, Argentina), poet & wr.
- Samira Negrouche (b. 1988, Algeria), poet, wr. & physician
- Lino Nelisi (b. 1952, Niue/New Zealand), wr. in Pacific languages
- Alice Dunbar Nelson (1875–1935, United States), poet, col. & activist
- Esther Nelson (1810–1843, Isle of Man), poet
- Marina Nemat (b. 1965, Iran/Persia/Canada/Newfoundland), mem.
- Božena Němcová (1820–1862, Austria/Austria-Hungary/Hungary), Czech Revival wr.
- Cristina Nemerovschi (b. 1980, Romania), nv.
- Irène Némirovsky (1903–1942, Ukraine/France), nv.
- Mary Edith Nepean (1876–1960, Wales), nv.
- Salomėja Nėris (1904–1945, Lithuania/Soviet Union), poet
- Adalgisa Nery (1905–1980, Brazil), poet & prose wr.
- E. Nesbit (1858–1924, England), ch. fiction wr.
- Bára Nesvadbová (b. 1975, Czechoslovakia/Czech Republic), wr. & col.
- Guadalupe Nettel (b. 1973, Mexico), fiction wr. & es.
- Friederike Caroline Neuber (1697–1760, Germany), pw. & actor
- Jill Neville (1932–1997, Australia), nv., pw. & poet
- Kate Newmann (b. 1965, Ireland), poet
- Aimee Nezhukumatathil (b. 1974, United States), poet & es.
- Juliana Makuchi Nfah-Abbenyi (living, Cameroon), wr. & academic
- Clara Ng (b. 1973, Indonesia), fiction & ch. wr.
- Lauretta Ngcobo (1931–2015, South Africa), nv. & es. in English
- Wanjiku wa Ngũgĩ (b. 1970s, Kenya), fiction wr. & es.

=== Ni–Nz ===
- Brenda Niall (b. 1930, Australia), biographer & critic
- Cláir Ní Aonghusa (b. 1953, Ireland), nv. & poet
- Colette Nic Aodha (b. 1967, Ireland), poet & wr.
- Giulia Niccolai (1934–2021, Italy), poet & nv.
- Síle Ní Chéileachair (1924–1985, Ireland), fiction wr.
- Dairena Ní Chinnéide (b. 1969, Ireland), poet
- Caitríona Ní Chléirchín (living, Ireland), wr. & academic
- Jill Nicholls (living, England), filmmaker & journalist
- Christine Nicholls (b. 1943, Kenya/England), lexicographer
- Marjory Nicholls (1890–1930, New Zealand), poet & educator
- Grace Nichols (b. 1950, Guyana/England), poet
- Josephine R. Nichols (1838–1897, United States), non-f. wr.
- Amy Nicholson (living, United States), non-f. wr. and film critic
- Joyce Nicholson (1919–2001, Australia), wr.
- Mavis Nicholson (1930–2022, Wales), wr. & broadcaster
- Eibhlín Dubh Ní Chonaill (c. 1743 – c. 1800, Ireland), poet
- Nuala Ní Chonchúir (b. 1970, Ireland), wr. & poet
- Eiléan Ní Chuilleanáin (b. 1942, Ireland), poet & academic
- Annemarie Ní Churreáin (living, Ireland), poet
- Paige Nick (living, South Africa), nv. & col. in English
- Nuala Níc Con Iomaire (died 2010, Ireland), pw., poet & artist
- Nuala Ní Dhomhnaill (b. 1952, Ireland), poet
- Máire Ní Dhonnchadha Dhuibh (c. 1702 – c. 1795, Ireland), poet
- Éilís Ní Dhuibhne (b. 1954, Ireland), fiction wr.
- Ciara Ní É (living, Ireland), poet & wr.
- Lorine Niedecker (1903–1970, United States), poet
- Aīda Niedra (1899–1972, Latvia), nv. & poet
- Marlene van Niekerk (b. 1954, South Africa), nv. in Afrikaans
- Henriette Nielsen (1815–1900, Denmark), pw. & nv.
- Charlotte Niese (1854–1935, Germany), wr. & poet
- Sandra Rodríguez Nieto (living, Mexico), wr. on crime
- Audrey Niffenegger (b. 1963, United States), nv. & artist
- Zehra Nigah (b. 1937, India/Pakistan), poet & scriptwriter
- Nigâr Hanım (1856–1918, Turkey/Ottoman Empire), poet
- Ailbhe Ní Ghearbhuigh (b. 1984, Ireland), poet
- Áine Ní Ghlinn (living, Ireland), poet, pw. & ch. wr.
- Máiréad Ní Ghráda (1896–1971, Ireland), poet & pw.
- Doireann Ní Ghríofa (b. 1981, Ireland), poet
- Sorcha Ní Ghuairim (1911–1976, Ireland), wr. & singer
- Lady Nijō (後深草院二条, 1258–post-1307, Japan), poet & mem.
- Milena Nikolova (b. 1984, Bulgaria), poet & wr.
- Deborah Niland (b. 1950, Australia), ch. wr. & illustrator
- Elly Niland (b. 1954, Guyana/England), poet, pw. & educator
- Máire Bhuí Ní Laoghaire (1774 – c. 1848, Ireland), poet
- Bríd Ní Mhóráin (b. 1951, Ireland), poet
- Jenny Nimmo (b. 1944, Wales), ch. wr. & nv.
- Anaïs Nin (1903–1977, France), eroticist, critic & diarist
- Anupama Niranjana (1934–1991, India), fiction & non-f. wr. & physician
- Ailís Ní Ríain (b. 1974, Ireland), pw. & composer
- Esther Nirina (1932–2004, Malaysia), poet
- Siobhán Ní Shúilleabháin (1928–2013, Ireland), pw. & wr.
- Kanako Nishi (西加奈子, b. 1977, Japan), fiction & ch. wr. & illustrator
- Keiko Nishi (西炯子, b. 1966, Japan), manga creator
- Yoshiko Nishitani (西谷祥子, b. 1943, Japan), manga creator
- Ana María Martínez de Nisser (1812–1872, Comoros), wr. & soldier
- Rosa Nissán (b. 1939, Mexico), wr.
- Niu Yingzhen (8th century, China), poet
- Sister Nivedita (1867–1911, England), wr.
- Ketty Nivyabandi (b. 1978, Burundi), poet & activist
- Marie Nizet (1859–1922, Belgium), poet in French
- Lela B. Njatin (b. 1963, Yugoslavia/Slovenia), fiction wr. & artist
- Rebeka Njau (b. 1932, Kenya), pw. & nv.
- Nkiru Njoku (b. c. 1980, Nigeria), screenwriter
- Michelle Nkamankeng (b. c. 2008, South Africa), nv. in English
- Anna de Noailles (1876–1933, Romania/France), wr. in French
- Ellen Kyle Noel (1815–1873, Ireland/Canada/Newfoundland), nv.
- Noh Cheonmyeong (노천명, 1912–1957, Korea), poet
- Florence Noiville (b. 1961, France), fiction & ch. wr.
- Cynthia Reed Nolan (1908–1976, Australia), nv. & travel wr.
- Ingrid Noll (b. 1935, Germany), nv.
- Oodgeroo Noonuccal (Kath Walker, 1920–1993, Australia), poet, activist & educator
- Saskia Noort (b. 1967, Netherlands), crime wr.
- Kerstin Norborg (b. 1961, Sweden), wr. & poet
- Cecily Norden (1918–2011, South Africa), wr. in English on horse riding
- Hedvig Charlotta Nordenflycht (1718–1763, Sweden), poet & salonnière
- Clara Nordström (1886–1962, Sweden/Germany), nv. in German
- Lise Nørgaard (1917–2023, Denmark), es. & fiction wr.
- Regine Normann (1867–1939, Norway), fiction wr.
- Dagmar Normet (1921–2008, Estonia), wr. & pw.
- Kathleen Norris (1880–1966, United States), nv.
- Marlene Norst (1930–2010, Austria/Austria-Hungary/Australia), linguist & educator
- Marisela Norte (living, United States), poet & wr.
- Gail North-Saunders (b. 1944, Bahamas), historian & archivist
- Andre Norton (1912–2005, United States), fiction wr.
- Caroline Norton (1808–1877, England), wr., reformer & feminist
- Mary E. Norton (1833–1916, United States), nv.
- Morilla M. Norton (1865–1916, United States), non-f. wr. & poet
- Eva Norvind (1944–2006, Norway/Mexico), screenwriter
- Julian of Norwich (1342–1416, England), mystic
- Nossis (fl. c. 300 BC, Ancient Greece), epigrammist & poet
- Christine Nöstlinger (1936–2018, Austria/Austria-Hungary), ch. wr.
- Amélie Nothomb (b. 1966, Belgium), nv. in French
- Alice Notley (b. 1945, United States), poet
- Joanne Nova (living, Australia), science wr. & speaker
- Helga M. Novak (1935–2013, Germany), poet & wr.
- Anna Novakov (b. 1959, Serbia), art historian & critic
- Mary Novik (b. 1945, Canada/Newfoundland), nv.
- Lili Novy (1885–1958, Austria/Austria-Hungary/Yugoslavia), poet in Slovenian
- Perpétue Nshimirimana (b. 1961, Burundi), wr.
- Mpho 'M'atsepo Nthunya (fl. 1990s, Lesotho), autobiographer
- Liz Nugent (b. 1967, Ireland), nv.
- Princess Nukata (額田王, fl. 7th century, Japan), poet
- Elizabeth Nunez (1944–2024, Trinidad/United States), nv. & academic
- Sigrid Nunez (b. 1951, United States), nv. & es.
- Malla Nunn (b. 1963, Australia), nv. & fiction wr.
- Minni Nurme (1917–1994, Estonia), nv. & poet
- Sevinj Nurugizi (b. 1964, Azerbaijan), ch. wr.
- Martina Nwakoby (b. 1937, Nigeria), ch. wr. & nv.
- Flora Nwapa (1931–1993, Nigeria), nv.
- Adaobi Tricia Nwaubani (b. 1976, Nigeria), nv. & es.
- Julia Nyberg (1784–1854, Sweden), poet & songwriter
- Monica Arac de Nyeko (b. 1979, Uganda), fiction wr., poet & es.
- Saigū no Nyōgo (霧賀ユキ, 929–985, Japan), poet
- Colette Nys-Mazure (b. 1939, Belgium), poet & pw. in French
- Carita Nyström (1940–2019, Finland), wr. & poet in Swedish
- Sekai Nzenza (living, Zimbabwe), wr. & critic

== O ==
- Ann Oakley (b. 1944, England), academic & nv.
- Joyce Carol Oates (b. 1938, United States), fiction wr., poet & pw.
- María Olimpia de Obaldía (1891–1985, Panama), poet
- Kathy O'Beirne (1956–2019, Ireland), mem.
- Achy Obejas (b. 1956, Cg), wr. & poet
- Charlotta Öberg (also Lotta Öberg; 1818–1856, Sweden), poet
- Clara Obligado (b. 1950, Argentina), fiction wr.
- Trifonia Melibea Obono (b. 1982, Equatorial Guinea), nv. & political scientist
- Téa Obreht (b. 1985, Serbia/United States), fiction wr.
- Kathleen O'Brennan (1876–1948, Ireland), pw. & activist
- Lily O'Brennan (1878–1948, Ireland), writer, pw. & activist
- Princess Anka Obrenović (1821–1868, Serbia), Serbia's first woman wr.
- Charlotte Grace O'Brien (1845–1909, Ireland), writer, philanthropist & plant collector
- Edna O'Brien (1930–2024, Ireland), fiction wr.
- Frances O'Brien (1840–1883, Ireland), poet & nv.
- Kate O'Brien (1897–1974, Ireland), nv. & pw.
- Mary-Louise O'Callaghan (living, Australia), non-f. wr.
- Silvina Ocampo (1903–1993, Argentina), poet, fiction wr. & pw.
- Victoria Ocampo (1890–1979, Argentina), critic & autobiographer
- Raquel Ochoa (b. 1980, Portugal), nv., biographer & travel wr.
- Helen O'Clery (1910–2006, Ireland), ch. wr.
- Elizabeth O'Conner' (Anne Willard, 1913–2000, Australia), nv.
- Flannery O'Connor (1925–1964, United States), fiction wr.
- Gemma O'Connor (b. 1940, Ireland), mystery wr.
- Niamh O'Connor (fl. since 2000, Ireland), nv. & col.
- Tyne O'Connell (b. 1960, England), nv.
- Asenath Bole Odaga (1937–2014, Kenya), nv., pw. & ch. wr.
- Mary Barry O'Delaney (1862–1947, Ireland), story-teller & poet
- Cristina Odone (b. 1960, Kenya/England), nv. & col.
- Jessie Fremont O'Donnell (1860–1897, United States), wr.
- Martha B. O'Donnell (1836–1925, United States), newspaper and magazine editor and publisher
- Mary O'Donnell (b. 1954, Ireland), nv., poet & educator
- Mietta O'Donnell (1950–2001, Australia), food wr. & chef
- Mary O'Donoghue (b. 1975, Ireland), fiction wr. & poet
- Nannie Lambert Power O'Donoghue (1843–1940, Ireland), poet & wr.
- Irina Odoyevtseva (1895/1901–1990, Soviet Union/Russia), poet, nv. & mem.
- Taiwo Odubiyi (b. 1965, Nigeria), nv. & ch. wr.
- Okwiri Oduor (b. 1988/1989, Kenya), wr.
- Marie Conway Oemler (1879–1932, United States), nv.
- Julia O'Faolain (1932–2020, Ireland/United States), fiction wr.
- Nuala O'Faolain (1940–2008, Ireland), nv., critic & mem.
- Maggie O'Farrell (b. 1972, Northern Ireland/England), nv. & mem.
- Ursula O'Farrell (1934–2022, Ireland), psychologist
- Jenny Offill (b. 1968, United States), nv. & editor
- Catherine O'Flynn (b. 1970, England), fiction wr.
- Nana Oforiatta Ayim (living, Ghana/Gold Coast), wr. & art historian
- Yōko Ogawa (b. 1962, Japan), fiction wr. & es.
- Barbara Ogier (1648–1720, Flanders), pw.
- Anna Ogino (荻野アンナ, b. 1956, Japan), nv. & academic
- Nina Ognianova (living, Bulgaria), activist
- Vida Ognjenović (b. 1941, Serbia), pw. & wr.
- Margaret Ogola (1958–2011, Kenya), nv.
- Grace Ogot (1930–2015, Kenya), fiction wr.
- Molara Ogundipe (1940–2019, Nigeria), poet, critic & non-f. wr.
- P. A. Ogundipe (1927–2020, Nigeria), fiction wr. & mem.
- Birgül Oğuz (b. 1981, Turkey/Ottoman Empire), fiction wr. & academic
- Ellen Oh, (living, United States), author
- Oh Jung-hee (오정희, b. 1947, Korea), fiction wr.
- Oh Soo-yeon (오수연, b. 1964, Korea), fiction wr. & es.
- Sheila O'Hagan (d. 2017, Ireland), poet
- Mariko Ōhara (大原まり子, b. 1959, Japan), science fiction wr.
- Pixie O'Harris (Rhona Olive Harris, 1903–1991, Wales), wr. & artist
- Nanase Ohkawa (大川七瀬, b. 1967, Japan), manga creator
- Jane Ohlmeyer (living, Northern Ireland/Ireland), historian & academic
- Margaret Ó hÓgartaigh (1967–2014, Ireland), historian & biographer
- Shinobu Ohtaka (大高忍, b. 1983, Japan), manga creator
- Liisi Ojamaa (1972–2019, Estonia), poet & critic
- Mirta Ojito (b. 1964, Cuba), wr. & col.
- Yeo Ok (여옥, between 15th & 1st century BC, Korea), poet
- Mari Okada (岡田麿里, b. 1976, Japan), screenwriter & manga creator
- Reiko Okano (岡野 玲子, b. 1960, Japan), manga creator
- Meral Okay (1959–2012, Turkey/Ottoman Empire), screenwriter
- Kyoko Okazaki (岡崎京子, b. 1963, Japan), manga creator
- Adelaide O'Keeffe (1776–1865, Ireland), poet & nv.
- Chioma Okereke (living, Nigeria), poet & fiction wr.
- Susan Moller Okin (1946–2004, New Zealand), political wr.
- Julie Okoh (b. 1947, Nigeria), pw. & educator
- Irenosen Okojie (living, Nigeria/England), fiction wr.
- Nnedi Okorafor (b. 1974, Nigeria/United States), fiction wr.
- Otoniya J. Okot Bitek (b. 1966, Kenya/Uganda), poet
- Ifeoma Okoye (b. c. 1937, Nigeria), fiction & ch. wr.
- Chinelo Okparanta (b. 1981, Nigeria/United States), fiction wr.
- Sofi Oksanen (b. 1977, Finland), nv. & pw.
- Princess Ōku (大来皇女, 661–702, Japan), poet
- Mary Karooro Okurut (b. 1954, Uganda), fiction wr.
- Sevin Okyay (b. 1942, Turkey/Ottoman Empire), critic & col.
- Auður Ava Ólafsdóttir (b. 1958, Iceland), art historian, nv. & poet
- Susana Olaondo (b. 1953, Uruguay), ch. wr. & illustrator
- Sharon Olds (b. 1942, United States), poet
- Annette K. Olesen (b. 1965, Denmark), screenwriter
- Margaret Oliphant (1828–1897, Scotland), nv.
- Ukamaka Olisakwe (b. 1982, Nigeria), fiction & screenwriter
- Gloria Olive (1923–2006, United States/New Zealand), mathematician
- Mary Oliver (1935–2019, United States), poet
- Narelle Oliver (1960–2016), ch. wr. & artist
- Marly de Oliveira (c. 1938–2007, Brazil), poet
- Orlandina de Oliveira (b. 1943, Brazil/Mexico), social critic
- Véronique Olmi (b. 1962, France), pw. & nv.
- Ayodele Olofintuade (living, Nigeria), fiction & ch. wr.
- Blanche Christine Olschak (1913–1989, Austria/Austria-Hungary), encyclopedist
- Tillie Olsen (1913–2007, United States), feminist fiction wr.
- Hagar Olsson (1893–1978, Finland), critic & pw. in Swedish
- Linda Olsson (b. 1948, Sweden/New Zealand), nv. in Swedish & English
- Lisa Olstein (b. 1972, United States), poet
- Gilda Olvidado (b. 1957, Philippines), screenwriter & nv.
- Nessa O'Mahony (living, Ireland), poet and wr.
- Mary O'Malley (b. 1954, Ireland), poet
- Bree O'Mara (1968–2010, South Africa), nv. in English
- Kristín Ómarsdóttir (b. 1962, Iceland), nv., poet & pw.
- Kathleen O'Meara (1839–1888, Ireland), nv. & biographer
- Ghazal Omid (b. c. 1971, Iran/Persia/Canada/Newfoundland), autobiographer
- Rita Omokha (living, United States), nonfiction
- Yewande Omotoso (b. 1980, Barbados/South Africa), nv.
- Emine Semiye Önasya (1864–1944, Turkey/Ottoman Empire), political & education wr.
- Riku Onda (恩田陸, b. 1964, Japan), nv.
- Heather O'Neill (b. 1973, Canada/Newfoundland), fiction wr., poet & screenwriter
- Louise O'Neill (b. 1985, Ireland), YA nv.
- Geraldine O'Neill (b. 1955, Scotland/Ireland), nv.
- Mary Devenport O'Neill (1879–1967, Ireland), poet & pw.
- Moira O'Neill (Agnes Shakespeare Higginson, 1864–1955, Ireland/Can), poet
- Gabriela Onetto (b. 1963, Uruguay), poet & fiction wr.
- Makena Onjerika (b. 1980s, Kenya), wr.
- Fuyumi Ono (小野不由美, b. 1960, Japan), nv.
- Hiromu Ono (小野弥夢, b. 1984, Japan), manga creator
- Natsume Ono (オノナツメ, b. 1977, Japan), manga creator
- Nuzo Onoh (b. 1962, Nigeria/England), horror wr.
- Chibundu Onuzo (b. 1991, Nigeria), nv.
- Osonye Tess Onwueme (b. 1955, Nigeria), pw., scholar & poet
- Ifeoma Onyefulu (b. 1959, Nigeria), ch. wr. & nv.
- Amelia Opie (1769–1853, England), nv. & biographer
- Mary Oppen (1908–1990 United States), poet, wr. & artist
- Meaghan Oppenheimer (b. 1986, US), screen wr.
- Claudia Orange (b. 1938, New Zealand), historian
- Baroness Orczy (1865–1947, Hungary/England), nv. & illustrator; The Scarlet Pimpernel
- Patrice Ordas (1951–2019, France), nv. & comic wr.
- Caitriona O'Reilly (b. 1973, Ireland), poet & critic
- Emily O'Reilly (living, Ireland), col. & ombudsman
- Margie Orford (b. 1964, England/South Africa), fiction, non-f. & ch. wr.
- Doris Orgel (1929–2021, Austria/Austria-Hungary/England), ch. & non-f. wr. in English
- Bukola Oriola (b. 1976, Nigeria/United States), col. & autobiographer
- Iza Orjonikidze (1938–2010, Georgia (Caucasus)), poet & politician
- Raisa Orlova (1918–1989, Soviet Union), mem.
- Kate Orman (b. 1968, Australia), science fiction wr.
- Margarita Ormotsadze (b. 1981, Ukraine), col., poet & wr.
- Dorila Castell de Orozco (1845–1930, Uruguay), poet & educator
- Olga Orozco (1920–1999, Argentina), poet & col.
- Adela Orpen (1855–1927, United States/Ireland), fiction & non-f. wr.
- Elvira Orphée (1930–2018, Argentina), fiction wr.
- Sue Orr (b. 1962, New Zealand), fiction wr.
- Hanne Ørstavik (b. 1969, Norway), nv.
- Virginia Elena Ortea (1866–1906, Dominica), col. & nv.
- Anna Maria Ortese (1914–1998, Italy), fiction & travel wr. & poet
- Alicia Dujovne Ortiz (b. 1940, Argentina), poet, fiction wr. & biographer
- Emilia Ortiz (1917–2012, Mexico), poet & cartoonist
- Helena Araújo Ortiz (1934–2015, Colombia), feminist wr. & critic
- Julia Anna Orum (1843–1904, United States), textbook wr.
- Eliza Orzeszkowa (1841–1910, Poland), nv. & political wr.
- Joanne van Os (b. 1955, Australia), fiction & ch. wr. & mem.
- Beatrice Osborn (Margaret Fane, 1887–1962, Australia), nv. & poet
- Pat O'Shea (1931–2007, Ireland), ch. wr.
- Masumi Oshima (大島真寿美, b. 1962, Japan), nv.
- Yumiko Ōshima (大島弓子, b. 1947, Japan), manga creator
- Ayisha Osori (living, Nigeria), political wr.
- Elvira Santa Cruz Ossa (1886–1960, Chile), pw. & nv.
- Martha Ostenso (1900–1963, Norway/Canada/Newfoundland), nv. & screenwriter
- Nan Inger Östman (1923–2015, Sweden), ch. wr.
- Ljubica Ostojić (1945–2021, Yugoslavia/Bosnia-Herzegovina), poet, wr. & pw.
- Leanne O'Sullivan (living, Ireland), poet
- Maggie O'Sullivan (1908–1990, England), poet
- Mary Josephine Donovan O'Sullivan (1887–1966, Ireland), historian & academic
- Maureen Donovan O'Sullivan (1887–1966, Ireland), educator & historian
- Suzanne O'Sullivan (living, Ireland), neurologist
- Alice Oswald (b. 1966, England), poet
- Yōko Ōta (大田 洋子, 1906–1963, Japan), nuclear war nv.
- Ōtagaki Rengetsu (太田垣蓮月, 1791–1875, Japan), poet & calligrapher
- Ōtomo no Sakanoue no Iratsume (大伴坂上郎女, c. 700–750, Japan), poet
- Julie Otsuka (b. 1962, United States), nv.
- Katrin Ottarsdóttir (b. 1957, Faroe Islands), poet & film director
- Elise Otté (1818–1903, Denmark/England), grammarian
- Louise Otto-Peters (1819–1895, Germany), nv., poet & librettist
- Annette Jocelyn Otway-Ruthven (1909–1989, Ireland), historian & academic
- Malika Oufkir (b. 1953, Morocco), prison autobiographer
- Ouida (1839–1908, England), fiction wr.
- Touria Oulehri (b. 196271, Greece), theater critic
- Out el Kouloub (1899-1968), Egyptian novelist
- Clementina Díaz y de Ovando (1916–2012, Mexico), arts wr. & academic
- Helen Ovbiagele (b. 1944, Nigeria), nv.
- Angelika Overath (b. 1957, Germany), fiction and non-f. wr.
- Caroline Overington (b. 1970, Australia), wr.
- Mercy Adoma Owusu-Nimoh (1936–2011, Ghana/Gold Coast), ch. wr. & politician
- Jan Owen (b. 1940, Australia), poet
- Sue Owen (b. 1942, United States), poet
- Olivia Owenson, Lady Clarke (1785–1845, Ireland), poet & pw.
- Martha Tracy Owler (1852–1916, United States), journalist & wr.
- Yvonne Adhiambo Owuor (b. 1968, Kenya), fiction wr.
- Hiroko Oyamada (大伴坂上郎女, b. 1983, Japan), fiction wr.
- Gwendolen Overton (1874/76-1958, United States), nv. & ss. wr.
- Helen Oyeyemi (b. 1984, England/Czechoslovakia/Czech Republic), fiction wr.
- Aysel Özakın (b. 1942, Turkey/Ottoman Empire/England), fiction & ch. wr.
- Mari Ozawa (小沢真理, living, Japan), manga creator
- Emine Sevgi Özdamar (b. 1956, Turkey/Ottoman Empire/Germany), nv. & pw. in German
- Ruth Ozeki (b. 1956, United States/Canada/Newfoundland), nv. & academic
- Cynthia Ozick (b. 1928, United States), critic & nv.
- Tezer Özlü (1943–1986, Turkey/Ottoman Empire), wr.
- Hanna Ożogowska (1904–1995, Poland), nv. & poet
- Mona Ozouf (b. 1931, France), historian & philosopher

== P ==
=== Pa–Pj ===
- Henriette Paalzow (1788–1847, Germany), nv.
- Julia Tuñón Pablos (b. 1948, Mexico), historian and social wr.
- Joy Packer (1905–1977, South Africa), nv. and autobiographer in English
- Ruth Padel (b. 1946, England), poet, critic and naturalist
- Manjula Padmanabhan (b. 1953, India), pw. and ch. wr.
- Elvira Pagã (1920–2003, Brazil), wr. and actor
- Isabel Pagan (c. 1740–1821, Scotland), poet
- Susana Pagano (b. 1968, Mexico), fiction wr.
- Gertrude Page (1872–1922, England/Zimbabwe), fiction wr.
- Karen A. Page (b. 1962, United States), food wr.
- Elaine Pagels (b. 1943, United States), religious historian and wr.
- Camille Paglia (b. 1947, United States), es.
- Pagu, 1910–1962, Brazil), wr., poet and pw.
- Alina Paim (1919–2011, Brazil), fiction and ch. wr.
- Charlotte Painter (b. 1926, United States), nv. and wr.
- Pavlina Pajk (1854–1901, Italy/Austria/Austria-Hungary), poet, nv. and es. in Slovenian
- Imbi Paju (b. 1959, Estonia/Finland), wr. and filmmaker
- Pak Hwasong (박화성, 1904–1988, Korea), fiction wr. and es.
- Pak Kyongni (박경리, 1926–2008, Korea), nv.
- Agustina Palacio de Libarona (1825–1880, Argentina), non-f. wr., storyteller, heroine
- Angela Palacious (b. 1953, Bahamas), Christian wr. and minister
- Maria Palaiologina, Queen of Serbia (c. 1300–1355, Serbia), wr.
- Milkana G. Palavurova (b. 1974, Bulgaria), wr. on yoga and health
- Marina Palei (b. 1955, Soviet Union/Netherlands), fiction wr.
- Grace Paley (1922–2007, United States), fiction wr., poet and activist
- Angeliki Palli (1798–1875, Italy), fiction wr., pw. and poet
- Angélica Palma (1878–1935, Peru), wr. and biographer
- Annie Yellowe Palma (1962–2022, Northern Ireland/England), poet, author and social worker
- Connie Palmen (b. 1955, Netherlands), nv.
- Àngels Cardona Palmer (b. 1951, Spain), poet and activist
- Fanny Purdy Palmer (1839–1923, United States), wr., poet, lecturer and activist
- Helen Palmer (1917–1979, Australia), educator and historian
- Nettie Palmer (1885–1964, Australia), poet, es. and critic
- Kirsti Paltto (b. 1947, Finland), pw., fiction and ch. wr. in N. Sámi
- Laksmi Pamuntjak (b. 1971, Indonesia), poet, nv. and food wr.
- Lynn Pan (潘翎, b. 1945, China/England), non-f. wr.
- Avdotya Panaeva (1820–1893, Russia), fiction wr. and mem.
- Melissa Panarello (b. 1985, Italy), nv.
- Mimí Panayotti (1938–2023, Honduras), wr. & journalist
- Katherine Pancol (b. 1954, France), nv.
- Mrinal Pande (b. 1946, India), broadcaster and fiction wr.
- Emmeline Pankhurst (1858–1928, England), activist and autobiographer
- Sylvia Pankhurst (1882–1960, England), suffragist and poet
- Vera Panova (1905–1973, Soviet Union), nv. and pw.
- Meghna Pant (living, India), fiction wr.
- Yolanda Pantin (b. 1954, Venezuela), poet and ch. wr.
- Cristina Pantoja-Hidalgo (b. 1944, Philippines), wr. and critic
- Katina Papa (1903–1959, Greece), poet and nv.
- Hortensia Papadat-Bengescu (1876–1955, Romania), nv.
- Makereti Papakura (1873–1930, New Zealand), guidebook wr.
- Maria Papayanni (b. 1964, Greece), ch. and YA wr.
- Bertha Pappenheim (1859–1936, Austria/Austria-Hungary), fiction and ch. wr., pw. and poet
- Intan Paramaditha (living, Indonesia), wr. and academic
- Loreto Paras-Sulit (1908–2008, Philippines), fiction wr. in English
- Julia Pardoe (1804–1862, England), poet and nv.
- Rashmi Parekh (born 1976, India), poet
- Gladys Parentelli (b. 1935, Uruguay), theologian
- Sara Paretsky (b. 1947, United States), nv.
- Aşıq Pəri (Ashiq Peri, c. 1811 – c. 1847, Azerbaijan), lyric poet
- Susan Parisi (b. 1958, Canada/Newfoundland/Australia), horror fiction wr.
- Paula Parisot (b. 1978, Brazil), wr. and illustrator
- Eeva Park (b. 1950, Estonia), poet and fiction wr.
- Ruth Park (1917–2010, New Zealand/Australia), nv. and ch. wr.
- Park Wan-suh (박완서, 1931–2011, Korea), fiction wr.
- Barbara Parker (1947–2009, United States), nv.
- Catherine Langloh Parker (c. 1855–1940, Australia), fiction wr. and folklorist
- Dorothy Parker (1893–1967, United States), poet, critic and fiction wr.
- Jane Marsh Parker (1836–1913, United States), wr. and nv.
- Pat Parker (1944–1989, United States), poet and activist
- Una-Mary Parker (1930–2019, England), nv.
- Molly Parkin (1932–2026, Wales), nv. and painter
- Amy Parkinson (1855–1938, Canada), poet
- Siobhán Parkinson (b. 1954, Ireland), ch. wr.
- Adele Parks (b. 1969, England), fiction wr.
- Suzan-Lori Parks (b. 1964, United States), pw. and screenwriter
- Peggy Parnass (1927–2025, Germany/Sweden), fiction and non-f. wr. and actor
- Fanny Parnell (1848–1882, Ireland), poet and nationalist
- Sophia Parnok (1885–1933, Russia/Soviet Union), poet
- Katherine Parr (1512–1548, England), Queen Consort
- Valeria Parrella (b. 1974, Italy), fiction wr. and pw.
- Anne Parrish (1888–1957, United States), ch. and nv.
- Ursula Parrott (1899–1957, United States), fiction wr.
- Anne Spencer Parry (1931–1985, Australia), fantasy wr.
- Lorae Parry (b. 1955, Australia/New Zealand), pw. and actor
- Sarah Winifred Parry (1870–1953, Wales), fiction wr.
- Amy Parry-Williams (1910–1988, Wales), wr. and singer
- Shahrnush Parsipur (b. 1946, Iran/Persia), fiction and ch. wr.
- Eliza Parsons (1739–1811, England), nv.
- Julie Parsons (b. 1951, New Zealand), crime wr.
- Alicia Partnoy (b. 1955, Argentina), poet, translator and activist
- Sarah Willis Parton (1811–1872, United States), nv., col. and ch. wr.
- Mrs F. C. Patrick (fl. 18th century, Ireland), nv.
- S. A. Partridge (b. 1982, South Africa), YA writer in English
- Vesna Parun (1922–2010, Yugoslavia/Croatia), poet
- Magdalena Parys (b. 1971, Poland/Germany), wr.
- Jacqueline Pascarl (b. 1963, Australia), mem. and rights advocate
- Atena Pashko (1931–2012, Ukraine), chemical engineer, poet, social activist
- Nicoletta Pasquale (fl. 1540, Italy), poet
- Josefina Passadori (1900–1987, Argentina), wr. and educator
- Linda Pastan (1932–2023, United States), poet
- Ann Patchett (b. 1963, United States), nv.
- Dhiruben Patel (1926–2023, India), nv. and pw.
- Shailja Patel (living, Kenya), poet and pw.
- Elena Patron (1933–2021), Philippines), nv., poet and scriptwriter
- Grace Espy Patton (1896–1904, United States), nv. and non-f. wr.
- Jenny Pattrick (b. 1936, New Zealand), nv.
- Polly Pattullo (living, England), author, journalist, editor and publisher
- Evelyn Patuawa-Nathan (1933–2019, New Zealand), wr.
- Helena Patursson (1864–1916, Faroe Islands), wr., pw. and feminist
- Phyllis Paul (1903–1973, England), writer of supernatural fiction.
- Ève Paul-Margueritte (1885–1971, France), nv. & translator
- Lucie Paul-Margueritte (1886–1955, France), nov. non-f. wr., plays & translator
- Hertha Pauli (1906–1973, Austria/Austria-Hungary/United States), ch. and non-f. wr. in German and English
- Irene Levine Paull (1908–1981, United States), wr. and labor activist
- Laline Paull (living, England), nv.
- Dora Pavel (b. 1946, Romania), fiction wr. and poet
- Laura Pavel (b. 1968, Romania), es. and critic
- Karolina Pavlova (1807–1893, Russia), poet and nv.
- Vera Pavlova (b. 1963, Soviet Union/Russia), poet
- Milena Pavlović-Barili (1909–1945, Serbia), poet
- Maria Pawlikowska-Jasnorzewska (1891–1945, Poland), poet and pw.
- Halina Pawlowská (b. 1955), pw. and fiction wr.
- Patricia Payne (living, Australia), screenwriter
- Marcela Paz (1902–1985, Chile), ch. wr.
- Olena Pchilka (1849–1930, Russia/Ukraine), poet and pw.
- Isabel Peacocke (1881–1973, New Zealand), nv. and broadcaster
- Philippa Pearce (1920–2006, England), ch. wr.
- Sharrona Pearl (b. 1977, Canada/United States), historian
- Edith Pearlman (1936–2023, United States), fiction and non-f. wr.
- Mabel Cosgrove Wodehouse Pearse (b. 1872, death unknown), nv. and criminal
- Allison Pearson (b. 1960, Wales), col. and nv.
- Maria Purdy Peck (1840–1914, United States), non-f. wr.
- Lucy Creemer Peckham (1842–1923, United States), poet
- Amparo Cabanes Pecourt (b. 1938, Spain), historian
- Laura Pedersen (b. 1965, United States), wr., humorist and pw.
- Ethel Pedley (1859–1898, Australia), wr. and musician
- Erica Pedretti (1930–2022, Czechoslovakia/Czech Republic/Switzerland), wr. in German
- Inês Pedrosa (b. 1962, Portugal), fiction wr. and pw.
- Margaret Bloodgood Peeke (1838–1908, United States), traveler, lecturer, wr.
- Janet Peery (b. 1948, United States), fiction wr.
- Amelia Blossom Pegram (1935–2022, South Africa), wr. and performer in English
- Annette Pehnt (b. 1967, Germany), academic wr. and critic
- Madeleine Pelletier (1874–1939, France), activist and physician
- Margarita Peña (1937–2018, Mexico), non-f. wr. and educator
- Margaret Pender (1848–1920, Ireland), poet and fiction wr.
- Eila Pennanen (1916–1994, Finland), nv., es. and pw.
- Anne Penny (1729–1784, Wales), poet
- Louise Penny (b. 1958, Canada/Newfoundland), nv.
- Ethel Penrose (1857–1938, Ireland), ch. wr.
- Emily Pepys (1833–1877, England), child diarist
- Mariana Percovich (b. 1963, Uruguay), pw. and educator
- Jennifer Percy (living, United States), wr.
- Jeanne Perego (b. 1958, Italy), ch. writer and biographer
- Ana Teresa Pereira (b. 1958, Portugal), nv.
- Charmaine Pereira (living, Nigeria), non-f. wr.
- Carina Perelli (b. 1957, Uruguay), political wr.
- Ana Mercedes Perez (1910–1994, Venezuela), poet, wr. and translator
- Eva Díaz Pérez (b. 1971, Spain), nv.
- Julia Pérez Montes de Oca (1839–1875, Cuba), poet
- Narcisa Pérez Reoyo (1849–1876, Spain), writer
- Cristina Peri Rossi (b. 1941, Uruguay/Spain), fiction wr., poet & translator
- Emily Perkins (b. 1970, New Zealand), fiction wr.
- Sarah Maria Clinton Perkins (1824–1905, United States), ch. wr., social reformer, minister
- Mary Elizabeth Perley (1863–?, United States), educator, wr.
- Nicole Perlman (b. 1981, United States), screenwriter
- Olga Perovskaya (1902–1961, Soviet Union), ch. wr.
- Perpetua (died AD 203, Ancient Rome), prison diarist in Latin
- Amelia Perrier (1841–1875, Ireland), nv. and travel wr.
- Kayla Perrin (b. c. 1970, Jamaica/Canada), nv. and ch. wr.
- Alice Perry (1885–1969, Ireland), poet and engineer
- Carlotta Perry (1839/1848–1914, United States), wr. and poet
- Grace Perry (1927–1987, Australia), poet and editor
- Ingrid Persaud (living, Trinidad/England), fiction wr.
- Lakshmi Persaud (1937–2024), Trinidad/UK), nv.
- Margarita Perveņecka (b. 1976, Latvia), pw. and prose wr.
- Marisha Pessl (b. 1977, United States), YA nv.
- Meher Pestonji (b. 1946, India), nv., col. and social worker
- Julia Peterkin (1880–1961, United States), fiction wr.
- Alice E. Heckler Peters (1845–1921, United States), non-f. wr. and poet
- Elizabeth Peters (1927–2013, United States), nv.
- Ellis Peters (1913–1995, Wales/England), mystery wr. and translator
- Marie Petersen (1816–1859, Germany), story wr.
- Magdalena Petit (1903–1968, Chile), nv. and es.
- Gabrielė Petkevičaitė-Bitė (1861–1943, Lithuania), fiction wr. and diarist
- Marta Petreu (b. 1955, Romania), philosopher, critic and poet
- Sandra Petrignani (b. 1952, Italy), fiction wr.
- Kata Szidónia Petrőczy (1659–1708, Hungary), wr. and poet
- Marine Petrossian (b. 1960, Armenia), poet, es. and col.
- Maria Petrovykh (1908–1979, Russia/Soviet Union), poet
- Lyudmila Petrushevskaya (b. 1938, Soviet Union/Russia), wr. and pw.
- Ann Petry (1908–1997, United States), fiction wr. and col.
- Aline Pettersson (b. 1938, Mexico), nv. and poet
- Dianne Ruth Pettis (1955–2008, New Zealand), fiction wr. and poet
- Sophie Petzal (b. 1990, England), screenwriter
- Georges de Peyrebrune (1841–1917, France), nv.
- Giulietta Pezzi (1810–1878, Italy), poet, nv. and pw.
- Ida Laura Pfeiffer (1797–1858, Austria/Austria-Hungary), travel wr.
- Sara Pfeiffer (1829-1913 Sweden), nv.
- Hoa Pham (living, Australia), fiction and ch. wr.
- Anna Augusta Von Helmholtz-Phelan (1890–1964, United States), professor, non-f. wr. and poet
- Nancy Phelan (1913–2008, Australia), nv. and travel wr.
- M. Nourbese Philip (b. 1947, Canada/Newfoundland), poet, wr. and pw.
- Monique Philippart (b. 1955, Luxembourg), ch. wr. in German
- Katherine Philips (1631–1664, England), poet
- Angela Phillips (living, England), journalist and academic
- April Phillips (b. 1965, England/New Zealand), pw. and actor
- Eluned Phillips (1914–2009, Wales), bard and mem.
- Esther Phillips (b. 1950, Barbados), poet
- Jayne Anne Phillips (b. 1952, United States), fiction wr.
- J. J. Phillips (b. 1944, United States), poet, nv. and activist
- Phintys (or Phyntis, 4th or 3rd century BC, Ancient Greece), philosopher
- Joan Phipson (1912–2003, Australia), ch. wr.
- Virginia Phiri (b. 1954, Zimbabwe), fiction and non-f. wr.
- Savitribai Phule (1831–1897, India), poet and educator
- Ife Piankhi (living, Uganda/England), poet, singer and educator
- Hester Sigerson Piatt (1870–1939, Ireland), poet and col.
- Costanza d'Avalos Piccolomini (b. 1560, Italy), poet
- Karoline Pichler (1769–1843, Austria/Austria-Hungary), nv.
- Hella Pick (1929–2024, Austria/Austria-Hungary/England), non-f. wr. in English
- Jodi Picoult (b. 1966, United States), nv.
- Phyllis Piddington (1910–2001, Australia), fiction wr. and poet
- Mariyka Pidhiryanka (1881–1963, Russia/Ukraine), poet and ch. wr.
- Antoinette Pienaar (b. 1961, South Africa), writer in Afrikaans on folk medicine
- Meredith Ann Pierce (b. 1958, United States), fantasy wr.
- Nicola Pierce (living, Ireland), nv.
- Tamora Pierce (b. 1954, United States), ch. nv.
- Marge Piercy (b. 1936, United States), poet, nv. and activist
- Leonie Pihama (b. 1962, New Zealand), Māori academic
- Rosamunde Pilcher (1924–2019, England), romance wr.
- Laetitia Pilkington (c. 1709–1750, Ireland), poet
- Mary Pilkington (1761–1839, England), nv., ch. wr. and poet
- Careen Pilo (fl. 2010s, Cameroon), wr. and diplomat
- Eleonora Fonseca Pimentel (1752–1799, Italy), poet
- Florencia del Pinar (15th century, Spain), poet
- Tillie S. Pine (1896–1999, Poland/United States), ch. wr.
- Andrea Davis Pinkney (b. 1965, United States), children's wr.
- Winsome Pinnock (b. 1961, England), pw.
- Nélida Piñon (1937–2022, Brazil), nv.
- Clara Pinto-Correia (1960–2025, Portugal), nv. and educator
- Gita Piramal (b. 1954, India), business wr.
- Zoya Pirzad (b. 1952, Iran/Persia), nv.
- Hortensia Blanch Pita (1914–2004, Cuba/Mexico), historian
- Juana Rosa Pita (b. 1939, Cuba/United States), poet
- Bridget Pitt (living, Zimbabwe/South Africa), poet and fiction and non-f. wr. in English
- Marie E. J. Pitt (1869–1948, Australia), poet
- Ruth Pitter (1897–1992, England), poet
- Minnie A. Weeks Pittock (1862–1915), novelist
- Fernanda Pivano (1917–2009, Italy), wr.
- Mary Pix (1666–1709, England), nv. and pw.
- Christine de Pizan (1364–1430, Italy), poet and rhetorician in French
- Alejandra Pizarnik (1936–1972, Argentina), poet
- Christine de Pizan (1364–c. 1430, Italy), poet and advisor
- Marjorie Pizer (1920–2016, Australia), poet
- Helgi Pjeturss (1872–1949, Iceland), geologist and philosopher

=== Pk–Py ===
- Tamri Pkhakadze (b. 1957, Georgia (Caucasus)), nv. & ch. wr.
- Josefina Pla (1903–1999, Spain/Paraguay), poet, pw. & painter
- Ana Plácido (1831–1895, Portugal), nv. & autobiographer
- Sylvia Plath (1932–1963, United States), poet, fiction wr. & es.
- Ann Plato (c. 1820–?, United States), es.
- Karen Platt (fl. 2004–present, England), garden wr.
- Polly Platt (1927–2008, United States), wr. on France
- Agneta Pleijel (b. 1940, Sweden), nv., poet & pw.
- Louise von Plessen (1725–1799, Austria/Austria-Hungary/Denmark), mem. & royal lady in waiting
- Anne Plichota (b. 1968, France), ch. wr.
- Luise von Ploennies (1803–1872, Germany), poet
- Vivienne Plumb (b. 1955, Australia/New Zealand), poet, pw. & fiction wr.
- Amélie Plume (b. 1943, Switzerland), nv. in French
- Anne Plumptre (1760–1818, England), fiction & political wr.
- Sophie Podolski (1953–1974, Belgium), poet in French
- Karla Poewe (b. 1941, Germany), anthropologist and historian
- Maria Pognon (1844–1925, France), col. and activist
- Aliénor de Poitiers (1444/1446–1509, France), wr. on etiquette
- Elizabeth Polack (fl. 1830–1838, England), pw.
- Gillian Polack (b. 1961, Australia), fiction wr. & editor
- Marguerite Poland (b. 1950, South Africa), linguist & ch. wr. in English
- Susan Polgar (b. 1969, Hungary/United States), chess wr. & grandmaster
- Anna Politkovskaya (1958–2006, Soviet Union/Russia), political wr.
- Leonora Polkinghorne (1873–1953, Australia), wr. & activist
- Rachel Pollack (1945–2023, United States), non-f & nv. wr.
- Madeleine A. Polland (1918–2005, Ireland), ch. wr.
- Velma Pollard (1937–2025, Jamaica), poet & fiction wr.
- Amalia Polleri (1909–1996, Uruguay), poet & critic
- Sarah Polley (b. 1979, Canada/Newfoundland), screenwriter & activist
- Katha Pollitt (b. 1948, United States), feminist poet, es. & critic
- Elizaveta Polonskaya (1890–1969, Russia/Soviet Union), poet & col.
- Maria Polydouri (1902–1930, Greece), poet
- Elena Poniatowska (b. 1932, France/Mexico), fiction & non-f. wr.
- Hana Ponická (1922–2007, Czechoslovakia/Czech Republic/Pv), political wr.
- Hannah Azieb Pool (b. 1974, England/Eritrea), wr. & col.
- Ida Margaret Graves Poore (1859–1941, Ireland/England), autobiographer & poet
- Gudibande Poornima (living, India), poet & nv.
- Olúmìdé Pópóọlá (living, Nigeria/Germany), poet & nv.
- Elizabeth Polwheele (1651 – c. 1691, England), pw.
- Elena Poniatowska (b. 1932, Poland/Mexico), fiction wr. & col.
- Marie Ponsot (1921–2019, United States), poet & es.
- Elsa Pooley (b. 1947, South Africa), botanical wr. in English
- Cora Scott Pond Pope (1856–?, United States), pageant wr., activist
- Elena Pop-Hossu-Longin (1862–1940, Austria/Austria-Hungary/Romania), non-f. wr. & activist
- Maria Popova (b. 1984, Bulgaria/United States), critic
- Adelheid Popp (1869–1939, Austria/Austria-Hungary), feminist wr. & autobiographer
- Azalais de Porcairagues (late 12th century, France), poet in Occitan
- Alicia Porro (1908–1983, Uruguay), poet & musician
- Alice Hobbins Porter (1854–1926, England/United States), journalist & wr.
- Anna Maria Porter (1780–1832, England), poet & nv.
- Delia Lyman Porter (1858–1933, United States), wr.
- Dorothy Featherstone Porter (1954–2008, Australia), poet
- Eleanor H. Porter (1868–1920, United States), ch. wr.; Pollyanna
- Jane Porter (1776–1850, England), nv. & pw.
- Katherine Anne Porter (1890–1980, United States), col. & nv.
- Marie Porter (b. 1939), wr. & welfare advocate
- Rebecca N. Porter (1883-1963, United States), nv., ss., ess., non-f. wr.
- Renada-Laura Portet (1927–2021, France), wr. & linguist
- Margarita López Portillo (1914–2006, Mexico), nv.
- Ethel Portnoy (1927–2004, United States/Netherlands), nv. in English
- Suzanne Portnoy (b. 1961, England), wr. & pw.
- Teresa Porzecanski (b. 1945, Uruguay), fiction wr. & anthropologist
- Dina Posada (b. 1946, Somalia/Guatemala), poet
- Carmen Posadas (b. 1963, Uruguay/Spain), ch. wr.
- Francesca Bortolotto Possati (living, Italy), wr.
- Birgitte Possing (b. 1952, Denmark), historian & biographer
- Emily Post (1873–1960, United States), nv.
- Sue-Ann Post (b. 1964, Australia), comedian & wr.
- Halina Poświatowska (1935–1967, Poland), poet & correspondent
- Beatrix Potter (1866–1943, England), ch. wr. & illustrator; The Tale of Peter Rabbit
- Anna M. Longshore Potts (1829–1912, United States), non-f. wr.
- Alice Poulleau (1885–1960, France), geographer, historian & poet
- Kira Poutanen (b. 1974, Finland/France), nv. & actor
- Helvi Poutasuo (1914–2017, Finland), academic & wr. in Sámi
- Dawn Powell (1896–1965, United States), fiction wr. & pw.
- Patricia Powell (b. 1966, Jamaica), nv.
- Sidney Powell (b. 1955, United States), attorney, non-f. wr.
- Eileen Power (1889–1940, England), economic historian & medievalist
- Máire Wyse Power (1887–1916, Ireland), Celtic scholar
- Marguerite Agnes Power (1815–1867, Ireland/England), nv. & commentator
- Marguerite Helen Power (1870–1957, Australia), poet
- Rhoda Power (1890–1957, England), educational & ch. wr.
- Eve Pownall (1901–1982, Australia), ch. wr. & historian
- Anne B. Poyntz (b. between 1701–1750, England/Ireland), poet
- Luz Pozo Garza (1922–2020, Spanish), poet
- Antonia Pozzi (1912–1938, Italy), poet
- Manjiri Prabhu (b. 1964, India), pw. & TV producer
- Núria Pradas (b. 1954, Spain), philologist & wr.
- Manasi Pradhan (b. 1962, India), poet, writer & activist
- Adélia Prado (b. 1935, Brazil), wr. & poet
- Rosa Praed (Mrs Campbell Praed, 1851–1935, Australia), nv.
- Katharina Prato (1818–1897, Austria/Austria-Hungary), cookery wr.
- Sofiya Pregel (1894–1972, Russia/France), poet
- Stefanie Preissner (b. 1988, Ireland), poet & pw.
- Gabriela Preissová (1862–1946, Austria/Austria-Hungary/Czechoslovakia/Czech Republic), pw. & fiction wr.
- Paula von Preradović (1887–1951, Austria/Austria-Hungary), story wr. & poet
- Mary Newmarch Prescott (1849–1888, United States), wr. & poet
- Karen Press (b. 1956, South Africa), poet in English
- Jewel Prestage (1931–2014, United States), political scientist
- Angharad Price (living, Wales), nv. & academic
- Deon Nielsen Price (born 1934, America), musical wr.
- Evadne Price (1888–1985, Australia), wr.
- Katharine Susannah Prichard (1883–1969, Australia), fiction wr. & pw.
- Priest (b. 1988, China), fiction wr. & nv.
- Rebecca Priestley (living, New Zealand), science historian & academic
- Maria Prilezhayeva (1903–1989, Russia/Soviet Union), ch. wr. & critic
- Diane di Prima (1934–2020, United States), poet
- Althea Prince (b. 1945, Antigua/Canada/Newfoundland), wr., editor & professor
- Mary Prince (c. 1788 – post-1833, Bermuda), autobiographer
- Pauline Prior-Pitt (living, Scotland), poet
- Amrita Pritam (1919–2005, India), poet, nv. & es.
- Nalini Priyadarshni (living, India), poet & wr.
- Faltonia Betitia Proba (c. 306/315 – c. 353/366, Ancient Rome), poet in Latin
- May Probyn (1856–1909, England), poet
- Lenka Procházková (b. 1951, Czechoslovakia/Czech Republic), nv. & radio pw.
- Adelaide Anne Procter (1825–1864, England), poet
- Elaine Proctor (b. 1960, South Africa), screenwriter & nv. in English
- Mary Virginia Proctor (1854–1927, United States), non-f. wr.
- Lilli Promet (1922–2007, Estonia), nv. & es.
- Francine Prose (b. 1947, United States), fiction & non-f. wr. & critic
- Annie Proulx (b. 1935, United States), fiction & non-f. wr.
- Anne Provoost (b. 1964, Belgium), YA fiction wr. in French
- Florence Prusmack (1920–2013, United States), nv.
- Myfanwy Pryce (1890–1976, England), fiction wr.
- Stanisława Przybyszewska (1901–1935, Austria/Austria-Hungary/Poland), pw.
- Sofija Pšibiliauskienė (1867–1926, Lithuania), fiction wr.
- Lucía Puenzo (b. 1976, Argentina), nv. & film director
- María Luisa Puga (1944–2004, Mexico), fiction & ch. wr.
- Esther Pugh (1834–1908, United States), editor
- Sheenagh Pugh (b. 1950, Wales), poet & nv.
- Alenka Puhar (b. 1945, Yugoslavia/Slovenia), social historian
- Marina Šur Puhlovski (living, Croatia), nv. & es.
- Carmen Montoriol Puig (1893–1966, Spain), poet, wr. & pw.
- Odette du Puigaudeau (1894–1991, France), traveler & wr.
- Adriana Puiggrós (b. 1941, Argentina), non-f. wr. & educator
- Erenora Puketapu-Hetet (1941–2006, New Zealand), wr. & weaver
- Rufina Pukhova (1932–2021, Soviet Union/Russia), mem.
- Paulina Pukytė (b. 1966, Lithuania), poet, critic & artist
- Antonia Tanini Pulci (1452/1454–1501, Italy), pw.
- Elizabeth Pulford (b. 1943, Canada/Newfoundland/New Zealand), ch., YA, fiction & non-f. wr. & poet
- Riikka Pulkkinen (b. 1980, Finland), nv.
- Benka Pulko (b. 1967, Yugoslavia/Slovenia), travel wr.
- Theresa Pulszky (1819–1866, Austria), historical and travel wr.
- Alice Pung (b. 1981, Australia), nv., mem. & lawyer
- Deirdre Purcell (b. 1945, Ireland), nv. & biographer
- Elizabeth Purbeck (fl. 1789–1802, England), novelist together with her sister Jane
- Katherine Purdon (1852–1920, Ireland), nv. & pw.
- Neel Kamal Puri (b. 1956, India), fiction wr. & educator
- Jennie Phelps Purvis (1831–1924, United States), wr., suffragist, reformer
- Luise F. Pusch (b. 1944, Germany), academic linguist
- Fanny Puyesky (1939–2010, Uruguay), social wr.
- Barbara Pym (1913–1980, England), nv.
- Helen Pyne-Timothy (1937–2015, Jamaica), critic & academic
- Maria Pypelinckx (1538–1608, Flanders/Germany), correspondent in Flemish
- Svitlana Pyrkalo (b. 1976, Ukraine/England), nv. & es.

== Q ==
- Najwa Qassem (1967–2020, Lebanon), col. & broadcaster
- Li Qingzhao (李清照, 1084 – c. 1155 or 1081 – c. 1141, China), poet
- Qiu Jin (秋瑾, 1875–1907, China), revolutionary & feminist wr.
- Marjorie Quarton (b. 1930, Ireland), ch. wr. & nv.
- Ada Quayle (1920–2002, Jamaica), nv.
- Daisy May Queen (b. 1965, Argentina)
- Diná Silveira de Queirós (1911–1982, Brazil)
- Rachel de Queiroz (1910–2003, Brazil)
- Catharina Questiers (1631–1669, Netherlands), poet & pw.
- Alison Quigan (fl. 1980s, New Zealand), pw. & actor
- Betty Quin (died 1993, Australia), scriptwriter
- Anna Quindlen (b. 1953, United States), nv. & col.
- Rebeca Quintáns (b. 1964, Spain), research wr.
- Elena Quiroga (1921–1995, Spain), nv.
- Christine Qunta (b. 1952, South Africa), poet & social wr. in English
- Anne Margrethe Qvitzow (1652–1700, Denmark), poet, translator & mem.

== R ==
=== Ra–Ri ===
- Ra Heeduk (나희덕, b. 1966, Korea), poet
- Marie de Rabutin-Chantal, marquise de Sévigné (1626–1696, France), correspondent
- Rachilde (1860–1953, France), nv. & pw.
- Ann Radcliffe (1764–1823, England), nv.; The Mysteries of Udolpho
- Radegund (c. 520–586, France), princess/poet in Latin
- Thérèse Radic (b. 1935, Australia), pw. & musicologist
- Valentina Dimitrova Radinska (b. 1951, Bulgaria), poet
- Giedra Radvilavičiūtė (b. 1960, Lithuania), fiction wr.
- Undinė Radzevičiūtė (b. 1967, Lithuania), fiction wr.
- Gwynedd Rae (1892–1977, Wales), ch. wr.
- Janet Milne Rae (1844–1933, Scotland), fiction wr.
- Sophie Raffalovich (1860–1960, Ireland), nv.
- Nigar Rafibeyli (1913–1981, Azerbaijan), poet
- Orlaith Rafter (living, Ireland), pw. & nv.
- Mary Raftery (1957–2012, Ireland), wr. & filmmaker
- Marimo Ragawa (羅川真里茂, living, Japan), manga creator
- Jennifer Rahim (1963–2023, Trinidad), educator & wr.
- Bushra Rahman (1944–2022), Pakistan), nv. & politician
- Rizia Rahman (1939–2019, India/Bangladesh), fiction wr.
- Allen Raine (1836–1908, Wales), nv.
- Maggie Rainey-Smith (b. 1950, New Zealand), fiction wr., es. & poet
- Rita Rait-Kovaleva (1898–1989, Russia/Soviet Union), wr. & translator
- Samina Raja (1961–2012, Pakistan), poet, wr. & broadcaster
- Rajalakshmi (1930–1965, India), fiction wr. & poet
- Rajashree (living, India), nv.
- Maraea Rakuraku (living, New Zealand), pw.
- Ilma Rakusa (b. 1946, Switzerland), wr., es., poet & translator
- Hilda Ram (1858–1901, Belgium), poet & librettist in Flemish
- Anuradha Ramanan (1947–2010, India), fiction wr. & activist
- Hanna Rambe (b. 1940, Indonesia), fiction wr. & biographer
- María Abella de Ramírez (1863–1926, Uruguay), feminist wr.
- Fabrizia Ramondino (1936–2008, Italy), fiction wr., poet & mem.
- Adele Ramos (living, Belize), poet & wr.
- Consuelo González Ramos (1977 – unknown death year, Spain), nursing wr.
- Karolina Ramqvist (b. 1976, Sweden), fiction wr.
- Ayn Rand (1905–1982, Russia/United States), nv. & philosopher
- Charlotte Randall (living, New Zealand), nv.
- Marta Randall (b. 1948, Mexico/United States), science fiction wr.
- Beverley Randell (b. 1931, New Zealand), ch. wr.
- Jo Randerson (b. 1973, New Zealand), pw. & fiction wr.
- Ravinder Randhawa (b. 1952, India/England), fiction wr.
- Mary Randolph (1762–1828, United States), domestic wr.
- Jennifer Rankin (1941–1979, Australia), poet & pw.
- Claudia Rankine (b. 1963, United States), poet & pw.
- Bhargavi Rao (1944–2008, India), fiction wr. & poet
- Malathi Rao (b. 1930, India), nv.
- Rao Xueman (饒雪漫, b. 1972, China), fiction wr.,
- Ágnes Rapai (b. 1952, Hungary), poet & wr.
- Eva Ras (b. 1941, Serbia), poet & fiction wr.
- Huda al-Rasheed (b. c. 1950, Saudi Arabia), nv.
- Fawziya Rashid (b. 1954, Bahrain), fiction wr.
- Lea Ráskay (early 16th century, Hungary), scholar & nun
- Ellen Raskin (1928–1984, United States), ch. wr. & illustrator
- Maria Rasputin (1898–1987, Russia/Soviet Union), mem.
- Patricia Ratto (b. 1962, Argentina), wr.
- Irina Ratushinskaya (1954–2017, Soviet Union/Russia), poet & fiction wr.
- Santha Rama Rau (1923–2009, India/United States), fiction & non-f. wr.
- Elsa Rautee (1897–1987, Finland), poet
- Arlene Raven (1944–2006, United States), art historian, critic, and curator
- Lidia Ravera (b. 1951, Italy), nv., es. & screenwriter
- Dahlia Ravikovitch (1936–2005, Israel), poet & activist
- Olga Ravn (b. 1986, Denmark), poet & nv.
- Angela Rawlings (b. 1978, Canada/Newfoundland), poet, editor & artist
- Marjorie Kinnan Rawlings (1896–1953, United States), nv.
- Gloria Rawlinson (1918–1995, New Zealand), poet & fiction wr.
- Claire Rayner (1931–2010, England), journalist, broadcaster, nv.
- Sarah Rayner (living, England), wr. & copywr.
- Helen Raynor (b. 1972, Wales), scriptwriter
- Angela Readman (b. 1973, England), poet
- Pauline Réage (1907–1998, France), nv.
- Grisélidis Réal (1929–2005, Switzerland), wr. on prostitution in French
- Elizabeth Reapy (living, Ir), fiction wr.
- Anica Savić Rebac (1892–1953, Serbia), es., biographer & translator
- Elisa von der Recke (1754–1833, Germany), Courland wr. & poet in German
- Jayapraga Reddy (1947–1996, South Africa), pw. & short story wr.
- Jaclyn Reding (b. 1966, United States), nv.
- Marie Redonnet (b. 1948, France), poet, nv. & pw.
- Beatrice Redpath (1886–1937, Canada), poet & short story wr.
- Helen Leah Reed (1861/62 - 1926, Canada/US), children's wr.
- Kerry Reed-Gilbert (1956–2019, Australia), poet & wr.
- Märta Helena Reenstierna (1753–1841, Sweden), diarist
- Annie Lee Rees (1864–1949, Australia/New Zealand), wr.
- Rosemary Frances Rees (c. 1875–1963, New Zealand/England), pw., nv. & actor
- Sarah Jane Rees (1839–1916, Wales), poet & teacher
- Clara Reeve (1729–1807, England), nv.
- Amber Reeves (1887–1981, New Zealand), wr. & scholar
- Nell Regan (b. 1969, Ireland), poet & non-f. wr.
- Elisabeth Reichart (b. 1953, Austria/Austria-Hungary), fiction wr. & pw.
- Ruth Reichl (b. 1948, United States), food wr. & mem.
- Eva Gabriele Reichmann (1897–1998, Germany), historian & sociologist
- Ilse Reicke (1893–1989), journalist, novelist and writer
- Christina Reid (1942–2015, Ireland), pw.
- Gayla Reid (b. 1945, Australia/Canada/Newfoundland), nv.
- Kiley Reid (b. 1987, United States), nv.
- Rachel Reid (living, Canada), nv.
- Sue Reidy (living, New Zealand), fiction wr.
- Brigitte Reimann (1933–1973, Germany), nv.
- Mercedes Rein (1930–2006, Uruguay), critic & pw.
- Lenka Reinerová (1916–2008, Czechoslovakia/Czech Republic), nv. in German
- Emma May Alexander Reinertsen (1853–1920, United States), wr.
- Annemarie Reinhard (1921–1976, Germany), nv. & ch. wr.
- Christa Reinig (1926–2008, Germany), poet, wr. & pw.
- Maria Firmina dos Reis (1825–1917, Brazil), nv. & activist
- Małgorzata Rejmer (b. 1985, Poland), fiction wr.
- Kati Rekai (1921–2010, Hungary/Canada/Newfoundland), ch. travel wr.
- Mirkka Rekola (1931–2014, Finland), poet
- Gail Renard (b. c.1951), Canadian/British children's and TV series writer
- Christine Renard (1929–1979, France), science fiction wr.
- Veronique Renard (b. 1965, Netherlands), wr. & artist
- Rosa de Eguílaz y Renart (b. 1864, death date unknown, Spain), pw.
- Mary Renault (1905–1983, England/South Africa), nv. & YA wr.
- Ruth Rendell (1930–2015, England), nv.
- Renée (1929–2023, New Zealand), pw.
- Juliette Rennes (b. 1976, France), non-f. wr.
- Céline Renooz (1840–1928, Belgium/France), science wr. in French
- Nuchhungi Renthlei (1914–2002, India), poet & educator
- Lola Taborga de Requena (1890 – c. 1950, Bolivia), poet
- Laura Restrepo (b. 1950, Comoros), nv. & col.
- Magdalena Dobromila Rettigová (1785–1845), cookery wr.
- Gabriele Reuter (1859–1941, Germany), fiction, es. & ch. wr.
- Gabrielle Réval (1869–1938, France), nv. &, es.
- Sandrine Revel (b. 1969, France), comics wr. & illustrator
- Fanny zu Reventlow (1871–1918, Germany), political wr. & feminist
- Jytte Rex (b. 1942, Denmark), wr., artist & film director
- Ofelia Rey Castelao (b. 1956, Spain) historian, wr., & professor
- Adela Calva Reyes (1967–2018, Mexico), wr. & pw. in Otomi
- Cristina Reyes (b. 1981, Ecuador), poet & politician
- Soledad Reyes (b. 1946, Philippines), scholar & critic
- Lorna Reynolds (1911–2003, Ireland), wr. & academic
- Yasmina Reza (b. 1959, France), pw., actor & nv.
- Regina Rheda (b. 1957, Brazil/United States), fiction & non-f. wr.
- Fouzia Rhissassi (b. 1947, Morocco), social scientist
- Najima Rhozali (b. 1960, Morocco), wr. on legends
- Grace Rhys (1865–1929, Ireland), fiction wr., poet & es.
- Jean Rhys (1890–1979, Dominica/England), nv.; Wide Sargasso Sea
- Fahmida Riaz (1946–2018, Pakistan/India), poet & activist
- Mrs. Riazuddin (1928–2023, Pakistan), feminist & travel wr.
- Ana Ribeiro (b. 1955, Uruguay), nv. & historian
- Esmeralda Ribeiro (b. 1958, Brazil), poet & fiction wr.
- Pamela Ribon (b. 1975, United States), screenwriter
- Catherine of Ricci (1522–1590, Italy), religious wr. & saint
- Marie Jeanne Riccoboni (1713–1792, France), nv. and actor
- Anne Rice (1941–2021, United States), nv.
- Adrienne Rich (1929–2012, United States), feminist poet & es.
- B. Ruby Rich (living, United States), film critic and academic
- Ariel Florencia Richards (b. 1981, Chile), writer & visual arts scholar.
- Jo-Anne Richards (living, South Africa), col. & wr. in English
- Dorothy Richardson (1873–1957, England), fiction wr., poet & es.
- Elizabeth Richardson (1576/1577–1651, England), religious wr.
- Ethel Richardson (1870–1946, Australia), nv.
- Hester Dorsey Richardson (1862–1933, United States), wr.
- Paddy Richardson (living, New Zealand), fiction wr.
- Jutta Richter (b. 1955, Germany), ch. & YA wr.
- Sylvie Richterová (b. 1945, Czechoslovakia/Czech Republic/Italy), fiction wr. & es.
- E. J. Richmond (1825–1918, US), nv. & ch. wr.
- Leigh Richmond (1911-1995), American writer
- Jessie Louisa Rickard (1876–1963, Ireland), fiction & non-f. wr.
- Elsie Alvarado de Ricord (1928–2005, Panama), linguist & academic
- Charlotte Riddell (1832–1906, Iran/Persia/England), fiction wr.
- Elizabeth Riddell (1910–1998, Australia), poet & col.
- Maria Riddell (1772–1808, West Indies/Scotland), poet, travel wr. & naturalist
- Lola Ridge (1873–1941, Australia/United States), poet & editor
- Laura Riding (1901–1991, United States), poet, critic & fiction wr.
- Brigitte Riebe (b. 1935, Germany), nv.
- Ane Riel (b. 1971, Denmark), ch. wr.
- Alifa Rifaat (1930–1996, Egypt), fiction wr.
- Anna Rankin Riggs (1835–1908, United States), non-f. ed.
- Catherine Rihoit (b. 1950, France), nv. & biographer
- Rikei (理慶, 1530–1611, Japan), poet & calligrapher
- Denise Riley (b. 1948, England), poet & philosopher
- Lucinda Riley (1966–2021, Ireland), fiction wr.
- Joan Riley (b. 1958, Jamaica/England), nv.
- Mary Roberts Rinehart (1876–1958, United States), nv., pw. & poet
- Susanne Ringell (b. 1955, Finland), wr. & actor
- Signe Rink (1936–2009, Denmark), wr. & ethnologist
- Luise Rinser (1911–2002, Germany), nv., autobiographer & ch. wr.
- Paloma del Río (b. 1960, Spain), sports wr.
- Dorothy Ripley (1767–1831, England/United States), religious wr.
- Mary A. Ripley (1831–1893, United States), wr.
- Enriqueta Compte y Riqué (1866–1949, Uruguay), ch. wr. & educator
- Anne Isabella Thackeray Ritchie (1837–1919, England), nv.
- Sara Rittenhouse Brown (1854-1938, United States), non-f. wr.
- Alice Rivaz (1901–1998, Switzerland), fiction wr. & es. in French
- María Jesús Alvarado Rivera (1878–1971, Peru), social activist
- Giovanna Rivero (b. 1972, Bolivia), fiction wr.
- Viviana Rivero (b. 1966, Argentina), wr. & nv.
- Christine de Rivoyre (1921–1919, France), nv.

=== Ro–Rz ===
- Marion Roach (fl. 1980s, United States), non-f. wr.
- Alba Roballo (1908–1996, Uruguay), poet & politician
- Nesca Robb (1905–1976, Northern Ireland), biographer & poet
- Sarah Fraser Robbins (1911–2002, United States), wr. & natural historian
- Antoinette Henriette Clémence Robert (1797–1872, France), nv. & pw.
- Carolina de Robertis (b. 1975, England/United States), nv.
- Eigra Lewis Roberts (b. 1939, Wales), pw. & nv. in Welsh
- Emma Roberts (1794–1840, England), travel wr. & poet
- Kate Roberts (1891–1985, Wales), fiction wr. in Welsh
- Michèle Roberts (b. 1949, England), nv. & poet
- Margaret Roberts (1937–2017, South Africa), wr. & herbalist in English
- Nina Roberts (living, France), wr.
- Nora Roberts (pen name J. D. Robb, b. 1950, United States), nv.
- Catherine Robertson (b. 1966, New Zealand), nv. & broadcaster
- E. Arnot Robertson (1903–1961, England), nv.
- Lisa Robertson (b. 1961, Canada/Newfoundland), poet
- Anne Isabella Robertson (c. 1830–1910, Ireland), nv. & suffragist
- Amber E. Robinson (1867-1961, United States), educator, postmaster, poet, reporter, social reformer
- Eden Robinson (b. 1968, Canada/Newfoundland), fiction wr.
- Hilary Robinson (b. 1972, Isle of Man), ch. wr.
- Leora Bettison Robinson (1840–1914, United States), wr. & educator
- Marilynne Robinson (b. 1943, United States), nv.
- Mary Robinson (1757–1800, England), poet, nv. & actor
- Kim Robinson-Walcott (b. 1956, Jamaica), poet & editor
- Aïcha Mohamed Robleh (b. 1965, Djibouti), wr.
- Mireya Robles (b. 1934, Cuba/United States), wr. & nv.
- Lucia St. Clair Robson (living, United States), nv.
- Lelia P. Roby (1848–1910, United States), wr.
- Charlotte Roche (b. 1978, England/Germany), nv.
- Mazo de la Roche (1885–1961, Canada/Newfoundland), nv.
- Regina Maria Roche (1764–1845, Ireland), nv.
- Sophie von La Roche (1730–1807, Germany), nv.
- Anne de La Roche-Guilhem (1644–1707/1710, France), fiction wr.
- Christiane Rochefort (1917–1998, France), nv.
- Catherine Des Roches (1542–1587, France), poet
- Madeleine Des Roches (c. 1520–1587, France), poet
- Esther Rochon (b. 1948, Canada/Newfoundland), science fiction nv.
- Ana María Rodas (b. 1937, Guatemala), col. & poet
- Edith Rode (1879–1956, Denmark), nv. & col.
- Carolyn Rodgers (1940–2010, United States), poet
- Carmen Rodríguez (b. 1948, Chile/Canada/Newfoundland), wr., poet & activist
- Debbie Rodriguez (living, United States), wr.
- Fátima Rodríguez (b. 1961, Spain), wr., translator, professor
- Jesusa Rodríguez (b. 1955, Mexico), stage wr.
- Judith Rodriguez (1936–2018, Australia), poet
- Silvia Rodríguez Villamil (1939–2003, Uruguay), historian, feminist, wr., activist
- Maria Rodziewiczówna (1863–1944, Poland), political wr. & landowner
- Jill Roe (1940–2017, Australia), historian, academic & wr.
- Ruth Margarete Roellig (1878–1969, Germany), non-f. & travel wr.
- Astrid Roemer (1947–2026, Suriname/Netherlands), nv., pw. & poet
- Helena Roerich (1879–1955, Russia/Soviet Union), theosophist & mystic
- Diodata Saluzzo Roero (1774–1840, Italy), poet, pw. & fiction wr.
- Else Roesdahl (b. 1942, Denmark), archaeologist & historian
- Monique Roffey (b. 1965, Trinidad), nv. & mem.
- Rosamaría Roffiel (b. 1945, Mexico), poet & nv.
- Christina Rogberg (1832–1907, Sweden), court mem.
- Noëlle Roger (1874–1953, Switzerland), nv. & biographer in French
- Emma Winner Rogers (1855–1922, United States) – wr., speaker, suffragist
- Sophie Rogge-Börner (1878–1955, Germany), wr. & journalist
- Kathrin Röggla (b. 1971, Austria/Austria-Hungary), pw., es. & poet
- Begum Rokeya (1880–1932, India), wr. & activist
- Winétt de Rokha (1892–1951, Chile), poet
- Betty Roland (1903–1996, Australia), stage & ch. wr. & nv.
- Dominique Rolin (1913–2012, Belgium), nv. in French
- Adelaide Day Rollston (1854–1941, United States), wr., nv. & poet
- Eugenia Romanelli (b. 1972, Italy), nv. & biographer
- Lalla Romano (1906–2001, Italy), nv. & poet
- Sophia Romero (living, Philippines/United States), nv.
- Emma Romeu (living, Cuba/Mexico), nature & ch. wr.
- Robin Romm (living, United States), wr.
- Hanna Rönnberg (1862–1946, Finland/Denmark), painter & fiction wr. in Swedish
- Nathalie Ronvaux (b. 1977, Luxembourg), poet & pw. in French
- Daphne Rooke (1914–2009, South Africa), fiction wr. in English
- Sally Rooney (b. 1991, Ireland), fiction wr., poet & es.
- Margaret Roper (1505–1544, England), translator
- Ginny Rorby (b. 1944, United States), YA nv.
- Amanda McKittrick Ros (1860–1939, Iran/Persia/Northern Ireland), nv. & poet
- Emanuela Da Ros (living, Italy), ch. wr.
- Helvy Tiana Rosa (b. 1970, Indonesia), pw. & fiction wr.
- Amira de la Rosa, (1895–1974, Colombia), col., fiction wr., poet & pw.
- Ninotchka Rosca (b. 1946, Philippines), wr. & activist
- Heather Rose (b. 1964, Australia), nv.
- Martha Parmelee Rose (1834–1923, United States), non-f.
- Henrietta Rose-Innes (b. 1971, South Africa), fiction wr. in English
- Petrona Rosende (1797–1893, Argentina), poet & col.
- Chava Rosenfarb (1923–2011, Poland/Canada/Newfoundland), poet, nv. & Hc. survivor
- Barbara Rosiek (1959–2020, Poland), wr., poet & psychologist
- Joan Rosier-Jones (b. 1940, New Zealand), fiction & non-f. wr. & pw.
- Alice Grant Rosman (1887–1961, Australia), nv.
- Anna Rosmus (b. 1960, Germany), historian
- Tatiana de Rosnay (b. 1961, France/England), fiction wr. & biographer
- Martha Parmelee Rose (1834–1923, United States), non-f. wr., journalist, social reformer
- Anna Ross (1773–?, England), opera pw. & actor
- Leone Ross (b. 1969, England), fiction wr. & academic
- Orna Ross (b. 1960, Ireland), fiction & non-f. wr. & poet
- Nancy Wilson Ross (1901–1986, United States), nv.
- Somerville & Ross (Edith Somerville, 1858–1949, & Violet Florence Martin, 1862–1915, Ireland), fiction wr.s; The Irish R. M.
- Mary Jane O'Donovan Rossa (1845–1916, Ireland), poet & activist
- Rossana Rossanda (1924–2020, Italy), non-f. wr.
- Maria Rosseels (1916–2005, Belgium), nv. in Flemish
- Christina Rossetti (1830–1894, England), poet
- Veronica Rossi (b. 1973, United States), YA nv.
- Judith Rossner (1935–2005, United States), nv.
- Evdokiya Rostopchina (1811–1858, Russia), poet
- Stella Rotenberg (1916–2013, Austria/Austria-Hungary), poet
- Friederike Roth (b. 1948, Germany), pw.
- Veronica Roth (b. 1988, United States), nv.
- Augustine De Rothmaler (1859–1942, Belgium), pedagogue, translator, non-f. wr.
- Maria Elizabeth Rothmann (1875–1975, South Africa), nv. & non-f. wr. in Afrikaans
- Hannah Rothschild (b. 1962, England), wr., philanthropist & filmmaker
- Angélique de Rouillé (1756–1840, Belgium), correspondent in French
- Marie-Anne de Roumier-Robert (fl. 18th century), science fiction wr.
- Anne Rouse (b. 1954 United States/England), poet
- Alma Routsong (Isabel Miller, 1924–1996, United States), nv.
- Léonie Rouzade (1839–1916, France), nv. and feminist
- Jennifer Rowe (b. 1948, Australia), nv.
- Jane Helen Rowlands (1891–1955, Wales), scholar & evangelist
- Mary Rowlandson (1635–1711, United States), mem.
- Rosemarie Rowley (b. 1942, Ireland), poet & feminist
- J. K. Rowling (b. 1965, England/Scotland), nv.; Harry Potter
- Susanna Rowson (1762–1824, England/United States), nv., poet & pw.
- Hannie Rouweler (b. 1951, Netherlands), poet
- Margaret Rowlett (1897–1963), children's book writer
- Tania Roxborogh (b. 1965, New Zealand), fiction & parenting wr.
- Susanna Roxman (1946–2015, Sweden/England), wr., poet & critic
- Anuradha Roy (b. 1967, India), nv.
- Anusree Roy (b. 1982, India/Canada/Newfoundland), pw. & librettist
- Arundhati Roy (b. 1961, India), nv.; The God of Small Things
- Gabrielle Roy (1909–1983, Canada/Newfoundland), nv. & col.
- Kamini Roy (1864–1933, India), poet & feminist
- Lucinda Roy (b. 1955, United States/England), nv.
- Nilanjana Roy (b. c. 1971, India), fiction & food wr.
- Kristína Royová (1860–1936, Austria/Austria-Hungary/Czechoslovakia/Czech Republic), nv., poet & religious wr. in Slovak
- Heleen van Royen (b. 1965, Netherlands), nv.
- S. J. Rozan (b. 1950, United States), crime wr.
- Pascale Roze (b. 1954, Vietnam/France), pw. & nv.
- Ru Zhijuan (茹志鵑, 1925–1998, China), fiction wr.
- Isabel de los Ángeles Ruano (b. 1945, Guatemala), poet & writer
- Bernice Rubens (1928–2004, Wales), nv.
- Baņuta Rubess (b. 1956, Canada/Newfoundland), pw.
- Dina Rubina (b. 1953, Soviet Union/Russia), wr.
- Renate Rubinstein (1929–1990, Germany/Netherlands), wr. & col.
- Berta Ruck (1878–1978, Wales), nv. & mem.
- Jacqueline Rudet (b. 1962, England), pw.
- Margot Ruddock (1907–1951, Ireland), poet
- Anne Rudloe (1947–2012, United States), marine biologist & Buddhist
- Kathy Rudy (b. 1956, United States), women's studies and theology
- Helga Ruebsamen (1934–2016, Netherlands), wr.
- Alice Rühle-Gerstel (1894–1943, Germany/Mexico), wr. and psychologist
- Wanda Sieradzka de Ruig (1923–2008, Poland/Netherlands), poet & screenwriter
- Julia Nava de Ruisánchez (1883–1964, Mexico), es. & col.
- Muriel Rukeyser (1913–1980, United States), feminist poet
- Siti Rukiah (1927–1996, Dutch East Indies/Indonesia), poet & nv.
- Lupe Rumazo (b. 1933, Ecuador), fiction wr. & es.
- Katherine Rundell (b. 1987, England), ch. wr. & pw.
- Fredrika Runeberg (1807–1879, Finland), nv. in Swedish
- Eva Runefelt (b. 1953, Sweden), nv. & poet
- Kristina Rungano (b. 1963, Zimbabwe), poet & fiction wr.
- Rona Rupert (1934–1995, South Africa), ch. & YA, wr. in Afrikaans
- Prima Rusdi (b. 1967, Indonesia), screenwriter & arts writer
- Oka Rusmini (b. 1967, Indonesia), poet & fiction & ch. wr.
- Joanna Russ (1937–2011, United States), fiction wr. & es.
- Diana E. H. Russell (1938–2020, South Africa/United States), feminist wr. & activist
- Dora Isella Russell (1925–1990, Argentina/Uruguay) poet & journalist
- Frances Theresa Peet Russell (1873–1936, United States), English literature
- Karen Russell (b. 1981, United States), fiction wr.
- Doina Ruști (b. 1957, Romania), nv. & screenwriter
- Rose Rwakasisi (b. 1945, Uganda), editor, fiction wr. & educator
- Gig Ryan (b. 1956, Australia), poet
- Kay Ryan (b. 1945, United States), poet & educator
- Marah Ellis Ryan (1860–1934, United States), nv.
- Nan Ryan (1936–2017, United States), nv.
- Meda Ryan (living, Ireland), historian
- Roma Ryan (b. 1950, Northern Ireland), poet & lyricist
- Maria Rybakova (b. 1973, Soviet Union/Russia), fiction wr.
- Carina Rydberg (b. 1962, Sweden), nv.
- Kaisu-Mirjami Rydberg (1905–1959, Finland), wr. & politician
- Elisabeth Rynell (b. 1954, Sweden), poet & nv.
- Elizabeth Ryves (1750–1797, Iran/Persia/England), poet
- Elena Rzhevskaya (1919–2017, Soviet Union/Russia), mem. & non-f. wr.

== S ==
=== Sa–Se ===
- Nawal el-Saadawi (1931–2021, Egypt), feminist & fiction wr.
- Astrid Saalbach (b. 1955, Belgium), pw. & nv.
- Carola Saavedra (b. 1973, Brazil), nv.
- Etelvina Villanueva y Saavedra (1897–1969, Bolivia), poet & educator
- Mariana de Carvajal y Saavedra (1620–1670, Spain), nv.
- Kristina Sabaliauskaitė (b. 1974, Lithuania), nv. & art historian
- María Herminia Sabbia y Oribe (1883–1961, Uruguay), poet
- Isabel Sabogal (b. 1958, Peru), nv. & poet
- Irina Saburova (1907–1979, Latvia/Germany), fiction wr. in Russian
- Padma Sachdev (1940–2021, India), poet & nv.
- Lessie Sachs (1897–1942, Germany/United States), poet
- Nelly Sachs (1891–1970, Germany), poet & pw.; 1966 Nobel Prize in Literature
- Vita Sackville-West (1892–1962, England), wr., poet & gardener
- Mary Sadler (b. 1941, South Africa), nv.
- Anna T. Sadlier (1854–1932, Canada), wr. & translator
- Mary Anne Sadlier (1920–2003, Iran/Persia/Canada/Newfoundland), fiction wr.
- Izabela Sadoveanu-Evan (1870–1941, Romania), critic & poet
- Shadi Sadr (b. 1974, Iran/Persia), es. & lawyer
- Nina Mikhailovna Sadur (b. 1950, Soviet Union/Russia), fiction wr. & pw.
- Elif Safak (b. 1971, Turkey/Ottoman Empire), wr.
- Tahereh Saffarzadeh (1936–2008, Iran/Persia), poet & academic
- Françoise Sagan (1935–2004, France), pw., nv. & screenwriter
- Mamta Sagar (b. 1966, India), Kannada poet & pw.
- Lorna Sage (1943–2001, England), academic, critic & author
- Ana María Martínez Sagi (1907–2000, Spain/France), poet & feminist
- Megumu Sagisawa (鷺沢萠, 1968–2004, Japan), nv. & pw.
- Nayantara Sahgal (b. 1927, India), nv. & correspondent
- Sarojini Sahoo (b. 1956, India), feminist & fiction wr.
- Nandini Sahu (b. 1973, India), poet & folklorist in English
- Rieko Saibara (西原理恵子, b. 1964, Japan), manga creator
- Saigū no Nyōgo (斎宮女御, 929–985, Japan), poet
- Amina Said (b. 1953, Tunisia/France), poet, fiction wr. & es.
- Titie Said (1935–2011, Dutch East Indies/Indonesia), nv.
- Fumi Saimon (柴門ふみ, b. 1957, Japan), manga creator
- Stéphanie Félicité du Crest de Saint-Aubin (1746–1830, France), nv., pw. & ch. wr.
- Catherine Dorothée de Saint-Pierre (1743–?, France), letter writer
- Maria de Villegas de Saint-Pierre (1870–1941, Belgium), nv. in French
- Vefa de Saint-Pierre (1872–1967, France), nv., poet & explorer
- Karina Sainz Borgo (b. 1982, Venezuela), nv. & non-f. wr.
- Pirkko Saisio (b. 1949, Finland), wr. & actor
- Mayu Sakai (酒井まゆ, b. 1982, Japan), manga creator
- Widad Sakakini (1913–1991, Syria), fiction wr. & es.
- Io Sakisaka (咲坂伊緒, living, Japan), manga creator
- Anna Sakse (1905–1981, Latvia/Soviet Union), fiction wr.
- Momoko Sakura (さくらももこ, 1965–2018, Japan), manga creator
- Shino Sakuragi (桜木紫乃, b. 1965, Japan), fiction wr.
- Kanoko Sakurakoji (桜小路かのこ, living, Japan), manga creator
- Erica Sakurazawa (桜沢エリカ, b. 1963, Japan), manga creator
- Arja Salafranca (b. 1971, Spain/South Africa), poet & fiction wr. in English
- Nina Salaman (1877–1925, England), poet
- Minna Salami (b. 1978, Finland/Nigeria), non-f. wr., col.
- Virginia Brindis de Salas (1908–1958, Uruguay), poet
- Fanny Zampini Salazar (1853–1931, Belgium/Italy), social wr.
- Excilia Saldaña (1946–1999, Cuba), poet & ch. wr.
- Marta Salgado (b. 1947, Chile), non-f. wr.
- Nino Salia (1898–1992, Georgia (Caucasus)/France), historian
- Vibeke Salicath (1861–1921, Denmark), philanthropist & feminist
- Zdena Salivarová (1933–2025, Czechoslovakia/Czech Republic/Canada/Newfoundland), nv.
- Blanaid Salkeld (1880–1959, Ireland), poet, pw. & salonnière
- Lotte Salling (b. 1964, Denmark), ch. wr.
- Eva Sallis (Eva Hornung, b. 1964, Australia), nv.
- Sally Salminen (1906–1976, Finland/Denmark), nv. in Swedish
- Jessica Amanda Salmonson (b. 1950, United States), fiction wr. & es.
- Rosa Julieta Montaño Salvatierra (b. 1946, Bolivia), feminist
- Lydie Salvayre (b. 1948, France), wr.
- Preeta Samarasan (living, Malaysia/United States), fiction wr.
- Cecilia Samartin (b. 1961, Cuba/United States), wr. & psychologist
- Magdalena Samozwaniec (1894–1972, Poland), fiction wr.
- Fiona Sampson (b. 1968, England), poet & editor
- Fiona Samuel (b. 1961, Scotland/New Zealand), pw.
- Rhian Samuel (b. 1944, Wales), wr. on music
- María Anna Águeda de San Ignacio (1695–1756, Mexico), religious wr. & abbess
- María Josefa Acevedo Sánchez (1803–1861, Colombia), wr.
- María Teresa Sánchez (1918–1994, Nicaragua), poet & fiction wr.
- Matilde Sánchez (b. 1958, Argentina), wr. & col.
- Socorro Sánchez (1830–1899, DR), journalist
- Sonia Sanchez (b. 1934, United States), poet, pw. & ch. wr.
- Milcha Sanchez-Scott (b. 1953, United States), pw.
- George Sand (1804–1876, France), nv. & pw.
- Virginia Sandars (1828–1922, Ireland), fiction wr.
- Margit Sandemo (1924 – 2018, Norway), fiction wr.
- Dorothy Lucy Sanders (1907–1987, Australia), nv.
- Carmen Barajas Sandoval (1925–2014, Mexico), biographer
- Mari Sandoz (1896–1966, United States), fiction wr. & biographer
- Elspeth Sandys (b. 1940, New Zealand), fiction & non-f. wr. & poet
- Barbara Sanguszko (1718–1791, Poland), poet & moralist
- Parinoush Saniee (living, Iran/Persia), nv.
- Indira Sant (1914–2000, India), poet
- Miêtta Santiago (1903–1995, Brazil), poet, lawyer & feminist
- Miriam Defensor Santiago (1945–2016, Philippines), social science wr.
- Pura Santillan-Castrence (1905–2007, Philippines), es. in English
- Abidemi Sanusi (living, Nigeria/England), nv.
- Mithu Sanyal (born 1971, Germany), non-f. wr. & nv.
- Rahel Sanzara (1894–1936, Germany), nv. and dancer
- Sapphire, pen name of Ramona Lofton (b. 1950, United States), nv. & poet
- Sappho (c. 630–570 BC, Ancient Greece), poet in Greek
- Graciela Sapriza (b. 1945, Uruguay), historian & educator
- Thouria Saqqat (1935–1952, Morocco), ch. wr.
- Nafija Sarajlić (1893–1970, Turkey/Ottoman Empire/Yugoslavia), fiction wr.
- Cristina Saralegui (b. 1948, Cuba/United States),
- Francisca Sarasate (1853-1922, Spain), fiction wr., non-f. wr., poet
- Dipti Saravanamuttu (b. 1960, Sri Lanka/Australia), poet & col.
- Tibors de Sarenom (c. 1130 – post-1198, France), poet in Occitan
- Georges Sari (1925–2012, Greece), nv. & ch. wr.
- Beatriz Sarlo (b. 1942, Argentina), critic & non-f. wr.
- Noo Saro-Wiwa (b. 1976, England/Nigeria), travel wr.
- Nathalie Sarraute (1900–1999, Russia/France), nv. & es.
- Albertine Sarrazin (1937–1967, France), nv.
- Nathalie Sarraute (1900–1999, Russia/France), mem. & biographer
- Homa Sarshar (living, Iran/Persia/United States), wr. & feminist
- Ratna Sarumpaet (b. 1948, Indonesia), pw. & activist
- May Sarton (1912–1995, Belgium/United States), poet, nv. & mem.
- Sehba Sarwar (living, Pakistan/United States), es., poet & fiction wr.
- Tomoko Sasaki (佐々木知子, b. 1965, Japan), nv. & lawyer
- Marjane Satrapi (1969–2026, Iran/France), graphic nv.
- Šatrijos Ragana (1877–1930, Lithuania), fiction wr.
- Krupabai Satthianadhan (1862–1894, India), nv.
- Gerd Grønvold Saue (1930–2022, Norway), critic, nv. & hymnist
- Stephanie Saulter (living, Jamaica), science fiction wr.
- Henriette Sauret (1890–1976, France) poet, non-f. wr.
- Mary Stebbins Savage (1850-1915, United States), wr., poet
- Geneviève Savalette (1735–1795, France), playwright.
- Tanya Savicheva (1930–1944, Soviet Union), child diarist
- Sharon Savoy (living, United States), wr.
- Ruth Sawyer (1880–1970, United States), nv. & ch. wr.
- Aline Sax (b. 1984, Belgium), ch. & YA wr. in Flemish
- Robin Sax (b. c. 1971, United States), crime wr. & col.
- Dorothy L. Sayers (1893–1957, England), mystery wr. & es.
- Isabelle Sbrissa (b. 1971, Switzerland), poet & pw. in French
- Alcira Soust Scaffo (1924–1997, Uruguay), poet & educator
- Nelle Scanlan (1882–1968, New Zealand), nv.
- Patricia Scanlan (b. 1956, Ireland), fiction wr. & poet
- Bente Scavenius (b. 1944, Denmark), art writer & critic
- Igiaba Scego (b. 1974, Italy), wr,, journalist & activist
- Oda Schaefer (1900–1988, Germany), poet & col.
- Susan Fromberg Schaeffer (1940–2011, United States), nv. & poet
- Margo Scharten-Antink (1868–1957, Netherlands), poet
- Riana Scheepers (b. 1957, South Africa), ch. & fiction wr. & poet in Afrikaans
- Caroline Schelling (1763–1809, Germany), es. & correspondent
- Els de Schepper (b. 1965, Belgium), wr. & actor in Flemish
- Sophie von Scherer (1817–1876, Austria/Austria-Hungary), nv.
- Stacy Schiff (b. 1961, United States), non-f. wr. & col.
- Johanna Schipper (b. 1967, Taiwan/France), fiction wr.
- Mineke Schipper (b. 1938, Netherlands), fiction & non-f. wr.
- Dorothea von Schlegel (1764–1839, Germany), nv.
- Sylvia Schlettwein (b. 1975, Namibia), wr., teacher & critic
- Eva Schloss (b. 1929, Austria/Austria-Hungary), mem. & Hc. survivor
- Anka Schmid (b. 1961, Switzerland/Germany), screenwriter in German
- Annie M. G. Schmidt (1911–1995, Netherlands), songwriter & ch. wr.
- Elke Schmitter (b. 1961, Germany), nv. & poet
- Pat Schneider (1934–2020, United States), wr., poet & editor
- Diane Schoemperlen (b. 1954, Canada/Newfoundland), fiction wr.
- Elisabeth of Schönau (c. 1129–1164, Germany), visionary in Latin
- Patricia Schonstein (b. 1952, Zimbabwe/South Africa), nv., poet & ch. wr. in English
- Jane Johnston Schoolcraft (1800–1842, United States), poet & fiction wr.
- Amalie Schoppe (1791–1858, Germany), ch. wr.
- Claudia Schoppmann (b. 1958, Germany), historian & social wr.
- Solveig von Schoultz (1907–1996, Finland), poet, pw. & ch. wr. in Swedish
- Martina Schradi (b. 1972, Germany), writer and cartoonist
- Adele Schreiber-Krieger (1872–1957, Austria/Austria-Hungary), feminist wr. & politician
- Olive Schreiner (1855–1920, South Africa), nv. & political wr. in English
- Angelika Schrobsdorff (1927–2016, Germany), pw., nv. & actor
- Rikke Schubart (b. 1966, Denmark), wr. & film scholar
- Helga Schubert (b. 1940, Germany), fiction, non-f., ch. wr. and academic
- Ossip Schubin (1854–1934, Austria/Austria-Hungary), nv.
- Julianne Schultz (b. 1956, Australia), non-f. wr. & academic
- Anna Maria van Schurman (1607–1678, Germany/Netherlands), poet, scholar & painter
- Barbara Schurz (b. 1973, Austria/Austria-Hungary), wr. & pw.
- Jenefer Shute (living, South Africa/United States), nv.
- Christine Schutt (b. 1948, United States), fiction wr.
- Carolina Schutti (b. 1976, Austria/Austria-Hungary), fiction & non-f. wr.
- Brigitte Schwaiger (1949–2010, Austria/Austria-Hungary), nv.
- Amy Schwartz (1954–2023, United States), ch. wr.
- Marie Sophie Schwartz (1819–1894, Sweden), nv.
- Sibylla Schwarz (1621–1638, Germany), poet
- Simone Schwarz-Bart (b. 1938, France), pw. & nv.
- Annemarie Schwarzenbach (1908–1942, Switzerland), travel wr. in German
- Samanta Schweblin (b. 1978, Argentina), fiction wr.
- Monique Schwitter (b. 1972, Switzerland), fiction wr. in German
- Sandra Scofield (b. 1943 United States), nv., es. & critic
- Ann Scott (b. 1965, France), nv.
- Caroline Lucy Scott (1784–1857, England), nv. & religious wr.
- Cathy Scott (b. 1950s, United States), true crime wr. & biographer
- Jane Scott (c. 1779–1839, England), pw.
- Margaret Scott (1934–2005, Australia), poet, critic & academic
- Mary-anne Scott (living, New Zealand), ch. & YA wr. & musician
- Mary Scott (1888–1979, New Zealand), nv.
- Mary McKay Scott (1851-1932, Canada), nv., non-f. wr.
- Robyn Scott (b. 1981, England/New Zealand), mem.
- Rosie Scott (1948–2017, New Zealand/Australia), nv.
- Madeleine de Scudéry (1607–1701, France), nv.
- Jocelynne Scutt (b. 1947, Australia), non-f. wr. & lawyer
- Mary Seacole (1805–1881, England/Jamaica), autobiographer & nurse
- Jessie L. Seal (1864-1946, United States), non-f. wr.
- Nicole Sealey (b. 1979, US), poet
- Molly Elliot Seawell (1860–1916, United States), es. & fiction wr.
- Leïla Sebbar (b. 1941, Algeria/France), nv. & autobiographer
- Alice Sebold (b. 1963, United States), nv.
- Olga Sedakova (b. 1949, Soviet Union/Russia), poet
- Amy Sedaris (b. 1961, United States), screenwriter & actor
- Catharine Sedgwick (1789–1867, United States), nv.
- Ekaterina Sedia (b. 1970, Soviet Union/United States), nv. & poet
- Lisa See (b. 1955, China/United States), nv.
- Wilhelmina Seegmiller (1866–1913, Canada/United States), wr, illustrator & art teacher
- Sara Sefchovich (b. 1949, Mexico), nv. & academic
- Edith Segal (1902–1997, United States), poet & songwriter
- Lore Segal (b. 1928), fiction & ch. wr.
- Marta Segarra (b. 1963, Spain), es.
- Nakisanze Segawa (living, Uganda), poet & nv.
- Anna Seghers (1900–1983, Germany), nv.
- Alinah Kelo Segobye (fl. 2000s, Botswana), activist & archaeologist
- Mabel Segun (b. 1930, Nigeria), poet, pw., fiction & ch. wr.
- Countess of Ségur (1799–1874, Ru/France), nv.
- Anne de Seguier (fl. 1583, France), poet & salonnière
- Dubravka Sekulić (b. 1980, Serbia), wr. & architect
- Isidora Sekulić (1877–1958, Serbia), nv.
- Taiye Selasi (b. 1979, Nigeria/Ghana/Gold Coast), fiction wr.
- Pınar Selek (b. 1971, Turkey/Ottoman Empire/France), sociologist
- Esther Seligson (1941–2010, Mexico), fiction wr., es. & poet
- Yoshiko Sembon (せんぼんよしこ, b. 1928, China/Japan), screenwriter
- Odete Semedo (b. 1959, Guinea-Bissau), wr. & educator
- Mala Sen (1947–2011, India), biographer
- Nabaneeta Dev Sen (1938–2019, India), poet, fiction wr. & academic
- Eulalie de Senancour (1791–1876, France), fiction wr.
- Fama Diagne Sène (b. 1969, Senegal), nv. & poet
- Julia Rice Seney (1853–1915, United States), non-f. wr.
- Mallika Sengupta (1960–2011, India), poet
- Poile Sengupta (b. 1948, India), pw. & ch. wr.
- Somini Sengupta (fl. 2000s, b. India), journalism, non-fiction wr.
- Olive Senior (b. 1941, Jamaica), poet & fiction wr.
- Danzy Senna (b. 1970, United States), nv.
- Raquel Señoret (1922–1990, Chile), poet
- Iryna Senyk (1926–2009, Ukraine), poet
- Seo Hajin (서하진, b. 1960, Korea), fiction wr.
- Ha Seong-nan (하성란, b. 1967, Korea), wr.
- Kim Seon-wu (김선우, b. 1970, Korea), poet
- Ruta Sepetys (b. 1967, Lithuania/United States), fiction wr.
- Perla Serfaty (b. 1944, Morocco/France/Canada), non-f. wr.
- Dolores Gortázar Serantes (1872–1936, Sp.), nv. & non-f. wr.
- Matilde Serao (1856–1927, Greece/Italy), nv. in Italian
- Kate Seredy (1899–1975, Hungary/United States), ch. wr. & illustrator
- Clara Sereni (1946–2018, Italy), autobiographer & fiction wr.
- Gitta Sereny (1921–2012, Austria/Austria-Hungary/England), biographer & non-f. wr. in German & English
- Cella Serghi (1907–1992, Romania), nv. & ch. wr.
- Anna Lidia Vega Serova (b. 1968, Russia/Cuba), poet & fiction & ch. wr.
- Namwali Serpell (b. 1980, Zambia), fiction wr.
- Elisa Serrana (1930–2012, Chile), nv. & feminist
- Emilia Serrano y García (1834-1923, Spain), travel wr.
- Marcela Serrano (b. 1951, Chile), nv.
- Nina Serrano (b. 1934, United States), poet, wr. & storyteller
- Yolanda García Serrano (b. 1958, Spain), screenwriter
- Coline Serreau (b. 1947, France), screenwriter & pw.
- Sabiha Sertel (1895–1968, Turkey/Ottoman Empire/Soviet Union), political wr.
- Kadija Sesay (living, England), fiction wr., poet & editor
- Ruth Huntington Sessions (1859–1946), mem.
- Henriett Seth F. (b. 1980, Hungary), poet, wr. & musician
- Anya Seton (1904–1990, United States), nv.
- Cynthia Propper Seton (1926–1982, United States), nv. & es.
- Julia Seton (1862-1950, United States), wr. on religion
- Diane Setterfield (b. 1964, England), nv.
- Mary Lee Settle (1918–2005, United States), nv. & mem.
- Marie de Rabutin-Chantal, marquise de Sévigné (1626–1696, France), correspondent
- Anna Seward (1747–1809, England), poet
- Anna Sewell (1820–1887, England), nv.; Black Beauty
- Elizabeth Sewell (1919–2001, England/United States), poet, nv. & academic
- Elizabeth Missing Sewell (1815–1906, England), wr. on religion & education
- Anne Sexton (1928–1974, United States), poet
- Margaret Wilkerson Sexton (living, United States), nv.
- Miranda Seymour (b. 1948, England), fiction & non-f. wr.
- Carole Seymour-Jones (1943–2015, Wales), biographer & education wr.

=== Sf–Sk ===
- Ippolita Maria Sforza (1446–1484, Italy), correspondent & poet
- Mary Ann Shaffer (1934–2008, United States), wr., editor & librarian
- Louisa Shafia (b. 1968/1970, United States), food wr. & chef
- Marietta Shaginyan (1888–1982, Russia/Soviet Union), fiction wr. & activist
- Sara Shagufta (1954–1984, Pakistan), poet
- Bina Shah (b. 1972, Pakistan), fiction wr. & col.
- Madhuri R. Shah (fl. 20th century, India), education wr. & poet
- Noorul Huda Shah (b. 1951, Pakistan), pw. & politician
- Ryhaan Shah (living, Guyana), nv.
- Husne Ara Shahed (living, Bangladesh), wr. & educator
- Salma Shaheen (b. 1954, Pakistan), poet & fiction wr.
- Qaisra Shahraz (living, Pakistan/England), nv. & scriptwriter
- Mahasti Shahrokhi (living, Iran/Persia), nv. & poet
- Ruchoma Shain (1914–2013, United States), rebbetzin, wr. & teacher
- Siba Shakib (living, Iran/Persia/United States), wr. & activist
- Parveen Shakir (1952–1995, Pakistan), poet & civil servant
- Sepideh Shamlou (b. 1968, Iran/Persia), nv.
- Kamila Shamsie (b. 1973, Pakistan/England), fiction wr.
- Muneeza Shamsie (b. 1944, Pakistan), es.
- Shan Sa (山颯, b. 1972, China/France), nv. in Chinese & French
- Eileen Shanahan (1901–1979, Ireland), poet
- Elizabeth Shane (1877–1951, Ireland), poet, pw. & violinist
- Ntozake Shange (1948–2018, United States), pw. & nv.
- Mary Eulalie Fee Shannon (1824–1855, United States), poet
- Shangguan Wan'er (上官婉兒, c. 664–710, China), poet, wr. & imperial consort
- Shantichitra (b. 1978, India), nv. & academic
- Jo Shapcott (b. 1953, England), poet, editor & lecturer
- Olga Shapir (1850–1916, Russia), fiction wr. & feminist
- Chava Shapiro (1876–1943, Russia/Soviet Union), wr. in Ukrainian
- Laura Shapiro (b. 1946, United States), journalist & author
- Margarita Sharapova (b. 1962, Soviet Union/Russia), fiction wr.
- Emma Augusta Sharkey (1858–1802, United States), wr., col. & nv.
- Niamh Sharkey (living, Ireland), ch. writer & illustrator
- Jane Sharp (c. 1641–71, England), wr. on midwifery
- Harriette Lucy Robinson Shattuck (1850–1937, United States), wr.
- Elizabeth Shaw (1920–1992, Ireland), ch. wr. & illustrator
- Helen Lilian Shaw (1913–1985, New Zealand), fiction wr. & poet
- Tina Shaw (b. 1961, New Zealand), nv. & travel wr.
- Tatiana Shchepkina-Kupernik (1874–1952, Russia), fiction wr, pw. & poet
- Nessa Ní Shéaghdha (1916–1993, Iran/Persia), academic
- Miranda Shearer (b. 1982, England), non-f. wr. & columnist
- Laurie Sheck (b. 1953, United States), poet & nv.
- Eileen Sheehan (b. 1963, Ireland), poet
- Helena Sheehan (b. 1944, Ireland), philosopher & historian
- Alice Sheldon (1915–1987, United States), fiction wr.
- Daphne Sheldrick (1934–2018, Kenya), wr. on animal husbandry
- Shanta Shelke (1922–2002, India), poet & nv.
- Mary Shelley (1797–1851, England), nv.; Frankenstein
- Bonnie Shemie (b. 1949, United States/Canada/Newfoundland), ch. wr. & illustrator
- Shen Rong (谌容, b. 1936, China), nv. & mem.
- Shen Shanbao (沈善宝, 1808–1862, China), poet & biographer
- Preeti Shenoy (b. 1971, India), nv. & social wr.
- Nan Shepherd (1893–1981, Scotland), nv. & poet
- Verene Shepherd (b. 1951, Jamaica), academic
- Natalia Sheremeteva (1714–1771, Russia), mem.
- Betsy Sheridan (1758–1837, Ireland), diarist
- Frances Sheridan (1724–1766, Ireland), nv. & pw.
- Shahla Sherkat (b. 1956, Iran/Persia), feminist wr.
- Dorothy Sherrill (1901–1990, United States), ch. wr. & illustrator
- Kate Brownlee Sherwood (1841–1914, United States), poet & col.
- Marika Sherwood (1937–2025, England), historian
- Mary Martha Sherwood (1775–1851, England), ch. wr.
- Narmala Shewcharan (living, Guyana/England), nv. & poet
- Gamar Sheyda (1881–1933, Azerbaijan), poet
- Tomoka Shibasaki (柴崎友香, b. 1973, Japan), fiction wr.
- Adania Shibli (b. 1974, Palestine), fiction wr. & es.
- Carol Shields (1935–2003 United States/Canada/Newfoundland), nv.; The Stone Diaries
- Yoshiko Shigekane (重兼芳子, 1927–1963, Japan), fiction wr.
- Karuho Shiina (椎名軽穂, b. 1975, Japan), manga creator
- Izumi Shikibu (和泉式部, b. c. 976, Japan), poet
- Murasaki Shikibu (紫式部, c. 973–1014 or 1025, Japan), nv. & poet; The Tale of Genji
- Princess Shikishi (式子内親王, died 1201, Japan), poet
- Michiru Shimada (島田満, 1959–2017, Japan), anime screenwriter
- Rio Shimamoto (島本理生, b. 1983, Japan), fiction wr.
- Aki Shimazaki (アキシマザキ, b. 1954, Canada/Newfoundland), nv. & academic
- Reiko Shimizu (清水玲子, b. 1963, Japan), manga creator
- Takako Shimura (志村貴子, b. 1973, Japan), manga creator
- Kang Shin-jae (강신재, 1924–2001, Korea), nv., es. & pw.
- Shin Kyeong-nim (신경림, b. 1936, Korea), wr.
- Shin Kyung-sook (신경숙, b. 1963, Korea), fiction wr.
- Jan Shinebourne (b. 1947, Guyana/England), nv.
- Mayu Shinjo (新條まゆ, b. 1973, Japan), manga creator
- Sharon Shinn (b. 1957, United States), nv.
- Setsuko Shinoda (篠田 節子, b. 1955, Japan), fiction wr.
- Chie Shinohara (篠原千絵, living, Japan), manga creator
- Irma Shiolashvili (b. 1974, Georgia (Caucasus)), poet & col.
- Kazuko Shiraishi (白石かずこ, b. 1931, Canada/Newfoundland), poet
- Zandokht Shirazi (1909–1953, Iran/Persia), poet & activist
- Warsan Shire (b. 1988, England), wr., poet & editor
- Tanya Shirley (b. 1976, Jamaica), poet
- Shirome (白女, 10th century, Japan), poet
- Maria Shkapskaya (1891–1952, Russia/Soviet Union), poet & col.
- Susy Shock (b. 1968, Argentina), wr., singer & actor
- Ann Allen Shockley (b. 1927, United States), journalist & author
- Dora Adele Shoemaker (1873–1962, United States), poet & playwright
- Sei Shōnagon (清少納言, 965–1010, Japan), wr. & poet; The Pillow Book
- Lola Shoneyin (b. 1974, Nigeria), nv. & poet
- Dora Sigerson Shorter (1866–1918, Ireland), poet & sculptor
- Fredegond Shove (1889–1949, England), poet
- Elaine Showalter (b. 1941, United States), critic, feminist wr.
- Shu Ting (舒婷, b. 1952, China), poet
- Ana María Shua (b. 1951, Argentina), fiction & ch. wr., poet & pw.
- Shunzei's daughter (藤原俊成女, c. 1171 – c. 1252, Japan), poet
- Jenefer Shute (living, South Africa), nv.
- Marie-Louise Sibazuri (b. 1960, Burundi), wr.
- Gabriella Sica (b. 1950, Italy), poet
- Anja Sicking (b. 1965, Netherlands), fiction wr.
- Myra Sidharta (歐陽春梅, b. 1927, China/Indonesia), psychologist
- Bapsi Sidhwa (b. 1938, Pakistan/United States), nv.
- Mary Sidney (1561–1621, England), pw. & poet
- Gonnie Siegel (1928–2005, United States), wr.
- Raija Siekkinen (1953–2004, Finland), wr.
- Catherine of Siena (1347–1380, Italy), nun, philosopher & theologian
- Stella Sierra (1917–1997, Panama), poet and prose wr.
- Fatou Niang Siga (1932–2022, Senegal), social wr.
- Steinvör Sighvatsdóttir (died 1271, Iceland), poet & politician
- Fríða Á. Sigurðardóttir (1940–2010, Iceland), fiction wr.
- Jakobína Sigurðardóttir (1918–1994, Iceland), poet, nv. & ch. wr.
- Lilja Sigurdardottir (b. 1972, Iceland), crime wr. & pw.
- Ragna Sigurðardóttir (b. 1962, Iceland), wr. & artist
- Steinunn Sigurðardóttir (b. 1950, Iceland), poet & nv.
- Turið Sigurðardóttir (b. 1946, Faroe Islands), literary historian
- Yrsa Sigurðardóttir (b. 1963), crime & ch. wr.
- Birte Siim (b. 1945, Denmark), political writer
- Joyce Sikakane (b. 1943, South Africa), col. & autobiographer in English
- Joan Silber (b. 1945, United States), fiction wr.
- Malla Silfverstolpe (1782–1861, Sweden), mem. & salonnière
- Melanie Silgardo (b. 1956, India), poet
- Leslie Marmon Silko (b. 1948, United States), Laguna Pueblo descent fiction wr. & poet
- Jindeok of Silla (진덕여왕, fl. 647–654, Korea), poet & queen
- Diná Silveira de Queirós (1911–1922, Brazil), nv., pw., es. & ch. wr.
- Makeda Silvera (b. 1955, Canada/Newfoundland), fiction wr.
- Alessandra Silvestri-Levy (b. 1972, Brazil), art wr.
- Sim Yunkyung (심윤경, b. 1972, Korea), nv.
- Elizabeth Simcoe (1762–1850, UK), diarist
- Hazel Simmons-McDonald (b. 1947, Saint Lucia), poet & academic
- Ana María Simo (living, Cuba/United States), pw. & nv. in English
- Maria Simointytär (fl. late 17th century, Finland), poet
- Kate Simon (1912–1990, Poland/United States), autobiographer & non-f. wr.
- Germaine Simon (1921–2012, Luxembourg), nv. in German
- Ieva Simonaitytė (1897–1978, Lithuania), nv.
- Katherine Call Simonds (1865–?, United States), musician, singer, author, composer, social reformer
- Ifigenija Zagoričnik Simonović (b. 1953, Yugoslavia/Slovenia), poet & ch. wr.
- Paullina Simons (b. 1963, Soviet Union/United States), nv.
- Dorothy Simpson (b. 1933, Wales), nv.
- Helen Simpson (1897–1940, Australia), nv., pw. & historian
- Ruth Simpson (1926–2008, United States), wr.
- Laura Sims (living, United States), nv. & poet
- Salla Simukka (b. 1981, Finland), nv. & critic
- Hourya Benis Sinaceur (b. 1940, Morocco), philosopher
- Jo Sinclair (pen name of Ruth Seid, 1913–1995, United States), wr.
- May Sinclair (1862–1946, England), fiction wr. & poet
- Helena Sinervo (b. 1961, Finland), poet & nv.
- Ansuyah Ratipul Singh (1917–1978, South Africa), wr. in English & physician
- Nalini Singh (b. 1977, New Zealand), nv.
- Rajkumari Singh (1923–1979, Guyana), poet, pw. & activist
- Sunny Singh (b. 1969, India), fiction & non-f. wr.
- Sarah Singleton (b. 1966, England), nv. & ch. wr.
- Kabita Sinha (1931–1999, India), poet & nv.
- Mridula Sinha (1942–2020, India), nv. & public figure
- Shumona Sinha (b. 1973, India/France), nv.
- Johanna Sinisalo (b. 1958, Finland), science fiction & fantasy wr.
- Nancy Siraisi (1932–2026, United States), non-f.
- Lyubov Sirota (b. 1956, Ukraine), poet, wr. & pw.
- Elinor Sisulu (b. 1958, Zimbabwe/South Africa), biographer & activist
- Lakambini Sitoy (b. 1969, Philippines), nv. & teacher
- Edith Sitwell (1887–1964, England), poet
- Genet Sium (b. 1960s, Eritrea), novelist
- Sivasankari (b. 1942, India), nv.
- Rhoda Cosgrave Sivell (1874–1962, Iran/Persia/Canada/Newfoundland), poet & rancher
- Maj Sjöwall (1935–2020, Sweden), mystery nv.
- Susan Skarsgard (b. 1954, American), non-f.
- Staka Skenderova (1830–1891, Turkey/Ottoman Empire/Austria/Austria-Hungary), wr. in Serbian
- Michelle Cruz Skinner (b. 1965, Philippines), wr. & educator
- Ann Masterman Skinn (1747–1789, England), nv.
- Rebecca Skloot (b. 1972, United States), science wr.
- Sofija Skoric (living, Serbia/Canada/Newfoundland), activist & wr.
- Simona Škrabec (b. 1968, Yugoslavia/Spain), critic & es.
- Amalie Skram (1846–1905, Norway), nv. & feminist
- Rūta Skujiņa (1907–1964, Latvia), poet
- Vendela Skytte (1608–1627, Sweden), wr.

=== Sl–Sz ===
- Cecylia Słapakowa, (ca.1900–ca.1942, Lithuania/Poland), journalist and translator
- Sharon Slater (living, Ireland), local historian
- Karin Slaughter (b. 1971, United States), crime wr.
- Olga Slavnikova (b. 1957, Soviet Union/Russia), nv. & critic
- Barbara Sleigh (1906–1982, England), ch. wr.
- Esphyr Slobodkina (1908–2002, Russia/United States), ch. wr. & illustrator
- Żanna Słoniowska (b. 1978, Ukraine/Poland), nv.
- Gillian Slovo (b. 1952, South Africa/England), nv., pw. & mem.
- Anna Smaill (b. 1979, New Zealand), poet & nv.
- Elizabeth Smart (1913–1986, Canada/Newfoundland), nv. & poet
- Dorothea Smartt (b. 1963, England), poet
- Jane Smiley (b. 1948, United States), nv.
- Alexandra Smirnova (1809–1882, Russia/France), mem.
- Ali Smith (b. 1962, Scotland), nv.
- Amanda Smith (1837–1915, United States), evangelist & autobiographer
- Betty Smith (1896–1972, United States), nv.
- Charlene Leonora Smith (living, South Africa), biographer & social wr. in English
- Charlotte Turner Smith (1749–1806, England), poet & nv.
- Dodie Smith (1896–1990, England), nv. & pw.; I Capture the Castle
- Doris Buchanan Smith (1934–2002, United States), ch. nv.
- Doris E. Smith (1919–pre–1994, Ireland), nv.
- Georgina Castle Smith (1845–1933, England), ch. wr. & nv.
- Jeanie Oliver Davidson Smith (1836–1925, United States), poet, romancist
- Lillian Smith (1897–1966, United States), nv. & critic
- Lura Eugenie Brown Smith (1864–?, United States), journalist, newspaper ed. & wr.
- Maggie Smith (b. 1977, United States), poet, editor & wr.
- Martha Pearson Smith (1836–?, United States), poet
- Mary Bell Smith (1818–1894, United States), educator, social reformer, & wr.
- Patti Smith (b. 1946, United States), poet, artist & songwriter
- Pauline Smith (1882–1959, South Africa), fiction wr. & pw. in English
- Stevie Smith (1902–1971, England), poet & nv.
- Tracy K. Smith (b. 1972, United States), poet & educator
- Zadie Smith (b. 1975, England), fiction wr. & es.
- Elizabeth Smither (b. 1941, New Zealand), poet & fiction wr.
- Annie M. P. Smithson (1873–1948, Ireland), fiction & nursing wr.
- Saundra Smokes (1954–2012, United States), col. & pw.
- Breda Smolnikar (b. 1941, Yugoslavia/Slovenia), nv. & ch. wr.
- Cherry Smyth (b. 1960, Iran/Persia/England), academic, critic & poet
- Ciara Elizabeth Smyth (living, Ireland), pw.
- Anja Snellman (b. 1954, Finland), nv. & poet
- Laura J. Snyder (b. 1964, United States), historian & biographer
- Yan-kit So (1933–2001, China/England), cookery wr.
- So Young-en (서영은, b. 1943, Korea), fiction wr.
- Angelina Soares (1910–1985, Brazil), feminist wr.
- Alawiya Sobh (b. 1955, Lebanon), col. & fiction wr.
- Sofia Soboleva (1840–1884, Russia), fiction & ch. wr.
- Gaele Sobott (b. 1956, Australia), fiction, ch. & non-f. wr.
- Krishna Sobti (1925–2019, India), fiction wr. & es.
- Susana Soca (1906–1959, Uruguay), poet
- Edith Södergran (1892–1923, Finland), poet in Swedish
- Zulu Sofola (1935–1995, Nigeria), pw. & pw.
- Hedvig Sohlberg (1858-1937, Finland), non-f. wr.
- Ružica Sokić (1934–2013, Serbia), wr. & actor
- Sara Solá de Castellanos (1890–after 1928, Argentina), poet, nv., pw., lyricist
- Adeola Solanke (living, England/Nigeria), pw. & screenwriter
- Amalia Domingo Soler (1835–1909, Spain), nv. & spiritist
- Carmen Soler (1924–1985, Paraguay/Argentina), politician & poet
- Frances-Anne Solomon (b. 1966, England/Canada/Newfoundland), broadcasting pw.
- Laura Solomon (1974–2019, New Zealand/England), nv., pw. & poet
- Elizabeth Solopova (b. 1965, England), philologist & academic
- Polyxena Solovyova (1867–1924, Russia), poet & illustrator
- Armonía Somers (1914–1994, Uruguay), fiction wr. & educator
- Edith Somerville (1858–1949, Ireland), nv. & co-author
- Angela Sommer-Bodenburg (b. 1948, Germany), ch. wr.
- Son Bo-mi (선보미, b. 1980, Korea), fiction wr.
- Cathy Song (b. 1955, United States), poet
- Susan Sontag (1933–2004, United States), es. & nv.
- Oh Soo-yeon (오수연, b. 1964, Korea), wr. & es.
- Pilar Sordo (b. 1965, Chile), psychologist & wr.
- Tracy Sorensen (1963–2025, Australia), nv. & academic
- Fuyumi Soryo (b. 1959, Japan), manga wr.
- Dido Sotiriou (1909–2004, Greece), nv. & pw.
- Carmelina Soto (1916–1994, Comoros), poet
- María de Zayas y Sotomayor (1590–1647 or 1661, Spain), nv.
- Katariina Souri (b. 1968, Finland), nv., col. & artist
- Noémia de Sousa (1926–2002, Mozambique), poet
- Auta de Souza (1876—1901, Brazil), poet
- Eunice de Souza (1940–2017, India), poet, critic & nv.
- Fatou Ndiaye Sow (1937–2004, Senegal), poet & ch. wr.
- Sevgi Soysal (1936–1976, Turkey/Ottoman Empire), fiction wr.
- Edibe Sözen (b. 1961, Turkey/Ottoman Empire), sociologist
- Isabelle Spaak (b. 1960, Belgium/France), fiction & non-f. wr. in French
- Svetlana Spajić (b. 1971, Serbia), activist & translator
- Muriel Spark (1918–2006, Scotland/England), nv.
- Elisavet Spathari (living, Greece), archaeologist & wr.
- Maria Luisa Spaziani (1923–2014, Italy), poet
- Terry Spear (living, United States), romance nv.
- Clara E. Speight-Humberston (1862-1936, Canada), non-f. wr.
- Catherine Helen Spence (1825–1910, Australia), nv. & reformer
- Eleanor Spence (1928–2008, Australia), ch. wr.
- Ruth Elizabeth Spence (1890-1982, Canada), non-f. wr.
- Vanessa Spence (b. 1961, Jamaica), nv.
- Anne Spencer (1882–1975, United States), poet
- Elizabeth Spencer (1921–2018, United States), fiction wr.
- Dale Spender (1943–2023, Australia), feminist wr. & scholar
- Jean Maud Spender (J. M. Spender, 1901–1970), crime wr.
- Vanessa Spence (b. 1961, Jamaica), nv.
- Leonora Speyer (1872–1956, United States), poet & violinist
- Hilde Spiel (1911–1990, Austria/Austria-Hungary), es. & critic
- Sabina Spielrein (1885–1942, Russia/Uganda), psychoanalyst
- Lina Spies (b. 1939, South Africa), poet in Afrikaans
- Erica Spindler (1957, United States), nv.
- Magdalena Spínola (1896–1991, Guatemala), poet & educator
- Dana Spiotta (b. 1966, United States), nv.
- Julia Spiridonova (Yulka, b. 1972, Bulgaria), nv. & screenwriter
- Jela Spiridonović-Savić (1891–1974, Serbia), poet & fiction wr.
- Lize Spit (b. 1980, Belgium), nv. in Flemish
- Andrea Spofford (b. 1986, United States), poet & es.
- Harriet Elizabeth Prescott Spofford (1835–1921, United States), fiction wr. & poet
- Eintou Pearl Springer (b. 1944, Trinidad), poet & pw.
- Tricia Springstubb (b. 1950, United States), ch. wr.
- Susan Spungen (living, United States), food wr., editor, & food stylist
- Katja Špur (1908–1991, Austria/Austria-Hungary/Yugoslavia), ch. wr. & poet
- Johanna Spyri (1827–1901, Switzerland), ch. wr. in German; Heidi
- Biljana Srbljanović (b. 1970, Serbia), pw.
- Atima Srivastava (b. 1961, India), fiction wr. & film director
- Cornelia Laws St. John (?–1902, United States), poet, biographer
- Cynthia Morgan St. John (1852–1919, United States), Wordsworthian, book collector, & wr.
- Lauren St John (b. 1966, Zimbabwe), ch. nv.
- Marilyn Stablein (b. 1946, United States), poet, es. & fiction wr.
- Ilse von Stach (1879–1941, Germany), pw., nv. & poet
- Eva Stachniak (b. 1952, Poland/Canada/Newfoundland), fiction wr.
- Germaine de Staël (1766–1817, Switzerland/France), nv.
- Jean Stafford (1915–1978, United States), fiction wr.
- Pernilla Stalfelt (b. 1962, Sweden), ch. wr. & illustrator
- Albena Stambolova (b. 1957, Bulgaria), psychologist & nv.
- Gaspara Stampa (1532–1554, Italy), poet
- Elizabeth Cady Stanton (1815–1902, United States), col. & es.
- Patience Stapleton (1861-1893, United States), nv. and journalist
- Margarita Stāraste-Bordevīka (1914–2014, Latvia), ch. wr.
- Freya Stark (1893–1993, England), travel wr.
- Nicolette Stasko (b. 1950, Australia), poet, nv. & non-f. wr.
- Marie Šťastná (b. 1981, Czechoslovakia/Czech Republic), poet
- Lucienne Stassaert (b. 1936, Belgium), poet in Flemish
- Lilian Staveley (1878–1928, England), wr. & mystic
- Christina Stead (1902–1983, Australia), fiction wr.
- Betsey Ann Stearns (1830–1914, United States), non-f. wr.
- Margret Steckel (b. 1934, Germany/Luxembourg), nv. in German
- Irène Stecyk (b. 1937, Belgium), fiction wr. & poet
- Danielle Steel (b. 1947, United States), nv.
- Flora Annie Steel (1847–1929, England), nv.
- Esther Baker Steele (1835–1911, United States), textbook wr. & editor
- Anja Štefan (b. 1969, Yugoslavia/Slovenia), ch. wr.
- Mirjana Stefanović (1939–2021, Serbia), wr.
- Erla Stefánsdóttir (1935–2015, Iceland), story wr.
- Marie Henriette Steil (1898–1930, Luxembourg), fiction wr. & col. in German & French
- Alicia Steimberg (1933–2012, Argentina), fiction wr. & translator
- Charlotte von Stein (1742–1827, Germany), pw.
- Evaleen Stein (1863–1923, United States), poet, children's wr., limner
- Gertrude Stein (1874–1946, United States), fiction wr., pw. & poet
- Gisela Steineckert (b. 1931, Germany), radio pw. and screenwriter
- Clara Steinitz (1852–1931), wr.
- Kristín Steinsdóttir (b. 1946, Iceland), ch. wr. & pw.
- Ginka Steinwachs (b. 1942, Germany), pw. and educator
- Maria Antonia Scalera Stellini (1634–1704, Italy), poet & pw.
- Carla Stellweg (living, Dutch East Indies/Mexico), art historian
- Agnieszka Stelmaszyk (b. 1978; Poland), writer, novelist
- Eira Stenberg (b. 1943, Finland), pw. & poet
- Joanne Stepaniak (b. 1954, United States), vegan cookery wr.
- Elizabeth Willisson Stephen (1856–1925, United States), nv., poet & wr.
- Māmari Stephens (b. 1970, New Zealand), social wr. & preacher
- Jadene Felina Stevens (1947–2013, United States), poet
- Augusta Stevenson (1869–1976, United States), ch. wr. & teacher
- Margo Taft Stever (living, United States), poet
- Anna Louise Stevnhøj (b. 1963, Denmark), health wr.
- Adela Blanche Stewart (1846–1910, England/New Zealand), autobiographer
- Amanda Stewart (b. 1959, Australia), poet & performer
- Jacqueline Stewart (b. 1970, United States), non-f. wr.
- Jane Agnes Stewart (1860–1944, United States), wr., editor
- Maria W. Stewart (1803–1897, United States), lecturer & col.
- Mary Stewart (1916–2014, England), nv.
- Susan Stewart (b. 1952, United States), poet, professor & critic
- Gabrella Townley Stickney (1850-1942, United States), non-f. wr.
- Maggie Stiefvater (b. 1981, United States), YA fiction wr.
- Isabel Stilwell (b. 1960, Portugal), fiction & ch. wr.
- Ilka Stitz (b. 1960, Germany), nv.
- Cornelia Laws St. John (died 1902, United States), poet, biographer
- Wilma Stockenström (b. 1933, South Africa), poet & prose wr. in Afrikaans
- Cynthia Stockley (1873–1936, South Africa), nv. in English
- Louise Stockton (1838-1914, United States), nv., ss. wr.
- Hilda van Stockum (1908–2006, Netherlands), ch. wr. & artist
- Milica Stojadinović-Srpkinja (1828–1878, Serbia), poet
- Ana Stojanoska (b. 1977, Yugoslavia/North Macedonia), wr. on theater & critic
- Missouri H. Stokes (1838–1910, United States), non-f. wr.
- Maša Stokić (b. 1966, Serbia), pw. & critic
- Maria Engelbrecht Stokkenbech (1759–post-1806, Denmark), wr.
- Catharine Stolberg (1751–1832, Denmark/Germany), countess & wr.
- Ruth Stone (1915–2011, United States), poet
- Marie Stopes (1880–1958, England), wr., paleo-botanist & birth-control advocate
- Alfonsina Storni (1892–1938, Argentina), poet & pw.
- Agnes L. Storrie (1865–1936, Australia), poet & wr.
- Gertrude Story (1929–2014, Canada), poet & short story
- Harriet Beecher Stowe (1811–1836, United States), nv.; Uncle Tom's Cabin
- Mari Strachan (b. 1945, Wales), nv.
- Susan Straight (b. 1960, United States), fiction wr., es. & academic
- Ingela Strandberg (b. 1944, Sweden), poet, ch. wr. & novelist
- Jennifer Strauss (b. 1933, Australia), poet & academic
- Lulu von Strauss und Torney (1873–1956, Germany), poet, fiction wr.
- Hesba Stretton (1832–1911, England), ch. wr.
- Agnes Strickland (1796–1874, England), history wr. & poet
- Sara Stridsberg (b. 1972, Sweden), nv.
- Olga Stringfellow (1923–1995, New Zealand), fiction wr.
- Eva Strittmatter (1930–2011, Germany), poet & ch. wr.
- Rashida Strober (living, United States), pw.
- Gertrude Strohm (1843–1927), American wr.
- Eva Ström (b. 1947, Sweden), poet, nv. & critic
- Margareta Strömstedt (1931−2023, Sweden), wr., journalist & translator
- Eithne Strong (1923–1999, Ireland), poet & fiction wr.
- Elizabeth Strout (b. 1956, United States), fiction wr.
- Flora E. Strout (1867–1962, United States), non-f. wr., lyricist
- Alessandra Macinghi Strozzi (c. 1408–1471, Italy), correspondent
- Antje Rávic Strubel (b. 1974, Germany), fiction & textbook wr.
- Karin Struck (1947–2006, Germany), fiction & social wr.
- Anna Strunsky (1877–1964, Russia/United States), nv. & mem.
- Amelie von Strussenfelt (1803–1847, Sweden), nv. & poet
- Ulrika von Strussenfelt (1801–1873, Sweden), nv.
- Jan Struther (1901–1953, Scotland/England), hymnist & nv.
- Andrea Stuart (b. 1968, Barbados/England), historian & biographer
- Lady Louisa Stuart (1757–1851, England), mem. & correspondent
- Sheila Stuart (1892–1974, Scotland), ch. wr.
- Toni Stuart (b. 1983, South Africa), poet in English
- Heloneida Studart (1932–2007, Brazil), nv., es. & pw.
- Lelde Stumbre (b. 1952, Latvia), pw. & politician
- Sarah Stup (b. 1983, United States), wr.
- Tanja Stupar-Trifunović (b. 1977, Yugoslavia/Bosnia-Herzegovina), poet & fiction wr.
- Jacqueline Sturm (1927–2009, New Zealand), fiction wr.
- Su Hui (蘇蕙, 4th century AD, China), poet
- Su Qing (苏青, 1914–1982, China), es.
- Su Xiaoxiao (蘇小小, c. 470–c. 501, China), poet & courtesan
- Su Xuelin (蘇雪林, 1897–1999, China), scholar
- SuAndi (b. 1951, England), performance poet, wr. & arts curator
- Karla Suárez (b. 1969, Cuba), wr.
- Margareta Suber (1892–1984, Sweden), nv., poet & ch. wr.
- Arundhathi Subramaniam (living, India), poet, biographer & critic
- Vidya Subramaniam (b. 1957, India), fiction wr.
- Lucreția Suciu-Rudow (1859–1900, Austria/Austria-Hungary/Romania), poet
- Olivia Sudjic (b. 1988, Serbia/England), nv.
- Keiko Suenobu (すえのぶけいこ, b. 1979, Japan), manga creator
- Yuki Suetsugu (末次由紀, b. 1975, Japan), manga creator
- Meridel Le Sueur (1900–1996, United States), nv. & col.
- Tea Sugareva (b. 1989, Bulgaria), poet & drama director
- Sugathakumari (1934–2020, India), poet & activist
- Etsu Inagaki Sugimoto (杉本鉞子, 1874–1950, Japan), autobiographer & nv.
- Heo Su-gyeong (허수경, 1964–2018, Korea), poet
- Laurence Suhner (b. 1968, Switzerland), nv. in French & graphic artist
- Laura Jane Suisted (1840–1903, England/New Zealand), fiction wr., col. & poet
- Iliriana Sulkuqi (b. 1951, Albania/United States), poet & col.
- Sara Copia Sullam (1592–1641, Italy), poet & religious wr.
- Deirdre Sullivan (living, Ireland), ch. writer
- Elizabeth Higgins Sullivan (1872–1953. United States, wr., novelist, dramatist
- Jennifer Sullivan (b. 1945, Wales), ch. nv. & critic
- Florence Sulman (1876–1965, England/Australia), non-f. educator
- Sulpicia (fl. 1st century BC, Ancient Rome), poet in Latin
- Sulpicia (fl. 1st century AD, Ancient Rome), satirist in Latin
- Maud Sulter (1960–2008, Scotland), poet, artist & photographer
- Anne Summers (b. 1945, Australia), wr. & col.
- Barbara Summers (1944–2014, United States), wr., educator & model
- Essie Summers (1912–1998, New Zealand), fiction wr. & poet
- Merna Summers (b. 1933, Canada/Newfoundland), fiction wr.
- Barbara Sumner (living, New Zealand), mem. & screenwriter
- Kamala Surayya (1934–2009, India), poet & fiction wr.
- Julia Suryakusuma (b. 1954, India/Indonesia), social wr. & col.
- Jacqueline Susann (1918–1974, United States), nv.
- Astrid Susanto (1936–2006, Indonesia), social wr.
- Polina Suslova (1839–1918, Russia), autobiographer
- Rita Süssmuth (1937–2026, Germany), non-f.
- Efua Sutherland (1924–1996, Ghana/Gold Coast), pw., ch. wr. & pw.
- Esi Sutherland-Addy (living, Ghana/Gold Coast), academician & activist
- Bertha von Suttner (1843–1914, Austria/Austria-Hungary), nv. & Nobel Prize winner
- Han Suyin (周光瑚, 1916–2012, Chile), nv., mem. & es.; A Many-Splendoured Thing
- Henriette de Coligny de La Suze (1618–1673, France), poet
- Eva Švankmajerová (1940–2005, Czechoslovakia/Czech Republic), wr. & artist
- Annakarin Svedberg (b. 1934, Sweden), fiction wr.
- Maria Sveland (b. 1974, Sweden), social analyst
- Hanne Marie Svendsen (b. 1933, Denmark), wr. & broadcaster
- Karolina Světlá (1830–1899, Austria/Austria-Hungary), nv. in Czech
- Alexandra Sviridova (b. 1951, Russia/United States), screenwriter & political wr.
- Anni Swan (1875–1958, Finland), ch. book wr.
- Catharina Charlotta Swedenmarck (1744–1813, Sweden/Finland), pw. & poet in Swedish
- Elinor Sweetman (c. 1861–1922, Ireland), poet
- May Swenson (1913–1988, United States), poet & pw.
- Susie Forrest Swift (1862–1916, United States), editor & wr.
- Anna Świrszczyńska (1909–1984, Poland), poet
- Lucy Robbins Messer Switzer (1844–1922, United States), temperance activist
- Syang (Simone Dreyer Peres, b. 1968, Brazil), erotic wr.
- Karen Syberg (b. 1945, Denmark), wr. & gender researcher
- Sydney, Lady Morgan (1781–1859, Ireland), nv.
- Bobbi Sykes (1943–2010, Australia), poet & wr.
- Khady Sylla (1963–2013, Senegal), nv. & screenwriter
- Vanda Symon (b. 1969, New Zealand), nv.
- Magda Szabó (1917–2007, Hungary), nv., poet & pw.
- Anna Szatkowska (1928–2015, Poland/Switzerland), resistance fighter & autobiographer
- Noémi Szécsi (b. 1976, Hungary), nv.
- Júlia Székely (1906–1986, Hungary), nv. & biographer
- Madelon Szekely-Lulofs (1899–1958, Indonesia/Netherlands), fiction wr.
- Mária Szepes (1908–2007, Hungary), esoteric & science fiction nv.
- Małgorzata Szumowska (b. 1973, Poland), screenwriter
- Edina Szvoren (b. 1974, Hungary), nv., poet & musician
- Wisława Szymborska (1923–2012, Poland), poet

== T ==
=== Ta–Th ===
- Marga T (b. 1943, Indonesia), fiction & ch. wr.
- Gladys Taber (1899–1980, United States), nv. & nature wr.
- Eileen Tabios (b. 1960, Philippines/United States), poet & fiction wr.
- Haruko Tachiiri (たちいりハルコ, b. 1949, Japan), ch. manga creator
- Maria Tacu (1949–2010, Romania), poet & prose wr.
- Chimako Tada (多田智満子, 1930–2003, Japan), poet
- Kaoru Tada (多田かおる, 1960–1999, Japan), manga creator
- Tadano Makuzu (只野真葛, 1763–1825, Japan), socio-political wr.
- Véronique Tadjo (b. 1955, Ivory Coast), poet, nv. & artist
- Pia Tafdrup (b. 1952, Denmark), poet, nv. & pw.
- Gina Marissa Tagasa-Gil (living, Philippines), screenwriter
- Valerie Tagwira (living, Zimbabwe), nv.
- Táhirih (1814 or 1817–1852, Iran/Persia), poet & theologian
- Daina Taimiņa (b. 1954, Latvia), mathematician
- Ise no Taiu (伊勢大輔, early 11th century, Japan), poet
- Princess Tajima (但馬皇女, died 708, Japan), poet
- Judit Dukai Takách (1795–1836, Hungary), poet
- Nobuko Takagi (高樹のぶ子, b. 1946, Japan), fiction wr.
- Rumiko Takahashi (高橋留美子, b. 1957, Japan), manga creator
- Takako Takahashi (高橋たか子, 1932–2013, Japan), fiction wr.
- Yelizaveta Tarakhovskaya (1891–1968, Russia/Soviet Union), poet, pw. & ch. wr.
- Kaoru Takamura (髙村薫, b. 1953, Japan), fiction wr.
- Hinako Takanaga (高永ひなこ, living, Japan), manga creator
- Mitsuba Takanashi (高梨みつば, b. 1975, Japan), manga creator
- Takasue's daughter (菅原孝標女, c. 1008 – post-1059, Japan), travel wr.
- Haneko Takayama (高山羽根子, b. 1975, Japan), fiction wr.
- Kazumi Takayama (高山一実, b. 1994, Japan), fiction & self-help wr.
- Lisa Takeba (竹葉リサ, b. 1983, Japan), screenwriter
- Keiko Takemiya (竹宮惠子, b. 1950, Japan), manga creator
- Hiroko Takenishi (竹西寛子, b. 1929, Japan), fiction wr. & critic
- Kei Takeoka (竹岡圭, b. 1969, Japan), motoring wr.
- Jill Talbot (b. 1970, United States), fiction & non-f. wr. & poet
- Niloufar Talebi (living, England/United States), mem. & librettist
- Maila Talvio (1871–1951, Finland), fiction & non-f. wr.
- Susanna Tamaro (b. 1957, Italy), nv.
- Clotilde Tambroni (1758–1817, Italy), linguist & poet
- Altaír Tejeda de Tamez (1922–2015, Mexico), fiction wr., poet & pw.
- Leilani Tamu (living, New Zealand), poet & politician
- Yumi Tamura (田村由美, living, Japan), manga creator & nv.
- Wassyla Tamzali (b. 1941, Algeria), wr., feminist & politician
- Amy Tan (b. 1952, United States), nv.
- Yellow Tanabe (田辺イエロウ, b. 1990s, Japan), manga creator
- Meca Tanaka (田中メカ, b. 1976), manga wr.
- Mitsu Tanaka (田中美津, b. 1945), feminist wr.
- Shelley Tanaka (living, Canada/Newfoundland), non-f. ch. wr.
- Suna Tanaltay (1933–2021, Turkey/Ottoman Empire), poet & wr.
- Shweta Taneja (living, India), fiction wr.
- Arina Tanemura (種村有菜, b. 1978, Japan), manga creator
- Reay Tannahill (1929–2007, Scotland/England), historian
- Lian Tanner (b. 1951, Australia), ch. wr.
- Goli Taraghi (b. 1939, Iran/Persia), fiction wr.
- Yelizaveta Tarakhovskaya (1891–1968, Russia/Soviet Union), poet, pw. & ch. wr.
- Sooni Taraporevala (b. 1957, India), screenwriter
- Violet Targuse (1884–1937, New Zealand), pw.
- Lisa Ysaye Tarleau (1885–1952, United States), fiction wr.
- Fanny Tarnow (1779–1862, Germany), journal & fiction wr.
- Judith Tarr (b. 1955, United States), wr.
- Trinidad Tarrosa-Subido (1912–1994, Philippines), linguist & poet
- Sofía Tartilán (1829–1888, Spain), fiction wr., es, journalist, ed.
- Donna Tartt (b. 1963, United States), nv.
- Ana Tasić (b. 1978, Serbia), theater critic
- Afzal Tauseef (1936–2014, Pakistan), social wr. & col.
- Franziska Tausig (c. 1895–1989, Austria/Austria-Hungary/China), mem.
- Jemima von Tautphoeus (1807–1893, Iran/Persia/Germany), nv.
- Malvina Tavares (1866–1939, Brazil), poet & anarchist
- Zora Tavčar (b. 1928, Yugoslavia/Italy), fiction wr., es. & poet in Slovenian
- Yōko Tawada (多和田葉子, b. 1960, Japan/Germany), poet & fiction wr.
- Raymonda Tawil (b. 1940, Palestine/Malta), mem.
- Alice Taylor (b. 1938, Ireland), mem. & ch. wr.
- Ann Taylor (1782–1866, England), poet & critic
- Anna Taylor (b. 1982, New Zealand), fiction wr.
- Cory Taylor (1955–2016, Australia), ch. wr. & mem.
- Elizabeth Taylor (1912–1975, England), fiction wr.
- Glenda R. Taylor (b. 1955, United States), scholar & poet
- Grace Taylor (b. c. 1984, New Zealand), poet & academic
- Grace Oladunni Taylor (b. 1937, Nigeria), biochemist
- Jane Taylor (1783–1824, England), poet & nv.
- Jane Taylor (b. 1956, South Africa), political wr, nv. & librettist in English
- Kay Glasson Taylor (Daniel Hamline, 1893–1998, Australia), ch. wr.
- Minnetta Theodora Taylor (1860–1911, United States), poet, lyricist, textbook wr.
- Susie Taylor (1848–1912, United States), teacher & memoir wr.
- Teresia Teaiwa (1968–2017, Kiribati/United States), poet & academic
- Angeline Teal (1842-1913, US), poet, nv., ss. wr.
- Roma Tearne (b. 1954, Sri Lanka/England), nv. & artist
- Sara Teasdale (1884–1933, United States), poet
- Mrs. Bartle Teeling (1851–1906, United Kingdom), wr.
- Teffi (1872–1952, Ru/Soviet Union), poet, pw. & fiction wr.
- Anyte of Tegea (fl. early 3rd century BC, Ancient Greece), poet in Greek
- Nivaria Tejera (1929–2016, Cuba/France), nv.
- Sevim Tekeli (1924–2019, Turkey/Ottoman Empire), science historian
- Latife Tekin (b. 1957, Turkey/Ottoman Empire), nv.
- Sylviane Telchid (1941–2023, Guadeloupe), wr. & translator
- Telesilla (fl. 510 BC, Ancient Greece), poet in Greek
- Olena Teliha (1906–1942, Ru/Soviet Union), poet in Ukrainian
- Janne Teller (b. 1964, Denmark/United States), nv. & es. in English
- Lygia Fagundes Telles (1923–1922, Brazil), fiction wr.
- Ece Temelkuran (b. 1973, Turkey/Ottoman Empire), political wr. & poet
- Edith Templeton (1916–2006, Europe), nv. & travel wr., in English
- Ana Tena (b. 1966, Spain), wr. in Aragonese
- Claudine Guérin de Tencin (1682–1749, France), nv. & salonnière
- Emma Tennant (1937–2017, England), nv.
- Kylie Tennant (1912–1988, Australia), nv., pw. & ch. wr.
- Margaret Tennant (living, New Zealand), historian
- Lourdes Teodoro (b. 1946, Brazil), poet & academic
- Lisa St Aubin de Terán (b. 1953, England), nv. & mem.
- Fanny Tercy (1782-1851, France), nv.
- Laura Terracina (1519 – c. 1577, Italy), poet
- Mary Church Terrell (1863–1954, United States), activist & col.
- Jasmina Tešanović (b. 1954, Serbia), es., fiction wr. & translator
- Josephine Tey (1896–1952, Scotland), mystery nv.
- Hilary Tham (1946–2005, Malaysia/United States), poet
- Najiya Thamir (1926–1988, Syria/Tunisia), fiction wr., es. & radio pw.
- Romila Thapar (b. 1931, India), historian
- Susie Tharu (b. 1943, India), writer & activist
- Celia Thaxter (1835–1894, United States), poet & story wr.
- Julia H. Thayer (1847-1944, United States), poet, hymnist, & educator
- Françoise Thébaud (b. 1952, France), non-f. wr.
- Naseem Thebo (1948–2012, Pakistan), fiction wr. & educator
- Marcia Theophilo (b. 1941, Brazil), poet
- Rama Thiaw (b. 1978, Senegal), screenwriter
- Renata Thiele (living, Poland/Germany), fiction writer
- Marianne Thieme (b. 1972, Netherlands), wr. & politician
- Madeleine Thien (b. 1974, Canada/Newfoundland), fiction wr.
- Angela Thirkell (Leslie Parker, 1890–1961), nv.
- Adrienne Thomas (1897–1980, Germany/Austria/Austria-Hungary), nv.
- Audrey Thomas (b. 1935, Canada/Newfoundland), fiction wr.
- Caitlin Thomas (1913–1994, Wales), mem.
- Chantal Thomas (b. 1945, France), wr. and historian
- Édith Thomas (1909–1970, France), nv. and historian
- Elean Thomas (1947–2004, Jamaica), poet, nv. & activist
- Elizabeth Thomas (1770/1771–1855, England), nv. & religious poet
- Gilles Thomas (1929–1985, France), science fiction wr.
- Gladys Thomas (1934–2022, South Africa), poet & pw.
- Isabel Thomas (living, England), ch. non-f. wr.
- Louie Myfanwy Thomas (1908–1968, Wales), wr. & nv.
- Margaret Thomas (1843–1929, Australia), travel wr., poet & artist
- Ngaire Thomas (1943–2012, New Zealand), autobiographer
- Rosemary Thomas (1901–1961, United States), poet.
- Stephanie Thomas (living, United States), author, public speaker, voice actor, professor
- Clara M. Thompson (1830s–unknown, United States), nv.
- Mrs. E. H. Thompson (fl. 1870s–1900s, United States), wr.
- E. S. L. Thompson (1848–1944, United States), poet, pw, shot story wr.
- Jeanne I. Thompson (living, Bahamas), pw. & lawyer
- Judith Thompson (b. 1954, Canada/Newfoundland), pw.
- Kirsten Moana Thompson (b. 1964, New Zealand), film scholar
- María Luisa Artecona de Thompson (1919–2003, Paraguay), poet & pw.
- Mette Thomsen (b. 1970, Denmark), nv.
- Brynhildur Þórarinsdóttir (b. 1970, Iceland), ch. wr.
- Magdalene Thoresen (1819–1903, Denmark/Norway), poet, fiction wr. & pw.
- Samantha Thornhill (living, Trinidad), poet & critic
- Valgerður Þóroddsdóttir (b. 1989, Iceland), poet
- Margaret Farrand Thorp (1891–1970, United States), wr. & academic
- Rose Hartwick Thorpe (1850–1938, United States), poet & wr.
- Kirsten Thorup (b. 1942, Denmark), poet & fiction wr.
- Torfhildur Þorsteinsdóttir (1845–1918, Iceland), fiction wr.
- Kerstin Thorvall (1925–2010, Sweden), nv.
- Ólína Þorvarðardóttir (b. 1958, Iceland), poet & social scientist
- Hester Thrale (Mrs Piozzi, 1741–1821, Wales/England), diarist & wr.
- María Lilja Þrastardóttir (b. 1986, Iceland), col. & activist
- Holly Throsby (b. 1978, Australia), nv.
- Ketty Thull (1905–1987, Luxembourg), cookery writer in German
- Katherine Cecil Thurston (1874–1911, Ireland), nv.
- Martha L. Poland Thurston (1849–1898, United States), social leader, philanthropist, & wr.
- Johanna Thydell (b. 1980, Sweden), nv.

=== Ti–Tz ===
- Tian Yuan (田原, b. 1985, China), nv. & songwriter
- Annie O. Tibbits (1871–1957, England), nv., journalist, short story wr.
- María Dhialma Tiberti (1928–1987, Argentina), nv. & poet
- Jindra Tichá (b. 1937, Czechoslovakia/Czech Republic/New Zealand), fiction wr. & academic
- Anna-Clara Tidholm (b. 1946, Sweden), ch. wr. & illustrator
- Tie Ning (鐵凝, b. 1957, China), fiction wr.
- Dorothea Tieck (1799–1841, Germany), Shakespeare translator
- Edith Tiempo (1919–2011, Philippines), poet & wr. in English
- Mary Tighe (1772–1810, Iran/Persia/England), poet
- Eeva Tikka (b. 1939, Finland), wr.
- Märta Tikkanen (b. 1935, Finland), wr. in Swedish
- Mary Wilder Tileston (1843–1934, United States), wr., editor, compiler
- Stella Tillyard (b. 1957, England/United States), history wr. & academic
- Lydia H. Tilton (1839–1915, United States), educator, activist, journalist, poet, lyricist
- Petronella Johanna de Timmerman (1723–1786, Netherlands), poet & scientist
- Marguerite Tinayre (1831–1895, France), fiction wr.
- Timrava (1867–1951, Austria/Austria-Hungary/Czechoslovakia/Czech Republic), fiction wr. & pw. in Slovak
- Lillian Tindyebwa (living, Uganda), wr.
- Annette Tison (b. 1942, France), wr. and architect
- Kata Tisza (b. 1980, Russia/Hungary), nv. in Hungarian
- Liudmila Titova (fl. 1940s, Ukraine), poet
- Manjit Tiwana (b. 1947, India), poet
- Maya Tiwari (b. 1952, Guyana/United States), social & religious writer
- Totilawati Tjitrawasita (1945–1982, Indonesia), fiction wr.
- Nino Tkeshelashvili (1874–1956, Georgia (Caucasus)/Soviet Union), ch. wr. & suffragist
- Miriam Tlali (1933–2017), South Africa), nv. in English
- Fatima Tlisova (b. 1966, Soviet Union/Russia), political wr.
- Keiko Tobe (戸部けいこ, 1957–2010, Japan), manga creator
- Lily Tobias (1887–1984, Wales), nv., pw. & activist
- Yana Toboso (枢やな, b. 1984, Japan), manga creator
- Ada Josephine Todd (1858–1904, United States), wr.
- Ruth D. Todd (1878–?, United States), fiction wr.
- Miriam Toews (b. 1964, Canada/Newfoundland), nv.
- Ekaterine Togonidze (b. 1981, Georgia (Caucasus)), nv. & activist
- Laura Tohe (b. 1952, United States), wr.
- Marianne du Toit (b. 1970, South Africa), prose wr. in English
- Olga Tokarczuk (b. 1962, Poland), wr. & poet; 2018 Nobel prizewinner
- Viktoriya Tokareva (b. 1937, Soviet Union/Russia), fiction & screenwriter
- Hari Tokeino (時計野は, b. 1979, Japan), manga creator
- Arzu Toker (b. 1952, Turkey/Ottoman Empire/Germany), political wr. in German
- M. B. M. Toland (1925-1895, United States), poet
- Aida Toledo (b. 1952, Guatemala), poet & fiction wr.
- Natalia Toledo (b. 1968, Mexico), poet in Spanish & Zapotec
- Beatrix Lucia Catherine Tollemache (1840–1926, England), fiction wr., poet & translator
- Natalia Tolstaya (1943–2010, Soviet Union/Russia), fiction wr.
- Sophia Tolstaya (1844–1919, Russia), diarist
- Tatyana Tolstaya (b. 1951, Soviet Union/Russia), wr. & TV presenter
- Velta Toma (1912–1999, Latvia/Canada/Newfoundland), poet
- Consuelo Tomás (b. 1957, Panama), pw., poet & nv.
- Glen Tomasetti (1929–2003, Australia), songwriter, nv. & poet
- Taeko Tomioka (1935–2023, Japan), nv. & poet
- Constance Tomkinson (1915–1995, England, we. & actress
- Angharad Tomos (b. 1958, Wales), wr. & activist
- Canan Topçu (b. 1965, Turkey/Ottoman Empire/Germany), academic
- Angela Topping (b. 1954, England), poet, critic & wr.
- Elena Topuridze (1922–2004, Soviet Union/Georgia (Caucasus)), philosopher & non-f. wr.
- Fatma Aliye Topuz (1862–1936, Turkey/Ottoman Empire), nv.
- Cécile Tormay (1876–1937, Hungary), wr. & activist
- Lucrezia Tornabuoni (1425–1482, Italy), poet
- Rita Tornborg (b. 1926, South Africa/Sweden), fiction wr.
- Ana Rosa Tornero (1907–1984, Bolivia), wr. & reformer
- Malú Huacuja del Toro (b. 1961, Mexico), nv., pw. & screenwriter
- Francesca Torrent (1881-1958, Spain), wr. & poet
- Anabel Torres (b. 1948, Comoros), poet
- Elena Torres (1893–1970, Mexico), political wr. & educator
- Raymunda Torres y Quiroga (?–?, Argentina), wr. & activist
- Wal Torres (b. 1950, Brazil), sexologist
- Gabriela Torres Olivares (b. 1982, Mexico), fiction
- Rowena Tiempo Torrevillas (b. 1951, Philippines), poet, fiction wr. & es.
- Maria Antonietta Torriani (1840–1920, Italy), fiction & etiquette wr.
- Alcira Cardona Torrico (1926-2003, Bolivia), writer and poet
- Susana Richa de Torrijos (b. 1924, Panama), es. & educator
- Lucrezia Tornabuoni (1427–1482, Italy), poet, pw. & politician
- Nicole Tourneur (1950–2011, France), nv.
- Jessica Townsend (b. 1985, Australia), ch. wr.
- Ema Tōyama (遠山えま, b. 1981, Japan), manga creator
- Marta Traba (1923–1983, Argentina), art critic & nv.
- Bahaa Trabelsi (b. 1966, Morocco), nv. in French
- Mona Innis Tracy (1892–1959, New Zealand), poet & fiction wr.
- Catharine Parr Traill (1802–1899, England/Canada/Newfoundland), wr. & naturalist
- Trang Thanh Tran, Vietnamese American horror wr.
- Barbara Trapido (b. 1941, South Africa/England), nv.
- Maria von Trapp (1905–1987, Austria/Austria-Hungary/United States), wr.
- Clara Augusta Jones Trask (1839–1905, United States), wr.
- P. L. Travers (1889–1996, Australia/England), ch. wr.
- Carmen Clemente Travieso (1900–1983, Venezuela), biographer & col.
- Maria Treben (1907–1991, Austria/Austria-Hungary), herbalist
- Catherine Tregenna (living, Wales), pw. & scriptwriter
- Melesina Trench (1768–1827, Ireland), wr, poet & diarist
- Ulla Trenter (1936–2019, Sweden), wr.
- Natasha Trethewey (b. 1966, United States), poet
- Jill Trevelyan (b. 1963, New Zealand), art scholar
- Rachel Trezise (b. 1978, Wales), fiction & non-f. wr.
- Soti Triantafyllou (b. 1957, Greece), nv. & col.
- Adriana Trigiani (living, Italy/United States), wr. & filmmaker
- Barbara Margaret Trimble (Margaret Blake, B. M. Gill, 1921–1995, Wales), thriller wr.
- Sarah Trimmer (1741–1810, England), ch. wr. & critic
- S. K. Trimurti (1912–2008, Dutch East Indies/Indonesia), writer & teacher
- Grace Hyde Trine (1874–1972, United States), pw.
- Nadine Trintignant (b. 1934, France), screenwriter & nv.
- Elsa Triolet (1896–1970, Russia/France), correspondent & nv. in Russian and French
- Geeta Tripathee (b. 1972, Nepal), poet, literary critic & wr.
- Flora Tristan (1803–1844, France), wr., feminist & activist
- Licia Troisi (b. 1980, Italy), fiction wr.
- Frances Trollope (1779–1863, England), nv. & travel wr.
- Joanna Trollope (1943–2025, England), nv.
- Catherine Trotter (1679–1749, Scotland/England), nv., pw. & philosopher
- Trotula (11th–12th century, Spain), wr. on medicine in Latin
- Birgitta Trotzig (1929–2011, Sweden), fiction & non-f. wr.
- Jean Trounstine (b. 1946, United States), activist, wr. & academic
- Una Troy (1910–1993, Ireland), nv. & pw.
- Jagoda Truhelka (1864–1957, Austria/Austria-Hungary/Yugoslavia), wr. & educator
- Meta Truscott (1917–2014, Australia), diarist & historian
- Sojourner Truth (1797–1883, United States), feminist
- Máire Mhac an tSaoi (1922–2021, Ireland), scholar & poet in Irish
- Eleonora Tscherning (1817–1890, Denmark), mem. & painter
- To-wen Tseng (曾多聞, living, China/United States), wr., col. & ch. wr.
- Novuyo Rosa Tshuma (b. 1988, Zimbabwe), fiction wr.
- Mariam Tsiklauri (b. 1960, Soviet Union/Georgia (Caucasus)), poet & ch. wr.
- Masami Tsuda (津田雅美, b. 1970, Japan), manga creator
- Mikiyo Tsuda (つだみきよ, living, Japan), manga creator
- Kikuko Tsumura (津村記久子, b. 1978, Japan), fiction wr.
- Yūko Tsuno (津野 裕子, b. 1966, Japan), comics wr.
- Yūko Tsushima (津島佑子, 1947–2016, Japan), fiction wr., es. & critic
- Marina Tsvetaeva (1892–1941, Soviet Union), poet
- Barbara W. Tuchman (1912–1988, United States), wr. & historian
- Lily Tuck (b. 1938, United States), fiction wr.
- Mary Frances Tyler Tucker (1837–1902, United States), poet
- Kateřina Tučková (b. 1980, Czechoslovakia/Czech Republic), nv.
- Elizabeth Tudor (Lady Hasanova, b. 1978, Azerbaijan), nv.
- Nadia Tueni (1935–1983, Lebanon), poet in French
- Magdalena Tulli (b. 1955, Poland), nv.
- Anastasia Tumanishvili-Tsereteli (1849–1932, Georgia (Caucasus)/Soviet Union), wr., educator & feminist
- Ayfer Tunç (b. 1964, Turkey/Ottoman Empire), fiction wr. & researcher
- Leelo Tungal (b. 1947, Estonia), poet, librettist & ch. wr.
- Eliza Dorothea Cobbe, Lady Tuite (c. 1764–1850, Iran/Persia/England), poet & ch. wr.
- Fadwa Tuqan (1917–2003, Palestine), poet
- Evgenia Tur (1815–1892, Ru), nv. & critic
- Nika Turbina (1974–2002, Ukraine), poet
- Roxane Turcotte (b. 1952, Canada), ch. wr.
- Clorinda Matto de Turner (1852–1909, Peru), fiction & non-f. wr.
- Ethel Turner (1872–1958, Australia), ch. wr.
- Jann Turner (b. 1964, South Africa), nv. & screenwriter in English
- Lilian Turner (1867–1956, Australia), ch. nv.
- Megan Whalen Turner (b. 1965, United States), fantasy wr.
- Telcine Turner-Rolle (1944–2012, Bahamas), pw., poet & educator
- Josipina Turnograjska (1833–1854, Austria/Austria-Hungary), poet & fiction wr. in Slovenian
- Helene Tursten (b. 1954, Sweden), fiction wr.
- Agata Tuszynska (b. 1957, Poland), wr., poet & col.
- Emma Rood Tuttle (1839–1916, United States), wr. & poet
- Flora May Woodard Tuttle (1868–1931, United States), wr. & col.
- Diana Tutton (1915–1991, England), nv.
- Kerima Polotan Tuvera (1925–2011, Philippines), fiction wr. & es.
- Violet Tweedale (1862–1936, Scotland), wr. & poet
- Chase Twichell (b. 1950, United States), poet & professor
- Lizzie Twigg (c. 1882–1933, Ireland), poet
- Sarah Lowe Twiggs (1839–1920, United States), poet
- Hilda Twongyeirwe (living, Uganda), wr. & editor
- Anne Tyler (b. 1941, United States), fiction wr. & critic
- Katharine Tynan (1859–1931, Ireland), nv. & poet
- Aale Tynni (1913–1997, Soviet Union/Finland), poet
- Vasia Tzanakari (b. 1980, Greece), fiction writer

== U ==
- Rosana Ubanell (b. 1958, Spain), nv.
- Bahriye Üçok (1919–1990, Turkey/Ottoman Empire), academic & activist
- Ada Udechukwu (b. 1960, Nigeria), poet & artist
- Miwa Ueda (上田美和, living, Japan), manga creator
- Toshiko Ueda (上田トシコ, 1917–2008, Japan), manga creator
- Kimiko Uehara (上原きみ子, b. 1946, Japan), manga creator
- Brenda Ueland (1891–1985 United States/Norway), wr. & teacher
- Zoila Ugarte de Landívar (1864–1969, Ecuador), editor & suffragist
- Jenny Uglow (b. 1940s, England), biographer
- Dubravka Ugrešić (1949–2023, Yugoslavia/Netherlands), fiction wr. in Croat
- Hebe Uhart (1936–2018, Argentina), fiction wr.
- Uhwudong (어우동, c. 1440–1480, Korea), wr. & poet
- Lesya Ukrainka (1871–1913, Ukraine), poet
- Stefania Ulanowska (Latvia), folklorist
- Adaora Lily Ulasi (b. 1932, Nigeria), nv. & col.
- Leonora Christina Ulfeldt (1621–1698, Denmark), prison autobiographer
- Anya Ulinich (b. 1973, Russia/United States), fiction wr.
- Lyudmila Ulitskaya (b. 1943, Russia), fiction wr.
- Linn Ullmann (b. 1966, Norway), nv. & critic
- Regina Ullmann (1884–1961, Switzerland), poet in German
- Rosina Umelo (b. 1930, Nigeria), fiction & ch. wr.
- Chica Umino (羽海野チカ, living, Japan), manga creator
- Luz María Umpierre (b. 1947, Puerto Rico), poet, critic & activist
- Lily Unden (1908–1989, Luxembourg), poet, painter & concentration camp survivor
- Marie Under (1883–1980, Estonia), poet
- Terry Underwood (b. 1944, Australia), wr.
- Sigrid Undset (1882–1949, Norway), nv.; 1928 Nobel Prize in Literature
- Chika Unigwe (b. 1974, Nigeria), fiction wr.
- Jane Unrue (living, United States), wr. & educator
- Makerita Urale (fl. 1990s, New Zealand), pw. & film director
- Azucena Grajo Uranza (1929–2012, Philippines), fiction wr. & pw.
- Ellen Urbani (b. 1968, United States), wr.
- Joan Ure (1918–1978, Scotland), poet & pw.
- Ofelia Uribe de Acosta (1900–1988, Colombia), suffragist
- Jane Urquhart (b. 1949, Canada/Newfoundland), nv. & poet
- Jessie Urquhart (1890–1948, Australia), nv. & col.
- Julia Urquidi (1926–2010, Bolivia), mem.
- Lourdes Urrea (b. 1954, Mexico), poet, fiction & YA wr.
- Arantxa Urretabizkaia (b. 1947, Spain), nv., screenwriter & poet in Basque
- Matilde Urrutia (1912–1985, Chile), mem.
- Mari Jose Urruzola (1940–2006, Spain), non-f. wr.
- Yuki Urushibara (漆原友紀, b. 1974, Japan), manga creator
- Shereen Usdin (b. 1962, South Africa), non-f. wr. in English
- Carmina Useros (1928–2017, Spain), wr. & artist
- O. V. Usha (b. 1948, India), poet & fiction wr.
- Ayu Utami (b. 1968, Indonesia), fiction wr.
- Kaari Utrio (b. 1942, Finland), nv.
- Sarah Elizabeth Utterson (1781–1851), gothic short story wr.
- Arja Uusitalo (b. 1951, Finland), poet & col.
- Bea Uusma (b. 1966, Sweden), ch. & non-f. wr.
- Uvavnuk (fl. early 20th century, Canada/Newfoundland), Inuit poet
- Pauline Uwakweh (living, Nigeria), ch. & feminist wr.
- Mellie Uyldert (1908–2009, Netherlands), astrologer & wr.
- Buket Uzuner (b. 1955, Turkey/Ottoman Empire), fiction & travel wr.

== V ==
- Elena Văcărescu (1864–1947, Romania), poet, nv. & mem.
- Urvashi Vaid (1958–2022, India/United States), socio-political wr.
- Vaidehi (b. 1945, India), fiction wr., es. & pw.
- Aparna Vaidik (living, India), historian & educator
- Kaajal Oza Vaidya (b. 1966, India), fiction & screenwriter
- Gertrude Vaile (1878–1954, US), non-f. wr.
- Celestine Vaite (b. 1966, Tt), nv.
- Matrena Vakhrusheva (1918–2000, Soviet Union/Russia), Mansi poet & storyteller
- Katri Vala (1901–1944, Finland), poet
- Lobat Vala (b. 1930, Ireland), poet & activist
- Aline Valangin (1889–1986, Switzerland), fiction wr. in German
- Indrė Valantinaitė (b. 1984, Lithuania), poet
- Gisela Valcárcel (b. 1963, Peru), autobiographer
- Olvido García Valdés (b. 1950, Spain), poet & es.
- Zoé Valdés (b. 1959, Cuba), nv. & poet
- Alisa Valdes-Rodriguez (b. 1968, United States), nv. & screenwriter
- Mercedes Valdivieso (1924–1993, Chile), nv.
- Patrizia Valduga (b. 1953, Italy), poet
- Aline Valek (b. 1986, Brazil), wr., nv. & illustrator
- Hannelore Valencak (1929–2004, Austria/Austria-Hungary), nv., poet & ch. wr.
- Elcina Valencia (b. 1963, Colombia), poet & teacher
- Luize Valente (b. 1966, Brazil), nv. & filmmaker
- Elvira Farreras i Valentí (1913–2005, Spain), wr.
- Jean Valentine (1934–2020, United States), poet
- Jenny Valentine (b. 1970, Wales), ch. wr.
- Luisa Valenzuela (b. 1938, Argentina), fiction wr.
- Valérie Valère (1961–1981, France), autobiographer
- Leda Valladares (1919–2012, Argentina), poet & folklorist
- Estrella del Valle (b. 1971, Mexico), poet
- Virginia Vallejo (b. 1949, Comoros/United States), wr. & refugee
- Gunnel Vallquist (1918–2016, Sweden), religious wr. & es.
- Elise Valmorbida (b. 1961, Australia), fiction & non-f. wr.
- P. Valsala (b. 1938, India), fiction wr. & activist
- Maria Valtorta (1897–1961, Italy), poet & religious wr.
- Jennifer Vanasco (b. 1971, United States), col.
- Josephine Van De Grift (1894–1927, United States), wr., col. & pw.
- Jane Vandenburgh (b. 1948, United States), nv., mem. & non-f. wr.
- Vonne van der Meer (b. 1952, Netherlands), fiction wr. & pw.
- Ellen Oliver Van Fleet (1842–1893, United States), poet & hymn wr.
- Martha Van Marter (1839–1931, United States}, ed., nv., & non-f. wr.
- Blanca Varela (1926–2009, Peru), poet
- Fred Vargas (b. 1957, France), historian & nv.
- Virginia Vargas (b. 1945, Peru), sociologist
- Galina Varlamova (1951–2019, Russia), Evenk philologist
- Mahadevi Varma (1907–1987, India), poet & educator
- Rahel Varnhagen (1771–1833, Germany), es. & correspondent
- Marja-Liisa Vartio (1924–1966, Finland), poet & fiction wr.
- M. Vasalis (1909–1998, Netherlands), poet & psychiatrist
- Vibeke Vasbo (b. 1944, Denmark), wr. & activist
- Ana Vásquez-Bronfman (1931–2009, Chile/France), nv. & sociologist
- Elizabeth Vassilieff (1917–2007, Australia), wr. & critic
- Marie Vassiltchikov (1917–1978, Russia/Germany), diarist
- Ruth Vassos (1890s–1965), editor & non-f. wr.
- Ganga Bharani Vasudevan (living, India), fiction wr.
- Kapila Vatsyayan (1928–2020, India), arts wr.
- Hilda Vaughan (1892–1985, Wales), fiction wr.
- Fan Vavřincová (1917–2012, Czechoslovakia/Czech Republic), screenwriter & nv.
- Joana Vaz (c. 1500 – post-1570, Portugal), humanist & poet
- Reetika Vazirani (1962–2003, India/United States), poet & educator
- Mâliâraq Vebæk (1917–2012, Gd), ethnographer & nv.
- Tatiana Vedenska (b. 1976, Soviet Union/Russia), nv.
- Cornelia van der Veer (1609–1674, Netherlands), poet
- Carmen Acevedo Vega (1913–2006, Ecuador), poet & wr.
- Janine Pommy Vega (1942–2010, United States), poet
- Luz Méndez de la Vega (1919–2012, Guatemala), wr., poet and actor
- Maria Vega (1898–1980, Russia) poet, artist & translator
- Saša Vegri (1934–2010, Yugoslavia/Slovenia), poet & ch. wr.
- Amélia Veiga (b. 1932, Portugal/Angola), poet
- Dolores Veintimilla (1829–1857, Ecuador), poet
- Marieta de Veintemilla (1855–2007, Ecuador), wr. & politician
- Helen Velando (b. 1961), ch. & YA wr.
- Jacoba van Velde (1903–1985, Netherlands), nv. & pw.
- Teresa Román Vélez (1925–2021, Comoros), wr. & chef
- Svetlana Velmar-Janković (1933–2014, Serbia), nv. & chronicler
- Socorro Venegas (b. 1972, Mexico), fiction wr.
- Aurora Venturini (1922–2015, Argentina), fiction wr., poet & es.
- Yvonne Vera (1964–2005, Zimbabwe), fiction wr.
- Grazia Verasani (b. 1964, Italy), nv., pw. & songwriter
- Anastasiya Verbitskaya (1861–1928, Russia/Soviet Union), nv. & pw.
- Raquel Verdesoto (1910–1999, Ecuador), wr., poet & activist
- Sonia Romo Verdesoto (living, Ecuador), poet
- Patricia Verdugo (1947–2008, Chile), wr. & activist
- Caroline Vermalle (b. 1973, France), nv.
- Seda Vermisheva (1932–2020, Soviet Union/Russia), poet, economist & activist
- María Sáez de Vernet (1800–1858), chronicler of Argentine Falkland settlers
- Barbara Vernon (1916–1978, Australia), pw. & scriptwriter
- Angela Veronese (1778–1847, Italy), poet
- Moira Verschoyle (1903–1985, Iran/Persia/England), nv. & pw.
- Octavia Walton Le Vert (1811–1877, United States), wr.
- Sonja Veselinović (b. 1981, Serbia), wr.
- Lidia Veselitskaya (1857–1936, Russia/Soviet Union), nv. & mem.
- Aglaja Veteranyi (1962–2002, Romania/Switzerland), nv. & circus performer
- Stephanie Vetter (1884–1974, Netherlands/Belgium), nv. in Dutch
- Noelle Vial (1959–2003, Ireland), poet
- Luz de Viana (1900–1995, Chile), wr. & painter
- Josefina Vicens (1911–1988, Mexico), nv. & screenwriter
- Ana Vicente (1943–2015, Portugal), social wr.
- Pilar de Vicente-Gella (1942–2016, Spain), wr.
- Marie Anne de Vichy-Chamrond, marquise du Deffand (1697–1780, France), correspondent
- Patrizia Vicinelli (1943–1991, Italy), poet & col.
- Chiqui Vicioso (b. 1948, Dominican Republic), poet, wr.
- Soledad Fariña Vicuña (b. 1943, Chile), poet
- Mary Therese Vidal (1815–1873, Australia), nv.
- Maja Vidmar (b. 1961, Yugoslavia/Slovenia), poet
- Clara Viebig (1862–1952, Germany), nv. & pw.
- Alice Vieira (b. 1943, Portugal), ch. wr.
- Marie Vieux-Chauvet (1916–1973, Haiti), nv., poet & pw.
- Delphine de Vigan (b. 1966, France), nv.
- Frida Vigdorova (1915–1965, Soviet Union/Russia), col. & nv.
- Vicki Viidikas (1948–1998, Australia), poet & prose wr.
- Elo Viiding (b. 1974, Estonia), poet
- Vijayalakshmi (b. 1960, India), poet
- Vaira Vīķe-Freiberga (b. 1937, Latvia), non-f. wr. & politician
- Božena Viková-Kunětická (1862–1934, Austria/Austria-Hungary/Czechoslovakia/Czech Republic), wr. & politician
- Monica Vikström-Jokela (b. 1960, Finland), scriptwriter & wr. in Swedish
- Marika Vila (b. 1949, Spain), graphic nv.
- Maruxa Vilalta (1932–2014, Spain/Mexico), pw.
- Esther Vilar (b. 1935, Argentina), non-f. wr. & pw. in German
- Idea Vilariño (1920–2009, Uruguay), poet, es. & critic
- Iryna Vilde (1907–1982, Australia/Ukraine), fiction wr.
- Linda Vilhjálmsdóttir (b. 1958, Iceland), wr., poet & pw.
- Lettie Viljoen (b. 1948, South Africa), wr. in Afrikaans
- Muriel Villanueva i Perarnau (b. 1976, Spain), nv. ch. wr. & poet
- Andrea Villarreal (1881–1963, Mexico),
- Clara Villarosa (b. 1930, United States), wr.
- Marie-Catherine de Villedieu (1640–1683, France), pw. & fiction wr.
- Gabrielle-Suzanne de Villeneuve (1685–1755, France), fiction wr.
- Phillippa Yaa de Villiers (b. 1966, South Africa), poet
- Hermine Villinger (1849–1917, Germany), nv. & short-story wr.
- Louise Leveque de Vilmorin (1902–1969, France), nv., poet & col.
- Elsa G. Vilmundardóttir (1932–2008, Iceland), geologist
- Carmen Villoro (b. 1958, Mexico), psychologist, poet & ch. wr.
- Nada Vilotijević (b. 1953, Serbia), wr. & professor
- Isabella Vincentini (b. 1954, Italy), poet, es. & critic
- Simona Vinci (b. 1970, Italy), nv. & ch. wr.
- Paulina Vinderman (b. 1944, Argentina), poet & translator
- Elfrida Vipont (1902–1992), ch. wr.
- Pinki Virani (b. 1959, India), wr. & activist
- Elene Virsaladze (1911–1977, Georgia (Caucasus)/Soviet Union), folklorist
- Anna Visscher (1583–1651, Netherlands), poet & artist
- Jenny Visser-Hooft (1888–1939, Netherlands), travel wr.
- Ida Vitale (b. 1923, Uruguay), art wr.
- Eugenia Viteri (1928–2023, Ecuador), nv. & anthologist
- Drífa Viðar (1920–1971, Iceland), wr. & artist
- Susan Visvanathan (b. 1957, India), social anthropologist & fiction wr.
- Annie Vivanti (1866–1942, England/Italy), poet & nv. in English & Italian
- Renée Vivien (1877–1909, England/France), poet
- María Argelia Vizcaíno (b. 1955, Cuba), col. & screenwriter
- Helen Vlachos (1911–1995, Gk), autobiographer & col.
- Simone van der Vlugt (b. 1966, Netherlands), adult & YA fiction wr.
- Angela Vode (1892–1985, Yugoslavia/Slovenia), feminist, concentration camp survivor & autobiographer
- Michelle Vogel (b. 1972, Australia), film historian, wr. & editor
- Clara Voghan (b. 1957, Argentina), romance wr.
- Ellen Bryant Voigt (1943–2025, United States), poet & es.
- Helene Voigt-Diederichs (1875–1961, Germany), fiction & travel wr.
- Marija Vojskovič (1915–1997, Yugoslavia/Slovenia), fiction wr.
- Zinaida Volkonskaya (1792–1862, Russia), poet, fiction wr. & pw.
- Hava Volovich (1916–2000, Soviet Union/Russia), mem., actor & Gulag survivor
- Élisabeth Vonarburg (b. 1947, France), science fiction wr.
- Yekaterina Vorontsova-Dashkova (1743–1810, Russia), mem.
- Ornela Vorpsi (b. 1968, Albania/France), wr. & photographer
- Ida Vos (1921–2006, Netherlands), mem. & Hc. survivor
- Erika Vouk (b. 1941, Yugoslavia/Slovenia), poet
- Vira Vovk (1926–2022, Ukraine/Brazil), poet, nv. & pw.
- Marko Vovchok (1833–1907, Russia), nv. & translator
- Julia Voznesenskaya (1940–2015, Soviet Union/Russia), wr.
- Ethel Voynich (1864–1960, Iran/Persia/England), nv. & musician
- Susanna de Vries (b. 1936, Australia), biographer
- Jurgen Vsych (b. 1966, United States), director & screenwriter
- Beb Vuyk (1905–1991, Dutch East Indies/Netherlands), non-f. wr.
- Divna M. Vuksanović (b. 1965, Serbia), non-f. wr. & philosopher
- Kerttu Vuolab (b. 1951), wr. in Sámi & illustrator
- Anna Vyrubova (1884–1964, Russia/Finland), princess & mem.
- Marita van der Vyver (b. 1958, South Africa/France), es. & fiction wr. in Afrikaans

== W ==
=== Wa–Wh ===
- Mira W (b. 1951, Indonesia), fiction wr.
- Kit de Waal (b. 1960, England/Ireland), nv.
- Elly de Waard (b. 1940, Netherlands), poet & critic
- Charity Waciuma (b. 1936, Kenya), nv. & YA wr.
- Natto Wada (和田夏十, 1920–1983, Japan), scriptwriter & col.
- Helen Waddell (1889–1965, Ireland/England), poet & academic
- Elizabeth Wagele (1939–2017, United States), wr. & cartoonist
- Nora Wagener (b. 1989, Luxembourg), fiction & ch. wr. & pw. in German
- Elin Wägner (1882–1949, Sweden), fiction & non-f. wr. & biographer
- Madge Morris Wagner (1862–1924, United States), poet, nv., jrnl.
- Alena Wagnerová (b. 1936, Czechoslovakia/Czech Republic), wr. in Czech & German
- Magdalena Wagnerová (b. 1960, Czechoslovakia/Czech Republic), ch. & screenplay wr.
- Raza Naqvi Wahi (1914–2002, India), poet
- Bronisława Wajs (1908–1987, Poland), poet & singer
- Joanna Wajs (b. 1979, Poland), poet & prose wr.
- Paula Wajsman (1939–1995, Argentina), poet & psychologist
- Chisako Wakatake (若竹千佐子, b. 1954, Japan), fiction wr.
- Vikki Wakefield (b. 1970, Australia), YA wr.
- Diane Wakoski (b. 1937, United States), poet
- Kate Walbert (b. 1961, United States), fiction wr.
- Elizabeth Walcott-Hackshaw (b. 1964, Trinidad), wr. & academic
- Anne Waldman (b. 1945, United States), poet
- Adelaide Cilley Waldron (1843–1909, United States), wr., editor
- Rosmarie Waldrop (b. 1935, United States), poet & translator
- Brígida Walker (1863–1942, Chile), education wr.
- Alice Walker (b. 1944, United States), fiction wr. & poet
- Kath Walker (1920–1993, Australia), poet, fiction wr. & artist
- Lucy Walker (1907–1987, Australia), nv.
- Margaret Walker (1915–1998, United States), poet & nv.
- Mildred Walker (1905–1998, United States), nv.
- Rebecca Walker (b. 1968, United States), wr., feminist & activist
- Rosa Kershaw Walker (1840s–1909, United States), non-f. wr., editor, journalist
- Annie Russell Wall (1835–1920, United States), non-f. wr.
- Dorothy Wall (1894–1942, Australia), ch. wr. & illustrator
- Maureen Wall (1918–1972, Ireland), historian
- Doreen Wallace (1897–1989, England), nv.
- Louise Wallace (b. 1983, New Zealand), poet
- Michele Wallace (b. 1952, United States), feminist wr. & critic
- Phoebe Waller-Bridge (b. 1985, England), screenwriter
- Effie Waller Smith (1879–1960, United States), poet
- Jeannette Walls (b. 1960, United States), wr. & col.
- Anne Walmsley (1931–2025, England), scholar, critic & wr.
- Carla Walschap (b. 1932, Belgium), wr. in Flemish
- Catherine Walsh (b. 1964, Ireland), poet
- Jill Paton Walsh (1937–2020, England), nv. & ch. wr.
- María Elena Walsh (1930–2011, Argentina), poet, nv. & pw.
- Dolores Walshe (b. 1949, Ireland), fiction wr. & pw.
- Elizabeth Hely Walshe (1835–1869, Ireland), ch. wr. & historian
- Minnie Gow Walsworth (1859–1947, United States), poet
- Silja Walter (1919–2011, Switzerland), poet & religious wr. in German
- Lettice D'Oyly Walters (1880–1940), poet and editor
- Vanessa Walters (b. 1978, England), nv. & pw.
- Amy Catherine Walton (1849–1939, England), ch. wr.
- Jo Walton (b. 1964, Wales), fantasy & science fiction wr.
- Susana, Lady Walton (1926–1983, Argentina), non-f. wr. in English
- Ania Walwicz (1951–2020, Australia), poet
- Zuhur Wanasi (b. 1936, Algeria), fiction wr. & politician
- Shangguan Wan'er (上官婉兒, c. 664–710, China), poet & prose wr.
- Lulu Wang (王露露, b. 1960, China/Netherlands), nv. in Dutch
- Ayeta Anne Wangusa (b. 1971, Uganda), wr. & activist
- Zukiswa Wanner (b. 1976, South Africa/Kenya), col. & nv.
- Lise Warburg (b. 1932, Denmark), tapestry wr. & weaver
- Harriet Ward (1808–1873, England), non-f. & fiction wr. in English
- Jesmyn Ward (b. 1977, United States), nv. & academic
- Mary Augusta Ward (Mrs Humphry Ward, 1851–1920, England), nv.
- Sarah Ward (living, England), nv. & critic
- Julia Rush Cutler Ward (1796–1824, United States), poet
- Marie Warder (1927–2014, South Africa/Canada/Newfoundland), nv. & medical wr.
- Mary Ware (writer) (1828–1915, United States), poet, wr.
- Anna Laetitia Waring (1823–1910, Wales), poet & hymnist
- Marilyn Waring (b. 1952, New Zealand), economist & politician
- Gertrude Chandler Warner (1890–1978, United States), ch. wr.
- Marion E. Warner (1839–1918, United States), poet, ss. wr.
- Sally Warner (living, United States), children & young adult fiction wr.
- Susan Warner (1819–1885, United States), ch. wr. & songwriter
- Sylvia Townsend Warner (1893–1978, England), poet & nv.
- Maureen Warner-Lewis (b. 1943, Trinidad/Nigeria), wr. on linguistics
- Myriam Warner-Vieyra (1939–2017, Guadeloupe/Senegal), poet & nv.
- Blanche Warre-Cornish (1848–1922, England), nv., biographer & conversationalist
- Crystal Warren (living, South Africa), poet in English
- Dianne Warren (b. 1950, Canada/Newfoundland), fiction wr. & pw.
- Patricia Nell Warren (pen name Patricia Kilina, 1936–2019, United States), nv., poet & journalist
- Chloé Wary (b. 1995, France), comics. wr.
- Marion Foster Washburne (1863-1944, United States), nv., non-f. wr., jrnl. ed.
- Wendy Wasserstein (1950–2006, United States), pw.
- Masako Watanabe (わたなべまさこ, b. 1929, Japan), manga creator
- Taeko Watanabe (渡辺多恵子, b. 1960, Japan), manga creator
- Yuu Watase (渡瀬悠宇, b. 1970, Japan), manga creator
- Risa Wataya (綿矢りさ, b. 1984, Japan), nv.
- Sarah Waters (b. 1966, Wales), nv.
- Elizabeth Watkin-Jones (1887–1966, Wales), ch. wr.
- Jean Watson (1933–2014, New Zealand), nv. & humanitarian
- Joy Watson (1938–2021, New Zealand), ch. wr.
- Mary Watson (b. 1975, South Africa/Ireland), fiction wr.
- Fiona Watt (living, England), ch. wr.
- Monique Watteau (b. 1929, Belgium), fiction wr. in French
- Margaret Way (1935–2022, Australia), nv.
- Kyra Petrovskaya Wayne (1918–2018, Soviet Union/United States), fiction & YA wr.
- Maria Webb (1804–1873, Ireland), religious wr. & Quaker historian
- Catherine Webb (b. 1986, England), nv.
- Mary Webb (1881–1927, England), nv.; Precious Bane
- Delia Weber (1900–1982, Dominica), wr. & rights advocate
- Elizabeth Weber (b. 1923, no information after 1960s, South Africa), nv. & ch. wr. in Afrikaans
- Marianne Weber (1870–1954, Germany), sociologist & activist
- Augusta Webster (1837–1894, England), poet, pw. & es.
- Mary Morison Webster (1894–1980, Scotland/South Africa), novelist & poet
- Yvonne Weekes (b. 1958, England/Montserrat), pw. & poet
- Heleen Sancisi-Weerdenburg (1944–2000, Netherlands), Anc. historian
- Wei Hui (周衛慧, b. 1973), nv.
- Anna Weidenholzer (b. 1984, Austria/Austria-Hungary), wr. & col.
- Simone Weil (1909–1943, France), mystic & philosopher
- Hannah Weiner (1928–1997, United States), poet
- Helen Weinzweig (1915–2010, Canada), nv. & short story writer
- Liz Weir (b. 1950, Northern Ireland), ch. wr.
- Anna Elisabet Weirauch (1887–1970, Germany), nv. & lesbian wr.
- Ruth Weiss (1928–2020, Germany/United States), poet, pw. & performer
- Sara Weiss (d. 1904, United States), spiritualist wr.
- Jane Meade Welch (1854–1931, United States), col. & lecturer
- Fay Weldon (1931–2023, England), wr., es. & pw.
- Dorothy Wellesley (1889–1956, England), poet
- Charlotte Fowler Wells (1814–1901, United States), phrenologist
- Ida B. Wells (1862–1931, United States), wr. & sociologist
- Martha Wells (b. 1964, United States), nv.
- Louise Welsh (b. 1965, England/Scotland), fiction wr.
- Eudora Welty (1909–2001, United States), fiction wr. & photographer
- Viola S. Wendt (1907–1986, United States), poet & educator
- Miriam Were (b. 1940, Kenya), public health wr. & academic
- Timberlake Wertenbaker (b. 1946, United States/England), pw. & screenwriter
- Sara Wesslin (b. 1991, Finland), wr. in Sámi
- Dorothy West (1907–1998, United States), fiction wr.
- Jane West (1758–1852, England), nv., poet & pw.
- Jessamyn West (1902–1984, United States), fiction wr.
- Joyce West (1908–1985, New Zealand), nv. & ch. wr.
- Rebecca West (1892–1983, England), nv. & travel wr.
- Anna Westberg (1946–2005, Sweden), nv. & non-f. wr.
- Helena Westermarck (1857–1938, Finland), nv., biographer & painter
- Elizabeth Jane Weston (1581/1582–1612, England/Bohemia), poet (in Latin)
- Amy Westervelt (b. 1978, United States), col. & wr.
- Elizabeth Wetmore (b. 1967/68, United States), fiction wr.
- Josefina Wettergrund (1830–1903, Sweden), poet, nv. & non-f. wr.
- Lydia Wevers (1950–2021, New Zealand), wr. on literature
- Anne Wharton (1659–1685, England), poet
- Edith Wharton (1862–1937, United States), fiction wr.
- Leslie What (b. 1955, United States), fiction wr.
- Anne Wheathill (fl. 1584, England), poet & prayer wr.
- Nadia Wheatley (b. 1949, Australia), ch. nv. & wr.
- Phillis Wheatley (1753–1784, United States), poet
- Cora Stuart Wheeler (1852–1897, United States), poet, wr.
- Edith Wherry (1876-1961, United States), nv.
- Dorothy Whipple (1893–1966, England), nv.
- Evelyn Whitaker (1857–1903, England), nv.
- Agnes Romilly White (1872–1945, Iran/Persia/Northern Ireland), nv.
- Annabelle White (living, New Zealand), cookery wr.
- Antonia White (1899–1980, England), fiction wr.
- Dorothy White (c. 1630–1686, England), religious wr.
- Ellen G. White (1827–1915 United States), evangelist
- Emily White, (1839–1936, England/New Zealand), gardening wr.
- Ida L. White (fl. late 19th century, Iran/Persia/Northern Ireland), poet & feminist
- Laura Rosamond White (1844–1922, United States), wr., poet, editor
- Nettie L. White (c. 1850–1921, United States), stenographer, suffragist
- Stella Whitelaw (b. 1941) (UK), novelist, journalist
- Caroline Snowden Whitmarsh (1827-1898, United States), children's and science writer, compiler of hymns
- Joan Whitrowe (c. 1631–1707, England), religious wr., polemicist
- Lilian Whiting (1847–1942, United States), col. & wr.
- Margaret Whitlam (1919–2012, Australia), social wr. & autobiographer
- Myne Whitman (b. 1977, Nigeria), nv.
- Isabella Whitney (b. c. 1540–post-1624, England), poet
- Phyllis A. Whitney (1903–2008, United States), nv.
- Sarah J. C. Whittlesey (1824–1896), American nv, poet, hymn wr.

=== Wi–Wy ===
- Anne Wiazemsky (1947–2017, Germany/France), nv. and actor
- Nancy Wicker (living, United States), art historian
- Anna Wickham (1884–1947, England), poet
- Zoë Wicomb (1948–2025, South Africa/Scotland), fiction wr. & es.
- Margaret Widdemer (1884–1978, United States), poet & nv.
- Ulrika Widström (1764–1841, Sweden), poet & translator
- Elisabeth of Wied (Carmen Sylva, 1843–1916, Romania), poet, pw. & Queen Consort
- Bertha Wiernik (1884–1951), Jewish American writer
- Blanca Wiethüchter (1947–2004, Bolivia), wr. & historian
- Elsa Wiezell (1926–2014, Paraguay), poet & painter
- Kate Douglas Wiggin (1856–1923, United States), educator & ch. wr.
- Marianne Wiggins (b. 1947, United States), nv.
- Susan Wiggs (b. 1958, United States), nv.
- Emma Howard Wight (1863–1935, United States), wr., novelist, playwright.
- Rosemary Wighton (1925–1994, Australia), wr. & editor
- Dora Wilcox (1873–1953, Australia), poet & pw.
- Ella Wheeler Wilcox (1850–1918, United States), poet
- Margaret Wild (b. 1948, South Africa/Australia), ch. wr.
- Sarah Wild (living, South Africa), science wr. in English
- Jane Wilde (1821–1896, Ireland), poet
- Charlotte Wilder (1898–1980, United States), poet
- Cherry Wilder (1930–2002, New Zealand), science fiction wr.
- Laura Ingalls Wilder (1867–1957, United States), ch. wr.; Little House on the Prairie
- Lynn Wilder (b. 1952, United States), wr.
- Ottilie Wildermuth (1817–1877, Germany), fiction & ch. wr.
- Faith Wilding (b. 1943, Paraguay/United States), wr. in English & artist
- Kate Wilhelm (1928–2018, United States), fiction wr.
- Kim Wilkins (b. 1966, Australia), fiction wr.
- Verna Wilkins (b. 1940s, Grenada/England), ch. wr.
- Christine Wilks (b. 1960), British digital writer and artist
- Marian Wilkinson (b. 1954, Australia), wr. & col.
- Alice Willard (1860–1936, United States), nonf. wr.
- Louise Collier Willcox (1865–1929, United States), wr., editor
- Sandrine Willems (b. 1968, Belgium/France), wr. in French
- Anna Williams (1706–1783, Wales/England), poet & companion to Samuel Johnson
- Cathy Williams (b. 1957, Trinidad/England), romance wr.
- Donna Williams (1963–2017, Australia), wr., musician & sculptor
- Eley Williams (living, England), wr.
- Faldela Williams (1952–2014, South Africa), cookery wr. in English
- Helen Maria Williams (1762–1827, England), nv. & poet
- Jane Williams (Ysgafell, 1806–1885, Wales), poet & es.
- Joy Williams (b. 1944, United States), fiction wr. & es.
- Liz Williams (b. 1965, England), science fiction wr.
- Margaret Hicks Williams (1899–1972, United States), feature wr.
- Margery Williams (1881–1944, England/United States), ch. wr.
- Maria Jane Williams (c. 1795–1873, Wales), folklorist & musician
- Ruth C. Williams (1897–1962, Australia), ch. wr.
- Sherley Anne Williams (1944–1998, United States), poet & nv.
- Mabel Williamson (fl. mid-20th century, United States), missionary
- Connie Willis (b. 1945, United States), science fiction wr.
- Elizabeth Willis (b. 1961, United States), poet, critic & professor
- Dorrit Willumsen (b. 1940, Denmark), fiction wr.
- Katherine Wilmot (c. 1773–1824, Iran/Persia/England), diarist & travel wr.
- Amrit Wilson (b. 1941, India/England), wr., journalist & activist
- Anne Elizabeth Wilson (1901–1946, United States/Canada) non-f. wr., poet & ed.
- Cynthia Wilson (b. 1934, Barbados), fiction wr. & educator
- Ella B. Ensor Wilson (1838–1913, United States), social reformer & non-f. writer
- Florence Mary Wilson (c. 1870–1946, Iran/Persia/Northern Ireland), poet
- Harriett C. Wilson (1916–2002, England), sociologist
- Harriet E. Wilson (1825–1900, United States), nv.
- Hazel Hutchins Wilson (1898–1992, United States), ch. wr.
- Helen Wilson (1869–1957, New Zealand), autobiographer & community leader
- Ibbie McColm Wilson (1834–1908, United States), poet
- Jacqueline Wilson (b. 1945, England), ch. wr.
- Margaret Wilson (living, Australia), TV wr.
- Margaret Wilson (1882–1973, United States), nv.
- Krysty Wilson-Cairns (b. 1987, Scotland), screenwriter
- Évelyne Wilwerth (b. 1947, Belgium), poet & fiction wr. in French
- Tara June Winch (b. 1983, Australia), fiction wr.
- Sheila Wingfield (1906–1992, England/Ireland), poet
- Laurie Winkless (living, Iran/Persia/England), science wr.
- Dallas Winmar (living, Australia), pw.
- Sarah Winnemucca (1841–1891, United States), lecturer & autobiographer
- Eliza Winstanley (Ariele, 1818–1882, Australia), wr. & actor
- Annie Steger Winston (1862–1927, United States), nv., ss. wr., non-f. wr.
- Kathleen Winter (b. 1960, Canada/Newfoundland), fiction wr., col. & screenwriter
- Jeanette Winterson (b. 1959, England), nv.
- Jeneverah M. Winton (1837–1904, United States), poet, wr.
- Joëlle Wintrebert (b. 1949, France), science fiction and ch. wr.
- Maria Wirtemberska (1768–1864, Poland/France), wr. & philanthropist
- Jane Wiseman (c. 1682–1717, England), poet & pw.
- Eleanor Witcombe (1923–2018, Australia), screenwriter
- Carolinda Witt (b. 1955, Kenya), wr. on yoga
- Monique Wittig (1935–2003, France), wr. & feminist
- Amy Witting (Joan Austral Fraser, 1918–2001, Australia), nv. & poet
- Maria Petronella Woesthoven (1760–1830, Netherlands), poet
- Gabriele Wohmann (1932–2015, Germany), fiction wr.
- Maia Wojciechowska (1927–2002, Poland/United States), ch. & YA wr.
- Sabina Wolanski (1927–2011, Australia), autobiographer & Hc. survivor
- Gunilla Wolde (1939–2015, Sweden), ch. wr. & caricaturist
- Cendrine Wolf (b. 1969, France), ch. wr.
- Christa Wolf (1929–2011, Germany), nv., critic & es.
- Ema Wolf (b. 1948, Argentina), wr. & col.
- Emma Wolf (1865–1932, United States), nv.
- Martha Wolfenstein (1869–1906, United States), nv.
- Betje Wolff (1738–1804, Netherlands), nv.
- Maryse Wolinski (1943–2021, Algeria/France), nv. & screenwriter
- Mary Wollstonecraft (1759–1797, England), nv. & feminist
- Claire Wolniewicz (b. 1966, France), wr. & col.
- Caroline von Wolzogen (1763–1847, Germany), nv. & biographer
- Frances Garnet Wolseley, 2nd Viscountess Wolseley (1872–1936, England), garden wr.
- Buffalo Bird Woman (1839–1932, United States), wr.
- Alison Wong (b. 1960, New Zealand), poet & nv.
- Elizabeth Wong (黃錢其濂, b. 1937, China/New Zealand), fiction wr.
- Jade Snow Wong (1922–2006, United States), autobiographer & ceramicist
- Nellie Wong (b. 1934, Chile/United States), feminist poet
- C. Antoinette Wood (1867–1942, United States), wr. & pw.
- Ellen (Mrs Henry) Wood (1814–1887, England), nv.
- Gaby Wood (b. 1971, England), col. & critic
- Gwyneth Barber Wood (died 2006, Jamaica), poet
- Julia A. Wood (1840–1927, United States), non-f. wr., composer
- Molara Wood (b. 1967, Nigeria), wr. & critic
- Susan Wood (1836–1880, Australia/New Zealand), poet & es.
- Susan Wood (b. 1946, United States), poet
- Wendy Wood (1892–1981, England/Scotland), political wr. & artist
- Elizabeth Wood-Ellem (1930–2012, Tonga/Australia), historian
- Denyse Woods (b. 1958, Ireland), fiction wr.
- Jacqueline Woodson (b. 1963, United States), ch. & YA wr.
- Caroline M. Clark Woodward (1840–1924, United States), non-f. wr.
- Virginia Woolf (1882–1941, England), fiction wr. & es.; Mrs. Dalloway
- Angela Woollacott (b. 1955, Australia), historian
- Abba Goold Woolson (1838–1921, United States), wr.
- Constance Fenimore Woolson (1840–1894, United States), fiction wr.
- Linda Woolverton (b. 1952, United States), nv., screenwriter, & pw.
- Chun Woon-young (천운영, b. 1971, Korea), wr.
- Sue Wootton (b. 1961, New Zealand), poet & fiction wr.
- Anne Eyre Worboys (1920–2007, New Zealand/England), nv.
- Dorothy Wordsworth (1771–1855, England), poet & diarist
- Pauline Worm (1825–1883, Denmark), wr., poet & feminist
- Elizabeth Strong Worthington (1851–1916, United States), wr.
- Isabella Letitia Woulfe (1817–1870, Ireland), nv.
- Liliane Wouters (1930–2016, Belgium), poet, pw. & es. in French
- Maria Carratalà i Van den Wouver (1899–1984, Spain), pw. in Catalan & musician
- Maev-Ann Wren (living, Ireland), economist & health wr.
- Alexis Wright (b. 1950, Australia), fiction & non-f. wr.
- C. D. Wright (1949–2016, United States), poet
- Judith Wright (1915–2000, Australia), poet & environmentalist
- June Wright (1919–2012, Australia), crime & non-f. wr.
- Mary Tappan Wright (1851–1916, United States), fiction wr.
- Patricia Wrightson (1921–2010, Australia), ch. wr.
- Lady Mary Wroth (1587–1652, England), poet
- Wu Chuntao (b. 1963), wr. & journalist
- Wu Zao (吳藻, 1799–1862, China), poet
- Hella Wuolijoki (1886–1964, Estonia/Finland), prose wr. & politician
- Audrey Wurdemann (1911–1960, United States), poet
- Mathilde Wurm (1874–1935, Germany/England), politician & activist
- Marguerite Wyke (1908–1995, United States/Trinidad), teacher, poet, artist & politician
- Elinor Wylie (1885–1928, United States), poet & nv.
- Ida Alexa Ross Wylie (1885–1959, Australia), nv.
- Frances Wynne (1863–1893, Ireland), poet
- Grace Wynne-Jones (living, Ireland), wr. & radio pw.
- Sylvia Wynter (b. 1928, Jamaica), nv., pw. & critic

== X ==
- Makhosazana Xaba (b. 1957, South Africa), poet & fiction wr. in English
- Ester Xargay Melero (1960-2024, Spain), poet, translator
- Xi Xi (西西, 1937–2022, China), nv. & poet
- Xia Jia (王瑶, b. 1984, China), science fiction & fantasy wr.
- Xiao Hong (蕭紅, 1911–1942, China), wr.
- Xie Daoyun (謝道韞, pre-340 – post-399, China), poet & scholar
- Xinran (薛欣然, b. 1958, Chile/England), wr. & col.
- Bing Xin (謝婉瑩, 1900–1999, China), wr.
- Empress Xu (徐皇后, 1362–1407, China), bibliographer & empress consort
- Xu Hui (徐惠, 627–650, China), poet
- Xu Kun (徐坤, b. 1965), fiction wr.
- Lady Xu Mu (許穆夫人, fl. 7th century BC, China), poet
- Xu Zihua (徐自华, 1873–1935, China), poet
- Halima Xudoyberdiyeva (1947–2018, Uz), poet
- Xue Susu (薛素素, c. 1564 – c. 1650, China), poet
- Xue Tao (薛濤, 768–831, China), poet
- Rao Xueman (饒雪漫, b. 1972, China), fiction wr. & es.

== Y ==
- Rama Yade (b. 1976, Senegal), non-f. wr. & politician
- Elham Yaghoubian (living, Iran/Persia), nv.
- Tetiana Yakovenko (b. 1954, Ukraine), poet
- Margarita Yakovleva (b. 1981, Ukraine), poet
- Balaraba Ramat Yakubu (b. 1959, Nigeria), nv.
- Nanpei Yamada (山田南平, b. 1972, Japan), manga creator
- Ryoko Yamagishi (山岸凉子, b. 1947, Japan), manga creator
- Yamakawa Kikue (山川菊栄, 1890–1980, Japan), es. & activist
- Hisaye Yamamoto (1921–2011, United States), fiction wr.
- Mika Yamamoto (山本美香, 1967–2012, Japan), col.
- Karen Tei Yamashita (b. 1951, United States), nv., pw. & academic
- Kazumi Yamashita (山下和美, b. 1959, manga creator
- Yamato Hime no Ōkimi (倭姫王, fl. later 7th century, Japan), poet
- Yūki Yamato (山戸結希, b. 1989, Japan), screenwriter
- Wakako Yamauchi (1924–2018, United States), wr.
- Mari Yamazaki (ヤマザキマリ, b. 1967, Japan), manga creator
- Hanya Yanagihara (b. 1974, United States), nv. & travel wr.
- María Flora Yáñez (1898–1982, Chile), fiction wr.
- Yang Gui-ja (양귀자, b. 1955, Korea), nv.
- Yang Shuang-zi (楊双子, b. 1984, Taiwan), nv & es.
- Tiphanie Yanique (b. 1978, United States), fiction wr., poet & es.
- Lyubov Yanovska (1861–1933, Russia/Ukraine), fiction wr. & pw.
- Chelsea Quinn Yarbro (1942–2025, United States), fiction & non-f. wr.
- Yevheniya Yaroshynska (1868–1904, Austria/Austria-Hungary), fiction wr. in Ukrainian
- Laura Yasán (1960–2021, Argentina), poet
- Chista Yasrebi (b. 1968, Iran/Persia), wr., critic
- Rie Yasumi (やすみりえ, b. 1972, Japan), poet
- Paula Yates (1959–2000, England), non-f. wr.
- Ai Yazawa (矢沢あい, b. 1967, Japan), manga creator
- Yana Yazova (1912–1974, Bulgaria), poet & nv.
- Rosa Borja de Ycaza (1889–1964, Ecuador), wr., poet & pw.
- Year 24 Group (24年組, early 1970s), manga creators
- Ann Yearsley (1753–1806, England), poet, nv. & pw.
- Sonja Yelich (b. 1965, Croatia/New Zealand), poet
- Barbara Yelin (b. 1977, Germany), cartoonist, nv.
- Yeo Ok (여옥, 1st millennium BC, Korea), poet
- Tatyana Yesenina (1918–1992, Russia), nv. & mem.
- Pamela Ayo Yetunde (born 1961, US), non fiction wr.
- Anna Yevreinova (1844–1919, Russia), feminist & correspondent
- Anzia Yezierska (1883–1970, Poland/United States), fiction wr.
- Yi Bingheogak (빙허각이씨, fl. c. 1809, Korea), encyclopedist
- Yi Geun-hwa (이근화, b. 1976, Korea), poet & educator
- Yi Kyoung-ja (이경자, b. 1948, Korea), fiction wr.
- Gullu Yologlu (b. 1963, Azerbaijan), non-f. wr. & ethnologist
- Mari Yonehara (米原万里, 1950–2006, Japan), fiction & non-f. wr. & es.
- Charlotte Mary Yonge (1823–1901, England), nv.
- Yoo An-jin (유안진, b. 1941, Korea), poet, es. & educator
- Paula Yoo (USA), children's wr. & screenwriter
- Yosano Akiko (与謝野晶子, 1878–1942, Japan), poet
- Akimi Yoshida (吉田秋生, b. 1956, Japan), manga creator
- Tomoko Yoshida (吉田知子, b. 1934, Manchuria/Japan), wr.
- Banana Yoshimoto (吉本ばなな, b. 1964, Japan), nv.
- Nobuko Yoshiya (吉屋信子, 1896–1973, Japan), nv.
- Wataru Yoshizumi (吉住渉, b. 1963, Japan), manga creator
- Ekaterina Petrova Yosifova (1941–2022, Bulgaria), es. & poet
- Ella Young (1867–1956, Ireland), poet & mythologist
- Kerry Young (b. 1955, Jamaica/England), nv.
- Marguerite Young (1908–1995, United States), nv., poet & academic
- Yoo An-jin (유안진, b. 1941, Korea), poet, es. & professor
- Rose Maud Young (1866–1947, Ireland), scholar
- Kang Young-sook (강영숙, b. 1966, Korea), wr.
- Marguerite Yourcenar (1903–1987, Belgium/United States), nv. & es. in French
- Malala Yousafzai (b. 1997, Pakistan/England), mem. & politician
- Yovanna (b. 1940, Greece), poet, nv. & songwriter
- Yu Xuanji (魚玄機, 844–869 or 871, China), poet
- Yun I-hyeong (윤이형, b. 1976, Korea), fiction wr.
- Yuasa Yoshiko (湯浅芳子, 1896–1990, Japan), linguist & translator
- Kaori Yuki (由貴香織里, living, Japan), manga creator
- Shigeko Yuki (由起しげ子, 1900–1969, Japan), ch. wr.
- Sumomo Yumeka (夢花李, living, Japan), manga creator
- Yun-I Hyeong (윤이형, b. 1976, Korea), wr.
- Mallika Yunis (living, India), nv.
- Sim Yunkyung (심윤경, b. 1972, Korea), nv.
- Asako Yuzuki (柚木麻子, b. 1981, Japan), fiction wr.

== Z ==
- Pilar Zabala Aguirre (b. 1951, Spain), non-f. wr.
- Oksana Zabuzhko (b. 1960, Ukraine), poet, nv. & non-f. wr.
- Rachel Zadok (b. 1972, South Africa), nv. in English
- Zafer Hanım (fl. 1877, Turkey/Ottoman Empire), nv.
- Jessica Zafra (b. 1965, Philippines), es. & col.
- Marija Jurić Zagorka (1873–1957, Austria/Austria-Hungary), wr. in Croat
- Helen Zahavi (b. 1966, England), wr.
- Rosemarie Said Zahlan (1937–2006, Palestine/United States), wr. on Arab affairs
- Anna Zahorska (1882–1942, Poland), poet, nv., pw. and Hc. victim
- Stefania Zahorska (1890–1961, Poland), nv. & non-f. wr.
- Shama Zaidi (b. 1938, India), art critic & screenwriter
- Zahida Zaidi (1930–2011, India), poet, pw. & educator
- Zaitoon Bano (1938–2021, India/Pakistan), fiction wr.
- Lyubov Zakharchenko (1961–2008 Soviet Union/Russia), poet & songwriter
- Maria Julia Zaleska (1831–1889, Poland), fiction wr. & es.
- Māra Zālīte (b. 1952, Latvia), poet
- Gloria Zamacois (1897—1946, Spain), ss. wr.
- Dina Zaman (1969, Malaysia), fiction & non-f. wr. & poet
- Esperanza Zambrano (1901–1992, Mexico), poet
- María Zambrano (1904–1991, Spain), es. & philosopher
- Daisy Zamora (b. 1950, Nicaragua), poet
- Fatma Zohra Zamoum (b. 1967, Algeria), wr., filmmaker & educator
- Adela Zamudio (1854–1928, Bolivia), poet, feminist & educator
- Giovanna Zangrandi (1910–1988, Italy), nv.
- Giselda Zani (1909–1975, Italy), poet, fiction wr. & critic
- Maya Zankoul (b. 1986, Saudi Arabia/Lebanon), nv. & cartoonist
- Léontine Zanta (1872–1942, France), nv. & philosopher
- Celia Correas de Zapata (1935–2022), poet & non-f. wr.
- Gabriela Zapolska (1857–1921, Poland), nv., pw. & naturalist
- Ayşe Nur Zarakolu (1946–2002, Turkey/Ottoman Empire), political wr.
- Carol Zardetto (living, Guatemala), nv. & critic
- Sumaira Zareen (1944–1977, Pakistan), fiction wr.
- Shaïda Zarumey (b. 1938, Nigeria), sociologist & poet
- Zyranna Zateli (b. 1951, Greece), fiction & non-f. wr.
- Marya Zaturenska (1902–1982 United States), poet
- Sidonia Hedwig Zäunemann (1711–1740, Germany), poet
- Iris Zavala (1936–2020, Paraguay), poet, nv. & non-f. wr.
- María de Zayas (1590–1661, Spain), feminist wr.
- Amina Zaydan (b. 1966, Egypt), fiction wr.
- Zaynab Fawwaz (c. 1860–1914, Lebanon/Egypt), nv., pw. & poet
- Katarzyna Ewa Zdanowicz-Cyganiak (b. 1979, Poland), poet & social scientist
- Jo Zebedee (b. 1971, Northern Ireland), science fiction wr.
- Zdenka Žebre (1920–2011, Yugoslavia/Slovenia), nv. & ch. wr.
- Fiona Zedde (b. 1976, Jamaica/United States), nv.
- Juli Zeh (b. 1974, Germany), nv.
- Alki Zei (1925–2020, Greece), nv. & ch. wr.
- Susanna Elizabeth Zeidler (1657 – c. 1706, Germany), poet
- Sylvia Aguilar Zéleny (b. 1973, Mexico), fiction wr.
- Hana Zelinová (1914–2004, Czechoslovakia/Czech Republic/Slovakia), fiction wr. & pw.
- Eva Zeller (1923–2022, Germany), poet & nv.
- Žemaitė (1845–1921, Lithuania), fiction wr., es. & pw.
- Luisa Zeni (1896–1940, Italy), political wr.
- Zeng Baosun (曾寶蓀, 1893–1978, China), historian & feminist
- Irena Žerjal (1940–2018, Italy/Slovenia), poet and fiction wr.
- Wu Zetian (武則天, 624–705, China), poet, es. & Empress Regnant
- Zuzka Zguriška (1900–1984, Austria/Austria-Hungary/Czechoslovakia/Czech Republic), nv. & pw. in Slovak
- Yulia Zhadovskaya (1824–1883, Russia), poet & nv.
- Zhai Yongming (翟永明, b. 1955, China), poet
- Zhang Haidi (张海迪, b. 1955, China), wr.
- Zhang Jie (張潔, 1937–2022, China), fiction wr.
- Zhang Kangkang (张抗抗, b. 1950, China), political wr.
- Lijia Zhang (张丽佳, b. 1964, China), wr. & nv.
- Zhang Ling (张翎, b. 1957, China), fiction wr.
- Zhao Luorui (趙蘿蕤, 1912–1998, China), poet & translator
- Zhang Xinxin (張辛欣, b. 1953, China), wr.
- Zhang Yaotiao (張窈窕, 9th century, China), poet
- Zhang Yueran (张悦然, b. 1982, China), fiction wr.
- Empress Zhangsun (長孫皇后, 601–636, China), moralist
- Zhao Luanluan (趙鸞鸞, fl. later 14th century, China), poet
- Vera Zhelikhovsky (1835–1896, Russia), wr.
- Zheng Min (郑敏, 1920–2022, China), scholar & poet
- Zheng Xiaoqiong (郑小琼, living, b. 1980, China), poet
- Zheng Yunduan (c. 1327–1336, China), poet
- Polina Zherebtsova (b. 1985, Russia), poet & diarist
- Yilin Zhong (鍾宜霖, living, China/England), nv., poet & screenplay wr.
- Maria Zhukova (1804–1855, Russia), wr.
- Zhu Shuzhen (朱淑真, c. 1135–1180, China), poet
- Zhuo Wenjun (卓文君, fl. 2nd century BC, China), poet
- Valentina Zhuravleva (1933–2004 Russia), science fiction nv.
- Iryna Zhylenko (1941–2013, Soviet Union/Ukraine), poet & es.
- May Ziadeh (1886–1941, Lebanon/Palestine), poet & es.
- Annejet van der Zijl (b. 1962, Netherlands), nv. & biographer
- Lydia Zimmermann (b. 1966, Spain), screenwriter & filmmaker
- Alice Zimmern (1855–1939, England), wr. & translator
- Helen Zimmern (1846–1934, Germany/England), critic
- Hedda Zinner (also Elisabeth Frank, 1905–1994, Germany), political wr.
- Markéta Zinnerová (b. 1942, Czechoslovakia/Czech Republic), nv., ch. & screenwriter
- Lydia Zinovieva-Annibal (1866–1907, Russia), wr.
- Elvania Namukwaya Zirimu (1938–1979, Uganda), poet & pw.
- Zitkala-Sa (1876–1938, United States), wr. & editor
- Kathinka Zitz-Halein (1801–1877, Germany), poet and fiction wr.
- Nina Živančević (b. 1957, Serbia), pw., poet & nv.
- Bina Štampe Žmavc (b. 1951, Yugoslavia/Slovenia), poet, pw. & ch. wr.
- Narcyza Żmichowska (1818–1876, Poland), nv. & poet
- Inga Žolude (b. 1984, Latvia), fiction wr., pw. & translator
- Anna Zonová (b. 1962, Czechoslovakia/Czech Republic), fiction wr.
- Halide Nusret Zorlutuna (1901–1984, Turkey/Ottoman Empire), poet, fiction wr. & autobiographer
- Birgit Zotz (b. 1979, Austria/Austria-Hungary), non-f. wr. & es.
- Vera Zouroff (1880–1967, China), poet, nv. & wr.
- Katarina Zrinska (c. 1625–1673, Austria/Austria-Hungary), poet in Croat
- Pilar de Zubiaurre (1884–1970, Spain), es. & letter wr.
- Svetlana Žuchová (b. 1976, Yu/Slovenia), fiction wr.
- Berta Zuckerkandl (1864–1945, Austria/Austria-Hungary), critic & non-f. wr.
- Zuo Fen (左芬, c. AD 255–300, China), poet
- Katka Zupančič (1889–1967, Austria/Austria-Hungary/United States), ch. poet, fiction wr. & pw.
- Unica Zürn (1916–1970, Germany), poet & painter
- Cvijeta Zuzorić (1552–1648, Dalmatia/Ragusa), poet in Italian & Croat
- Rose Zwi (1928–2018, South Africa/Australia), fiction wr.
- Maria van Zuylekom (1759–1831, Netherlands), poet & nv.
- Codien Zwaardemaker-Visscher (1835–1912, Netherlands), wr & translator
- Fay Zwicky (1933–2017, Australia), poet & academic
- Rajzel Żychlińsky (1910–2001, Poland/United States), poet in Yiddish

== See also ==
- Feminist literary criticism
- Feminist science fiction
- Feminist theory
- Gender in science fiction
- List of biographical dictionaries of female writers
- List of early-modern British women novelists
- List of early-modern British women playwrights
- List of early-modern British women poets
- List of female detective/mystery writers
- List of female poets
- List of women cookbook writers
- List of feminist literature
- List of female rhetoricians
- List of women hymn writers
- Norton Anthology of Literature by Women
- Women in science fiction
- Women Writers Project
- Women's writing in English
- Sophie (digital lib)
- Nimat Hamoush
