= Dzido =

Dzido is a Polish surname. Notable people with the surname include:

- Jadwiga Dzido (1918–1985), Polish resistance worker and pharmacy student
- Marta Dzido (born 1981), Polish writer and documentary filmmaker
