= Giovanni Dozzini =

Italian writer and journalist

Giovanni Dozzini (born 1978) is an Italian writer and journalist. He was born and raised in Perugia. He won the EU Prize for Literature in 2019 for his book E Baboucar guidava la fila.

== Biography ==
Giovanni Dozzini was born in 1978 in Perugia, where he lives and works.

After graduating with a degree in law and working for the Giornale dell'Umbria newspaper, he joined the editorial staff of the Corriere dell'Umbria in 2005.

He made his debut in 2005 with Il cinese della Piazza del pino (The Chinese Man in Pine Square) and subsequently published five other novels, winning the 2019 European Union Prize for Literature with E Baboucar guidava la fila (And Baboucar Led the Way).

An editor for several publishing houses, his articles have appeared in various newspapers such as Europa (newspaper) and websites such as Nazione Indiana, HuffPost, and Ondarock.

He is the coordinator of Encuentro, a festival of Spanish-language literature held every year in Perugia and Castiglione del Lago.
