= Piia Leino =

Finnish writer (born 1977)

Piia Leino (born 1977) is a Finnish writer. She studied at the University of Tampere and now lives in Helsinki where she works as a journalist. She also studied creative writing at the Kriittinen korkeakoulu (Critical Academy) in Helsinki. She has published two novels until date: Ruma Kassa (The Ugly Cashier) and Taivas (Heaven). Leino holds a Master's degree in Social Sciences. He studied at the University of Tampere, majoring in journalism and graduated in 2004. Leino's novel Taivas (2017) won the European Union Prize for Literature in 2019, and her manuscript won the S&S Publishing House's The State of the World novel competition in spring 2017. The latter won the EU Prize for Literature in 2019.
