= Hari N. Spanou =

Writer from Cyprus

Hari Spanou (born 1964) is a writer from Cyprus.

She studied medicine in Salonica, and now works as a doctor in Nicosia. Since making her literary debut in 2015, she has published several books, including Φυλάκιο (The Outpost, 2021). The novel is set against the backdrop of the 1974 Turkish invasion of Cyprus, and it was nominated for the EU Prize for Literature.
