= Kostas Hatziantoniou =

Greek writer

Kostas Hatziantoniou (Greek: Κώστας Χατζηαντωνίου; born 1965) is a Greek writer. He attended the University of Athens. His published fiction includes The Book of Black Bile (2001) and Agrigento (2009). Agrigento won the EU Prize for Literature in 2011.

== Biography ==
Kostas Hatziantoniou was born in 1965 in Rhodes, where he also grew up. He studied political sciences and public administration at the Law School of the University of Athens. He made his first appearance in literature in 1990 by the publication of the magazine “Remvi”. Since then he collaborated with all the notable literature magazines of the country, as well as with encyclopedic publications, by writing literature texts, critic essays and historical or political articles. His writing work contains narrations, historical studies, essays and novels. He has been awarded by PEN Club, by the Society of Christian Letters as well as by the essay’ s prize P. Foteas. In 2009- 2011 he had been selected as member of the Committee of the National Literature Awards of Greece. He is member of "Kostis Palamas Foundation" executive committee.

== Bibliography ==
=== Fiction ===
==== Narrative stories ====
- 1992. Jephthae’ s Daughter. Latmos Publications. Athens. P.p. 114.
- 2001. The Book of Black Bile. Paroussia Publications. Athens. P. p. 174.

==== Novel ====
- 2009. Agrigento. Ideogramma Publications (2nd edition Livanis 2011). Athens. P. p. 293.

=== Essays ===
- 1993 (2nd edition 2003). Nationalism and “Hellinikotita”. Porthmos Publications. Athens. P. p. 338.
- 2008. Against the time. Efthini Publications. Athens. P. p. 152.
- 2014. The debt and the “tokos”. Gordios Publications. Athens. P. p. 252.

=== History ===
==== Historical essays ====
- 1994 (4th edition 2004). Asia Minor. The struggle of 1919- 1922. Iolkos Publications. Athens. P. p. 512.
- 1999 (2nd edition 2009). Asia Minor. History of the ancient age. Gordios Publications. Athens. P. p. 562.
- 1999 (2nd edition 2010). Asia Minor. History of the medieval age. Gordios Publications. Athens. P. p. 332
- 1999 (3nd edition 2011). Asia Minor. History of the modern age. Gordios Publications. Athens. P. p. 614.
- 2002 (2nd edition 2007). Himara. Elikranon Editions. Tirana (Albania). P. p. 254.
- 2002 (2nd edition 2012). History of Modern Greece (1821–1941). Iolkos Publications. Athens. P. p. 398.
- 2007. Cyprus 1954–1974: From the epic to the tragedy. Iolkos Publications. Athens. P. p. 564.

==== Historical biographies ====
- 1998 (2nd edition 2006). Nicolaos Plastiras. Iolkos Publications. Athens. P. p. 263
- 2005. Theodoros Pangalos. Iolkos Publications. Athens. P. p. 391.
