= Haska Shyyan =

Ukrainian writer (born 1980)

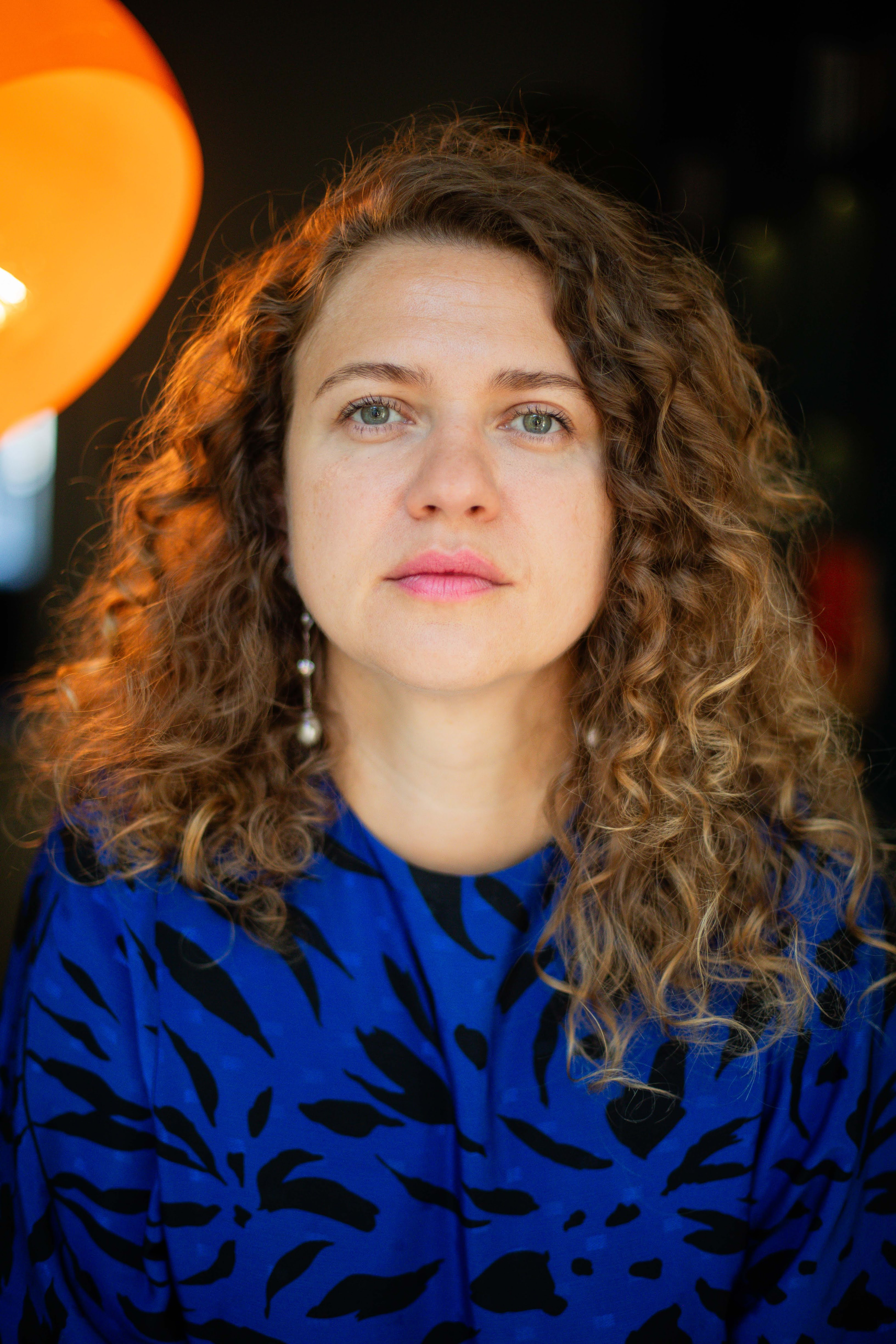
Haska Shyyan (2024)

Haska Shyyan (Ukrainian: Гаська Шиян; born 1980) is a Ukrainian writer and translator. She was born and raised in the western city of Lviv and studied classical philology at Lviv University. Her debut novel Hunt, Doctor, Hunt! was published in 2014. Much of the book was written on her mobile phone when Shyyan was ill. Her next novel Behind the Back won the EU Prize for Literature.

Shyyan lives in Kyiv.
