= Jean Back =

Luxembourgish writer

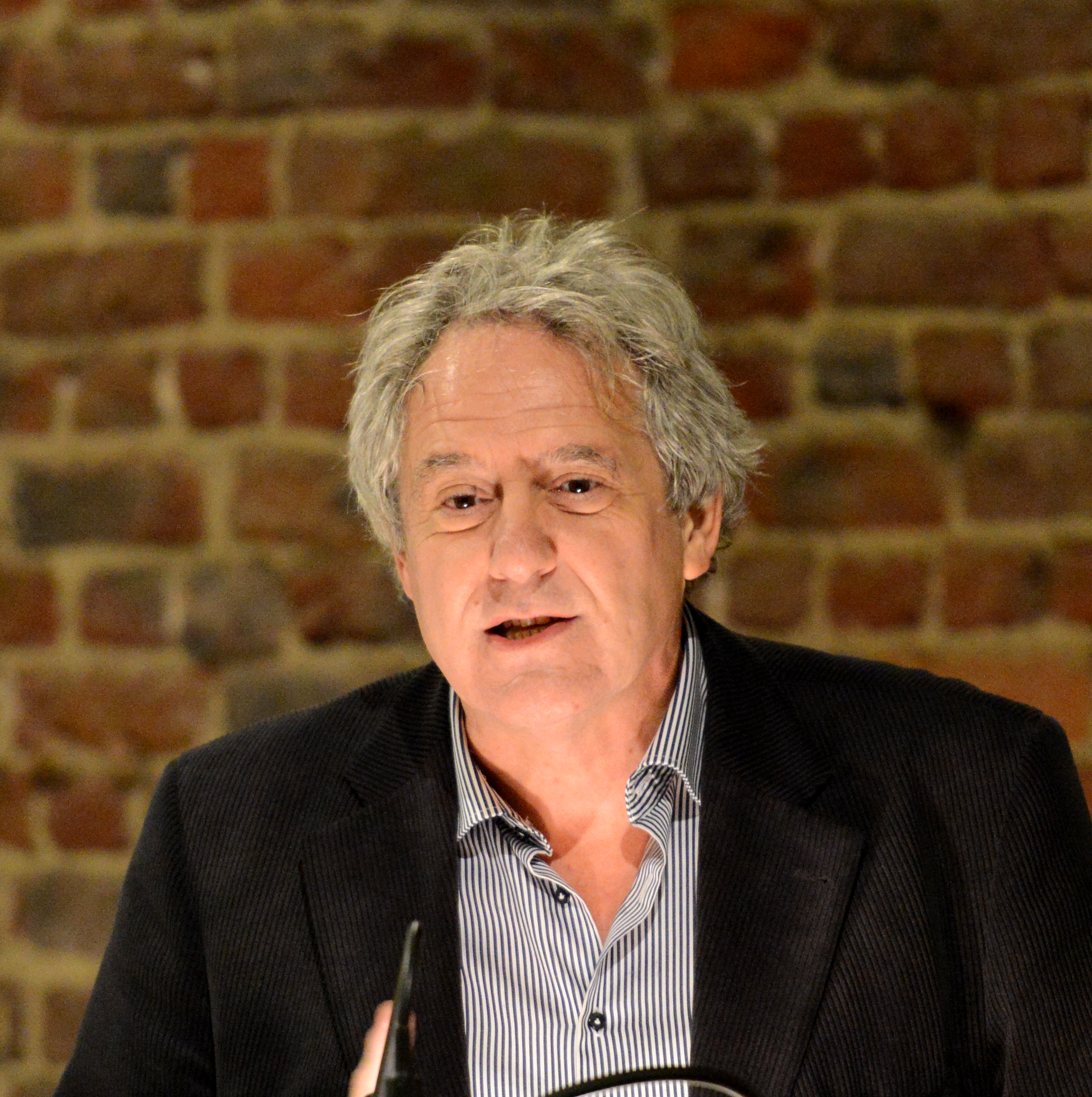
Jean Back, November 2013

Jean Back (born 1953) is a Luxembourgish writer, photographer and civil servant. He was born in Dudelange and studied in Esch-Alzette. A career civil servant, Back has met with success in creative pursuits such as photography and creative writing. His novel Amateur won the EU Prize for Literature.

== Works ==
- Wollekestol (2003)
- Mon amour schwein (2007)
- Amateur (2009)
- Wéi Dag an Nuecht (2012)
- Karamell (2014)
