= Anna Ospelt =

Anna Ospelt (born 1987) is a Liechtensteiner writer. She was born in Vaduz, where she currently lives. She went to university in Basel, Switzerland.

Her books include:

- Sammelglück (2015)
- Wurzelstudien (2020)
- Frühe Pflanzung (2023)

Wurzelstudien was nominated for the Clemens Brentano Prize. Frühe Pflanzung was nominated for the EU Prize for Literature. Ospelt received a Nature Writing Scholarship from the Nantesbuch Foundation as part of the German Prize for Nature Writing in 2019.

Ospelt has also translated works of poetry from English to German.
