= Deniz Utlu =

German writer (born 1983)

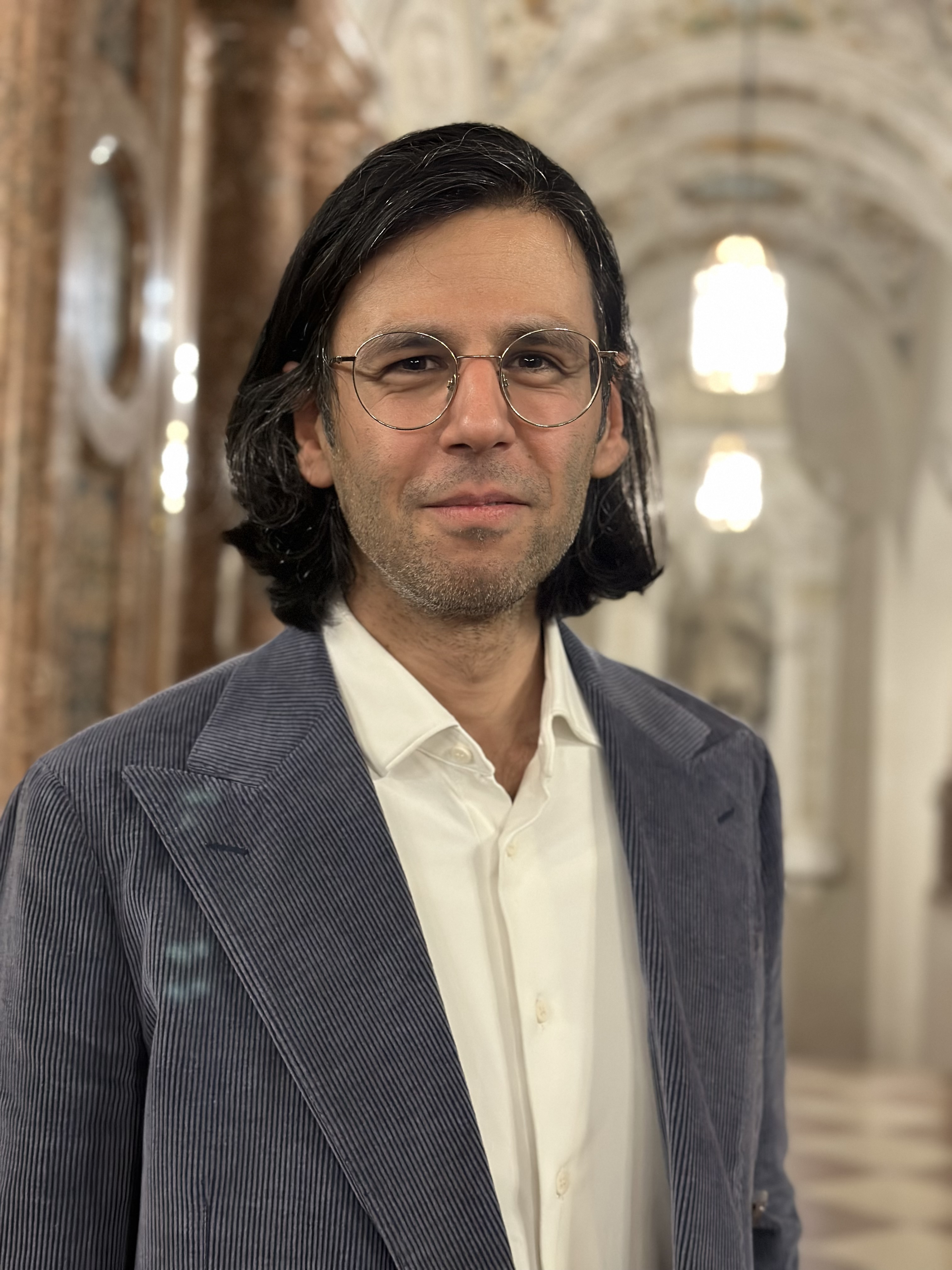
Deniz Utlu in 2023

Deniz Utlu (born 1983) is a German writer. He was born in Hannover into a Turkish immigrant family. He went to university in Berlin and Paris.

Utlu has written both fiction and non-fiction, including plays and poetry. His first two novels were Die Ungehaltenen (2014) and Gegen Morgen (2019). His third novel Vaters Meer (2023) gained him widespread acclaim. Utlu's work explores recurring themes such as memory, silence, the fragility of language, and the search for belonging in a transcultural society. Vaters Meer was praised by the jury of the Bavarian Book Prize for its "extreme precision in evoking memories – sounds, images, feelings, scraps of language – and for its layered reflection on how life stories are constructed." Vaters Meer became a critical success and won the LiteraTour Nord Prize and the Bavarian Book Prize. It also received a special mention at the 2024 edition of the European Union Prize for Literature.

Utlu lives in Berlin. He ran the cultural magazine freitext between 2003 and 2013.

== Memberships ==
- 2026 Member of the Academy of Arts, Berlin

== Bibliography ==
- Utlu, Deniz (2014). Die Ungehaltenen: Roman (in German). Berlin: List Taschenbuch. ISBN 978-3-548-61269-0.
- —— (2019). Gegen Morgen: Roman (in German). Berlin: Suhrkamp. ISBN 978-3-518-42898-6.
- —— (2023). Vaters Meer: Roman (in German). Berlin: Suhrkamp Verlag. ISBN 978-3-518-43144-3.
