= Nathalie Skowronek =

Belgian writer (born 1973)

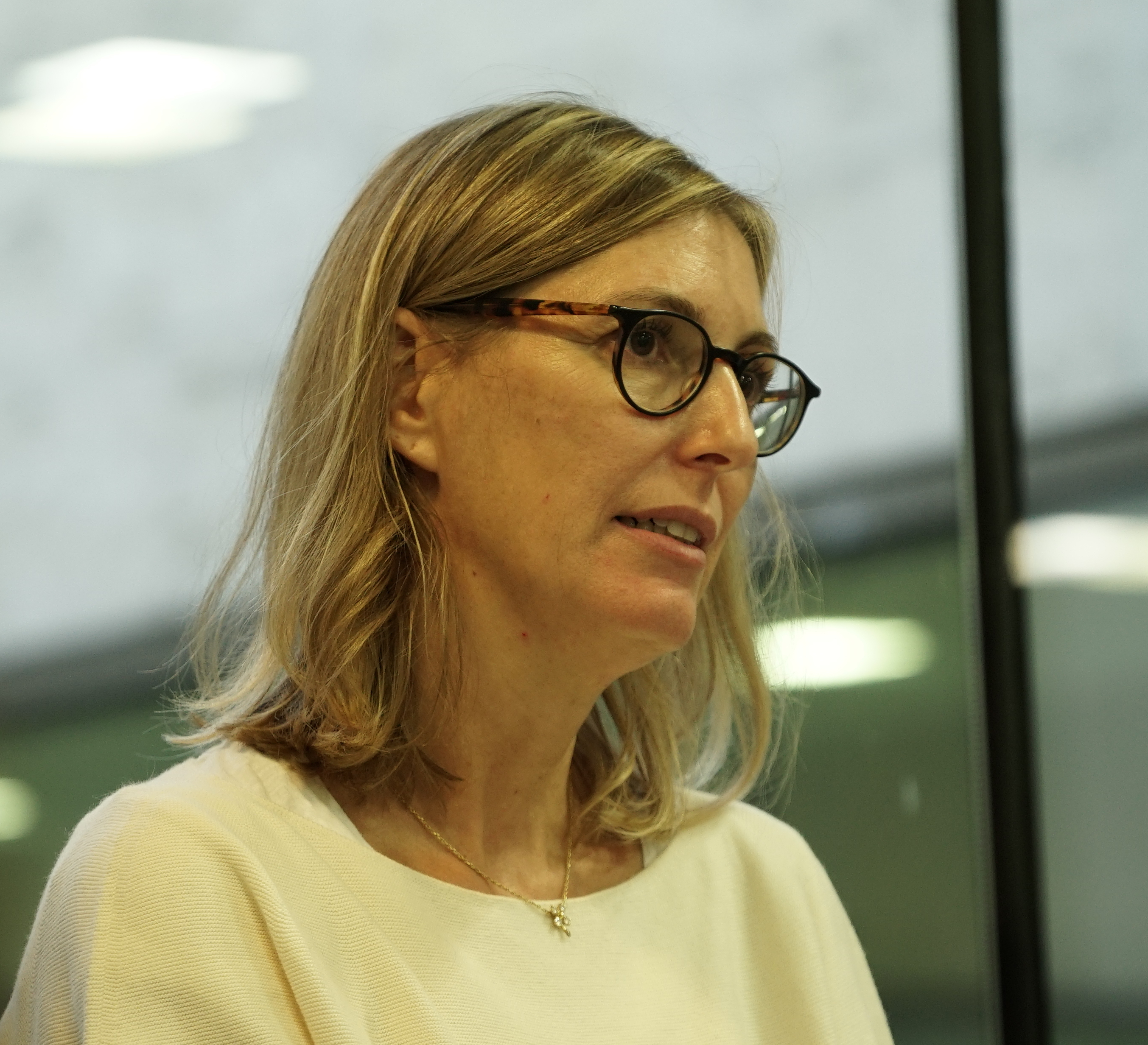
Nathalie Skowronek

Nathalie Skowronek is a Belgian writer. She was born in Brussels in 1973. She studied literature at university, and worked in publishing and fashion. In 2004, she formed the imprint "La Plume et le Pinceau" for the publisher Complexe. Her first novel Karen et moi (Arléa, 2011) was the first volume of a trilogy. It was followed by Max, en apparence (Arléa, 2013) and Un monde sur mesure (Grasset, 2017). She won the EU Prize for Literature for her book La carte des regrets.

Since 2016, she has been teaching in the Contemporary Writing Centre of La Cambre/École nationale supérieure des arts visuels.
