= Armin Öhri =

Liechtensteiner writer (born 1978)

Armin Öhri (born September 23, 1978) is a Liechtensteiner writer who was among the winners of the 2014 European Union Prize for Literature. He received it for Die dunkle Muse (The Dark Muse), the first novel of a crime series. Armin Öhri grew up in Ruggell and works in Switzerland. He has been active since 2009. His works are influenced by 19th century crime fiction. He is a best-selling author in Liechtenstein.

== Life ==
Armin Öhri was born on 23 September 1978 and grew up in Ruggell in Liechtenstein. He studied history, philosophy and German linguistics and literature at the University of Bern. Öhri lives in Switzerland, where he works in education at a business school. Öhri has been active as a writer since 2009. His works are influenced by 19th century crime fiction.

Öhri' is a bestselling author in Liechtenstein. His work includes stories and novels. His debut novel was published by van Eck Verlag in 2009, and was called Das Nachtvolk. He switched to German publishing house Gmeiner in 2011.

In 2014 Öhri was awarded the European Union Prize for Literature for his crime novel Die dunkle Muse (The Dark Muse). The book was the first of a series of linked chronological historical crime novels. It is set in Berlin in 1865, and the protagonist is a student, Julius Bentheim, solving the question of why a philosophy professor murdered a prostitute. His works have been translated internationally, and were bestsellers in Spain and South America.

With author Daniel Batliner, Öhri founded Literatursalon in 2011, an organisation which hosts events and a website profiling Liechtenstein authors and writing. He also founded the Liechtenstein Authors' Association 'IG Wort'.

== Works ==
- Das Nachtvolk. Erzählung. Van Eck-Verlag 2009. ISBN 978-3905881028
- Die Entführung. Erzählung. Gmeiner-Verlag 2010, ISBN 978-3905881097
- Sinfonie des Todes. Historischer Kriminalroman. Gmeiner-Verlag 2011, ISBN 978-3-8392-1145-8
- Die dunkle Muse. Julius Bentheims erster Fall. Historischer Kriminalroman. Gmeiner-Verlag 2012, ISBN 978-3-8392-1295-0. Translated into Albanian, Spanish, Italian and Croatian.
- Der Bund der Okkultisten. Julius Bentheims zweiter Fall. Historischer Kriminalroman. Gmeiner-Verlag 2014, ISBN 978-3-8392-1500-5
- Die Dame im Schatten. Julius Bentheims dritter Fall. Historischer Kriminalroman. Gmeiner-Verlag 2015, ISBN 978-3-8392-1729-0
- Die letzte Reise der Hindenburg. Kurzroman. E-Book, Gmeiner-Verlag, 2016 ISBN 978-3-7349-9213-1
- Professor Harpers Expedition. Historischer Roman. E-Book, Gmeiner-Verlag, 2016 ISBN 978-3-7349-9223-0
- Liechtenstein. Klein, aber oho Herausgeber. Gmeiner-Verlag, 2016, ISBN 978-3-8392-1986-7
- Liechtenstein. Roman einer Nation. Zeitgeschichtlicher Kriminalroman. Gmeiner-Verlang 2016, ISBN 978-3-8392-1978-2
