= Inga Žolude =

Latvian writer and translator (born 1984)

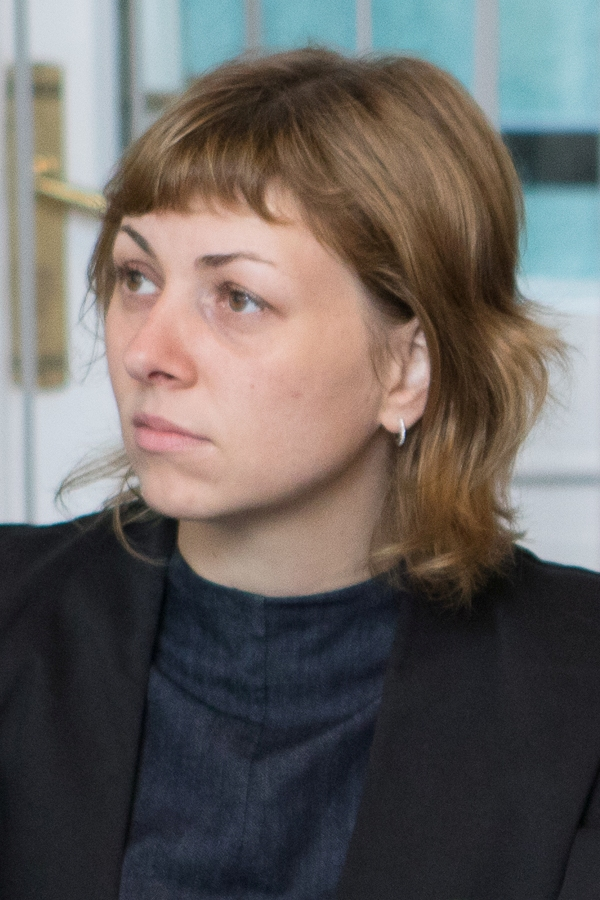
- Žolude in 2017
- Born: 9 August 1984 (age 42); Rīga, Latvian SSR
- Education: University of Latvia
- Occupations: Writer, translator
- Years active: 2002-present

Inga Žolude (born August 9, 1984) is a Latvian writer and translator. She studied English literature at the University of Latvia, before winning a Fulbright scholarship to attend Southern Illinois University in the USA. At present, she is pursuing a PhD at the University of Latvia.

Žolude's first novel Silta zeme (Warm Earth) was published in 2008. She has written two more novels since: Sarkanie bērni (Red Children, 2012) and Santa Biblia (2013). Red Children won the Latvian Writers' Union prize as well as the Raimonds Gerkens prize.

Žolude has published several collections of short stories. She won the EU Prize for Literature for her 2010 collection Mierinājums Ādama kokam (A Solace for the Adam’s Tree). She has also written several plays.

As a translator, Žolude has translated works by Philip Larkin and Robert Crawford. Her work has been translated into numerous languages, including English, German, French, Swedish, Polish, Lithuanian, Hungarian, Czech and Bulgarian.

She has participated in the Prose Readings' festival several times, winning the main prize in 2013 for her short story "Writers' House". In 2015, her second collection of short stories "Stories" was published, containing seven long stories. The book has been nominated for the Literature Award in the "Best Prose Work" category.

Žolude has been a member of the Latvian Writers' Union since 2010.
