= Kallia Papadaki =

Greek author and screenwriter (born 1978)

Kallia Papadaki (born 1978) is a Greek author and screenwriter. Born in the border town of Didymoteicho, she grew up in Thessaloniki. She moved to the USA, where she studied economics at Bard College and Brandeis University. Moving back to Greece, she studied film at the Stavrakos Film School in Athens.

Papadaki's first feature script September premiered at the 48th Karlovy Vary International Film Festival. Her 2015 novel Dendrites won the EU Prize for Literature. Other books include The Back-Lot Sound (short stories) and Lavender in December (poetry).
