= Makis Tsitas =

Greek writer (born 1971)

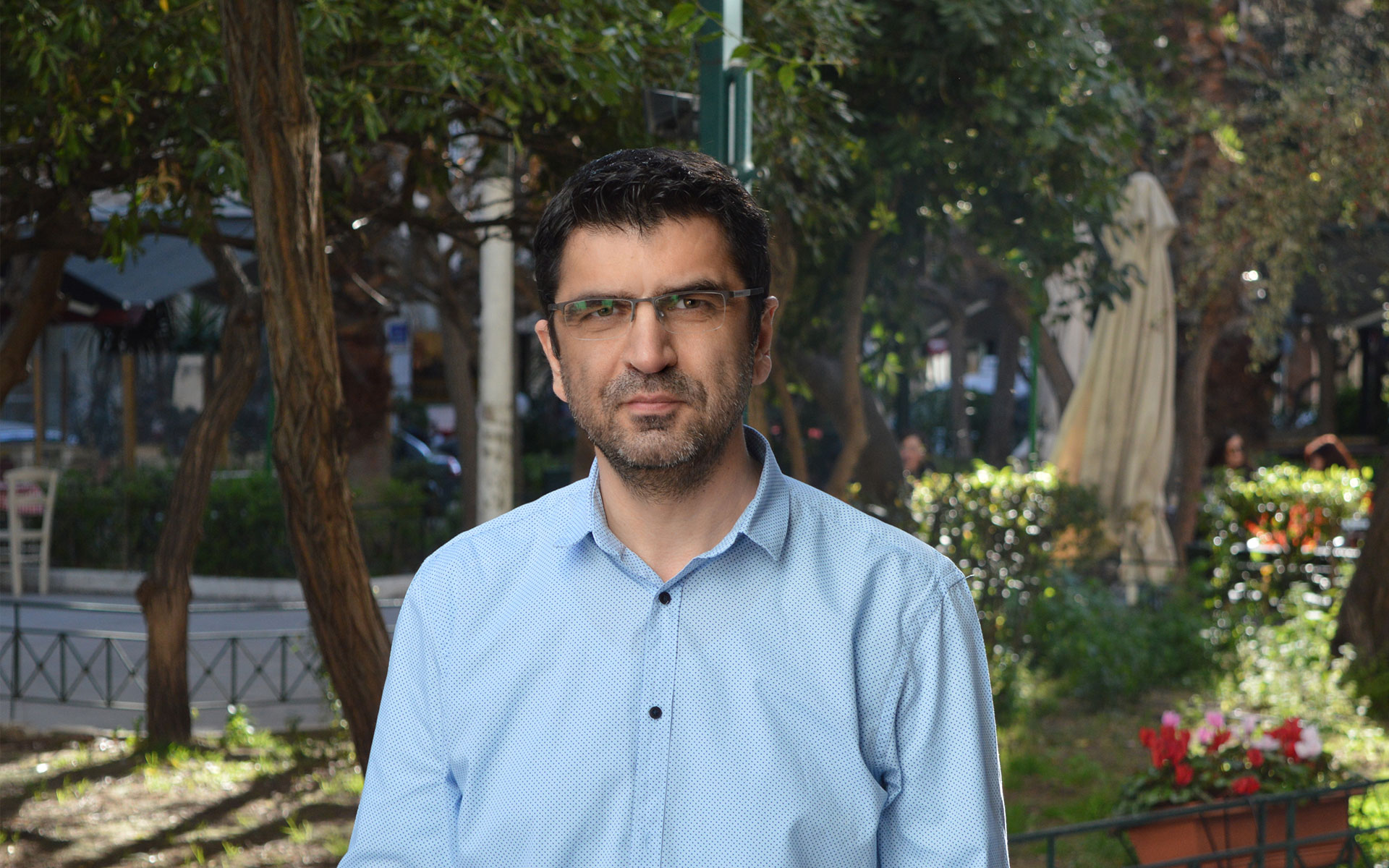
Makis Tsitas

Makis Tsitas (Greek: Μάκης Τσίτας; born 1971) is a Greek writer. He was born in Yiannitsa and went to university in Thessaloniki. He has published five books for adults and 32 books for children. His debut novel God Is My Witness was published in 2013, translated into 12 languages and won the EU Prize for Literature.

Short stories and books for children have been translated into many languages.

He lives in Athens.

== Background ==
Makis Tsiitas born in Yiannitsa and majored in Journalism and cooperated with several radio stations in Thessaloniki. As of 1994 he resides permanently in Athens and works in publishing. He has served as Senior Editor for the literary magazine Periplous (1994-2005), and was the Co-publisher and Director of the journal for the book Index (2006-2011). Ever since 2012 he has been directing Diastixo.gr, a website on books and culture. He is also a member of the Administrative Council of the Hellenic Authors’ Society. His literary works have been included in anthologies, published in magazines and newspapers, and translated into several European languages, including German, French, Spanish, English, Hebrew, Albanian, Swedish, Finnish, and Italian. Some of his works have also been staged and directed by Roula Pateraki (Pireaus Municipal Theater), Tatiana Lygari (Theater To treno sto Rouf, viva.gr), Ersi Vasilikioti (“Theatro ton Keron”), Sophia Karagianni (“Vault Theater”), Taru Makela (Christine and Goran Schildt Foundation, Ekenäs, Finland), Alexandru Mazgareanu (“Nottara Theater,” Bucharest) and Maria Veselinova (Theater «Vazrazhdane», Sofia). His lyrics have been put to music by Giorgos Stavrianos, Takis Soukas, and Tatiana Zografou. He has published twenty books for children and three for adults. His novel God Is My Witness, has earned him the 2014 European Union Prize for Literature and honors by the Municipalities of Athens, Pella, and Edessa, the Central Public Library of Edessa, as well as the Region of Central Macedonia. God Is My Witness is already available in 12 European languages.

== Books ==
For adults

- The General is Causing Trouble in the Square. Kapa. 2022. ISBN 978-960-628-165-5.
- God is my witness (New ed.). Metaixmio. 2020. ISBN 978-618-03-2296-5.
- Five stops. Metaixmio. 2020. ISBN 978-618-03-2298-9.
- The Again. Patakis. 2015. ISBN 978-960-16-6508-5.
- God is my witness. Kichli. 2013. ISBN 978-618-5004-10-1.
- Patty from Petroula. Kastaniotis. 1996. ISBN 978-960-03-1487-8.

For kids

- Why aren't you asleep, Mama?. Metaichmio. 2024. ISBN 978-618-03-4120-1.
- Our traditions, 4: Carols. Psichogios. 2023. ISBN 978-618-01-5168-8.
- Our traditions, 3: Riddles. Psichogios. 2023. ISBN 978-618-01-5166-4.
- The King's Councillor. Metaichmio. 2023. ISBN 978-618-03-3562-0.
- Our traditions, 2: Tongue Twisters. Psichogios. 2022. ISBN 978-618-01-4504-5.
- Our traditions, 1: Proverbs. Psichogios. 2022. ISBN 978-618-01-4502-1.
- The Giant is Coming. Metaichmio. 2022. ISBN 978-618-03-2755-7.
- The best granny of all. Psychogios. 2021. ISBN 978-618-01-3962-4.
- Haralambia the Giraffe. Metaixmio. 2020. ISBN 978-618-03-2421-1.
- Dora and the cat that was called Ulysses. Minoas. 2020. ISBN 978-618-02-1364-5.
- The brave knight and the smiling queen. Kalendis. 2019. ISBN 978-960-594-057-7.
- My Grandpa. Patakis. 2019. ISBN 978-960-16-8025-5.
- In Front of the Television. Psichogios. 2019. ISBN 978-618-01-2596-2.
- And I take off my hat. Kokkini klosti demeni. 2018. ISBN 978-618-5151-58-4.
- The birthday present. Psichogios. 2018. ISBN 978-618-01-2285-5.
- A little celebrity. Psichogios. 2017. ISBN 978-618-01-1783-7.
- My own daddy. Patakis. 2017. ISBN 978-960-16-6885-7.
- My name is Dora. Minoas. 2017. ISBN 978-618-02-0775-0.
- My big brother. Psichogios. 2015. ISBN 978-618-01-1219-1.
- Find who i am!. Patakis. 2014. ISBN 978-960-16-5890-2.
- Stray Kostas. Psichogios. 2014. ISBN 978-618-01-0443-1.
- By heart. Psichogios. 2014. ISBN 978-618-01-0214-7.
- Oh, these parents!. Psichogios. 2013. ISBN 978-960-496-814-5.
- Don't trouble Santa Claus. Psichogios. 2012. ISBN 978-960-496-874-9.
- Take me with you too!. Psichogios. 2012. ISBN 978-960-496-692-9.
- Why don't you count some sheep?. Psichogios. 2011. ISBN 978-960-496-274-7.
- Don't go. Psichogios. 2009. ISBN 978-960-453-505-7.
- The little red one. Kastor. 2006. ISBN 978-960-7906-67-0.
- Friends. Psichogios. 2006. ISBN 978-960-453-103-5.
- I don't like milk!. Psichogios. 2005. ISBN 978-960-274-880-0.
- Whose soup is this?. Psichogios. 2005. ISBN 978-960-274-881-7.
- Christmas at kindergarten. Patakis. 2005. ISBN 978-960-423-975-7.
- Dora and Ulysses. Helinika grammata. 2004. ISBN 978-960-406-902-6.

== Awards and Honorary Events ==
- European Union Prize for Literature (2014)
- Honorary Event from Municipality of Pella (2015)
- Honorary Event from City of Athens (2015)
- Honorary Event from municipality of Edessa (2016)
- Honorary Event from Region of Central Macedonia (2016)
- Honorary Event from Central Public Library of Edessa (2016)
- Award of the Greek Section of IBBY, International Board of Books for Young People – Greek Children’s Book Circle (2023)
- Hartis Journal’s prize for best children’s book (2024)
