= Emilios Solomou =

Cypriot writer (born 1971)

Emilios Solomou (born 1971) is a Cypriot writer. He was born in Nicosia but grew up in the village of Potami. He studied at the University of Athens. Having worked in newspaper journalism for a few years, he now teaches Greek and history in a high school. He has also served on the boards of the literary magazine Anef and the Union of Cyprus Writers.

His novels include:

- An Axe in Your Hands (winner, Cyprus State Prize for Literature)
- The Diary of an Infidelity (winner, EU Prize for Literature)
- Like a Sparrow, Quickly You Passed

He has been translated into English and Bulgarian.
