= Karen Gillece =

Irish writer (born 1974)

Karen Gillece (born 1974 in Dublin) is an Irish writer. She studied law at University College Dublin and worked for several years in the telecommunications industry before turning to writing full-time. She has written four novels and her short stories have been widely published in literary journals and magazines. She has been described by The Irish Times as "an emerging force to be reckoned with", and by the Irish Independent as "the queen of emerging Irish writers", and her work as being "clever and compelling". She lives in Dublin.

== Awards and honors ==
- 2009: European Union Prize for Literature, Longshore Drift
- 2001: Hennessy New Irish Writing Award, shortlist

== Bibliography ==
- Seven Nights in Zaragoza (2005)
- Longshore Drift (2006)
- My Glass Heart (2007)
- The Absent Wife (2008)
- The Boy That Never Was (2014) as Karen Perry in collaboration with Paul Perry. ISBN 9781405912907
