= Mila Pavićević =

Croatian writer (born 1988)

Mila Pavićević (born 1988) is a Croatian writer. She was born and raised in Dubrovnik, and studied at the University of Zagreb. Active in writing from an early age, she won the EU Prize for Literature for her book Ice Girl and Other Fairy-tales.
