= Jacobo Bergareche =

Spanish novelist, poet, and screenwriter

Jacobo Bergareche (born 1976) is a Spanish writer. Born in London, he studied Fine Arts in Madrid (Universidad Complutense) and Writing, Literature and Publishing at Emerson College, Boston.

He has produced, written and created several fiction shows and docuseries for the main Spanish networks, and he is a regular contributor of columns and stories for several Spanish newspapers and magazines.

== Published books ==
- Playas (poetry, 2004)
- Coma (play, 2015),
- Aventuras en Bodytown (children's book series)
- Estaciones de regreso (autofiction, 2019)
- Los días perfectos (novel, 2021).
- Las despedidas (novel, 2023).
- Amistad (essay, co-authored with Mariano Sigman, 2025)

Estaciones de regreso deals with the murder of his brother. Los dias perfectos centres around the love life of William Faulkner. For the latter book, he conducted research at the Harry Ransom Center, while living in Austin, Texas. The book won the EU Prize for Literature.

Bergareche now lives in Madrid.
