= Peter Karoshi =

Austrian writer (born 1975)

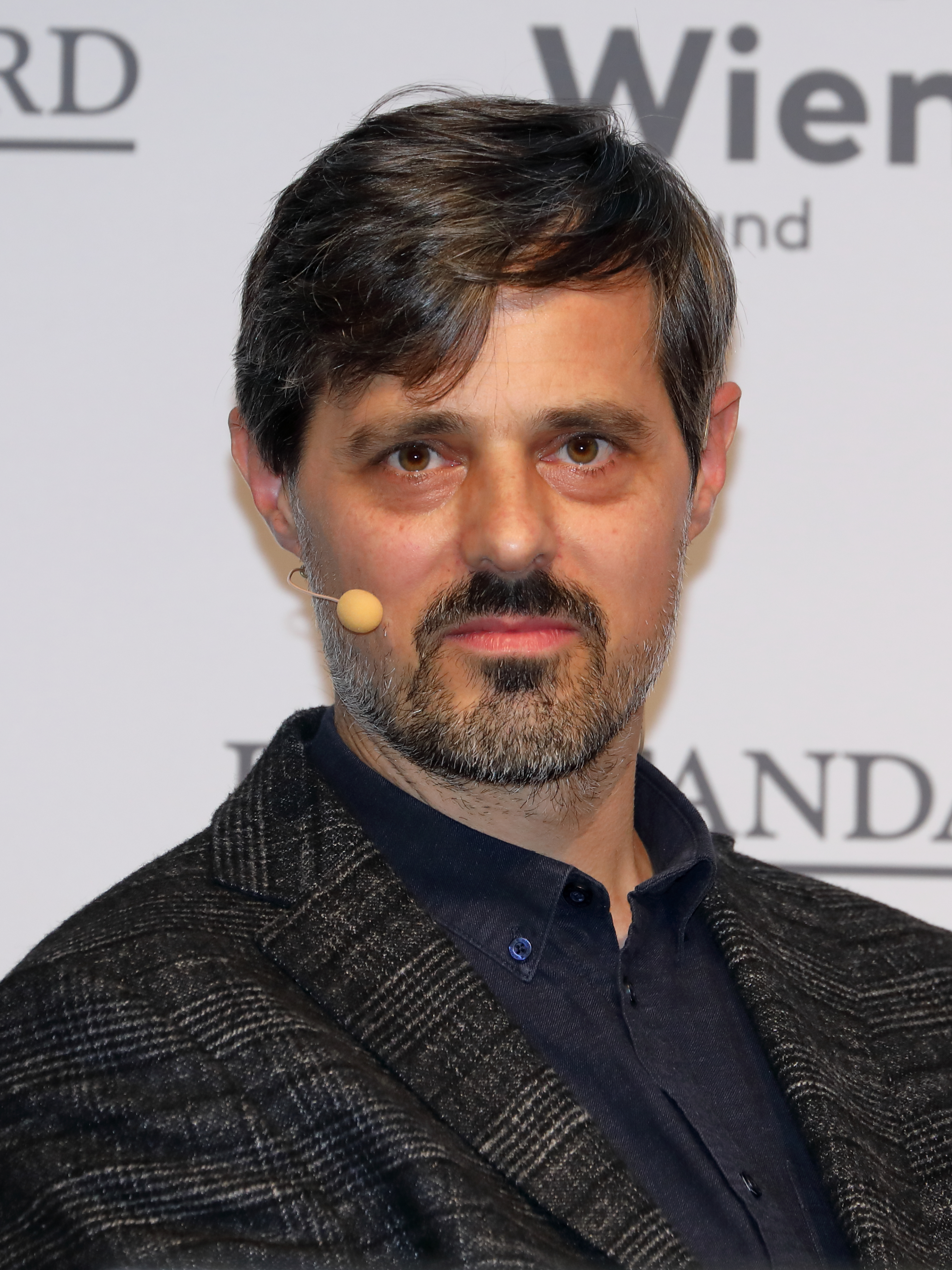
Karoshi in 2022

Peter Karoshi (born 1975) is an Austrian writer born and raised in Graz. He studied history, English and American studies at the University of Graz. Afterwards, he continued his education in Vienna and Central Europe, where he researched from 1999 until 2005, when he started writing his debut novel. In 2009, his first novel Grünes, grünes Gras lit. 'Green, green Grass' was published in German in 2009 by Milena Verlag.

His second novel, Zu den Elephants lit. 'The Elephants' was published by Leykam Buchverlag, and was nominated for the German Book Prize in August 2021, and the EU Prize for Literature. Karoshi lives in Vienna.

== Style ==
Karoshi has been praised for his magical creation of characters especially in his novella, The Elephants. Sabrina Siebert said that he "creates a plot framework around the journey of the two characters that is difficult to grasp and that triggers melancholy."
