= Daina Opolskaitė =

Lithuanian writer (born 1979)

Daina Opolskaitė-Kovalčikienė (born 1979) is a Lithuanian writer.

She was born in Vilkaviškis. She graduated from the Lithuanian University of Educational Sciences. She made her literary debut in 2000, with a collection of short stories entitled Drožlės. Since then, she has become a well-known writer of young adult literature. Another short story collection Dienų piramidės (published in 2019) won the EU Prize for Literature.

She works as a high school teacher in Pilviškiai.
