= Paulus Hochgatterer =

Austrian writer and psychiatrist

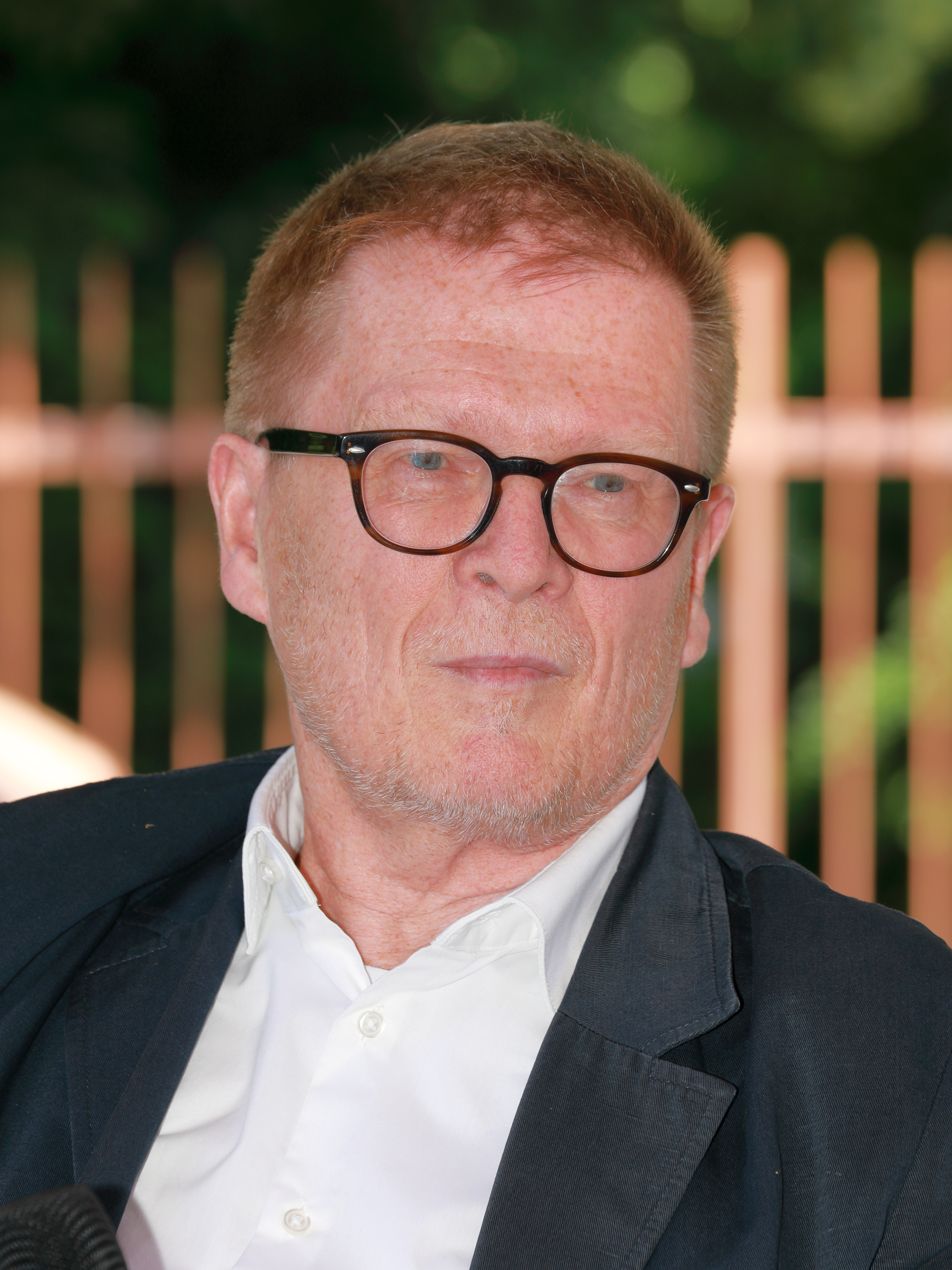
Paulus Hochgatterer in 2024 in Vienna, Austria

Paulus Hochgatterer (born 16 July 1961) is an Austrian writer and psychiatrist. He is the author of several novels and story collections. One of his novels called Die Süsse des Lebens won the EU Prize for Literature. It was translated into English as The Sweetness of Life by Jamie Bulloch.
