= Carolina Schutti =

Austrian writer (born 1976)

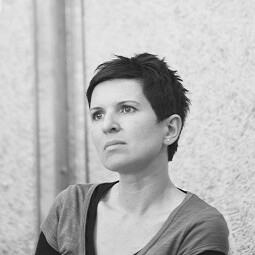
Carolina Schutti (2012)

Carolina Schutti (born 1976) is an Austrian writer. Born in Innsbruck, she studied an eclectic range of subjects: German philology, English and American Studies, and music. She obtained her PhD on the work of the Nobel Prize-winning writer Elias Canetti. She then taught at the University of Florence, before joining Literaturhaus am Inn as a researcher. She has published widely on literary matters. Schutti received the 2015 EU Prize for Literature for her novel Einmal muss ich über weiches Gras gelaufen sein (Once I must have trodden soft grass).
