= Tullio Forgiarini =

Luxembourgish writer (born 1966)

- Born: 1966 (age 58–59) Neudorf, Luxembourg
- Occupation: Writer
- Notable awards: European Union Prize for Literature (2013)

Tullio Forgiarini (born 1966) is a Luxembourgish writer. He was born in Neudorf, Luxembourg to an Italian father and a Luxembourgish mother. He studied history in Luxembourg and Strasbourg, and works as a teacher at the Lycée du Nord in Wiltz, Luxembourg.

Forgiarini has written several novels. His book Amok. Eng Lëtzebuerger Liebeschronik (Amok. A Luxembourg love story) won the EU Prize for Literature in 2013.
