= Laurence Plazenet =

French novelist

Laurence Plazenet (born June 22, 1968) is a French novelist. She was born in Paris and studied at the Ecole Normale Supérieure. A literature PhD, she taught at Sorbonne, and studied at Princeton University. She has written three novels:

- L’amour seul
- La Blessure et la soif
- Disproportion de l’homme

She won the European Union Prize for Literature for L’amour seul.
