= Osvalds Zebris =

Latvian writer and journalist

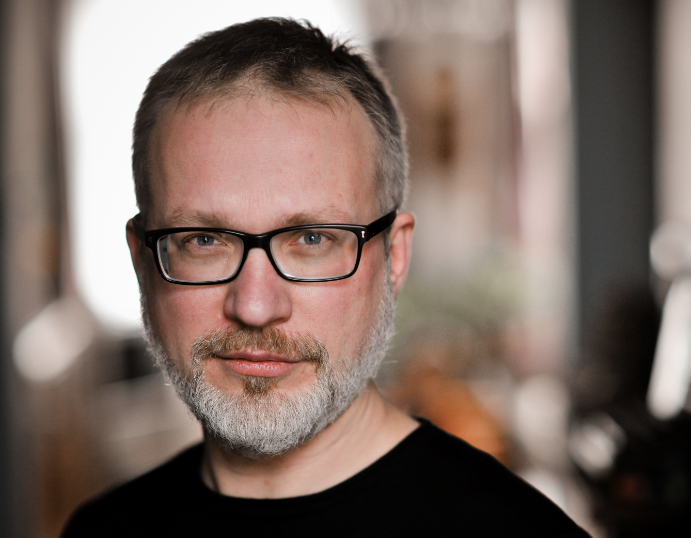
Osvalds Zebris

Osvalds Zebris (born 21 February 1975) is a Latvian writer and journalist. He studied economics at university, before commencing a career in public relations and communications.

His first book was a collection of short stories titled Brīvība tīklos. It won a Latvian Literature Award in 2010. Zebris has also written three novels, one of which titled Gaiļu kalna ēnā (In the Shadow of Rooster Hill) was nominated for the Latvian Literature Award in 2015 and won an EU Prize for Literature in 2017.

Zebris is a member of the Latvian Writers' Union.
