= Paavo Matsin =

Estonian writer and literary critic

Paavo Matsin (born 4 April 1970) is an Estonian writer and literary critic. An experimental writer, his first work Doktor Schwarz. Alkeemia 12 võtit appeared in 2011. His second novel was Sinine kaardivägi (The Blue Guard, 2013), followed by Gogol's Disco which won the EU Prize for Literature.
