= Georgi Bardarov =

Bulgarian scientist and writer

- Occupation: scientist

Georgi Kostadinov Bardarov (Bulgarian: Георги Костадинов Бърдаров) is a Bulgarian scientist and writer. He teaches in the Geology and Geography department of Sofia University, where he is also vice-dean. His debut novel Аз още броя дните (I Am Still Counting the Days) came out of the first intellectual reality show on Bulgarian television (The Manuscript) which Bardarov won in 2015. The book is based on a real-life cross-cultural romance during the siege of Sarajevo in the Bosnian civil war.

Bardarov's second novel Absolvo Te (2020) won the 2021 EU Prize for Literature.

A well-known public personality, Bardarov also teaches public speaking and is part of the publishing and production company Musagena.
