= Richard Pupala =

Slovak writer

Richard Pupala is a Slovak writer. He studied at Comenius University and the Academy of Performing Arts in Bratislava. Pupala lives in Bratislava.

Pupala has published three collections of short stories to date:

- Návštevy (Visits, 2014)
- Čierny zošit (The Black Notebook, 2017)
- Ženy aj muži, zvieratá (Women and Men, Animals, 2020)

All three books were nominated for the Anasoft Litera Prize. Ženy aj muži, zvieratá was also nominated for the EU Prize for Literature.
