= Petar Andonovski =

Macedonian writer

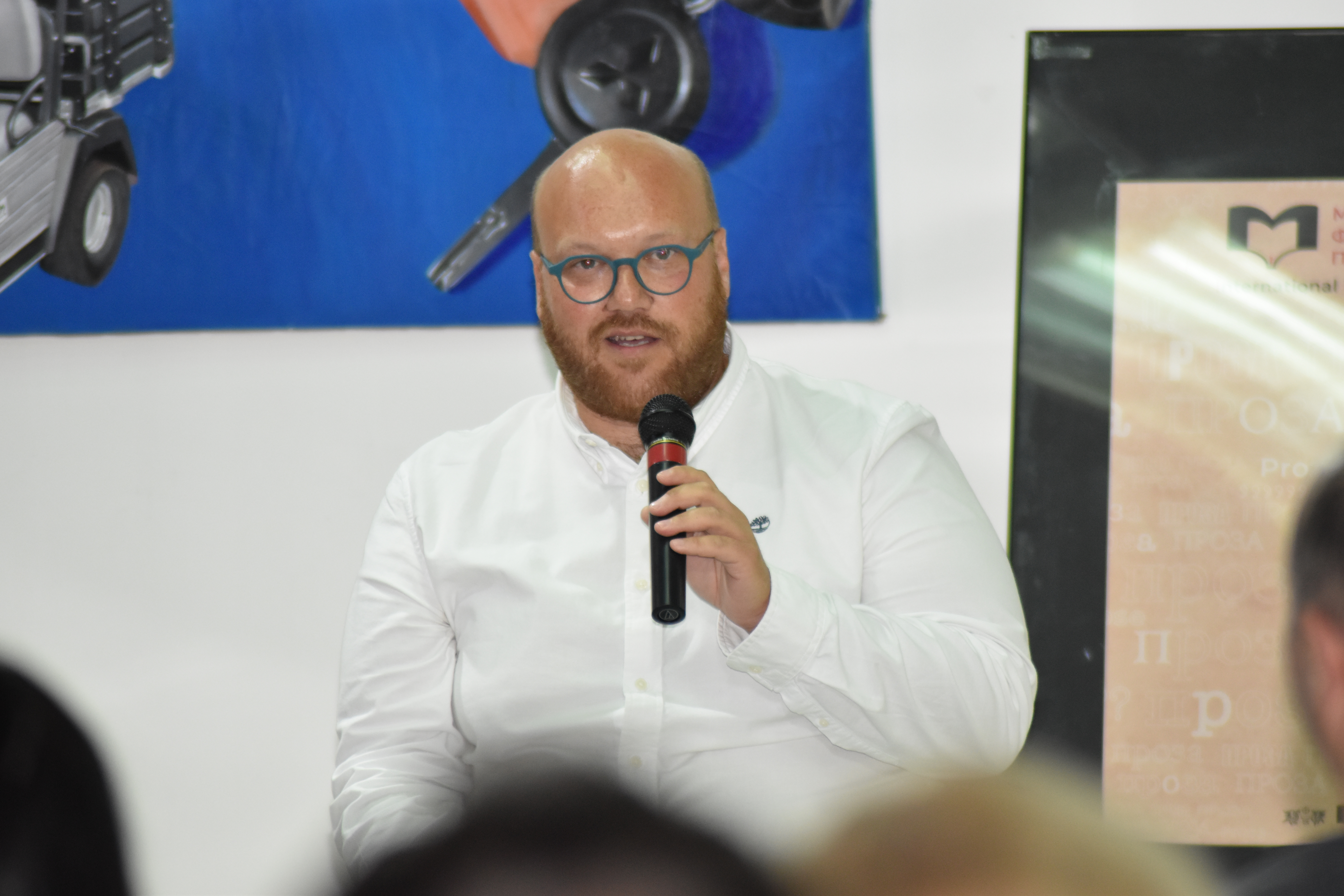
Petar Andonovski in 2022

Petar Andonovski (born 1987, Kumanovo) is a writer from North Macedonia.

He studied literature in Skopje, and now works for the Polica publishing house. He is known for the following works:

- the novel Телото во кое треба да се живее (The Body One Must Live In), winner of the 2015 National Novel of the Year Award
- Ментален простор (Mental Space, poetry collection, 2008)
- Oчи со боја на чевли (Shoe-colored Eyes, novel, 2013).

He won the 2020 EU Prize for Literature for the novel СТРАВ ОД ВАРВАРИ.
