= Shpëtim Selmani =

Shpëtim Selmani (born 1986) is a Kosovan writer and actor. He studied at the University of Prishtina. He has acted on stage at both home and abroad. His books include:

- Shënimet e një Grindaveci (Hot-tempered Notes) in 2015
- Selected Poems 2010-2017 – Poetry in Time of Blood and Despair (Multimedia, Prishtina) in 2017
- Libërthi i dashurisë (Booklet of Love) published in 2019 by Armagedoni in Prishtina

Libërthi i dashurisë won the 2020 EU Prize for Literature.
