= Iren Nigg =

Liechtenstein writer

Iren Nigg (born 1955) is a Liechtensteiner writer. She travelled widely before studying journalism at the University of Fribourg in Switzerland. She first started publishing short works of fiction in literary magazines, and published her first book Fieberzeit in 1988. Her second book Man wortet sich die Orte selbst appeared in 2006; it won the EU Prize for Literature. She has also published numerous short pieces.

== Life ==
Nigg was born in 1955 in Schaan, in Lichtenstein, and grew up there. She was educated at the Höhere Töchterschule St. Elisabeth. After travelling, Nigg studied journalism at the Institut für Journalistik und Kommunikation, University of Fribourg in Switzerland. After finishing her studies in 1984, she worked for newspapers and in public relations. She wrote often on equal rights, and women’s suffrage (Liechtenstein women did not gain the vote until 1984). Nigg published a series of women's portraits in the "Liechtensteiner Volksblatt," and in the late 1990s she worked for Aktion Miteinander. This association was campaigning for equal rights for foreign nationals in Liechtenstein, especially Vietnamese.

== Work ==
Nigg’s first published writing was in literary magazines in 1987. She published a book, Fieberzeit in 1988, and then published little for some years. Nineteen short pieces of prose text by Nigg were published in 2005 in a regional anthology. Her second book, Man wortet sich die Orte selbst (Wording the Places Oneself), was published in 2006. It won the EU Prize for Literature in 2011. Her work is noted for its simplicity and word play. When asked to talk about her writing after winning the EU Prize, Nigg described herself as “allergic” to interviews or discussing her writing, and preferred to sing instead.
