= Laura Vinogradova =

Latvian writer

Laura Vinogradova (born 1984) is a Latvian writer. She studied business at Riga Technical University. Coming to writing rather late, she published her first book in 2017: a children's book titled Snīpulītis no Snīpuļciema (Baby Long Nose from the Long Nose Village). She followed this up with two books of short stories: izelpas (exhalations, 2018) and Lāču kalns (Bear Hill, 2018). Her most recent book Upe (The River, 2020) was shortlisted for the Annual Latvian Literature Award; it also won the 2021 EU Prize for Literature.

Vinogradova lives in Riga where she works in a museum.
