= Nikos Chryssos =

Greek writer

Nikos Chryssos (Greek: Νίκος Χρυσός; born 1972) is a Greek writer. He was born in Athens and studied biology at the National and Kapodistrian University of Athens. He also studied film direction. His books include The Secret of the Last Page (Το μυστικό της τελευταίας σελίδας, Kastaniotis Editions 2009) and New Day (Καινούργια μέρα, Kastaniotis Editions 2018). New Day won the EU Prize for Literature in 2019.

Chryssos has edited works by the Greek writer Lefteris Alexiou. He lives in Athens where he runs a used bookshop.
