= Lusine Kharatyan =

Armenian writer and anthropologist

Lusine Kharatyan (Armenian: Լուսինե Խառատյան) is an Armenian writer and anthropologist. She studied at Yerevan State University, Cairo Demographic Center, and the University of Minnesota. She is known for her works of fiction, among which are:

- ծուռ գիրք (The Oblique Book, novel, 2017)
- Անմոռուկի փակուղի (Dead End Forget-me-not, short stories, 2020)
- Սիրիավեպ (A Syrian Affair, novel)

A Syrian Affair was a winner of the EU Prize for Literature. Kharatyan is based in Yerevan.
