= Theis Ørntoft =

Danish author (born 1984)

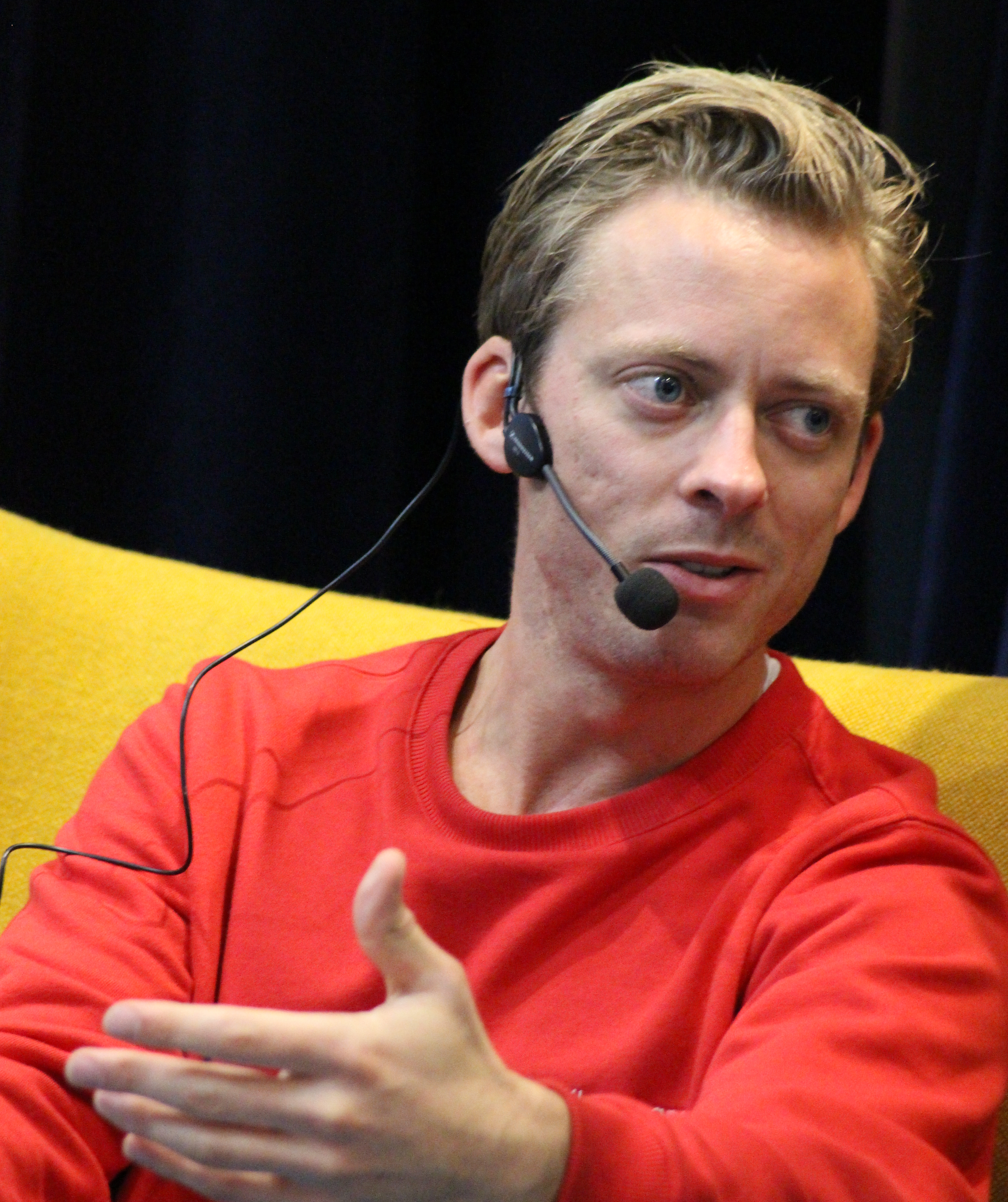
Theis Ørntoft at Bogforum 2018

Theis Ørntoft (born 1984) is a Danish writer. He made his name as a poet with two poetry collections: Yeahsuiten (2009) and Digte 2014 (2014). His first novel Solar appeared in 2018. His second novel Jordisk won the 2024 EU Prize for Literature.
