= Vladimir Jankovski =

Macedonian writer and translator (born 1977)

Vladimir Jankovski (born 1977) is a Macedonian writer and translator. He studied literature at the Ss. Cyril and Methodius University of Skopje. As a translator, Jankovski has rendered The Penelopiad by Margaret Atwood into English.

== Selected publications ==
- Eternal Present Time (2010)
- Invisible Loves (2015)
- Hidden Desires, Restless Travels (2020)

== Awards ==
His novel Hidden Desires, Restless Travels was nominated for the EU Prize for Literature.
