= European Union Prize for Literature =

- Country: European Union
- Presented by: EUPL Consortium: European Writers' Council (EWC), Federation of European Publishers (FEP), European and International Booksellers Federation (EIBF)
- First award: 2009; 17 years ago
- Website: www.euprizeliterature.eu

The European Union Prize for Literature (EUPL), established in 2009, is a European Union literary award. Its aim is to recognise outstanding new literary talents from all over Europe, to promote the circulation and translation of literature amongst European countries, and to highlight the continent's creativity and diversity.

== About the Award ==
The EUPL is funded by the "Creative Europe" programme, the European Commission framework programme for support to the culture and audiovisual sectors. The prize is run by a group of associations made up of the European Writers' Council, the Federation of European Publishers, and the European and International Booksellers Federation, with support from the European Commission. The EUPL Consortium is responsible for the setting up of national juries and the practical organisation of the EUPL award ceremony. They support the laureates in their promotion across Europe and beyond, online and at bookshops and book fairs' events.

=== Initial format ===
Each year, national juries consisting of experts in fields of literature, publishing and bookselling are set up in a rotating third of the participating countries to the Creative Europe programme. After deciding on a shortlist of 2 to 5 books from their country's most promising writers, each jury selects its national winner. All participating countries are thus represented across cycles of three years, with the Prize awarding one winning book/author per country. The current list of participating countries include:

- The 28 Member States of the European Union (as of 2013)
- The 3 EEA countries: Iceland, Liechtenstein and Norway
- The candidate and potential candidate countries for accession to the EU: Albania, Bosnia and Herzegovina, Kosovo, Montenegro, North Macedonia, Serbia and Turkey.
- European Neighbourhood Policy countries: Armenia, Georgia, Moldova, Tunisia and Ukraine

=== Revised format ===
In 2022, the European Commission announced several changes in the prize's structure, indicating that from now, national organisations would make an initial selection of books, nominating one book each, and that a second round of selection conducted by a seven-member European jury would select one winner and five special mentions for the award.

In response to these changes, the European Writers' Council announced that they would withdraw participation in the prize, stating that the new format "does not promote multilingualism."

=== Prize ===
Each laureate of the EUPL receives €5,000, and their awarded book is given support for translation, as well as promotion. An EUPL anthology is also published every year, with excerpts from all laureates' awarded books both in the original language and in an English or French translation.

== Winners ==
=== 2009 ===
Winners for 2009 were announced in November 2009.

- (Austria) : Paulus Hochgatterer, Die Süße des Lebens
- (Croatia) : Mila Pavićević, Djevojčica od leda i druge bajke
- (France) : Emmanuelle Pagano, Les Adolescents troglodytes
- (Hungary) : Noémi Szécsi, Kommunista Monte Cristo
- (Republic of Ireland) : Karen Gillece, Longshore Drift
- (Italy) : Daniele Del Giudice, Orizzonte mobile
- (Lithuania) : Laura Sintija Černiauskaitė, Kvėpavimas į marmurą
- (Norway) : Carl Frode Tiller, Innsirkling
- (Poland) : Jacek Dukaj, Lód
- (Portugal) : Dulce Maria Cardoso, Os Meus Sentimentos
- (Slovakia) : Pavol Rankov, Stalo sa prvého septembra (alebo inokedy)
- (Sweden) : Helena Henschen, I skuggan av ett brott

=== 2010 ===
Winners for 2010 were announced on 18 November 2010.

- (Belgium) : Peter Terrin, De bewaker
- (Cyprus) : Myrto Azina Chronides (Μυρτώ Αζίνα Χρονίδη), Το πείραμα (To Peírama)
- (Denmark) : Adda Djørup, Den mindste modstand
- (Estonia) : Tiit Aleksejev, Palveränd
- (Finland) : Riku Korhonen, Lääkäriromaani
- (Germany) : Iris Hanika, Das Eigentliche
- (Luxembourg) : Jean Back, Amateur
- (Romania) : Răzvan Rădulescu, Teodosie cel Mic
- (Slovenia) : Nataša Kramberger, Nebesa v robidah: roman v zgodbah
- (Spain) : Raquel Martínez-Gómez, Sombras de unicornio
- (North Macedonia) : Goce Smilevski (Гоце Смилевски), Сестрата на Зигмунд Фројд

=== 2011 ===
Winners for 2011 were announced on 11 October 2011.

- (Bulgaria) : Kalin Terziyski (Калин Терзийски), Има ли кой да ви обича (Ima li koj da vi običa)
- (Czech Republic) : Tomáš Zmeškal, Milostný dopis klínovým písmem
- (Greece) : Kostas Hatziantoniou (Κώστας Χατζηαντωνίου), Αγκριτζέντο (Ankritzénto)
- (Iceland) : Ófeigur Sigurðsson, Jón
- (Latvia) : Inga Žolude, Mierinājums Ādama kokam
- (Liechtenstein) : Iren Nigg, Man wortet sich die Orte selbst
- (Malta) : Immanuel Mifsud, Fl-Isem tal-Missier (u tal-Iben)
- (Montenegro) : Andrej Nikolaidis, Sin
- (Netherlands) : Rodaan Al Galidi, De autist en de postduif
- (Serbia) : Jelena Lengold, Vašarski mađioničar
- (Turkey) : Çiler İlhan, Sürgün
- (United Kingdom) : Adam Foulds, The Quickening Maze

=== 2012 ===
The EUPL Award Ceremony was hosted in Brussels on 22 October 2012.

- (Austria) : Anna Kim, Die gefrorene Zeit
- (Croatia) : Lada Žigo, Rulet
- (France) : Laurence Plazenet, L’amour seul
- (Hungary) : Viktor Horváth, Török tükör
- (Republic of Ireland) : Kevin Barry, City of Bohane
- (Italy) : Emanuele Trevi, Qualcosa di scritto
- (Lithuania) : Giedra Radvilavičiūtė, Šiąnakt aš miegosiu prie sienos
- (Norway) : Gunstein Bakke, Maud og Aud. Ein roman om trafikk
- (Poland) : Piotr Paziński, Pensjonat
- (Portugal) : Afonso Cruz, A Boneca de Kokoschka
- (Slovakia) : Jana Beňová, Café Hyena: Plán odprevádzania
- (Sweden) : Sara Mannheimer, Handlingen

=== 2013 ===
The winners were announced on 26 September 2013. The ceremony was hosted in Brussels on 26 November 2013.

- (Belgium) : Isabelle Wéry, Marilyn désossée
- (Bosnia and Herzegovina) : Faruk Šehić, Knjiga o Uni
- (Cyprus) : Emilios Solomou (Αιμίλιος Σολωμού), Hμερολóγιο μιας απιστίας (Emerológio mias apistías)
- (Denmark) : Kristian Bang Foss, Døden kører Audi
- (Estonia) : Meelis Friedenthal, Mesilased
- (Finland) : Katri Lipson, Jäätelökauppias
- (Germany) : Marica Bodrožić, Kirschholz und alte Gefühle
- (Luxembourg) : Tullio Forgiarini, Amok: Eng Lëtzebuerger Liebeschronik
- (North Macedonia) : Lidija Dimkovska (Лидија Димковска), Резервен живот (Rezerven život)
- (Romania) : Ioana Pârvulescu, Viața începe vineri
- (Slovenia) : Gabriela Babnik, Sušna doba
- (Spain) : Cristian Crusat, Breve teoría del viaje y el desierto

=== 2014 ===
The winners were announced on 8 October 2014 at the Frankfurt Book Fair.

- (Albania) : Ben Blushi, Otello, Arapi i Vlorës
- (Bulgaria) : Milen Ruskov (Милен Русков), Възвишение (Vǎzvišenie)
- (Czech Republic) : Jan Němec, Dějiny světla
- (Greece) : Makis Tsitas (Μάκης Τσίτας), Μάρτυς μου ο Θεός (Mártis mou o Theós)
- (Iceland) : Oddný Eir, Jarðnæði
- (Latvia) : Jānis Joņevs, Jelgava 94
- (Liechtenstein) : Armin Öhri, Die dunkle Muse: Historischer Kriminalroman
- (Malta) : Pierre J. Mejlak, Dak li l-Lejl Iħallik Tgħid
- (Montenegro) : Ognjen Spahić, Puna glava radosti
- (Netherlands) : Marente de Moor, De Nederlandse maagd
- (Serbia) : Uglješa Šajtinac (Угљеша Шајтинац), Сасвим скромни дарови (Sasvim skromni darovi)
- (Turkey) : Birgül Oğuz, Hah
- (United Kingdom) : Evie Wyld, All the Birds, Singing

=== 2015 ===
The winners were announced in April 2015, at the opening ceremony of the London Book Fair by Tibor Navracsics, the European Commissioner for Education, Culture, Youth and Sport at the time.

- (Austria) : Carolina Schutti, Einmal muss ich über weiches Gras gelaufen sein
- (Croatia) : Luka Bekavac, Viljevo
- (France) : Gaëlle Josse, Le dernier gardien d’Ellis Island
- (Hungary) : Edina Szvoren, Nincs, és ne is legyen
- (Republic of Ireland) : Donal Ryan, The Spinning Heart
- (Italy) : Lorenzo Amurri, Apnea
- (Lithuania) : Undinė Radzevičiūtė, Žuvys ir drakonai
- (Norway) : Ida Hegazi Høyer, Unnskyld
- (Poland) : Magdalena Parys, Magik
- (Portugal) : David Machado, Índice médio de felicidade
- (Slovakia) : Svetlana Žuchová, Obrazy zo života M.
- (Sweden) : Sara Stridsberg, Beckomberga: ode till min familj

=== 2016 ===
The winners were announced in April 2016 at the European Commission.

- (Belgium) : Christophe Van Gerrewey, Op de Hoogte
- (Bosnia and Herzegovina) : Tanja Stupar-Trifunović (Тања Ступар Трифуновић), Сатови у мајчиној соби (Satovi u majčinoj sobi)
- (Cyprus) : Antonis Georgiou (Αντώνης Γεωργίου), Ένα άλπουμ ιστορίες (Éna álpoum istoríes)
- (Denmark) : Bjørn Rasmussen, Huden er det elastiske hylster der omgiver hele legemet
- (Estonia) : Paavo Matsin, Gogoli disko
- (Finland) : Selja Ahava, Taivaalta tippuvat asiat
- (Germany) : Benedict Wells, Vom Ende der Einsamkeit
- (Luxembourg) : Gast Groeber, All Dag verstoppt en aneren
- (Romania) : Claudiu M. Florian, Vârstele jocului. Strada Cetății.
- (Slovenia) : Jasmin B. Frelih, Na/pol
- (Spain) : Jesús Carrasco, La tierra que pisamos
- (North Macedonia) : Nenad Joldeski (Ненад Јолдески), Секој со своето езеро (Sekoj so svoeto ezero)

=== 2017 ===
The winners were announced on 21 April 2017.

- (Albania) : Rudi Erëbara, Epika e yjeve të mëngjesit
- (Bulgaria) : Ina Vultchanova (Ина Вълчанова), Остров Крах (Ostrov Krah)
- (Czech Republic) : Bianca Bellová, Jezero
- (Greece) : Kallia Papadaki (Κάλλια Παπαδάκη), Δενδρίτες (Dendrítes)
- (Iceland) : Halldóra K. Thoroddsen, Tvöfalt gler
- (Latvia) : Osvalds Zebris, Gaiļu kalna ēnā
- (Malta) : Walid Nabhan, L-Eżodu taċ-Ċikonji
- (Montenegro) : Aleksandar Bečanović, Arcueil
- (Netherlands) : Jamal Ouariachi, Een honger
- (Serbia) : Darko Tuševljaković, Jaz
- (Turkey) : Sine Ergün, Baştankara
- (United Kingdom) : Sunjeev Sahota, The Year of the Runaways

=== 2018 ===
In 2018, the European Union Prize for Literature (EUPL) celebrated its 10th anniversary. To mark this special occasion, the EUPL organised a writing contest exclusively open to all previous 108 EUPL winners. The EUPL Anniversary Edition (a short fiction competition) celebrated 5 winners:

- (Luxembourg) : Jean Back, Europäesch Wolleken
- (North Macedonia) : Lidija Dimkovska (Лидија Димковска), Кога заминав од „Карл Либкнехт“ (Koga zaminav od „Karl Liebknecht“)
- (Luxembourg) : Gast Groeber, Aktuelle Wetterwarnung: überwiegend dichter Nebel
- (Serbia) : Jelena Lengold, Jasmin i smrt
- (Romania) : Ioana Pârvulescu, O voce

=== 2019 ===
The winners were announced on 24 May 2019.

- (Austria) : Laura Freudenthaler, Geistergeschichte
- (Finland) : Piia Leino, Taivas
- (France) : Sophie Daull, Au grand lavoir
- (Hungary) : Réka Mán-Várhegyi, Mágneshegy
- (Georgia (country)) : Beqa Adamashvili (ბექა ადამაშვილი), ამ რომანში ყველა კვდება (Am romanshi q’vela k’vdeba)
- (Greece) : Nikos Chryssos (Νίκος Χρυσός), Καινούργια μέρα (Kainourgia mera)
- (Northern Ireland) : Jan Carson, The Firestarters
- (Italy) : Giovanni Dozzini, E Baboucar guidava la fila
- (Lithuania) : Daina Opolskaitė, Dienų piramidės
- (Poland) : Marta Dzido, Frajda
- (Romania) : Tatiana Țîbuleac, Grădina de sticlă
- (Slovakia) : Ivana Dobrakovová, Matky a kamionisti
- (Ukraine) : Haska Shyyan (Гаська Шиян), За спиною (Za spynoju)
- (United Kingdom) : Melissa Harrison, All Among the Barley

=== 2020 ===
The winners were announced on 19 May 2020.

- (Belgium) : Nathalie Skowronek, La carte des regrets
- (Bosnia and Herzegovina) : Lana Bastašić, Uhvati zeca
- (Croatia) : Maša Kolanović, Poštovani kukci i druge jezive priče
- (Cyprus) : Stavros Christodoulou (Σταύρος Χριστοδούλου), Τη μέρα που πάγωσε ο ποταμός (Te méra pou págose o potamós)
- (Denmark) : Asta Olivia Nordenhof, Penge på lommen
- (Estonia) : Mudlum, Poola poisid
- (Germany) : Matthias Nawrat, Der traurige Gast
- (Kosovo) : Shpëtim Selmani, Libërthi i dashurisë
- (Luxembourg) : Francis Kirps, Die Mutationen
- (Montenegro) : Stefan Bošković, Ministar
- (North Macedonia) : Petar Andonovski (Петар Андоновски), Страв од варвари (Strav od varvari)
- (Norway) : Maria Navarro Skaranger, Bok om sorg
- (Spain) : Irene Solà, Canto jo i la muntanya balla

=== 2021 ===
The winners were announced on 18 May 2021.

- (Albania) : Tom Kuka, Flama
- (Armenia) : Aram Pachyan (Արամ Պաչյան), P/F
- (Bulgaria) : Georgi Bardarov (Георги Бърдаров), Absolvo te
- (Czech Republic) : Lucie Faulerová, Smrtholka
- (Iceland) : Sigrún Pálsdóttir, Delluferðin
- (Latvia) : Laura Vinogradova, Upe
- (Malta) : Lara Calleja, Kissirtu kullimkien
- (Netherlands) : Gerda Blees, Wij zijn licht
- (Portugal) : Frederico Pedreira, A Lição do Sonâmbulo
- (Serbia) : Dejan Tiago Stanković, Zamalek
- (Slovenia) : Anja Mugerli, Čebelja družina
- (Sweden) : Maxim Grigoriev, Europa
- (Tunisia) : Amine Al Ghozzi (أمين الغزي), زندالي ليلة 14 جانفي 2011 (Zindali laylat 14 janfi 2011)

=== 2022 ===
The 2022 edition introduced a change in the organisation of the Prize. For the first time, a seven-member European jury awarded one overall winner for this edition, accompanied by five special mentions.

Winner:

- (Georgia (country)) : Iva Pezuashvili (ივა ფეზუაშვილი), ბუნკერი (bunk’eri)

Special mentions:

- (Belgium) : Gaea Schoeters, Trofee
- (Bosnia and Herzegovina) : Slađana Nina Perković, U jarku
- (Republic of Ireland) : Tadhg Mac Dhonnagáin, Madame Lazare
- (Spain) : Jacobo Bergareche, Los días perfectos
- (Ukraine) : Yevhenia Kuznietsova (Євгенія Кузнєцова), Спитайте Мієчку (Spytajte Miječku)

Also nominated:

- (Italy) : Daniele Mencarelli, Sempre tornare
- (Norway) : Kjersti Anfinnsen, Øyeblikk for evigheten
- (Austria) : Peter Karoshi, Zu den Elefanten
- (Romania) : Raluca Nagy, Teo de la 16 la 18
- (Slovakia) : Richard Pupala, Ženy aj muži, zvieratá
- (Greece) : Takis Kampylis (Τάκης Καμπύλης), Γενικά συμπτώματα (Geniká symptómata)
- (Lithuania) : Tomas Vaiseta, Ch.
- (North Macedonia) : Vladimir Jankovski (Владимир Јанковски), Скриени желби, немирни патувања (Skrieni želbi, nemirni patuvanja)

=== 2023 ===
Winner:

- (Croatia) : Martina Vidaić, Stjenice

Special mentions:

- (Cyprus) : Hari N. Spanou (Χάρη Ν. Σπανού), Φυλάκιο (Fylákio)
- (Estonia) : Tõnis Tootsen, Ahvide pasteet. Ühe ahvi mälestusi ja mõtteid
- (Finland) : Iida Rauma, Hävitys
- (France) : Maud Simonnot, L’heure des oiseaux
- (Kosovo) : Ag Apolloni, Kësulëkuqja, përrallë për të rritur

Also nominated:

- (Liechtenstein) : Anna Ospelt, Frühe Pflanzung
- (Montenegro) : Ilija Đurović, Sampas
- (Luxembourg) : Jeff Schinker, Ma vie sous les tentes
- (Armenia) : Lusine Kharatyan (Լուսինե Խառատյան), Սիրիավեպ (Siriavep)
- (Sweden) : Marit Kapla, Kärlek på svenska
- (Czech Republic) : Ondřej Štindl, Tolik popela
- (Poland) : Sabina Jakubowska, Akuszerki

=== 2024 ===
Winner:

- (Denmark) : Theis Ørntoft, Jordisk

Special mentions:

- (Germany) : Deniz Utlu, Vaters Meer
- (Iceland) : María Elísabet Bragadóttir, Sápufuglinn
- (Netherlands) : Sholeh Rezazadeh, Ik ken een berg die op me wacht
- (Slovenia) : Tina Vrščaj, Na klancu
- (Bulgaria) : Todor P. Todorov (Тодор П. Тодоров), Хагабула (Hagabula)

Also nominated:

- (Malta) : Aleks Farrugia, Ir-Re Borg
- (Tunisia) : Arbia Braham (عربية إبراهم), جبل الملح (Jabal al-Milh)
- (Serbia) : Bojan Krivokapić, Vila Fazanka
- (Latvia) : Daina Tabūna, Raganas
- (Portugal) : Gabriela Ruivo, Lei da gravidade
- (Hungary) : Panni Puskás, Megmenteni bárkit
- (Albania) : Rita Petro, Lindur së prapthi

=== 2025 ===
Winner:

- (Italy) : Nicoletta Verna, I giorni di Vetro

Special mentions:

- (Belgium) : Philippe Marczewski, Quand Cécile
- (Republic of Ireland) : Sheila Armstrong, Falling Animals

Also nominated:

- (Georgia (country)) : Tea Topuria (თეა თოფურია), იაკობის ჭასთან (Iak’obis Ch’astan)
- (Norway) : Maria Kjos Fonn, Margaret, er du i sorg
- (Greece) : Makis Malafekas (Μάκης Μαλαφέκας), Deepfake
- (Slovakia) : Lukáš Cabala, Spomenieš si na Trenčín?
- (Austria) : Ljuba Arnautović, Erste Töchter
- (Lithuania) : Kotryna Zylė, Mylimi kaulai
- (Ukraine) : Halyna Matveeva (Галина Матвєєва), Ключ соль (Kliuč sol')
- (Spain) : David Uclés, La península de las casas vacías
- (Romania) : Bogdan Crețu, Mai puțin decât dragostea
- (Bosnia and Herzegovina) : Mihaela Šumić, Čovjek vuk

== Translations ==
The European Union promotes the transnational circulation of literature and its diversity in Europe and beyond. The list below shows a sample of the list of EUPL awarded books available in an English translation:

- (Finland) Selja Ahava, Things that fall from the sky, Oneworld Publications, 2015
- (North Macedonia) Petar Andonovski, Fear of Barbarians, Parthian Books, 2021
- (Slovenia) Gabriela Babnik, Dry Season, Istros Books, 2012
- (Bosnia and Herzegovina) Lana Bastašić, Catch the Rabbit, Picador, 2021
- (Czech Republic) Bianca Bellová, The Lake, Parthian Books, 2022
- (Slovakia) Jana Beňová, Seeing People Off, Two Dollar Radio, 2017
- (Portugal) Dulce Maria Cardoso, Violeta Among the Stars, MacLehose Press, 2020
- (Lithuania) Laura Sintija Cerniauskaité, Breathing into Marble, Noir Press, 2017
- (Cyprus) Myrto Azina Chronides, The Experiment, Garnet Pub Ltd, 2012
- (Spain) Cristian Crusat, A Brief Theory of Travel and the Desert, Hispabooks Pub, 2016
- (Portugal) Afonso Cruz, Kokoschka's Doll, MacLehose Press, 2020
- (North Macedonia) Lidija Dimkovska, A Spare Life, Two Lines Press, 2016
- (Iceland) Oddný Eir, Land of Love and Ruins, Restless Books, 2016
- (Slovenia) Jasmin B. Frelih, In/Half, Oneworld Pubns, 2018
- (Germany) Iris Hanika, The Bureau of Past Management, V&Q Books, 2021
- (Austria) Paulus Hochgatterer, The Sweetness of Life, MacLehose Press, 2006
- (Turkey) Çiler İlhan, Exile, Istros Books, 2015
- (Latvia) Jānis Joņevs, Doom 94, Wrecking Ball Press, 2018
- (France) Gaëlle Josse, The Last Days of Ellis Island, World Edtns Llc, 2020
- (Austria) Anna Kim, Frozen Time, Ariadne Press, 2008
- (Serbia) Jelena Lengold, Fairground Magician, Istros Books, 2013
- (Finland) Katri Lipson, The Ice Cream Man, Amazon Crossing, 2012
- (Portugal) David Machado, The Shelf Life of Happiness, Amazon Crossing, 2016
- (Estonia) Paavo Matsin, The Gogol Disco, Dalkey Archive Press, 2020
- (Malta) Immanuel Mifsud, In the Name of the Father (and of the Son), Parthian Books, 2019
- (Netherlands) Marente de Moor, The Dutch Maiden, World Editions International, 2016
- (Montenegro) Andrej Nikolaidis, The Son, Istros Books, 2013
- (Turkey) Birgül Oğuz, Hah, World Editions International, 2016
- (France) Emmanuelle Pagano, One Day I’ll Tell You Everything, Text Publishing, 2020
- (Romania) Ioana Pârvulescu, Life Begins on Friday, Istros Books, 2016
- (Poland) Piotr Paziński, The Boarding House, Dalkey Archive, 2018
- (Bosnia and Herzegovina) Faruk Šehić, Quiet Flows the Una, Istros Books, 2016
- (Spain) Irene Solà, When I Sing, Mountains Dance, Graywolf Press, 2022
- (North Macedonia) Goce Smilevski, Freud's Sister, Penguin Books, 2012
- (Montenegro) Ognjen Spahić, A Head Full of Joy, Dalkey Archive Press, 2018
- (Belgium) Peter Terrin, The Guard, MacLehose Press, 2012
- (Norway) Carl Frode Tiller, Encircling, Graywolf Press, 2017
- (Italy) Emanuele Trevi, Something written, World Editions International, 2016
- (Greece) Makis Tsitas, God Is My Witness, Aiora Books, 2019
- (Germany) Benedict Wells, The End of Loneliness, Sceptre, 2018
- (Czech Republic) Tomáš Zmeškal, Love Letter in Cuneiform, Yale University Press, 2008
