= Frederico Pedreira =

Portuguese writer

Frederico Pedreira (born 1983) is a Portuguese writer. He studied in Portugal and the UK, where he pursued a master’s degree at Royal Holloway, University of London. He completed a PhD in literary theory at the University of Lisbon; the book based on his dissertation won the 2016 INCM/Vasco Graça Moura Prize for best essay in the humanities. Pedreira has worked in a range of professions, e.g. journalist, translator and bookseller. He has also lived in Italy and France.

As a writer, he has published around 10 books, including six collections of poetry, two novels, a book of short stories and a collection of essays. In 2021, he won the EU Prize for Literature for his book A LIÇÃO DO SONÂMBULO (The Sleepwalker Lesson). As a translator, he has translated the works of Yeats, Louise Glück, G. K. Chesterton, Orwell, and novels by Dickens, Swift, H. G. Wells, Hardy, John Banville and Virginia Woolf.
