= Bjørn Rasmussen (writer) =

Danish poet and writer

Bjørn Rasmussen (born 1983) is a Danish poet and writer. His first novel Huden er det elastiske hylster der omgiver hele legemet (in English The skin is the elastic sheath that surrounds the entire body) appeared in 2011. A second novel Pynt (in English Decoration) followed in 2013. A key figure in contemporary Danish poetry, Rasmussen published his first poetry collection Ming in 2015.

He won the 2011 Montana Literary Award and the 2016 European Union Prize for Literature for his debut novel, which is set to be translated into a number of European languages.
