= Lada Žigo =

Croatian writer (born 1970)

Lada Žigo (born 1970) is a Croatian writer. She was born in Zagreb, lived in Split, Croatia and studied comparative literature and philosophy at the University of Zagreb.

Her first book People and News People (Ljudi i novinari) was published in 2007 and was shortlisted for two major literary prizes – Ksaver Šandor Gjalski and Kiklop. Her second novel Bitches (Babetine) appeared in 2009, followed by Roulette (Rulet) in 2010. Roulette won the EU Prize for Literature and it was translated into Italian for Mimesis edizioni. Žigo's latest book is Full Steam Ahead Into the European Union (Punom parom u Europsku uniju, 2020).

A member of the Croatian Writers' Association, Žigo lives and works in Zagreb.
