= David Machado =

Portuguese writer

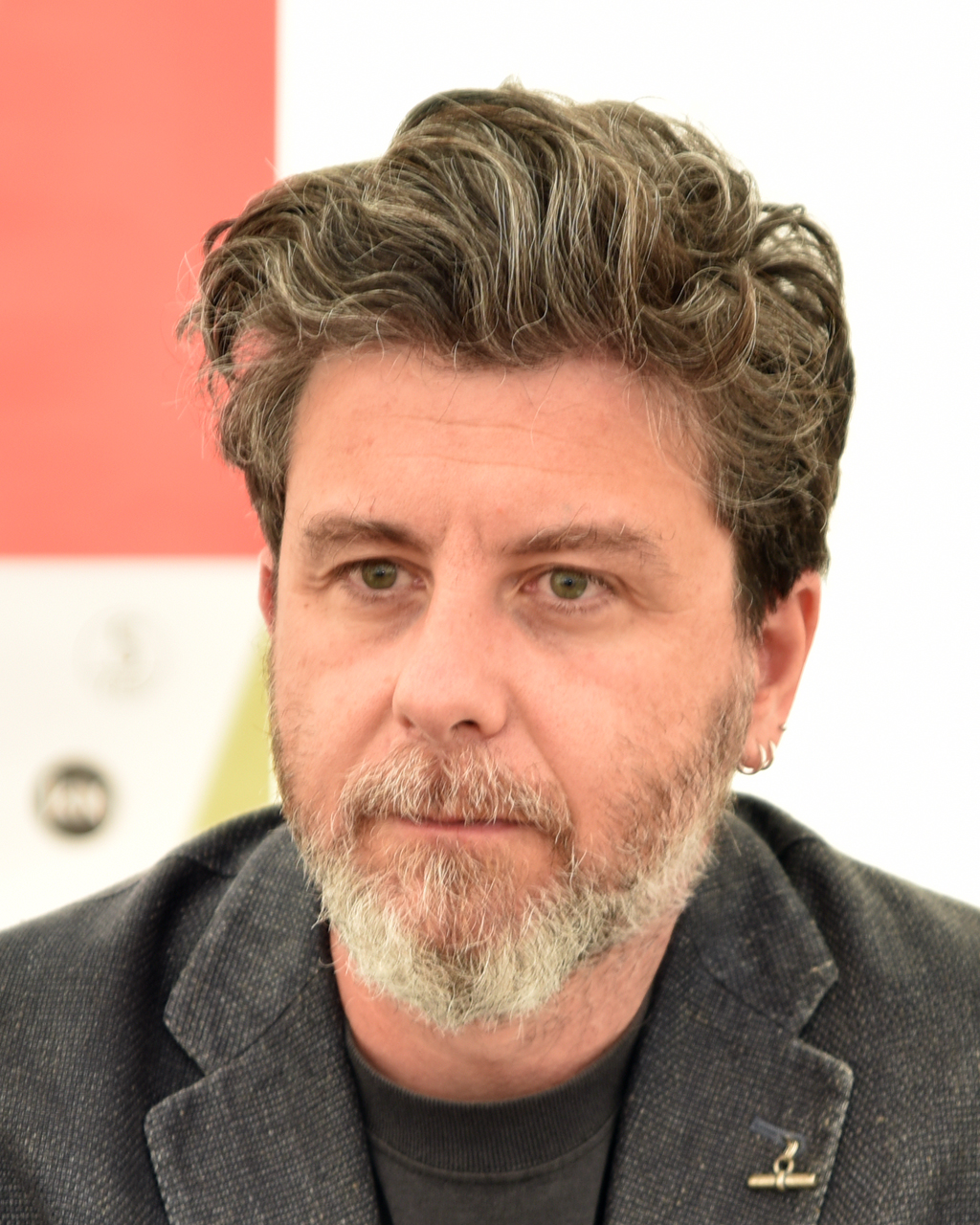
David Machado (2026)

David Machado (born 1978) is a Portuguese writer. He was born in Lisbon and studied economics at ISEG Lisbon, before turning to writing as a full-time occupation.

Machado first gained renown for his books for children, two of which won literary prizes. A Noite dos Animais Inventados won the Branquinho da Fonseca Prize in 2005, and O Tubarão na Banheira won the SPA/RTP Author Prize in 2010. In addition, he has published several novels and a short story collection titled Histórias Possíveis. In 2015, Machado won the EU Prize for Literature for his novel Indice Medio de Felicidade (Average Happiness Index).

== Selected works ==
Children's books

- A Noite dos Animais Inventados
- O Tubarão na Banheira
- Os Quatro Comandantes da Cama Voadora
- Um Homem Verde num Buraco Muito Fundo
- A Mala Assombrada
- Parece Um Pássaro
- Acho Que Posso Ajudar
- O meu cavalo Indomável

Short stories

- Histórias Possíveis

Novels

- O Fabuloso Teatro do Gigante
- Deixem Falar as Pedras
- Índice Médio de Felicidade
