= Kjersti Anfinnsen =

Norwegian writer (born 1975)

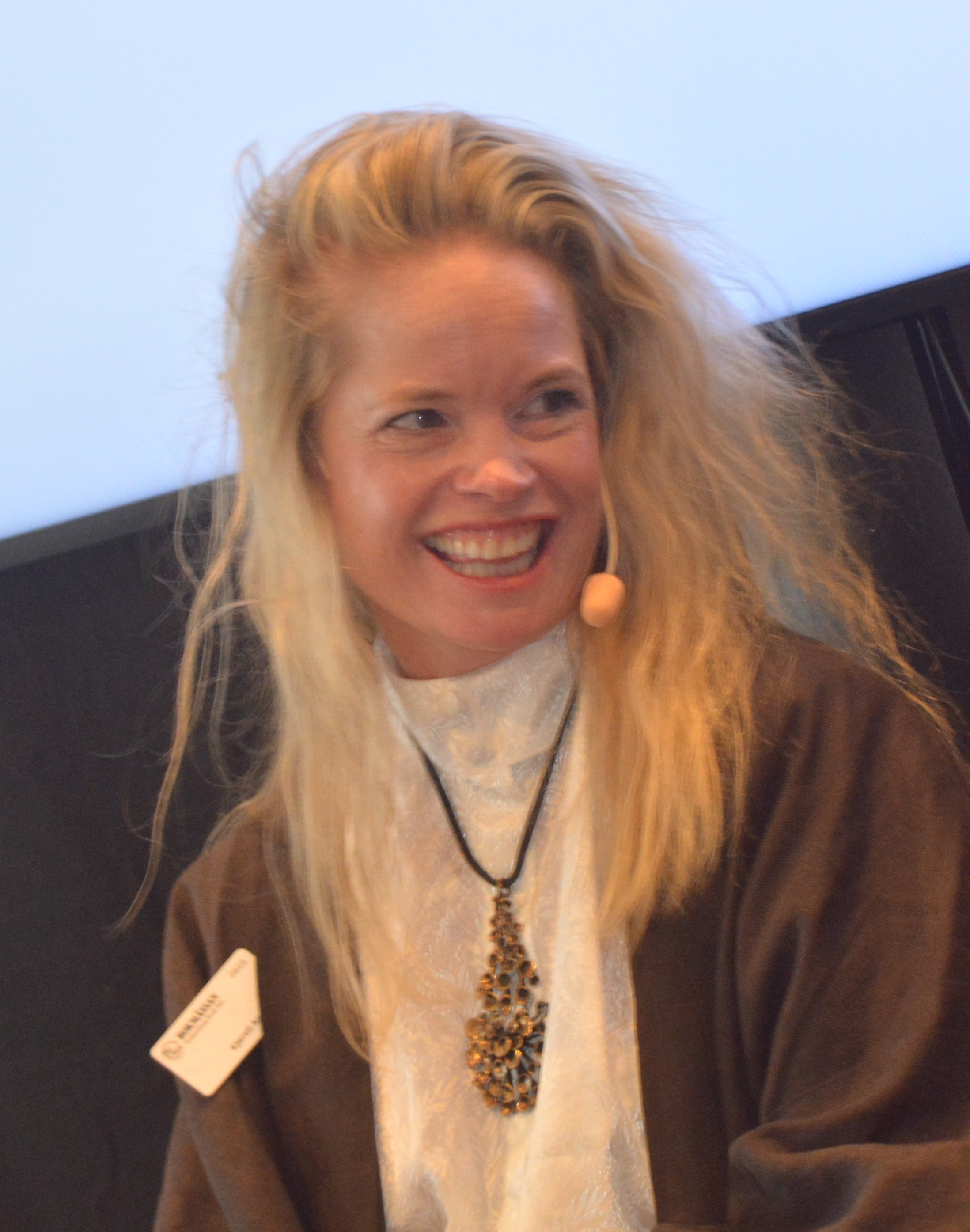
Kjersti Anfinnsen at Göteborg Book Fair, 2025

Kjersti Anfinnsen (born 1975) is a Norwegian novelist. A practising dentist, she also studied creative writing in Tromsø and Bergen. Her books have been translated into several European languages. She lives in Oslo.

== Selected works ==
- Det var grønt (It Was Green, 2012).
- De siste kjærtegn (The Last Signs of Love, 2019)
- Øyeblikk for evigheten (Moments for Eternity, 2021)

== Awards and honours ==
Moments for Eternity was nominated for the EU Prize for Literature.
