= Jamal Ouariachi =

Dutch writer

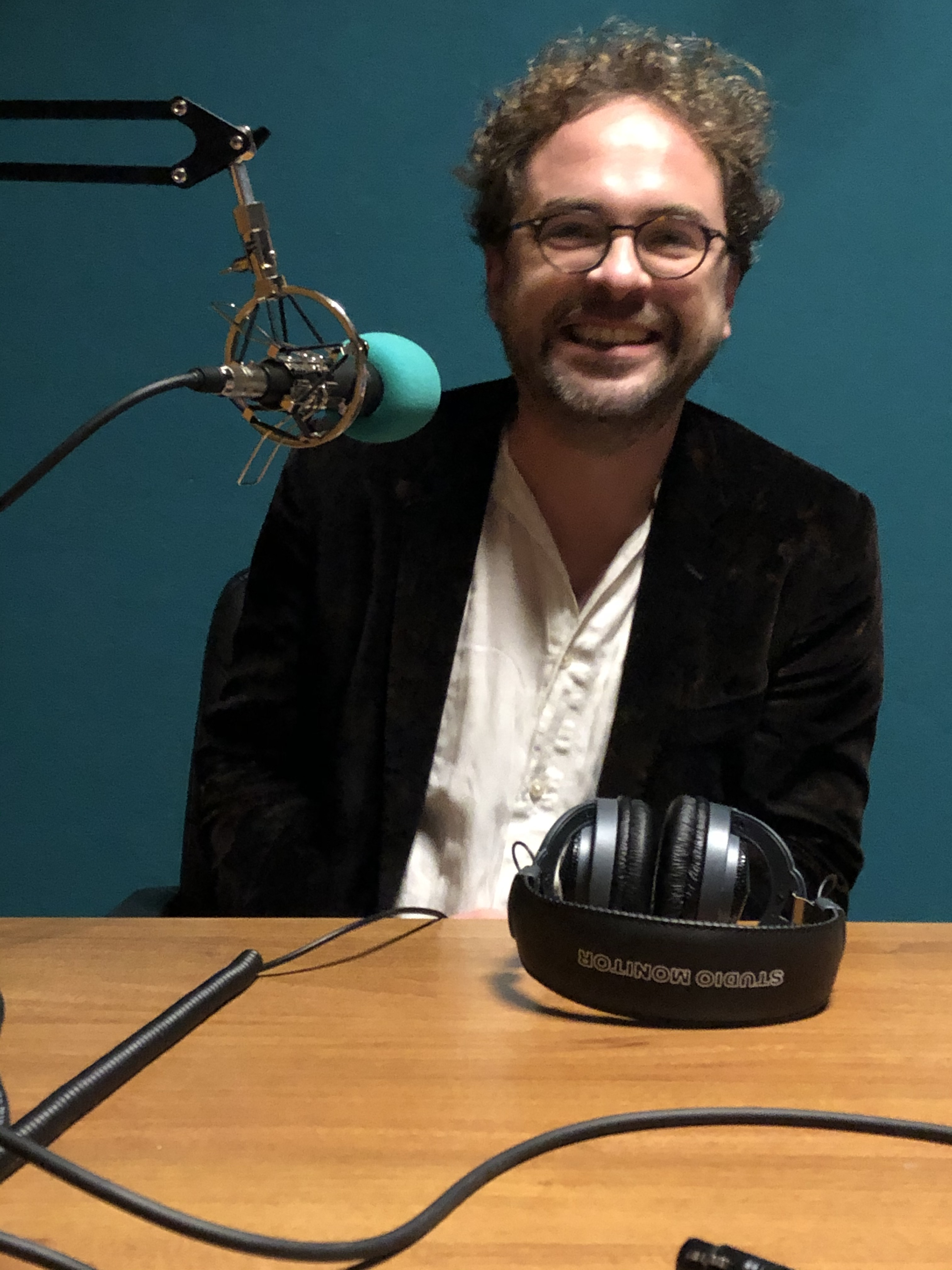
Jamal Ouariachi

Jamal Ouariachi (born 1978) is a Dutch writer. He was born in Amsterdam to a Dutch mother and a Moroccan father. He studied psychology at university and worked as an online therapist, before turning to writing full-time. His first novel The Destruction of Prosper Morèl appeared in 2010. His second novel Tenderness was nominated for the BNG Bank Literatuurprijs and the Gouden Uil. He contributed the first volume of 25-45-70, a trilogy written together with Daan Heerma van Voss and David Pefko. He won the EU Prize for Literature in 2017 with his novel A Hunger.
