= Giedra Radvilavičiūtė =

Lithuanian writer

Giedra Radvilavičiūtė (born 1960) is a Lithuanian writer. She was born in Panevėžys in northern Lithuania, and studied in Vilnius University, graduating in 1983 with a degree in Lithuanian language and literature. She taught for a few years in her native region, before returning to Vilnius to work as a journalist. She lived in the USA from 1994 to 1998; her husband Giedrius Subačius, a scholar of Lithuanian, was teaching in Chicago.

Radvilavičiūtė won the EU Prize for Literature for her short story collection Šiąnakt aš miegosiu prie sienos (Tonight I Shall Sleep by the Wall). She lives in Vilnius, where she works as an editor.
