= Piotr Paziński (writer) =

Polish writer (born 1973)

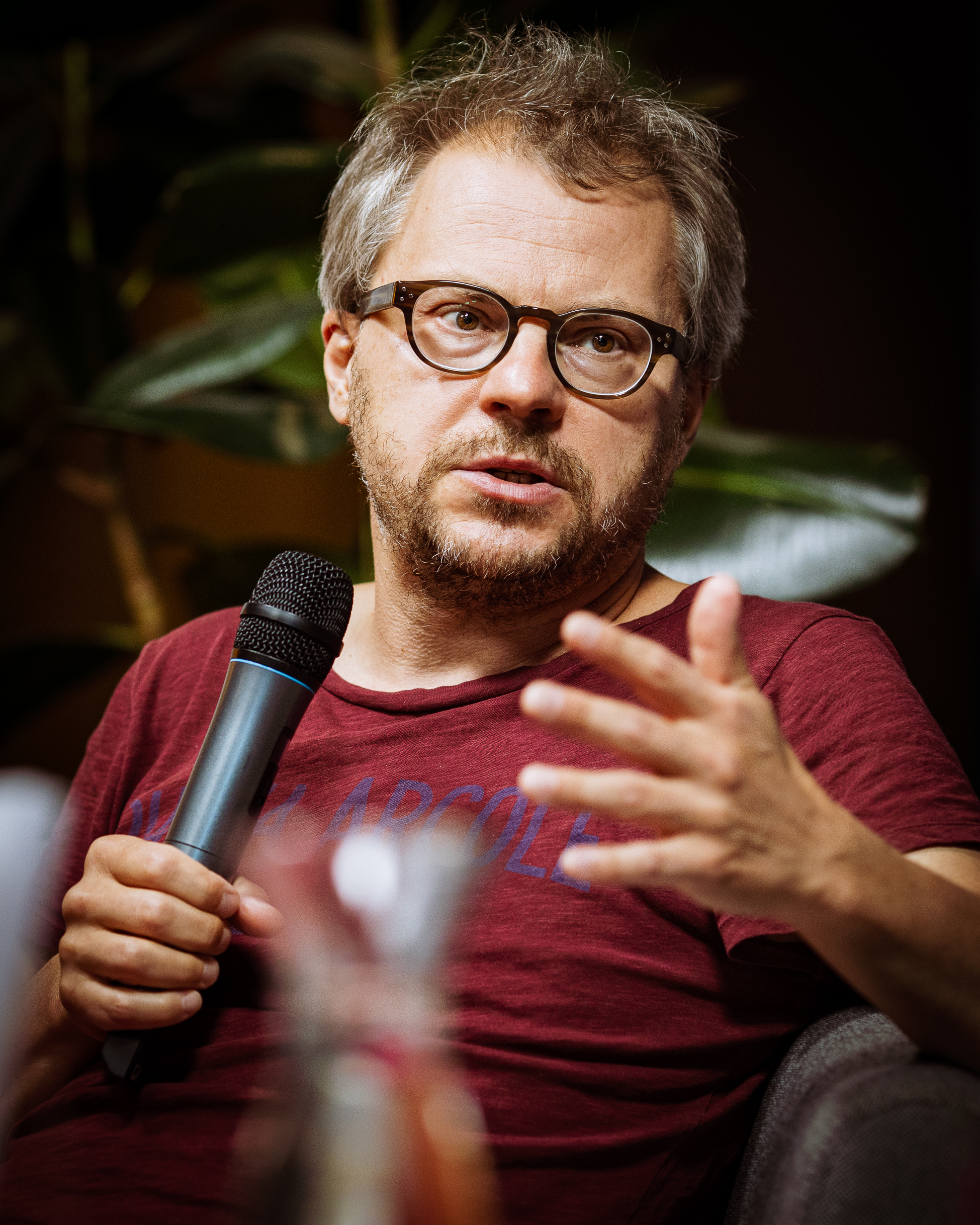
- Born: 9 July 1973
- Occupations: Writer, philosopher, journalist, essayist, literary historian, literary critic, translator
- Awards: European Union Prize for Literature (Boarding House, 2012)

Piotr Paziński (born 9 July 1973) is a Polish writer.

He has worked at the Warsaw-based Jewish magazine Midrash.

He has written two books on James Joyce and his fiction, and a novel Pensjonat (Boarding House, 2009), which won the Paszport Polityki award as well as the EU Prize for Literature. His 2013 book Bird Streets consists of four interconnected novellas, referring to the pre-World War II names, several still surviving today, of the Muranów or Northern District of central Warsaw where many Jews lived before the war. All four narrators feel bound to write down these stories, conveying a tone not only of wistfulness and reflection, but irony and gentle humor.

== Publications ==
- Labirynt i drzewo. Studia nad Ulissesem Jamesa Joyce'a. Kraków : Austeria, 2005
- with Jacek Marczewski (Photographer): Dublin z Ulissesem : wraz ze słownikiem bohaterów Ulissesa. Warszawa : Czuły Barbarzyńca, cop, 2008.
- Pensjonat. Warszawa : Wydawn. Nisza, 2009 (translated into English by Tusia Dabrowska as The Boarding House, 2018).
- Ptasie ulice. Warszawa : Wydawnictwo Nisza, 2013 (translated into English by Ursula Phillips as Bird Streets, 2022).
