= Slađana Nina Perković =

Writer (born 1981)

Sladjana Nina Perkovic
- In a 2024 interview
- Born: 1981 (age 44–45)
- Education: Paris 1 Panthéon-Sorbonne University
- Occupation: Writer

Sladjana Nina Perkovic (born 1981) is a French-Bosnian writer. She studied political science at the Paris 1 Panthéon-Sorbonne University, before pursuing a career as a journalist. As an author of fiction, she has published two books:

- Kuhanje (Cooking, short stories)
- U jarku (In the Ditch, novel).

U jarku has been nominated for multiple awards, among them the 2021 NIN Award, the Meša Selimović Prize and the EU Prize for Literature.

Perkovic divides her time between Paris and Banja Luka, Bosnia.
