= Iva Pezuashvili =

Georgian writer (born 1990)

Iva Pezuashvili (Diminutive for Ioane, variant of Georgian name Ivane, Georgian: ივა ფეზუაშვილი, 1990) is a Georgian writer. He was born in 1990, and studied film at the Shota Rustaveli Theatre and Film University. In 2018, he won a scholarship for the international writing program at the University of Iowa.

His 2012 film Babazi was based on his own short story "Alchu" ("Lucky Toss"). He was also a scriptwriter and director for the popular film series Tiflis.

Pezuashvili has been publishing his stories since 2012. His first collection I Tried appeared in 2014. One of his stories Tsa has been included in a couple of anthologies like The Book of Tbilisi and Georgien - Eine literarische Einladung. His debut novel Gospel of the Underground appeared in 2018, and was shortlisted for a number of Georgian literary awards. His latest work A garbage chute won the European Union Prize for Literature and the Tsinandali Award.
