= Réka Mán-Várhegyi =

Romanian-born Hungarian writer (born 1979)

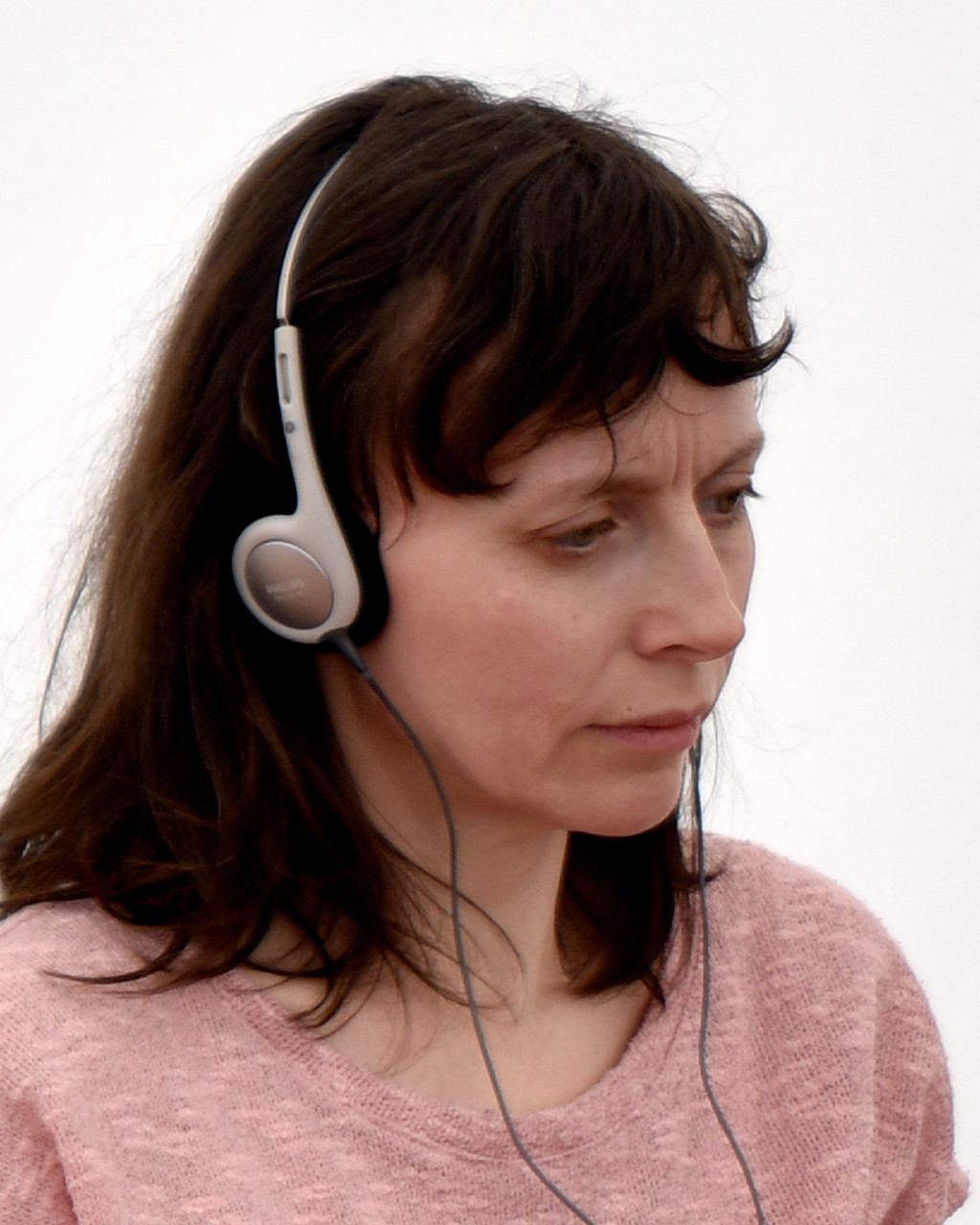
Réka Mán-Várhegyi (2024)

Réka Mán-Várhegyi (born 1979) is a Romanian-born Hungarian writer. She grew up in Târgu Mureș, Romania, before moving to Hungary. She became a Hungarian citizen in 1992.

Her first collection of short stories Unhappiness at the Aurora Housing Estate (Boldogtalanság az Auróra-telepen) came out in 2014. She has also written books for younger readers, both children and young adults. Her recent novel Magnetic Hill (Mágneshegy) won the EU Prize for Literature in 2019. She has also won a number of domestic literary awards.

Mán-Várhegyi lives in Budapest, where she works as a book editor.
