= Adda Djørup =

Danish poet and writer

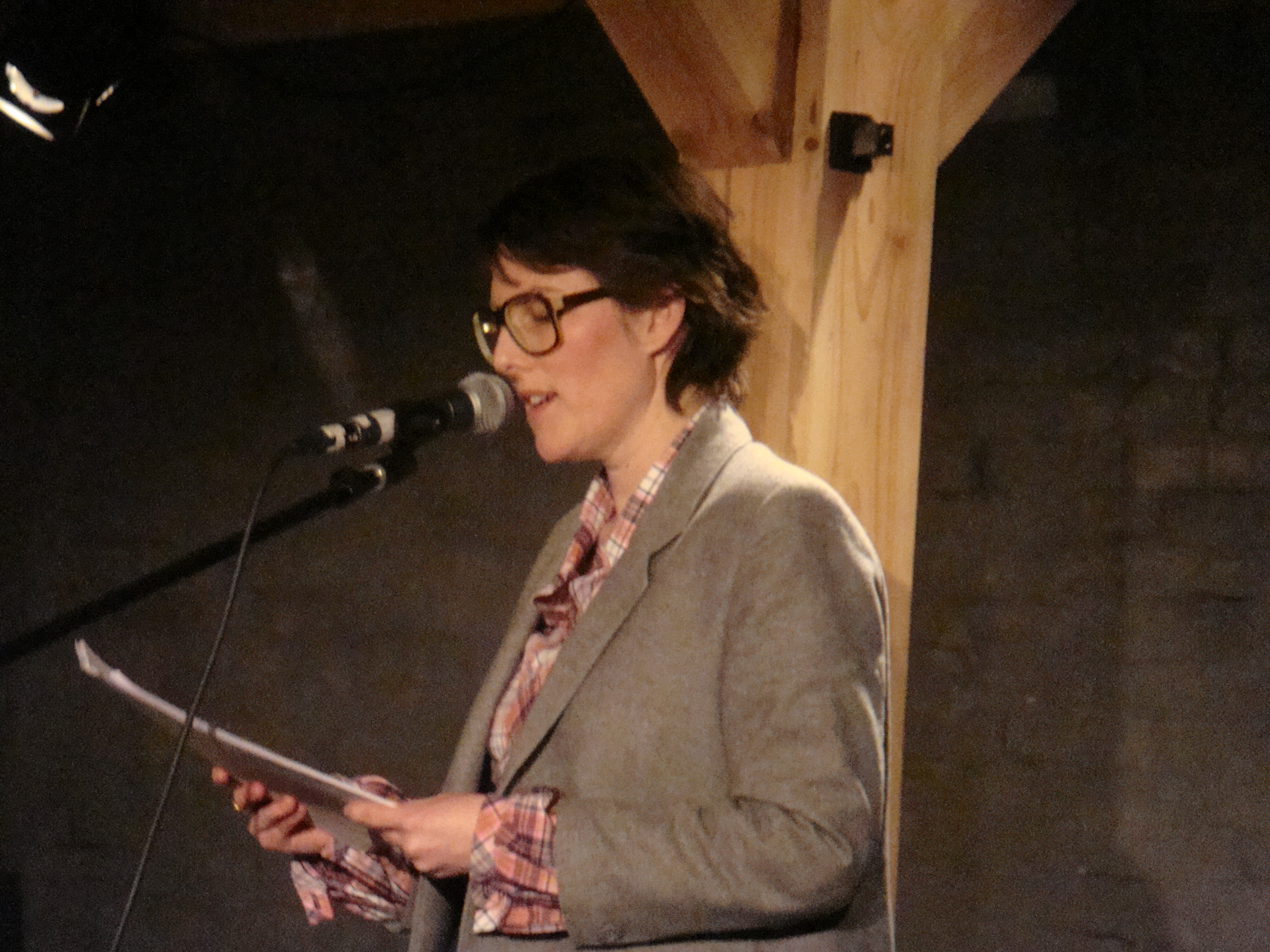
- Adda Djørup
- Born: August 18, 1972 (age 53) Aarhus, Denmark
- Occupation: Poet, novelist and short story writer
- Education: University of Copenhagen
- Notable awards: EU Prize for Literature (2010)

Adda Djørup (born August 18, 1972) is a Danish poet, novelist and short story writer.

== Early life and education ==
Djørup was born in Aarhus, Denmark. She went to the Katrinebjergskolen before dropping out and working for several years as an au pair, before returning for secondary school. She gained a Bachelor of Arts in Comparative Literature from the University of Copenhagen.

Djørup lives in Copenhagen.

== Career ==
Djørup's first book was Monsieurs monologer, a collection of poetry, appeared in 2005.

In 2007, she published a collection of short stories, titled Hvis man begyndte at spørge sig selv. Several of the stories in the collection were set in southern Europe. Djørup revealed that these were informed by her own extensive sojourn in Spain and Italy.

Djørup's novel Den mindste modstand (The least resistance, 2009) won the EU Prize for Literature in 2010.

In 2011, Djørup wrote a drama, titled Korus’ Kabaret.

In 2015, she released a poetry collection titled Poesi og andre former for trods.

== Awards ==
- 2010, EU Prize for Literature.
