= Magdalena Parys =

Polish writer and translator (born 1971)

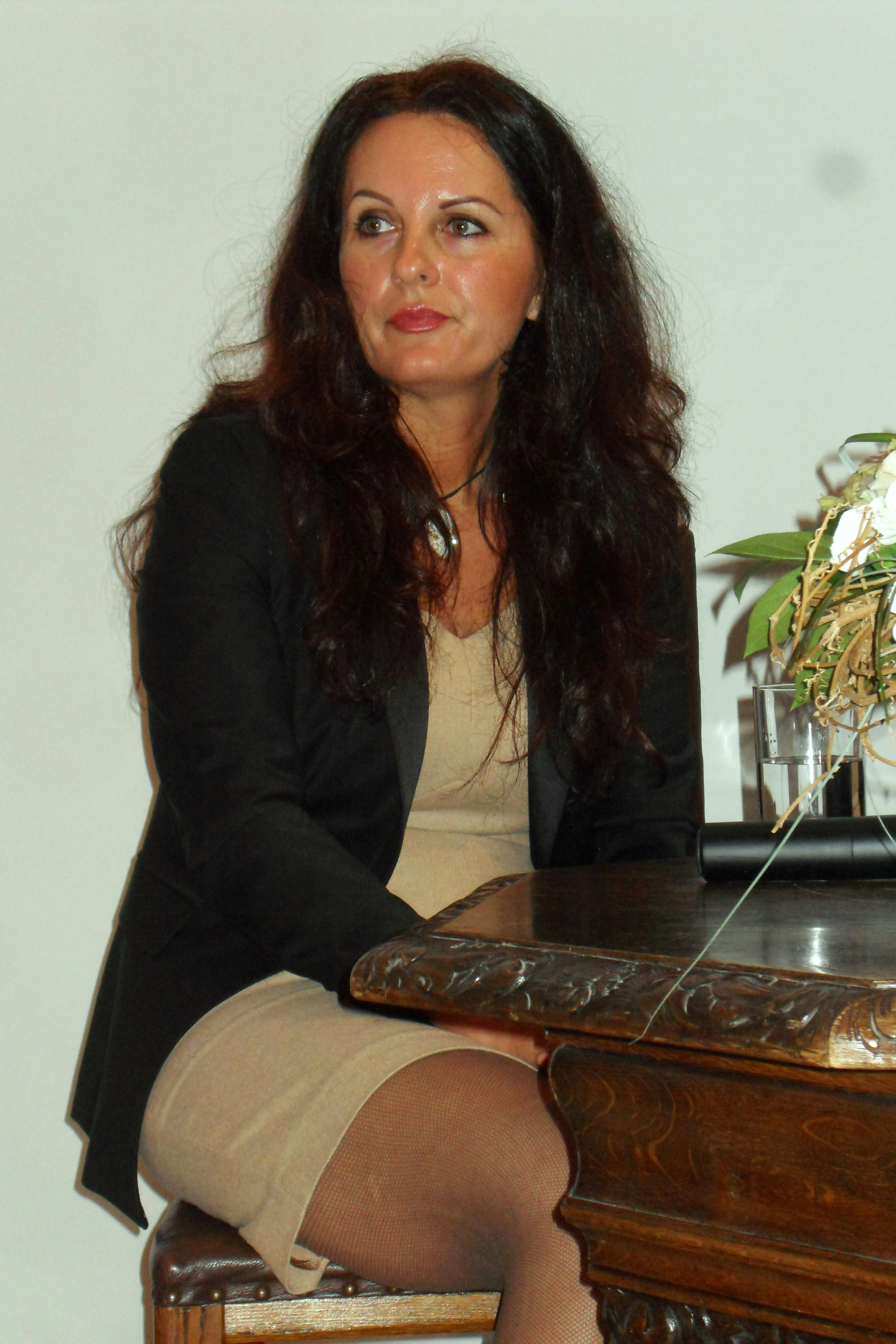
Magdalena Parys

Magdalena Parys (born 1971) is a Polish writer and translator. She studied at Humboldt University of Berlin. She has written several books, including Magik (2014) which won the European Union Prize for Literature in 2015.

== Early life and education ==
Parys was born in Gdańsk. In 1984 her family emigrated to West Berlin, where she has lived ever since. After German reunification she studied Polish philology and education at the Humboldt University of Berlin; she also took courses in archaeology.

== Works ==
- Tunel (Świat Książki, 2011)
- Magik (Świat Książki, 2014)
- Biała Rika (Znak Literanova, 2016)
- Książę (Agora, 2020)

=== Translations ===
- Tunnel (German), trans. Paulina Schulz, Prospero, 2014
- Der Magier (German), trans. Lothar Quinkenstein, freiraum-verlag, 2018
- Il mago (Italian), trans. Alessandro Amenta, Mimesis Edizioni, 2018
- A mágus (Hungarian), trans. Lajos Pálfalvi, L'Harmattan, 2020
- Le prince (French), trans. Caroline Raszka-Dewez, Agullo, 2023
