= Antonis Georgiou =

Cypriot lawyer and writer (born 1969)

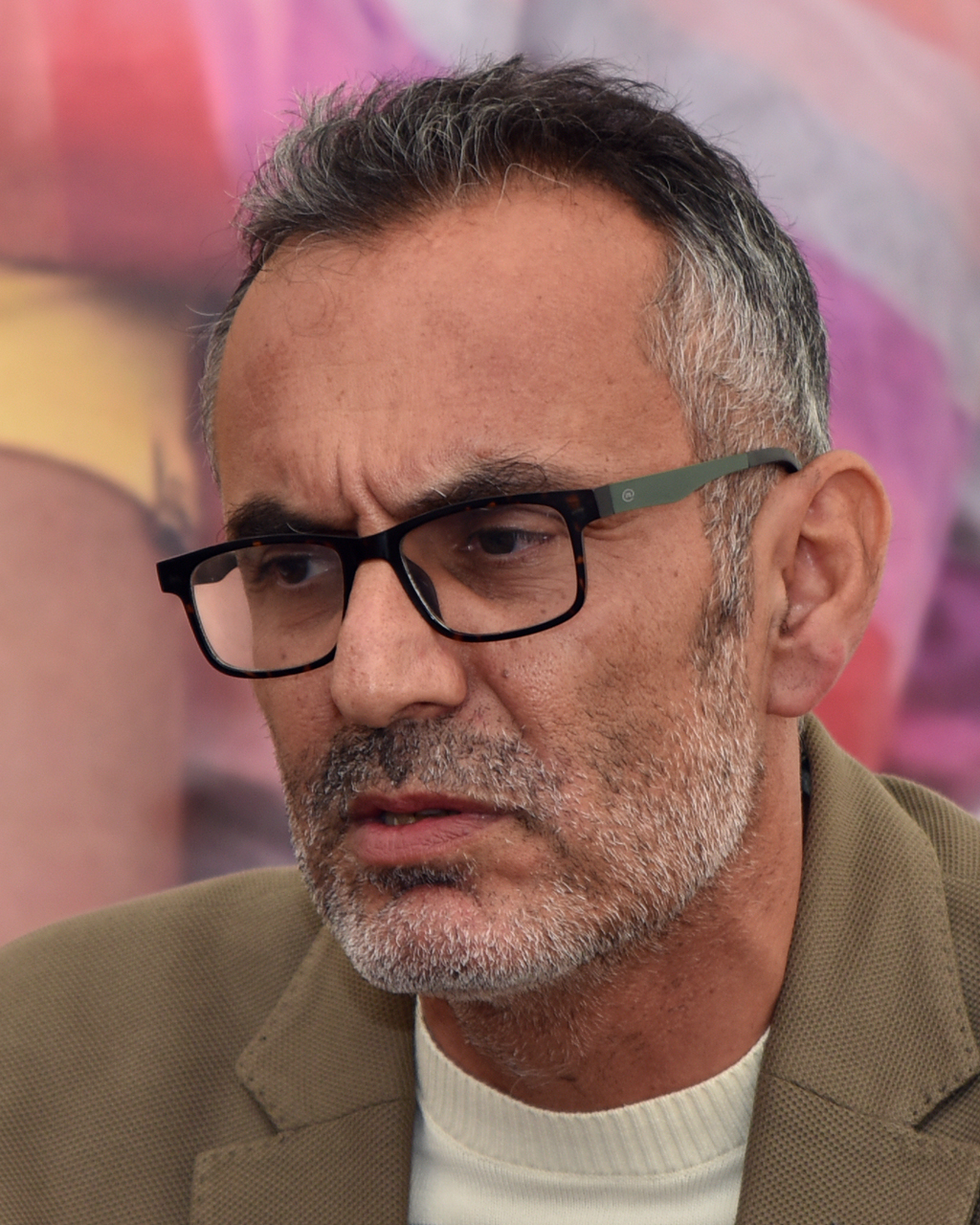
Antonis Georgiou (2022)

Antonis Georgiou (born 1969) is a Cypriot lawyer and writer. He was born in Limassol and studied law in Moscow. A practicing lawyer, he also helps edit the Cypriot literary magazine Anef, and the Cypriot Theatre Diaries. Georgiou writes in multiple genres - poetry, short stories, plays, novels. His plays have been performed in his home country. His novel An Album of Stories was awarded the Cyprus State Prize and the EU Prize for Literature.

== Selected works ==
- Πανσέληνος παρά μία (Full Moon Minus One), poetry
- Γλυκιά bloody life (Sweet Bloody Life), short stories
- My Beloved Washing Machine, play, winner of the Theatre Prize of the Cyprus Theatre Organization)
- The Disease, play, 2009
- Our Garden, play, 2011
- La Belote, play, 2014
- I Was Lysistrata, play, 2016
- An Album of Stories, novel, 2014, winner of the Cyprus State Prize and the EU Prize for Literature
