= Lucie Faulerová =

Czech writer

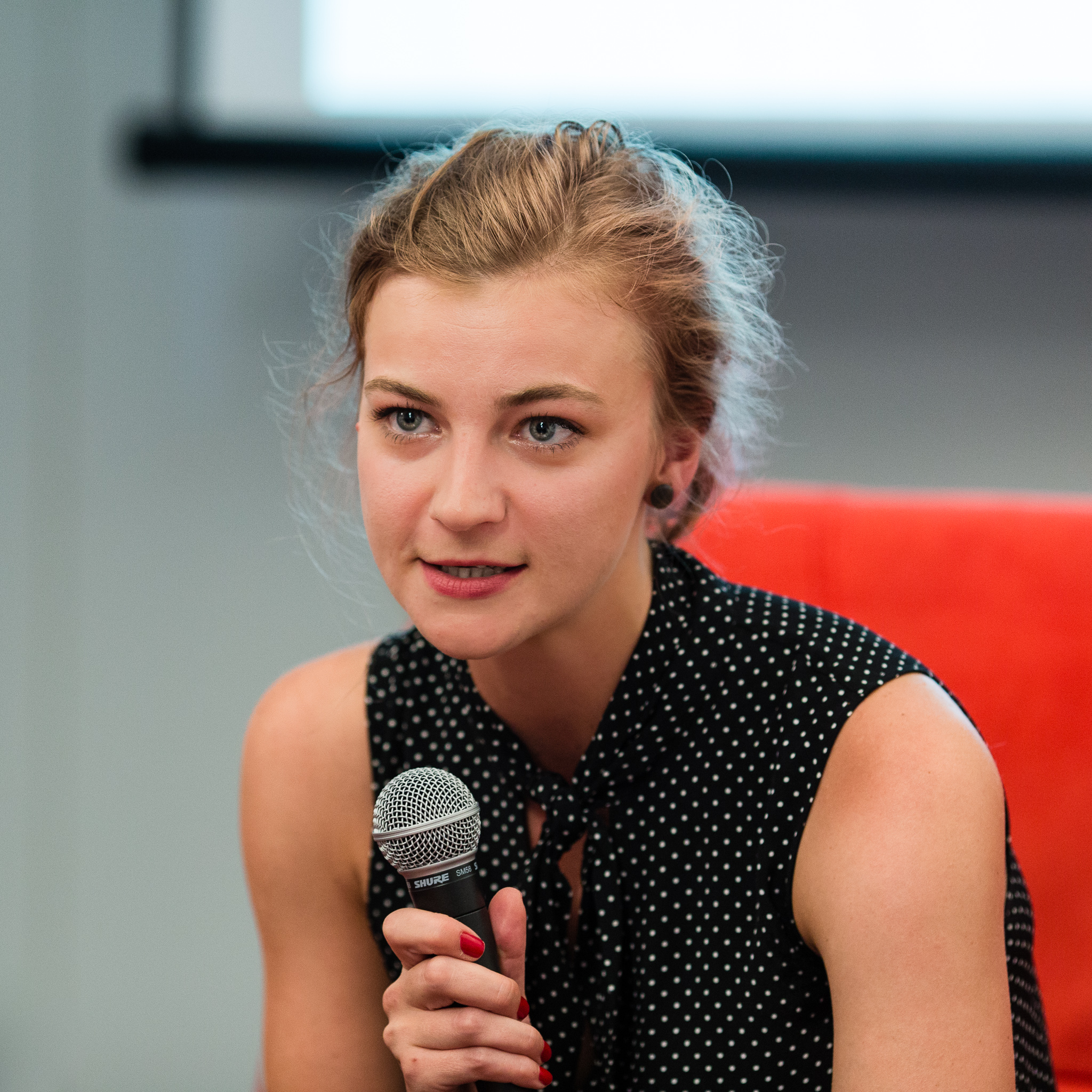
Photo of Lucie Faulerová

Lucie Faulerová (born 1989) is a Czech writer. She got a degree in Czech studies from Palacký University in Olomouc. Her debut novel Lapači prachu (Dust Catchers) was nominated for the 2017 Magnesia Litera Award and the Jiří Orten Award. It has appeared in Spanish and German translation. With Kateřina Šedá, she co-authored the book BRNOX – Průvodce brněnským Bronxem (BRNOX – A guide to Brno’s Bronx), about a poor part of Brno. It won the 2016 Magnesia Litera Award for journalism.

In 2020, Faulerová published the novel Smrtholka (Deathmaiden). It won the 2021 EU Prize for Literature and was nominated for the 2021 Magnesia Litera Award.
