= Ilija Đurović =

Montenegrin writer

Ilija Đurović (born 1990) is a Montenegrin writer. He was born in Podgorica. Đurović has been writing since his teens and he publishes in a wide variety of genres - fiction and non-fiction, poetry, plays and film scripts.

His first collection of short stories came out in 2014. He has published several more books since then:

- Oni to tako divno rade u velikim ljubavnim romanima, short stories,2014
- Crne Ribe, short stories, 2016
- They Do It so Beautifully in Those Great Romantic Novels, 2014
- Black Fish, 2016
- Brink, poetry, 2018
- Sleepers, drama, 2019
- Sampas, novel, 2021

As a columnist, he is a regular contributor to the Montenegrin daily Vijesti. His stories have appeared in English translation in several journals and anthologies. Sampas, his debut novel, was shortlisted for NIN Award for Best Novel 2021. It was also nominated for the EU Prize for Literature.

Đurović lives in Berlin.
