= Sophie Daull =

French actress and writer

Sophie Daull (born 1965) is a French actress and writer. She was born in Belfort and trained at the National Conservatory in Strasbourg. She published her first book Camille, mon Evolée in 2015. This won the best first novel prize from Lire magazine. Her third novel Au Grand Lavoir (2018) won the EU Literature Prize in 2019.
