= Nataša Kramberger =

Slovenian writer and journalist

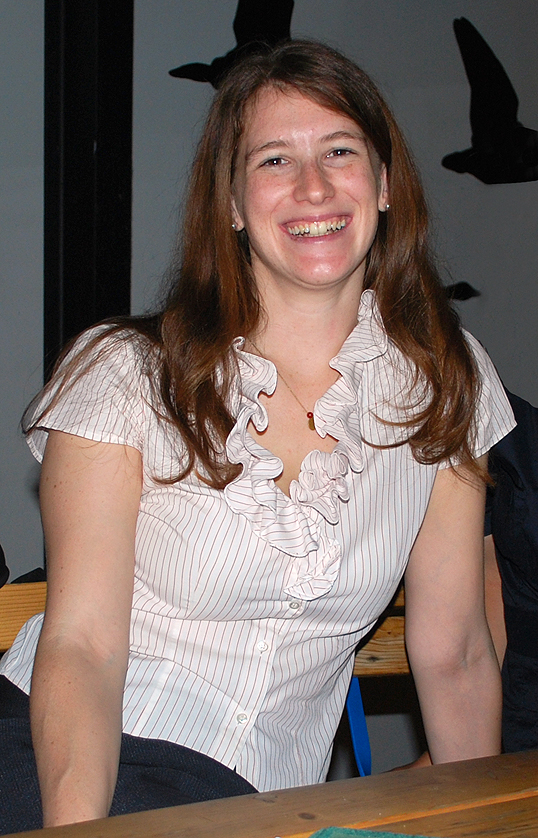
Nataša Kramberger in 2012

Nataša Kramberger (born 14 April 1983) is a Slovenian writer and journalist.

== Life ==
She was born in Maribor and currently lives in Berlin. She is best known for her novel Nebesa v robidah: roman v zgodbah (Heaven in a blackberry bush: a novel in stories). It was nominated for the Kresnik Prize for best Slovenian novel and won the EU Prize for Literature in 2010. It was translated into Italian 2016 for Mimesis edizioni. It was translated to English in 2020 for Litterae Slovenicae by Kristina Reardon.
