= Afonso Cruz =

Portuguese artist and writer

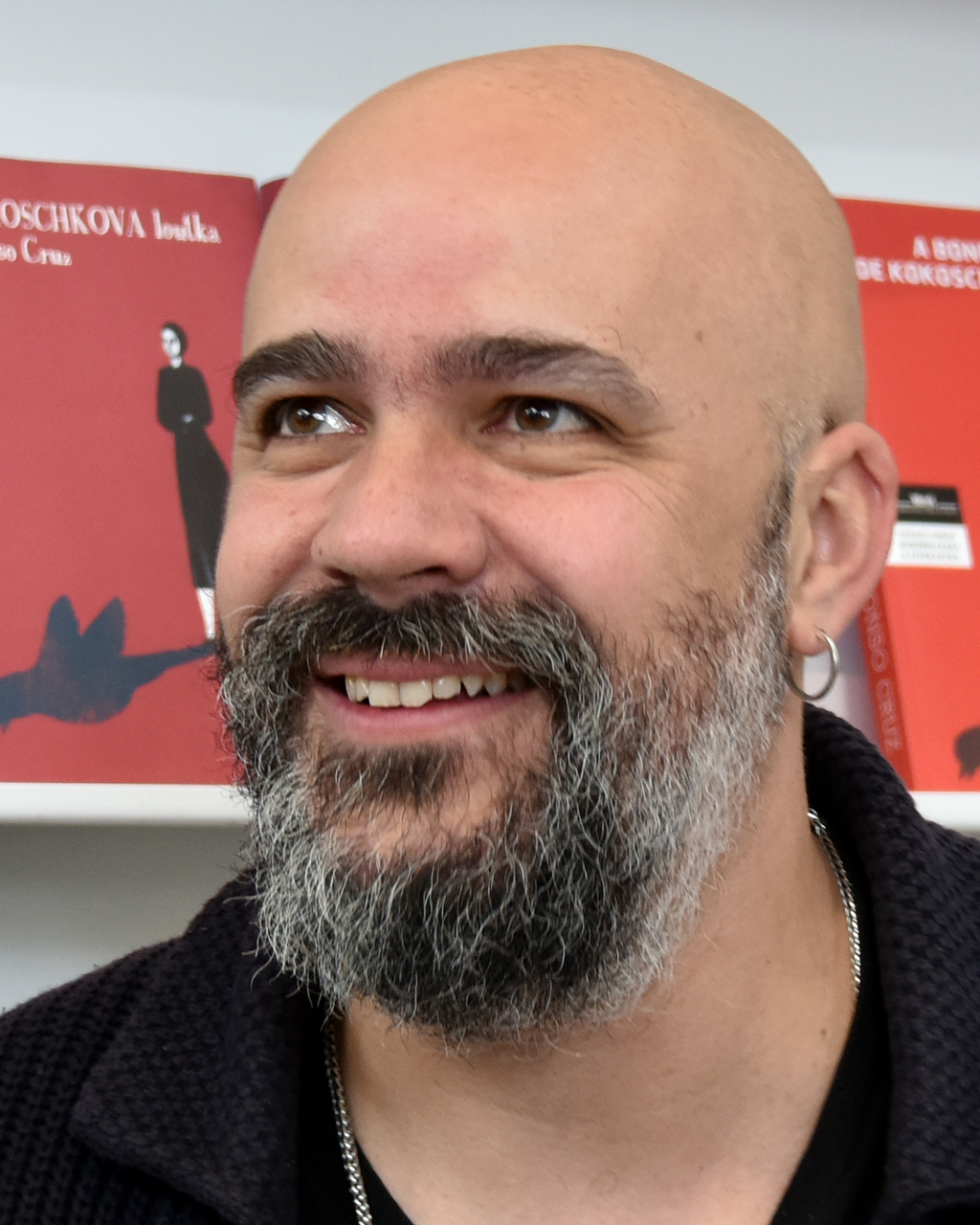
Afonso Cruz (2019)

Afonso Cruz (1971), born in Figueira da Foz, is a Portuguese multidisciplinary artist, author of more than 30 books, among novels, theatre plays, picture books, juvenile novellas, poetry, photo-text and essays.

His books are published in more than 20 languages, and received many awards, like the EU Prize for Literature. for the novel Kokoschka’s Doll. He is also a columnist, illustrator and member of the band The Soaked Lamb.
