= Martina Vidaić =

Croatian poet and novelist (born 1986)

Martina Vidaić (born 1986) is a Croatian poet and novelist. She was born and raised in Zadar, and studied at the University of Zadar.

Her debut collection of poems titled Era gmazova appeared in 2011. This was followed by more collections such as Tamni čovjek Birger, Mehanika peluda and Trg, tržnica, nož. Turning her hand to fiction, she published her first novel Anatomija štakora in 2019. Her second novel Stjenice won the EU Prize for Literature.
