= Francis Kirps =

Luxembourgish writer

- Born: Luxembourg
- Education: University of Strasbourg
- Occupation: Writer
- Writing career
- Language: German
- Notable works: The Mutations, Planet Luxembourg, Die Klasse von 77
- Notable awards: European Union Prize for Literature

Francis Kirps is a Luxembourgish writer. In 2020, he received the European Union Prize for Literature for The Mutations.

== Career ==
He studied psychology at the University of Strasbourg. Some of his early writings appeared in the cultural journal Cahiers Luxembourgeois. He has published two short story collections titled Planet Luxembourg ("Planet Luxemburg" in the original German), and The Mutations ("Die Mutationen"). He also has a novel to his name (Die Klasse von 77, 2016). His work has been published in various anthologies and contemporary short story collections.

Kirps won the EU Prize for Literature for The Mutations. He has been nominated for the Concours Littéraire National prize in his native country. He contributes to literary magazines such as EXOT and newspapers like taz.

Kirps lives and works in Lintgen.
