= Rudi Erebara =

Albanian writer and translator

Rudi Erebara (born 1971) is an Albanian writer and translator. He studied at the Academy of fine arts in Tirana before becoming a journalist.

After graduating from the Academy of Fine Arts in Tirana (en) in 1995, he began a career as a political analyst, journalist and writer. He is the author of two collections of poetry, Fillon Pamja in 1994 and Lëng Argjendi in 2013. He is also the author of two novels, Vezët e thëllëzave in 2010 and Epika e yjeve të mëngjesit in 2016.

He has published works of poetry as well as a couple of novels, namely Vezët e thëllëzave (Eggs of the Quails, 2010) and Epika e yjeve të mëngjesit (The Epic of the Morning Stars, 2016). He was awarded the EU Prize for Literature in 2017.
