= Beqa Adamashvili =

Georgian blogger and writer

Beqa Adamashvili (Georgian: ბექა ადამაშვილი; born 1990) is a Georgian blogger and writer. He studied at Caucasus University, and began publishing short stories on electronic platforms. His first novel Bestseller came out in 2014. In 2019, he won the EU Prize for Literature for his book Everybody Dies in the Novel.

In his professional life, Adamashvili is a creative director for the advertising agency Leavingstone.
