= Tomas Vaiseta =

Tomas Vaiseta (born 1984) is a Lithuanian writer and historian. He obtained a PhD in history and now teaches at Vilnius University.

His fictional books include Paukščių miegas (The Sleep of Birds, short stories, 2014), Orfėjas, kelionė pirmyn ir atgal (Orpheus: A Journey There and Back, novel, 2016), and Ch. (novel, 2021). His novel Ch. was nominated for the European Union Prize for Literature, 2022.

Vaiseta is also a past winner of the Kazimieras Barėnas Literary Prize (Kazimiero Barėno premija), Jurgis Kunčinas Literary Prize (Jurgio Kunčino vardo premija) and Jurga Ivanauskaitė Literary Prize (Jurgos Ivanauskaitės premija).

The Sleep of Birds has been published in English by Strangers Press in 2023, translation by Jeremy Hill.

Vaiseta has also written historical monographs which include Nuobodulio visuomenė: Kasdienybė ir ideologija vėlyvuoju sovietmečiu (1964-1984) (The Society of Boredom: Everyday and Ideology in the Late Soviet Period (1964-1984), 2014), Vasarnamis: Vilniaus psichiatrijos ligoninės socialinė istorija 1944–1990 (Summerhouse: The Social History of the Vilnius Psychiatric Hospital 1944–1990, 2018), and Mažasis o: seksualumo kultūra sovietų Lietuvoje (The Little O: Culture of Sexuality in Soviet Lithuania, 2022), together with historian Valdemaras Klumbys.
