= Raquel Martínez-Gómez =

Spanish writer (born 1973)

Raquel Martínez-Gómez (born 1973) is a Spanish writer. She was born in Albacete, Castilla-La Mancha. She studied at the University of Sussex and the Complutense University of Madrid where she obtained her doctorate.

She has published four novels: Los huecos de la memoria (Memory Gaps), Ceniza de ombú (Ashes of Ombu), Sombras de unicornio (Unicorn Shadows) and Del color de la lava (The Colour of Lava). Unicorn Shadows has been awarded with the EU Prize for Literature. (2010), the Young Ateneo de Sevilla (2007) and has been translated into eight languages. Memory Gaps won the Antonio García Cubas´s Historical Novel Award (INAH, México) in 2018 and The Colour of Lava won the City of Mostoles Prize in 2002.

Currently she is living in the mountains of Madrid, where she has finished her sixth novel. She combines her writing with her work, specializing in the field of sustainable development. She lived in Uruguay, United Kingdom and Mexico. All these places have been integrated in her literary work. From 2015 she has had her own literary blog Ceniza de ombú in the blogosphere “Otro mundo está en marcha”.
