= Marta Dzido =

Polish writer and documentary filmmaker

Marta Dzido (born 1981) is a Polish writer and documentary filmmaker. She is known for her 2018 novel Frajda, and the documentary films Downtown (2010) and Solidarity According to Women (2014).

== Early life and education ==
Marta Dzido was born in 1981.

She studied at the Polish Film School in Łódź.

== Career ==
=== Film ===
Dzido has shot and directed a number of documentary films. She was cinematographer of the documentary Underground Women's State (2009).

She co-directed Downtown (2010) with Piotr Sliwowski, and the film was produced in New York by Sproutflix. The film is about a project by Polish photographer Oiko Petersen, featured photos of people with Down syndrome modelling clothes especially designed for them by leading Polish fashion designers.

Dzido wrote, co-directed, and edited Solidarity according to Women (2014), which commemorated the forgotten role of the Polish female activists engaged in the anti-Communist opposition during the 1980s.

She also wrote, co-directed, and edited the docudrama "Women Power" (2018).

=== Books ===
Dzido has also written several novels, including Frajda (2018), as well as a non-fiction book Women of Solidarity (2016).

== Recognition and awards ==
In 2011, Dzido won the Hollywood Eagle Documentary Award for Downtown. T

Solidarity according to Women won the 2014 Krzysztof Kieslowski Beyond Borders Award, a special award of the Polish Film Institute.

Dzido won the European Union Prize for Literature for her novel Frajda (2018).
