= List of Mexican women writers =

This is a list of women writers who were born in Mexico or whose writings are closely associated with that country.

== A ==
- Liliana Abud (born 1948), actress, screenwriter
- Griselda Álvarez (1913–2009), state governor, poet
- Pita Amor, pen name of Guadalupe Teresa Amor Schmidtlein (1918–2000), actress, poet
- María Anna Águeda de San Ignacio (1695–1756), nun, respected religious writer
- Brigitte Alexander (1911–1995), German-born Mexican playwright, memoirist, actress, translator
- María Luisa Algarra (1916–1957), Spanish-born Mexican playwright
- Carolina Amor de Fournier (1908–1993), editor, publisher, non-fiction writer, translator
- Tamara De Anda (born 1983), feminist activist and writer
- Ikram Antaki (1948–2000), Syrian-born Mexican poet, essayist, translator, wrote in Spanish, French and Arabic
- Elvia Ardalani (born 1963), poet, short story writer
- Araceli Ardón (born 1958), journalist, novelist, short story writer
- Inés Arredondo (1928–1989), Mexican writer, one of the most influential Mexican writers
- Elena Arizmendi Mejia (1884–1949), autobiographer, feminist, established the Neutral White Cross
- Concepcion Cabrera de Armida (1862–1937), mystic, religious writer, author of I Am: Eucharistic Meditations on the Gospel
- Carolina Amor de Fournier (1908–1993) writer and founder of several publishing companies
- Elena Arizmendi Mejia (1884–1949), journalist, autobiography, creator of the White Cross

== B ==
- Rowena Bali (born 1977), novelist, short story writer, poet
- Carmen Barajas Sandoval (1925–2014), best selling biographer, non-fiction writer, screenwriter
- Mimí Bechelani, since 1958 television screenwriter, poet
- Sabina Berman (born 1955), playwright, short story writer, essayist, film director
- Hortensia Blanch Pita (1914–2004), Cuban-born non-fiction writer, later moved to Mexico
- Minerva Bloom (1959–2018), poet, photographer
- Carmen Boullosa (born 1954), leading poet, novelist, playwright
- Liliana V. Blum (born 1974), short story writer, some works translated into English
- Coral Bracho (born 1951), poet, translator
- Anita Brenner (1905–1974), non-fiction author, children's literature author
- Esperanza Brito de Martí (1932–2007), journalist, feminist, journal director

== C ==
- Amalia González Caballero de Castillo Ledón (1898–1986), diplomat, minister, essayist, playwright
- Lydia Cacho (born 1963), investigative journalist, feminist
- Adela Calva Reyes (born 1968), indigenous novelist, educator
- María Enriqueta Camarillo (1872–1968), poet, novelist, short story writer, translator
- Nellie Campobello (1900–1986), narrative writer, memoirist, poet, author of Cartucho
- Julieta Campos (1932–2007), Cuban-Mexican novelist
- Lorea Canales, since 2001, novelist, journalist
- Nancy Cárdenas (1934–1994), actress, playwright, journalist, broadcaster, theatre director
- Rosario Castellanos (1925–1974) poet, essayist, novelist
- Dahlia de la Cerda (born 1985), writer and journalist
- Rita Cetina Gutiérrez (1864–1908) poet, educator, feminist
- Susana Chávez (1974–2011), poet, human rights activist
- Ana Clavel (born 1961), novelist, short story writer
- Teresa del Conde (1935–2017), art critic, historian
- Rosina Conde (born, 1954), narrator, playwright, poet
- Dolores Correa Zapata (1853–1924), teacher, writer, poet, and advocate for women's rights
- Elsa Cross (born 1946), poet, essayist, translator
- Sor Juana Inés de la Cruz (1651–1695), nun, poet
- Mireya Cueto (1922–2013), puppeteer, playwright, non-fiction writer
- Briceida Cuevas (born 1969), poet

== D ==
- Amparo Dávila (1928-2020), poet, short story writer
- Clementina Díaz y de Ovando (1916–2012), historian, essayist, non-fiction writer
- Emma Dolujanoff (1922–2013), novelist
- Guadalupe Dueñas (1910-2002), short story writer, essayist

== E ==
- Anilú Elías (born 1937) feminist writer
- María de los Ángeles Errisúriz (born 1966), teacher, non-fiction writer
- Ximena Escalante (born 1964), playwright, screenwriter, non-fiction writer
- Laura Esquivel (born 1950), novelist, essayist, screenwriter
- Cecilia Eudave (born 1968), short story writer, novelist, essayist, educator

== F ==
- Isabel Fraire (1934–2015), writer, poet, translator and literary critic
- Malva Flores (born 1961), poet, short story writer, essayist
- Mariana Frenk-Westheim (1898–2004), German-born Spanish-Mexican poet, translator

== G ==
- Hermila Galindo (1886–1954), magazine editor, feminist, politician
- Francesca Gargallo (1956–2022), Italian-born Mexican novelist, poet
- Marissa Garrido (1926-2021), telenovela playwright and writer
- Elena Garro (1916–1998), playwright, novelist, short story writer, biographer
- María Luisa Garza (1887–1980), journalist, novelist
- Eve Gil (born 1968), acclaimed novelist, short story writer, poet
- Margo Glantz (born 1930), linguistic scholar, essayist, non-fiction writer
- Dulce María González (1958–2014), journalist, poet, novelist, short story writer
- Reyna Grande (born 1975), novelist, writing in English
- Rosario Green (1941–2017), politician, diplomat, non-fiction writer
- Juana Belén Gutiérrez de Mendoza (1875–1942), journalist, poet, feminist
- Rosario María Gutiérrez Eskildsen (1899–1979), lexicographer, linguist, educator, poet
- Eulalia Guzmán (1890–1985), archeologist, educator, feminist, writer
- Montserrat GA (born 1996), poet, writer

== H ==
- M. G. Harris, Mexican-born British children's writer, author of The Joshua Files (2008)
- María Luisa Ocampo Heredia (1899–1974), novelist, playwright, translator
- Luisa Josefina Hernández (1928–2023), novelist, playwright, critic
- Malú Huacuja del Toro (born 1961), novelist, playwright, screenwriter

== J ==
- Juana Inés de la Cruz (1651–1695), nun, important Golden Age scholar, poet, author of Loa to Divine Narcissus

== K ==
- Helen Kleinbort Krauze, Polish-born Mexican journalist since 1959, columnist, travel writer, with national newspapers and magazines
- Laureana Wright de Kleinhans (1846–1896), journal editor, poet, non-fiction writer, feminist

== L ==
- Marcela Lagarde (born 1948), non-fiction author, politician, feminist
- Marta Lamas (born 1947), feminist, professor, activist, non-fiction author and columnist
- María Ernestina Larráinzar Córdoba (1854-1925), writer, novelist, teacher, religious order founder
- Patricia Laurent Kullick (born 1962), short story writer and novelist
- Mónica Lavín, (born 1955) novelist, short story writer, columnist, essayist, screenplay writer
- Rossy Evelin Lima (born 1986), poet, linguist, translator
- Guadalupe Loaeza (born 1946), novelist, short story writer, columnist
- Pura López Colomé (born 1952), poet, translator
- Margarita López Portillo (1914–2006) novelist and politician
- Valeria Luiselli (born 1983), novelist, non-fiction writer, essayist

== M ==
- Guadalupe Marín (1895–1983) novelist, model
- Adelaida Martínez Aguilar (1870 — ?), teacher, writer, and poet
- Sanjuana Martínez (born 1963), journalist, non-fiction writer
- Ángeles Mastretta (born 1949), journalist, novelist
- María Luisa Mendoza (1930–2018) journalist, novelist, columnist
- Concha Michel (1899–1990), singer-songwriter, playwright, archivist and non-fiction writer
- Margarita Michelena (1917–1998), poet, critic, translator, journalist
- María del Carmen Millán (1914–1982), academic, writer, 1st woman elected to the Mexican Academy of Letters
- Alice-Leone Moats (1908–1989), Mexican-born American journalist, columnist, travel writer
- Magdalena Mora (1952–1981), activist, feminist writer
- Myriam Moscona (born 1955), journalist, translator, poet
- Angelina Muñiz-Huberman (born 1936), poet, short story writer
- Verónica Murguía (born 1960), children's literature, fantasy fiction, novelist

== N ==
- Julia Nava de Ruisánchez (1883–1964), activist, educator, journalist, non-fiction writer
- Guadalupe Nettel (born 1973), novelist, short story writer
- Eva Norvind (1944–2006), Norwegian-born Mexican playwright, screenwriter, actress

== O ==
- Orlandina de Oliveira (born 1943), Brazilian-born Mexican sociologist, academic, non-fiction writer
- Emilia Ortiz (1917–2012), painter, cartoonist, poet
- Amaranta Osorio Cepeda (born 1978), playwright, actress

== P ==
- Cristina Pacheco (1941–2023), journalist, television presenter
- Susana Pagano (born 1968), novelist, short story writer
- Edmée Pardo Murray (born 1965) novelist
- Margarita Peña (1937-2018), non-fiction writer
- Beatríz Peniche Barrera (1893–1976), poet, feminist, one of three first elected female politicians in Mexico
- María Dolores Pérez Enciso (1908–1949), Spanish-born Mexican journalist, prose writer
- Aline Pettersson (born 1938), novelist, poet
- Elena Poniatowska (born 1932), French-born Mexican journalist, essayist, novelist, non-fiction writer
- María Luisa Puga (1944–2004), novelist, short story writer, essayist, children's writer

== R ==
- Marta Randall (born 1948), Mexican-born American science-fiction novelist, short story writer
- Antonieta Rivas Mercado (1900–1931), journalist, playwright
- Cristina Rivera Garza (born 1964), novelist, short story writer, poet, non-fiction writer, translator
- Margarita Robles de Mendoza (1896–1954) feminist writer, journalist
- Jesusa Rodríguez (born 1955), director, actress, playwright
- Sandra Rodríguez Nieto, contemporary journalist
- Rosamaría Roffiel (born 1945), poet, novelist, journalist, and editor
- Emma Romeu, Cuban-born Mexican journalist, novelist, essayist

== S ==
- Sara Sefchovich (born 1949), novelist, essayist, translator
- Esther Seligson (1941–2010), novelist, short story writer, poet, essayist, translator
- Carla Stellweg, art curator, writer

== T ==
- Daniela Tarazona (born 1975), writer and journalist
- Altaír Tejeda de Tamez (1922–2015), short story writer, poet, playwright, essayist, journalist
- Natalia Toledo (born 1968), poet, writes in Spanish and Zapotec
- Elena Torres (1893–1970), revolutionary, women's rights activist, essayist, autobiographer
- Gabriela Torres Olivares (born 1982), short story writer, novelist
- Julia Tuñón Pablos (born 1948), historian, feminist writer

== U ==
- Lourdes Urrea (born 1954), poet, novelist, young adult writer

== V ==
- Estrella del Valle (born 1971), poet
- Yolanda Vargas Dulché (1926–1999), journalist, comic book writer, author of Memín Pinguín
- Socorro Venegas (born 1972), short story writer, novelist
- Josefina Vicens (1911–1988), acclaimed novelist, screenwriter, journalist
- Maruxa Vilalta (1932–2014), Spanish-born Mexican playwright, novelist
- Andrea Villarreal (1881–1963), revolutionary, journalist, feminist
- Carmen Villoro, (born 1958), poet, journalist, children's story writer

== Z ==
- Elena Zelayeta (1898-1974), Mexican-born American cookbook author
- Sylvia Aguilar Zéleny (born 1973), novelist, short story writer
- Rose Zwi (1928–2018), Mexican-born South African novelist, short story writer

== See also ==
- List of Mexican writers
- List of women writers
- List of Spanish-language authors
