= Cepeda =

Cepeda may refer to:

- Cepeda (surname)

== Places ==
- Castelões de Cepeda, former civil parish in the municipality of Paredes, Portugal
- Cepeda la Mora, town in Ávila Province, Spain
- Cepeda, Salamanca, Spain
- Dehesa de la Cepeda, an exclave of Madrid surrounded by Castile and León
- Fontoria de Cepeda, small city in León Province, Spain
- General Cepeda, city in Coahuila, Mexico
- La Cepeda, comarca in León Province, Spain
- Magaz de Cepeda, municipality in the province of León, Castile and León, Spain

== Battles ==
- Battle of Cepeda (1820)
- Battle of Cepeda (1859)
