= Cepeda (surname) =

- Etymology: Cepeda
- Place of origin: Salamanca, Spain

Cepeda is a Spanish surname dating back to the 12th century. Notable people with the surname include:

- Amaranta Osorio Cepeda (born 1978), Mexican playwright, actress and arts manager
- Andrés Cepeda (born 1973), Colombian singer
- Angie Cepeda (born 1974), Colombian actress
- Arturo Cepeda (born 1969), Mexican-American Catholic prelate
- Bonny Cepeda (born 1954), Dominican Republic musician
- Boris Cepeda (born 1974), German-Ecuadorian Pianist and Diplomat
- Christian Cepeda (born 1991), Argentine professional footballer
- Cláudia Cepeda (born 1967), Brazilian actress
- Diego Ramirez de Cepeda (died 1629), Peruvian Roman Catholic prelate
- Dolores Cepeda (1965–1977), American girl strangled and raped by the Hillside Stranglers
- Enrique Cepeda, Cuban paralympic athlete
- Francisco Cepeda (1532–1602), Spanish-Dominican missionary
- Francisco Cepeda (cyclist) (1906–1935), Spanish cyclist
- Frederich Cepeda (born 1980), Cuban baseball player
- Iván Cepeda, Colombian politician
- Jefferson Alexander Cepeda (born 1998), Ecuadorian cyclist
- Jefferson Alveiro Cepeda (born 1996), Ecuadorian cyclist
- José Cevallos Cepeda (1831–1893), Mexican politician and military leader
- Julio Cepeda (born 1932), Mexican cyclist
- Laura Cepeda (born 1953), Spanish actress
- Liliana "Barbarita" Cepeda (1990–1997), Puerto Rican girl whose death caused an investigation
- Lorna Cepeda (born 1970), Colombian actress
- Luis Cepeda (born 1989), Spanish singer
- Manuel Cepeda (born 1930), assassinated Colombian lawyer and Senator
- Marco Cepeda (born 1974), Spanish middle-distance runner
- Natividad Cepeda, Spanish poet, writer and habitual columnist
- Orlando Cepeda (1937–2024), Puerto Rican former Major League Baseball player
- Pedro Cepeda (1905–1955), Puerto Rican baseball player
- Rafael Cepeda (1910–1996), patriarch of the musical Cepeda family
- Ramiro Cepeda (born 1975), former Argentine football manager and former player
- Raquel Cepeda (born 1973), American journalist, critic, film-maker, and autobiographer
- Rolando Cepeda (born 1989), Cuban male volleyball player
- Rubén Cepeda (born 1994), Chilean footballer
- Santiago Cepeda (born 1986), Colombian poet and novelist
- Teresa de Cepeda y Fuentes (1566–1610)), Ecuadorian-born Spanish Discalced Carmelite nun
- Wellington Cepeda (born 1973), Dominican former professional baseball player and current coach
- Wilson Cepeda (born 1980), Colombian road cyclist
