= Carneros, León =

Carneros
- Locality
- Location within Province of León Location within Castile and León Location within Spain
- Coordinates: 42°28′33″N 6°2′52″W
- Country: Spain
- Autonomous community: Castile and León
- Province: Province of León
- Municipality: Villaobispo de Otero
- Elevation: 930 m (3,050 ft)

Population
  - Total: 111

Carneros is a locality located in the municipality of Villaobispo de Otero, in León province, Castile and León, Spain. As of 2020, it has a population of 111.

== Geography ==
Carneros is located 52km west-southwest of León, Spain.
