= Otero de Escarpizo =

- Minor local entity
- Location within Province of León Location within Castile and León Location within Spain
- Coordinates: 42°30′59″N 6°3′38″W
- Country: Spain
- Autonomous community: Castile and León
- Province: Province of León
- Municipality: Villaobispo de Otero
- Elevation: 886 m (2,907 ft)

Population
  - Total: 55

Otero de Escarpizo is a locality and minor local entity located in the municipality of Villaobispo de Otero, in León province, Castile and León, Spain. As of 2020, it has a population of 55.

== Geography ==
Otero de Escarpizo is located 56km west-southwest of León, Spain.
