= Fontoria de Cepeda =

Coordinates: 42°31′3.498″N 6°2′28.14″W

Fontoria de Cepeda is a small city located in the municipality of Villamejil, in the province of León, Castile and León, northern Spain. Fontoria has got a church on the hilltop, appeal "Otero"

Fontoria is located at 7.5 kilometers on the road to Astorga, in a vegetation-rich area along the water of a river.

== Main sights ==
The town's church is home to the Christ of Fontoria, an image revered in all Baja Cepeda.

According to the local people, the image of Christ came from the church in the village of Perales, remote place that is located on a hill, between Fontoria and Otero.
