= Revilla, León =

Revilla
- Minor local entity
- Location within Province of León Location within Castile and León Location within Spain
- Coordinates: 42°32′21″N 6°2′14″W
- Country: Spain
- Autonomous community: Castile and León
- Province: Province of León
- Municipality: Villamejil
- Elevation: 893 m (2,930 ft)

Population
  - Total: 7

Revilla is a locality and minor local entity located in the municipality of Villamejil, in León province, Castile and León, Spain. As of 2020, it has a population of 7.

== Geography ==
Revilla is located 57km west of León, Spain.
