= Sopeña de Carneros =

- Minor local entity
- Location within Province of León Location within Castile and León Location within Spain
- Coordinates: 42°29′18″N 6°2′44″W
- Country: Spain
- Autonomous community: Castile and León
- Province: Province of León
- Municipality: Villaobispo de Otero
- Elevation: 858 m (2,815 ft)

Population
  - Total: 84

Sopeña de Carneros is a locality and minor local entity located in the municipality of Villaobispo de Otero, in León province, Castile and León, Spain. As of 2020, it has a population of 84.

== Geography ==
Sopeña de Carneros is located 51km west-southwest of León, Spain.
