= Quintana de Fon =

- Minor local entity
- Location within Province of León Location within Castile and León Location within Spain
- Coordinates: 42°31′49″N 6°2′8″W
- Country: Spain
- Autonomous community: Castile and León
- Province: Province of León
- Municipality: Villamejil
- Elevation: 890 m (2,920 ft)

Population
  - Total: 35

Quintana de Fon is a locality and minor local entity located in the municipality of Villamejil, in León province, Castile and León, Spain. As of 2020, it has a population of 35.

== Geography ==
Quintana de Fon is located 56km west of León.
