= Malú Huacuja del Toro =

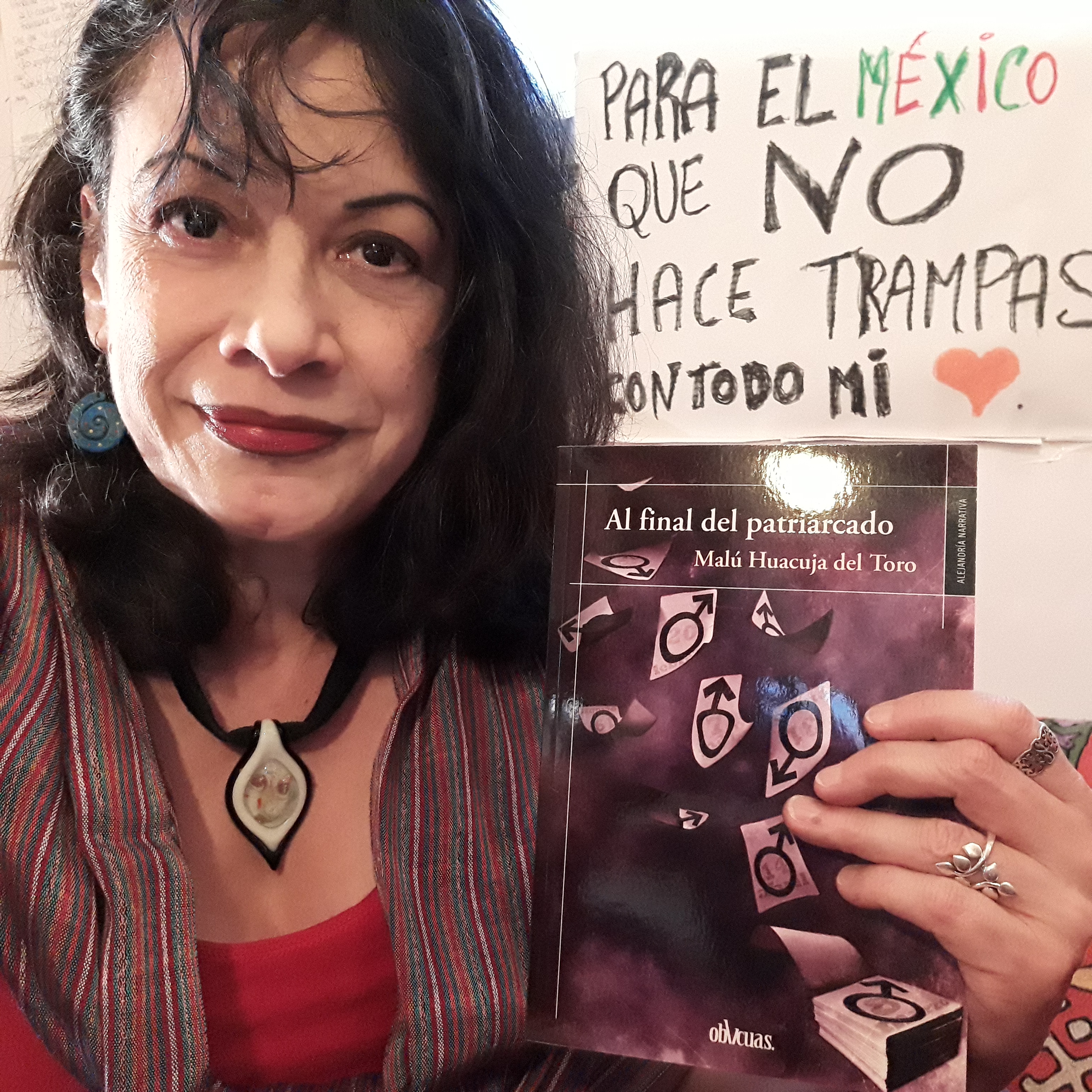

Malú Huacuja del Toro (born 1961) is a feminist, awarded Mexican novelist´, playwright and screenwriter.

== Biography ==
She was born in Mexico City. She’s the first crime novel author of Latin America with a feminist twist. She has published ninenovels, four short-story collections, and two screenplays in Spanish. Her first novel, Crimen sin faltas de ortografía (Crime without Spelling Mistakes) published when she was 25, was judged best finalist in the Plaza & Janés First International Crime Novel Competition in Spanish, and sold the entire first edition within two months.

She is the author of the first "anti-soap opera" (anti-novella) broadcast on Mexican television: Amor por televisión (Imevisión 1988, directed by Alejandro Gamboa More about this.). It was a parody of Latin American soap operas and the Mexican "star system". She has sold numerous satirical, fiction and crime stories for TV and radio programs in Mexico, like the radio mystery series Tirando a matar (Shooting to Kill, directed by Lynn Fainchtein Nucleo Radio Mil, 1989) as well as more than 20 political cabaret shows produced during the 90's in Teatro Bar El Hábito in Mexico City, directed by Jesusa Rodríguez, and plays like The Sky Below or Cabaret Prehispánico (commissioned play hired and directed by Jesusa Rodríguez), and screenplays, like El Amor de tu Vida SA (The Love of Your Life, Inc.), winner of the Audience Award at the Semana de Cine Iberoamericano, 1997 and Ariel Award for Opera Prima 1997. Her screenplay "A God for Cordelia" (film adaptation of her novel) was selected for the Script Reading and Good-To-Go programs of the 13th Annual Female Eye Film Festival in Toronto, Canada, in 2015. She wrote the screenplay of the movie "Rencor tatuado" directed by multi-awarded director Julián Hernández, now on Netflix.

She now lives in New York City. She writes both in English and Spanish. Her first play in English, Celebrities Shouldn't Have Children, was produced and directed in New York City by Venezuelan artist Leo Zelig, in 2004. Her short story Diabolical Compassion was selected finalist in the 2002 Arts & Letters Fiction Contest. Her screenplay "Faustus in Hollywood" was in the short-list nomination for best innovative screenplay at the Female Eye Film Festival 2019, and won finalist of the Hollywood Jumbo Screenplay Competition 2020 and Chicago Screenplay Awards 2020.

== Works ==
=== Novels ===
- Crimen sin faltas de ortografía (Crime Without Spelling Mistakes), Océano, México, 1995; Hobby and Work, Italy, 1999; Plaza y Valdés, http://www.plazayvaldes.com, México, 2000)
- Un cadáver llamado Sara, (Op-Ed sabadoUnomasuno newsletter, 1987–88)
- Un Dios para Cordelia (A God for Cordelia), Océano 1995; Plaza y Valdés, México, 2004; Recorded Books, US, 2004
- La lágrima, la gota y el artificio (Tears, Drops, and Special Effects), Ariadna, México, 2006; Recorded Books, US, 2007, Plaza y Valdés, México, 2010 (Reprinted).
- La invención del enemigo (The Invention of the Enemy), Plaza y Valdés, México, 2008.
- Crueldad en subasta (Cruelty in Auction), Amazon, 2015.
- "Al final del patriarcado" ("At the End of Patriarchy"), Ediciones Oblicuas, Barcelona, Spain, 2021.
- "Todo es personal" ("Everything is Personal"), Malpaso Ediciones, Barcelona, Spain, 2021.

Las razones menos pensadas ("The Least Thoughtful Reasons"), Science Fiction, Malpaso Ediciones, Salto de Página, Mexico City, Mexico, 2025.

=== Short story collections ===
- Herejía contra el ciberespacio (Heresy against Cyberspace), Océano, 1997
- Tomo cero del álbum de la obscenidad (The Album of Obscenity), Plaza y Valdés, 2002
- Crónicas anticonceptivas (Contraceptive Chronicles), Colección Cuadernos de El Financiero, México, 2006
- El suidicio y otros cuentos (Suicide and Other Tales), Plaza y Valdés, México, 2013.

=== Theater (originally written in English) ===
- Celebrities Shouldn't Have Children (Gene Frankel Theater, 2004).
- "Quixota in the Time of Trump", a comedy monologue performed at the legendary Cornelia Street Cafe, NYC, 2017.

=== Screenplays ===
- El Amor de tu Vida S.A. (Plaza y Valdés, 1997)
- Los artistas de la técnica (Plaza y Valdés, 1997)
- "A God for Cordelia" (film adaptation from the novel "Un Dios para Cordelia"), 2002 (Spanish) 2014 (English).
- Rencor tatuado (original story 1996-Screenplay adapted for Julián Hernández, 2016) directed by Julián Hernández.
