= Castrillo de Cepeda =

- Minor local entity
- Location within Province of León Location within Castile and León Location within Spain
- Coordinates: 42°35′11″N 6°1′5″W
- Country: Spain
- Autonomous community: Castile and León
- Province: Province of León
- Municipality: Villamejil
- Elevation: 926 m (3,038 ft)

Population
  - Total: 132

Castrillo de Cepeda is a locality and minor local entity located in the municipality of Villamejil, in León province, Castile and León, Spain. As of 2020, it has a population of 132.

== Geography ==
Castrillo de Cepeda is located 62km west of León, Spain.
