= Villamejil =

- Municipality
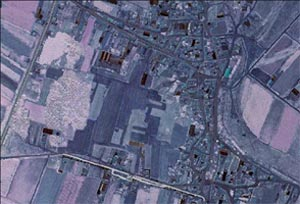
- Satellite view

- Coat of arms

- Location within Spain
- Coordinates: 42°33′44″N 6°01′23″W
- Country: Spain
- Community: Castile and León
- Province: León
- Comarca: La Cepeda

Government
  - Mayor: Ángel Carrera Fernández (PSOE)

Area
  - Total: 78.98 km^{2} (30.49 sq mi)
- Elevation: 912 m (2,992 ft)

Population (2025-01-01)
  - Total: 653
  - Density: 8.27/km^{2} (21.4/sq mi)
- Time zone: UTC+1 (CET)
  - Summer (DST): UTC+2 (CEST)
- Postal code: 24711

Villamejil is a municipality located in the province of León, Castile and León, Spain. As of 2010 (data from INE), the municipality has a population of 545 inhabitants.

It is part of the historical region of La Cepeda.

== Villages ==
- Castrillo de Cepeda
- Cogorderos
- Fontoria de Cepeda
- Quintana de Fon
- Revilla
- Sueros de Cepeda
- Villamejil
