= Brimeda =

- Minor local entity
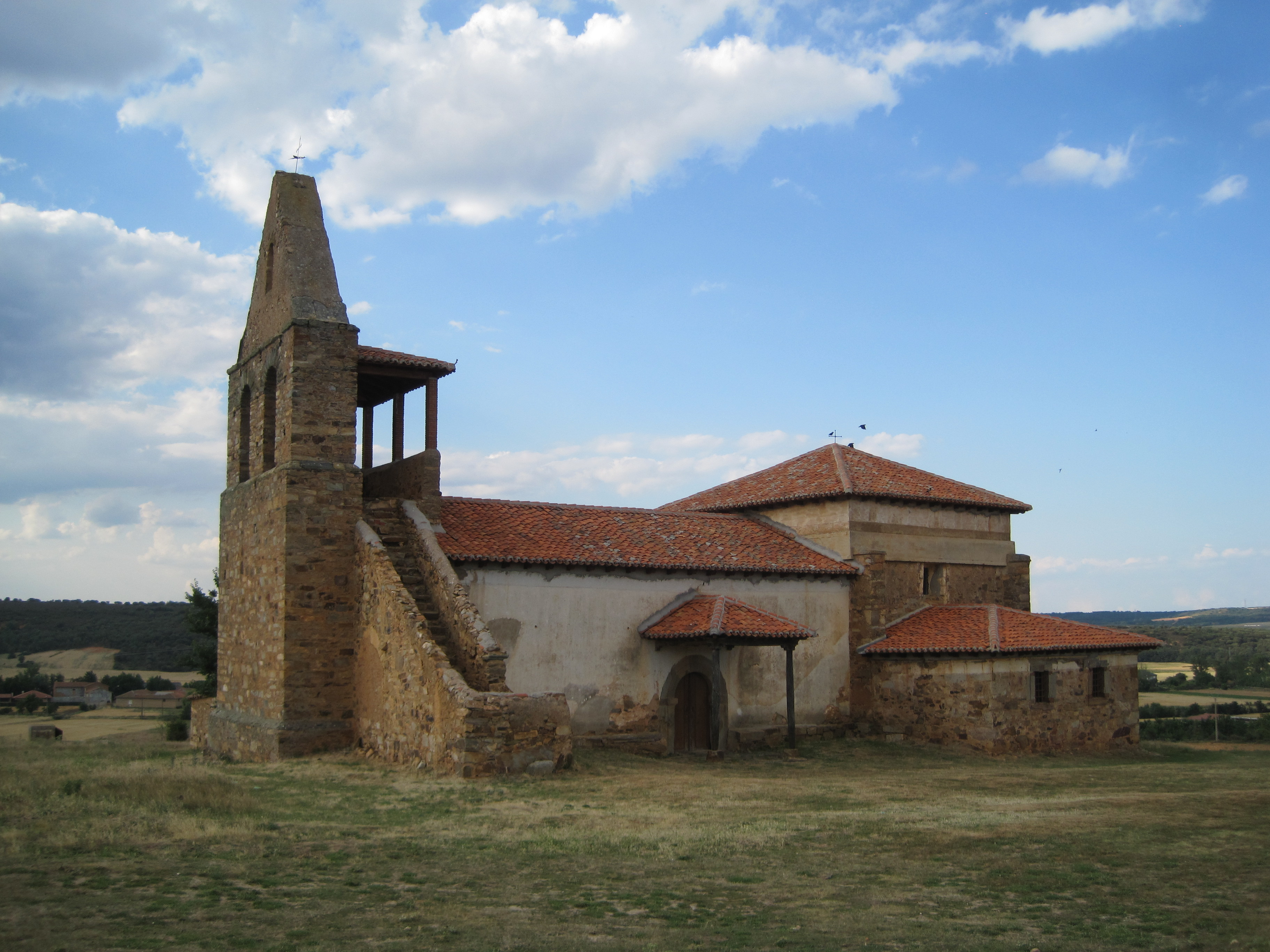

- Location within Province of León Location within Castile and León Location within Spain
- Coordinates: 42°29′20″N 6°4′1″W
- Country: Spain
- Autonomous community: Castile and León
- Province: Province of León
- Municipality: Villaobispo de Otero
- Elevation: 871 m (2,858 ft)

Population
  - Total: 100

Brimeda is a locality and minor local entity located in the municipality of Villaobispo de Otero, in León province, Castile and León, Spain. As of 2020, it has a population of 100.

== Geography ==
Brimeda is located 55km west-southwest of León.
