= Cogorderos =

- Minor local entity
- Location within Province of León Location within Castile and León Location within Spain
- Coordinates: 42°32′37″N 6°1′43″W
- Country: Spain
- Autonomous community: Castile and León
- Province: Province of León
- Municipality: Villamejil
- Elevation: 899 m (2,949 ft)

Population
  - Total: 100

Cogorderos is a locality and minor local entity located in the municipality of Villamejil, in León province, Castile and León, Spain. As of 2020, it has a population of 100.

== Geography ==
Cogorderos is located 57km west of León, Spain. Cogorderos is situated in the fertile valley of the Tuerto River, surrounded by cultivated fields and gentle hills at the foothills of the Montes de León. It lies approximately 11 km north of Astorga and is accessible via the LE-451 road. The village's elevation is about 918 meters above sea level.
