= Sueros de Cepeda =

- Minor local entity
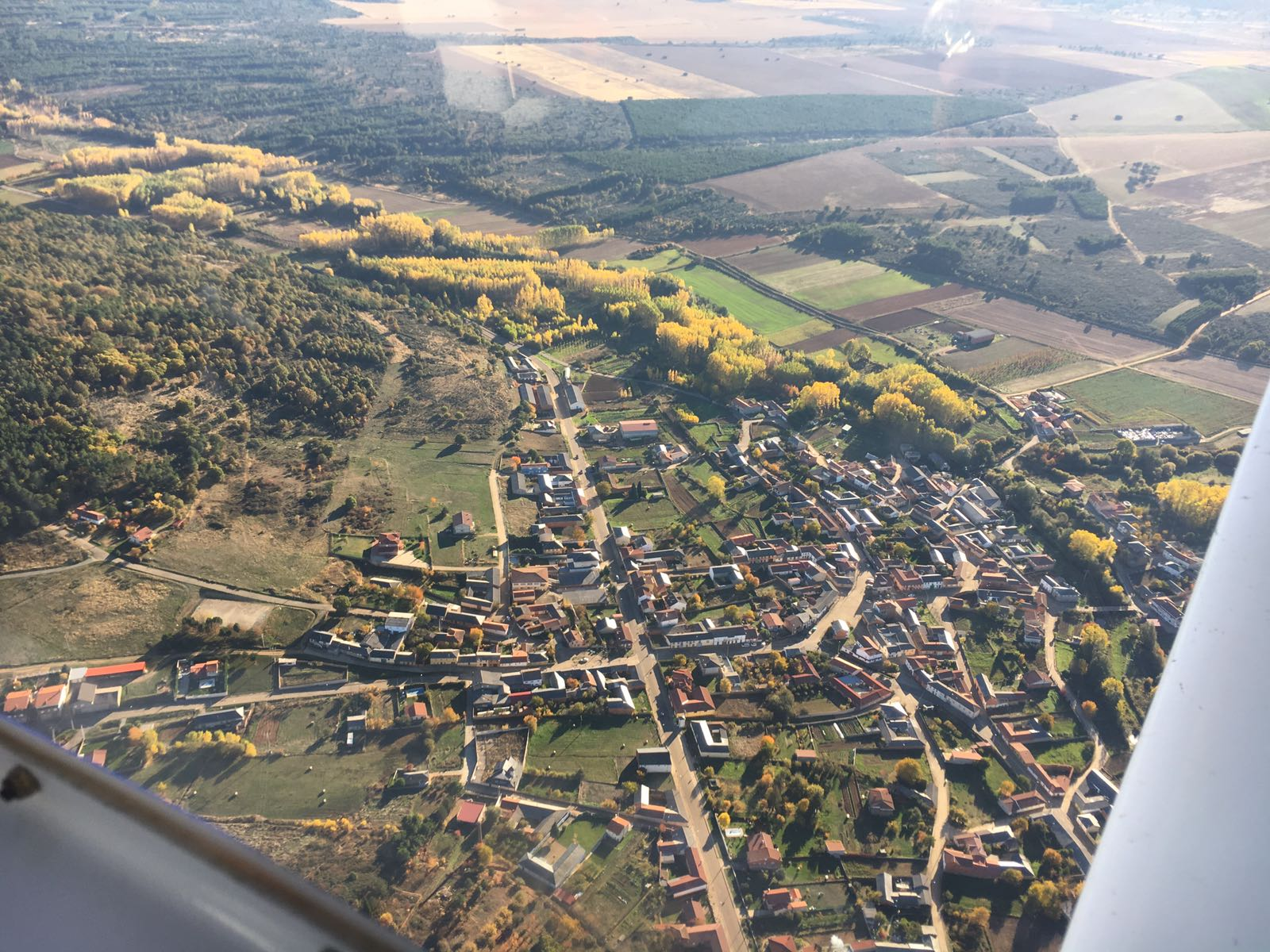

- Location within Province of León Location within Castile and León Location within Spain
- Coordinates: 42°36′36″N 6°2′7″W
- Country: Spain
- Autonomous community: Castile and León
- Province: Province of León
- Municipality: Villamejil
- Elevation: 941 m (3,087 ft)

Population
  - Total: 239

Sueros de Cepeda is a locality and minor local entity located in the municipality of Villamejil, in León province, Castile and León, Spain. As of 2020, it has a population of 239.

== Geography ==
Sueros de Cepeda is located 44km west of León, Spain.
