= Vanidodes =

- Minor local entity
- Location within Province of León Location within Castile and León Location within Spain
- Coordinates: 42°32′31″N 6°6′48″W
- Country: Spain
- Autonomous community: Castile and León
- Province: Province of León
- Municipality: Magaz de Cepeda
- Elevation: 942 m (3,091 ft)

Population
  - Total: 32

Vanidodes is a locality and minor local entity located in the municipality of Magaz de Cepeda, in the province of León, Castile and León, Spain. As of 2020, it has a population of 32.

== Geography ==
Vanidodes is located 65km west of León, Spain.
