= Instituto Nacional para la Educación de los Adultos =

Mexican advisory body

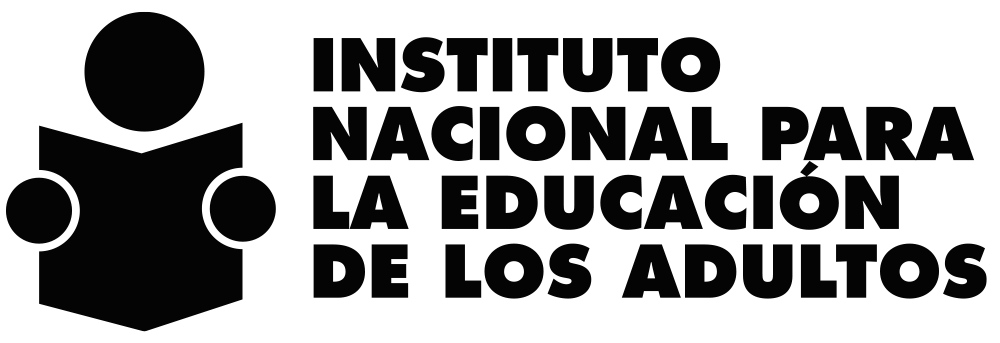

The Instituto Nacional para la Educación de los Adultos (English: National Institute for Adult Education), abbreviated INEA, is a decentralized public organization of the Mexican federal public administration, grouped in the sector coordinated by the Ministry of Education Public, with legal personality and its own patrimony, created by presidential decree on August 31, 1981.

The INEA develops educational models, didactic materials, systems for the evaluation of learning, conducts research to strengthen education with young people and adults, and certifies basic education for those who have not completed or completed said studies in the terms of article 43 of the General Education Law which establishes that adult education is intended for individuals aged 15 or more than that they have not completed or completed primary and secondary education and can no longer join the school system. This education is provided through the services of:

- Literacy
- Primary education
- Secondary education
- Training for work with the particularities appropriate to said population.

== Operational Structure ==
There are 26 state institutes for adult education (IEEA) and six delegations

Acronym	Name of Institute
INEPJA	Instituto para la Educación de las Personas Jóvenes y Adultas de Aguascalientes
INEA	Instituto Nacional para la Educación de los Adultos en Baja California (Delegation)
IEEA	Instituto Estatal de Educación para los Adultos en Baja California Sur
IEEA	Instituto Estatal de la Educación para los Adultos de Campeche
IEEA	Instituto Estatal de Educación para los Adultos de Coahuila
IEEA	Instituto Estatal de Educación para los Adultos de Colima
IEEA	Instituto Estatal de Educación para los Adultos de Chiapas
ICHEA	Instituto Chihuahuense de Educación para los Adultos
INEA	Instituto Nacional para la Educación de los Adultos Delegación Distrito Federal (Delegation)
IDEA	Instituto Duranguense de Educación para los Adultos
INAEBA	Instituto de Alfabetización y Educación Básica para Adultos de Guanajuato
IEEJA	Instituto Estatal para la Educación de Jóvenes y Adultos de Guerrero
IHEA	Instituto Hidalguense para la Educación de los Adultos
INEEJAD	Instituto Estatal para la Educación de Jóvenes y Adultos de Jalisco
INEA	Instituto Nacional para la Educación de los Adultos en el Estado de México (Delegation)
INEA	Instituto Nacional para la Educación de los Adultos en Michoacán (Delegation)
IEEA	Instituto Estatal de Educación para los Adultos de Morelos
INEA	Instituto Nayarita de Educación para Adultos
INEA	Instituto Nacional para la Educación de los Adultos en Nuevo León (Delegation)
IEEA	Instituto Estatal de Educación para los Adultos de Oaxaca
IEEA	Instituto Estatal de Educación para los Adultos de Puebla
INEA	Instituto Nacional para la Educación de los Adultos en Querétaro (Delegation)
IEEA	Instituto Estatal de Educación para los Adultos de Quintana Roo
IEEA	Instituto Estatal de Educación para Adultos de San Luis Potosí
ISEA	Instituto Sinaloense de Educación para los Adultos
ISEA	Instituto Sonorense de Educación para los Adultos
IEAT	Instituto de Educación para Adultos de Tabasco
ITEA	Instituto Tamaulipeco de Educación para los Adultos
ITEA	Instituto Tlaxcalteca para la Educación de los Adultos
IVEA	Instituto Veracruzano de Educación para los Adultos
IEAEY	Instituto de Educación para los Adultos del Estado de Yucatán
IZEA	Instituto Zacatecano de Educación para los Adultos

=== INEA Delegations ===
The Delegations are the representations of the National Institute for Adult Education, which in a decentralized manner are responsible for the operation of the education services provided by the Institute in the Federal Entities that have not participated in the Coordination Agreement for the Decentralization of educational services.

=== State Institute of Adult Education (IEEA) ===
The State Institutes are the decentralized public bodies of the State governments, with legal personality and their own assets, responsible for adult education in the states, which participated in the Coordination Agreement for the Decentralization of educational services.

=== Zone Coordination ===
Institutional administrative unit of an IEEA or Delegation of the INEA, responsible, within a specific territorial area, for the promotion, incorporation and care of students and solidarity figures; the provision of educational services, accreditation and certification of knowledge; of the endowment of the supports and materials so that these services work, and of the information and documentation derived from them.

=== Community Square ===
Educational space open to the community, it has three important rooms, the face-to-face room, the computer room and the audiovisual room, Internet, compact discs, videos and books, as well as an educational advisory service, so that people learn, develop, accredit and certify their basic education.

=== Study Circle ===
Group of students who meet to study and learn, supported by a supportive educational advisor, at a time agreed between them.

=== Meeting Point ===
Operative unit open to the target population, which has comprehensive educational services, included in the application headquarters, which is located in a stable physical place, recognized and endorsed by the IEEA or INEA. It must maintain a minimum average attendance of 40 active students in urban areas and 20 active students in rural areas at the registered address; at least a third of them accrediting monthly exams.

=== Educating ===
Person who receives an educational service from the INEA.

=== Solidarity figures ===
Civil society people who, voluntarily, and without establishing any employment relationship with the INEA, with the delegations or with the IEEA, participate through the boards that make up the solidarity network, support educational, promotional or operational tasks, in direct benefit of young people and adults cared for in the program.

=== Literacy teacher ===
Solidarity figure that facilitates the learning of reading, writing and basic mathematics with the module The word .

=== Bilingual literacy worker ===
A figure who speaks, reads and writes in both Spanish and his mother tongue and facilitates the learning of reading and writing for young people and adults in their indigenous language and Spanish, through the modules: I begin to read and write my tongue; Let's speak Spanish and I'm starting to read and write my language; Let's speak Spanish and I'm starting to read and write in Spanish.http://www.inea.gob.mx/index.php/inicio-portal-inea/mevyt/eadulmevytindbc.html

=== Advisor ===
Generic name to refer to the solidarity figures that facilitate learning, such as: educational advisers, bilingual educational advisers, Group Educational Counselors, Educational Counselors for people with disabilities and interpreter assistants and Teaching Technicians.

=== Educational Advisor ===
Solidarity figure that supports the educational services area or the Academic Directorate in the processes of organization, tutoring, supervision and monitoring of users of training, study circles or advisers. Participate in training actions, in person or remotely.

=== Bilingual educational advisor ===
Solidarity figure who speaks, reads and writes both in Spanish and his native indigenous language, with which he facilitates the learning of students belonging to his own indigenous group, through motivation, academic support and continuous feedback to maintain their participation in the study, especially in a group. Participate in training programs.

=== Interpreter Assistant ===
Spanish-speaking solidarity figure who collaborates as a group assistant to the bilingual advisor for the teaching and reinforcement of Spanish as a second language.

=== Group educational counselor ===
Solidarity figure that facilitates the learning of several students with similar characteristics (elementary students 10–14, with disabilities or agricultural laborers), provided that they are formed in a group, through motivation, academic orientation and continuous feedback to maintain your participation in the study.

=== Educational counselor for people with disabilities ===
Solidarity figure that facilitates the learning of people who are in situations of disability, such as: visual, motor, auditory and language, mental and diseases that prevent the individual from mobilizing to carry out their studies.

=== Teaching Technician ===
Workers responsible for planning, organizing, coordinating, implementing, linking, implementing, supervising, promoting, disseminating, executing and monitoring the services offered by the INEA and IEEA, in the geographic tasks assigned to them, in accordance with the guidelines of operation and the Collective Bargaining Agreement.

== Educational program ==
Since 2005 the 'Educational Model for Life and Work' (MEVyT) is the educational program of the INEA (MEVyT) whose main purpose is to offer people a basic education related to topics and learning options, based on the needs and interests of the population to be served, in a way that helps them develop the knowledge and skills necessary to function in better conditions in their personal, family, work and social life, improve their quality of life and self-esteem, as well as the formation of attitudes of respect and responsibility.

The MEVyT is taught through basic and diversified modules that address different topics related to everyday life, also providing practicality to learning.

=== Slopes ===
==== MEVyT for Spanish Speakers ====
It concentrates most of the attention in the country. This aspect also serves Mexican communities abroad.

==== MEVyT 10-14 ====
It is a limited offer of the Spanish-speaking MEVyT that focuses on the characteristics and educational needs of children and young people between 10 and 14 years of age who could not complete their primary school due to health situations or confinement in social rehabilitation centers.

==== MEVyT Indígena Bilingüe (MIB) ====
The MIB is aimed at the speaking populations of the different indigenous languages (HLI), which takes into account the linguistic characteristics of the learners, especially for their literacy or initial level. The MIB is characterized by conducting literacy in the mother tongue, in order to make it easier to transfer that ability and encourages bilingual learning considering Spanish as a second language. For this reason, educational care must be carried out by local bilingual advisers, from literacy to high school. http://www.inea.gob.mx/index.php/inicio-portal-inea/mevyt/eadulmevytindbc.html

In 2011 this educational model won the King Sejong Award awarded by the United Nations Educational, Scientific and Cultural Organization (UNESCO), in literacy matter, in recognition of the efficiency in this area. The INEA obtained it for its bilingual literacy work in 42 indigenous communities in the country.

==== MEVyT for visually impaired ====
It is aimed at blind or visually impaired people who have not started or completed their primary or secondary education. It is an educational option with materials and support didactic strategies, adapted to its characteristics, which requires advice and adequate learning spaces so that they can start, continue or conclude their studies.

==== MEVyT online ====
The MEVyT online is the electronic modality of the MEVyT that allows you to study for free, primary or secondary. Its main characteristic is the ease of studying from a community plaza, your home, work, or any place that has a computer and Internet connection.

== Background of adult education ==
In Mexico, particularly after its independent life (1810), one of the constant concerns was to educate its inhabitants. The pedagogical methods of much of the eighteenth and nineteenth centuries had given priority to reading over writing, which is why the few people who had access to education, in many cases were able to read but not always to write. The heterogeneity of the country, both in race and in languages, coupled with a geography of difficult access and mobility, and other variables, meant that attempts to increase the number of Mexicans capable of reading, writing or doing accounts were always very limited. It was not until the 20th century, especially the 1920s, that literacy efforts achieved major triumphs.

{Quote | "In 1814, due to the democratic environment fostered by the Cortes of Cádiz, the first literacy school for older people was opened in Mexico, the Academy of First Letters for Adults […] The teacher Antonio Mateos taught two hours every night to the adults and hopes that they would learn to read in six months. "| Dorothy Tanck de Estrada, The Teaching of Reading in Mexico and of Writing in New Spain, 1700-1821 } }

=== During the Porfiriato (1876–1911) ===
Various efforts were made in favor of education, however, the high illiteracy rate (only 18% of the population was considered literate, according to data from the first population census of 1895); unstable economic conditions, derived from a recent past of internal wars and invasions; The norms and ideals that governed the roles that each man and woman should play according to their social stratum, among many other factors, were in many cases the impediment for those educational plans and programs not to reach the bulk of the population or to be circumscribed to the area of the urban centers of greater density, being a minority the one that was benefited. One of the relevant figures of the period was Justo Sierra Méndez, the first head of the Ministry of Public Instruction and Fine Arts (1905).

=== During the government of Álvaro Obregón (1920–1924) ===
The Secretary of Public Education, José Vasconcelos (1921–1924), was an important actor in the implementation and development of plans to educate the greatest number of Mexicans. Rural Schools and Cultural Missions were founded in order to offer education to indigenous workers and peasants excluded from regular services. In those years a great social mobilization took place. This effort is pointed out as the beginning, in form, of the literacy campaigns.

=== During the government of Manuel Ávila Camacho (1940–1946) ===
Different educational modalities were tried and being Jaime Torres Bodet, Secretary of Public Education (1943–1946), a literacy campaign was carried out similar to the one that Vasconcelos had previously undertaken. Laws on the matter were reformed and it was established that every person who could read had the obligation to teach someone who did not know.

In those years the Cultural Missions were reestablished, the constant reformulation of the laws relating to education to combat illiteracy, the creation of the General Directorate of Literacy and Extracurricular Education, the precision regarding the permanent nature of the literacy campaigns, as well as the creation of boarding schools, brigades, promotion communities and the Office of the Indigenous Affairs Procurator, beginning the development of a methodology and the elaboration of materials in the different indigenous languages, in order to extend literacy to this population.

At the end of the 1940s, the National Indigenous Institute was created as a consultative group that was to advise the federal government. In the same period, Mexico participated in the constitution of the United Nations Educational, Scientific and Cultural Organization (UNESCO) and with its support two projects were carried out: the "Basic Education Pilot Test" and the creation of the Regional Cooperation Center for Adult Education in Latin America and the Caribbean (CREFAL), based in Pátzcuaro, Michoacán, in 1950.

=== During the government of Adolfo López Mateos (1958–1964) ===
The "11 Year Plan" was created and a primer was drawn up to make children and adults literate indistinctly, with the aim of teaching basic knowledge in a simple way. In this period the Free Textbook is instituted. For the first time, the media are participating in support of education, through radio and television programs.

=== During the government of Gustavo Díaz Ordaz (1964–1970) ===
A new literacy campaign was carried out that gave priority to the education of illiterate children and children under 15 years of age; Adults up to 50 years of age were left in the background.

=== During the government of Luis Echeverría Álvarez (1970–1976) ===
The Federal Education Law (1973) was drafted where the definition of education as an institution of the common good was adopted and the national educational system was organized to establish new bases that promoted the rights of all the country's inhabitants to receive education. The Ministry of Public Education through the General Directorate of Educational Planning promotes the open system among adults. This proposal was in charge of the Center for the Study of Advanced Means and Procedures of Education (CEMPAE) where the materials for the Primary Intensive for Adults (PRIAD) were developed. In 1975, the National Law on Adult Education was enacted, which regulates the education of individuals over 15 years of age who have not completed or completed primary or secondary school. This education was conceived as an out-of-school education, based on self-taught teaching and social solidarity.

=== During the government of José López Portillo (1976–1982) ===
In 1978, the lawyer Fernando Solana started the project called "Education for All" whose objective was to assure all Mexicans the use of the alphabet and basic education to improve their quality of life for themselves. The project comprised three specific programs: Primary for all children; Castellanization and Adult Education. Although adult education was a priority during the first years of the six-year term, the results were few significant, so in April 1981 the National Literacy Program (PRONALF) was launched. literacy training "The Generating Word", based on the ideas and proposals of Paulo Freire. On the other hand, the post-literacy stage was also monitored by giving written materials to adults and attempts were made to initiate them in an open primary program.

== Documentation center ==
In order to provide its staff with information, consultation, and dissemination of educational material services, in 1982, the National Institute for Adult Education (INEA) established a documentation center. In its beginnings, the documentation center was constituted with a collection of two thousand titles referring to literacy and primary education for young people and adults, as well as other documents on various fields of knowledge.

When the Center for the Study of Advanced Means and Procedures of Education (CEMPAE) disappeared "most of its collection was transferred to the Institute, increasing by just over 17 thousand volumes." With the CEMPAE donation, the collection that housed the center diversified, which allowed the development of a general collection and the creation of a specialized collection in adult education, where the first edition of the Primary Intensive for Adults (PRIAD) materials came out, coordinated by Rosa Luz Alegría, as well as the series, collections and materials published by the INEA Through its more than 34 years of functions.

In 1997, as a posthumous tribute to the death of the Brazilian pedagogue Paulo Freire, the documentation center adopted his name. Currently the 'Documentation Center "Paulo Freire"' has more than 20,000 volumes, a significant number of which correspond to adult education and the rest to works on literature, art, geography and history.

== Acknowledgments ==
Since its creation to date, the INEA has been awarded various national and international recognitions:

- In 1986 the United Nations Educational, Scientific and Cultural Organization (UNESCO) awarded him the medal "One million literate Mexicans" and the honorable mention of the Nadezhda K. Krups Kaya award, which is awarded to projects and activities in the field of literacy.
- While in 1988 his television series "El que saber ... sabe" and "Aprendamos altogether" were awarded the Aztec Calendar of Gold, awarded by the Mexican Association of Radio and Television Journalism (CAMPRYT).
- In 1997, UNESCO awarded him the Noma Prize, for his work in coordination with the government of the state of Hidalgo, since through the State Literacy Crusade more than 200 thousand adults were served.
- In 2002 he was awarded the INNOVA Recognition, which is awarded to agencies and entities of the Federal government for their advances in innovation and improvement in the quality of the service they offer, in this case the use of technology implemented in the Community Plazas project.
- In 2008 the INEA obtained the Recognition for the Improvement of Management that the Ministry of Public Education (SEP) granted it for the technological innovation applied to students who seek to complete an educational level through the Automated Monitoring and Accreditation System (SASA) in Line.
- In the same year, the government of the Republic of Chile considered the Automated Monitoring and Accreditation System (SASA) in terms of online exams.
- In 2009, the National Institute for Adult Education obtained ISO 9001 certification from the ATR American certifying body
- In 2010, the Presidency of the Republic, through the Ministry of Public Education (SEP), awarded the prize to the Improvement of Management to the INEA for the contributions of the Automated Monitoring and Accreditation System (SASA). That same year, the INEA obtained the recognition of the "Best Educational Portal" granted by the Presidency for all the facilities it provides for consultation and use by users.
- In 2011, the National Institute for Adult Education received an Honorable Mention from the National Council for the Evaluation of Social Development Policy (CONEVAL), for the implementation of good practices in public administration, continuously monitoring the formation of the personnel who carry out some activity in the institute.
- For 2011, the United Nations Educational, Scientific and Cultural Organization (UNESCO) awarded INEA the King Sejong Prize for the bilingual literacy programs offered through the Education for Life and Education Model. Bilingual Indigenous Work (MIB). That same year, the Diagnostic Assessment Project and the Automated Training Register (RAF) were recognized with Honorable Mention by the National Council for the Evaluation of Social Development Policy (Coneval).

== Directors ==
Director	Period
Miguel Alonzo Calles	October 1, 1981 – January 30, 1984
Fernando Rosenzweig Hernández	February 1, 1984 – October 15, 1985
Fernando Zertuche Muñoz	October 16, 1985 – November 30, 1988
Fernando Pérez Correa	December, 1988 – December 31, 1993
Filiberto Cepeda Tijerina	January 1 – December 31, 1994
Javier López Moreno	January 1, 1995 – January, 1996
José Antonio Carranza Palacios	January 1, 1996 – April 30, 2001
Ramón de la Peña Manrique	May 1, 2001 – April 30, 2006
Ciro Adolfo Suárez Martínez	April 1, 2006 – December 12, 2006
María Dolores del Río Sánchez	December 13, 2006 – August 20, 2008
Juan de Dios Castro Muñoz	February 1, 2009 – January, 2013
José Regino López Acosta	2013
María de los Ángeles Errisúriz	2013
Alfredo Llorente Martínez	July 8, 2013 – January, 2016
Mauricio López Velazquez	January 6, 2016 – February, 2018
Gerardo Molina Álvarez	February 7, 2018 – November 30, 2018
Marcos Augusto Bucio Mújica	December 1, 2018 – March 15, 2019
Rodolfo Lara Ponte	July 22, 2019 – March 15, 2021
Teresa Guadalupe Reyes Sahagún	
