= Benamarías =

- Minor local entity
- Location within Province of León Location within Castile and León Location within Spain
- Coordinates: 42°32′37″N 6°5′27″W
- Country: Spain
- Autonomous community: Castile and León
- Province: Province of León
- Municipality: Magaz de Cepeda
- Elevation: 914 m (2,999 ft)

Population
  - Total: 45

Benamarías is a locality and minor local entity located in the municipality of Magaz de Cepeda, in the province of León, Castile and León, Spain. As of 2020, it has a population of 45.

== Geography ==
Benamarías is located 66km west of León, Spain.
