= Vega de Magaz =

- Minor local entity
- Location within Province of León Location within Castile and León Location within Spain
- Coordinates: 42°32′59″N 6°4′14″W
- Country: Spain
- Autonomous community: Castile and León
- Province: Province of León
- Municipality: Magaz de Cepeda
- Elevation: 901 m (2,956 ft)

Population
  - Total: 103

Vega de Magaz is a locality and minor local entity located in the municipality of Magaz de Cepeda, in the province of León, Castile and León, Spain. As of 2020, it has a population of 103.

== Geography ==
Vega de Magaz is located 60km west of León, Spain.
