= Porqueros =

- Minor local entity
- Location within Province of León Location within Castile and León Location within Spain
- Coordinates: 42°35′59″N 6°6′34″W
- Country: Spain
- Autonomous community: Castile and León
- Province: Province of León
- Municipality: Magaz de Cepeda
- Elevation: 959 m (3,146 ft)

Population
  - Total: 53

Porqueros is a locality and minor local entity located in the municipality of Magaz de Cepeda, in the province of León, Castile and León, Spain. As of 2020, it has a population of 53.

== Geography ==
Porqueros is located 68km west of León, Spain.
