= La Carrera de Otero =

La Carrera
- Minor local entity
- Location within Province of León Location within Castile and León Location within Spain
- Coordinates: 42°30′36″N 6°2′37″W
- Country: Spain
- Autonomous community: Castile and León
- Province: Province of León
- Municipality: Villaobispo de Otero
- Elevation: 877 m (2,877 ft)

Population
  - Total: 122

La Carrera is a locality and minor local entity located in the municipality of Villaobispo de Otero, in León province, Castile and León, Spain. As of 2020, it has a population of 122.

== Geography ==
La Carrera is located 53km west-southwest of León, Spain.
