= Tamara De Anda =

Mexican blogger and journalist

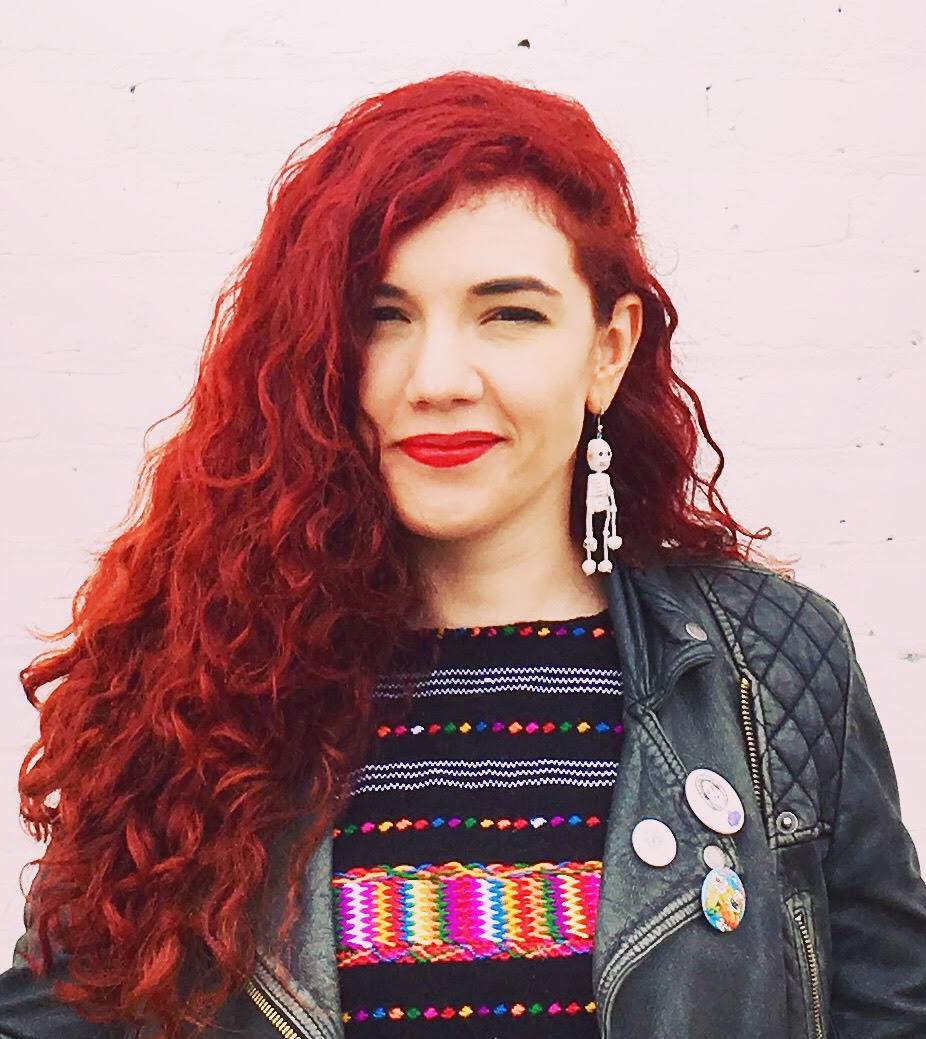
- De Anda in 2017
- Born: Tamara De Anda Prieto; August 6, 1983 (age 43); Mexico City, Mexico
- Education: National Autonomous University of Mexico
- Occupation: Journalist
- Known for: BBC's 100 Women (2017)

Tamara De Anda Prieto (born August 6, 1983 in Mexico City, Mexico), also known by her pen name Plaqueta, is a Mexican blogger and journalist. She received international attention after an incident of harassment involving a taxi driver, and was subsequently the target of online harassment and trolls. She previously blogged for El Universal, and published the 2018 book #Amigadatecuenta, along with fellow activist Andrea Arsuaga. In 2017 she was named among BBC's 100 Women.

== Biography ==
De Anda studied communications at the National Autonomous University of Mexico.

In 2013, De Anda posted to social media about an Aeroméxico casting call that had been sent to her. It stated that people with dark skin (morenos) would not be allowed to audition for roles, and that they wanted only actors of "'a white complexion' and a 'Polanco look'". (Note: "Polanco" here being a reference to Polanco, Mexico City, a mostly white and affluent neighborhood) Aeroméxico later apologized when Mexican news outlets wrote about her tweets.

In 2017, a male taxi driver catcalled De Anda, whistling and calling "Eh, guapa", literally "hey beautiful". This escalated into a heated exchange, until De Anda reported the man to a passing police officer. The taxi driver was fined. He refused to pay and instead chose to spend a night in jail. The incident received international coverage when her tweets about the event went viral. Since the incident, she has received both death and rape threats. In a joint statement to the 38th meeting of the United Nations Human Rights Council, Amnesty International, Association for Women's Rights in Development, and others identified the criticism, mockery, and "threats of physical aggression, sexual content and sexist jokes" directed toward De Anda as "emblematic of a broader trend" of online harassment of women human rights defenders.

In the days following the Westminster attack and the later the Manchester Arena bombing pictures of Anda circulated on social media posts claiming that she was a victim of the attacks. At the time of the attack, De Anda was in Mexico City participating in a Facebook Live interview with the New York Times. She stated that this was a form of harassment, by internet trolls, retaliating against her, for her actions toward the taxi driver. Speaking with the British newspaper i:

I’ve been the target of Mexican trolls for days since I made a street harasser pay a fine. This is their new attack. It was special and newsworthy because in Mexico the authorities always dismiss women's version and harassers and even murderers never get any kind of punishment. And nobody knows the law. So I ‘discovered’ this way of proceeding, which is simpler, and I cannot believe something so, I don't know, ‘small’ is a big deal. But it is. I broke Mexican internet.

Anda wrote a blog for El Universal until 2017. She has also worked as a reporter for Canal Once, host of the show Radio Formula, and been a contributor to the website Maspormas.

She was listed as one of BBC's 100 Women during 2017 and was a part of an anti-harassment campaign in Mexico City.

In 2018 she and fellow activist Andrea Arsuaga published #Amigadatecuenta, a book about feminism and women's health.

== Selected publications ==
- De Anda, Tamara (September 19, 2011). "Nuestra violencia México (in Spanish)". Gatopardo.
- De Anda, Tamara (January 10, 2018). "In Transit: Mexico City". Anthony Bourdain: Parts Unknown.
- Andonella; Plaqueta (August 23, 2018). #Amigadatecuenta. Grupo Planeta – México. ISBN 978-607-07-5129-5.

== See also ==
- Feminism in Mexico
- List of Mexican women writers
- Violence against women in Mexico
- Women in Mexico
