= Cepeda la Mora =

- municipality
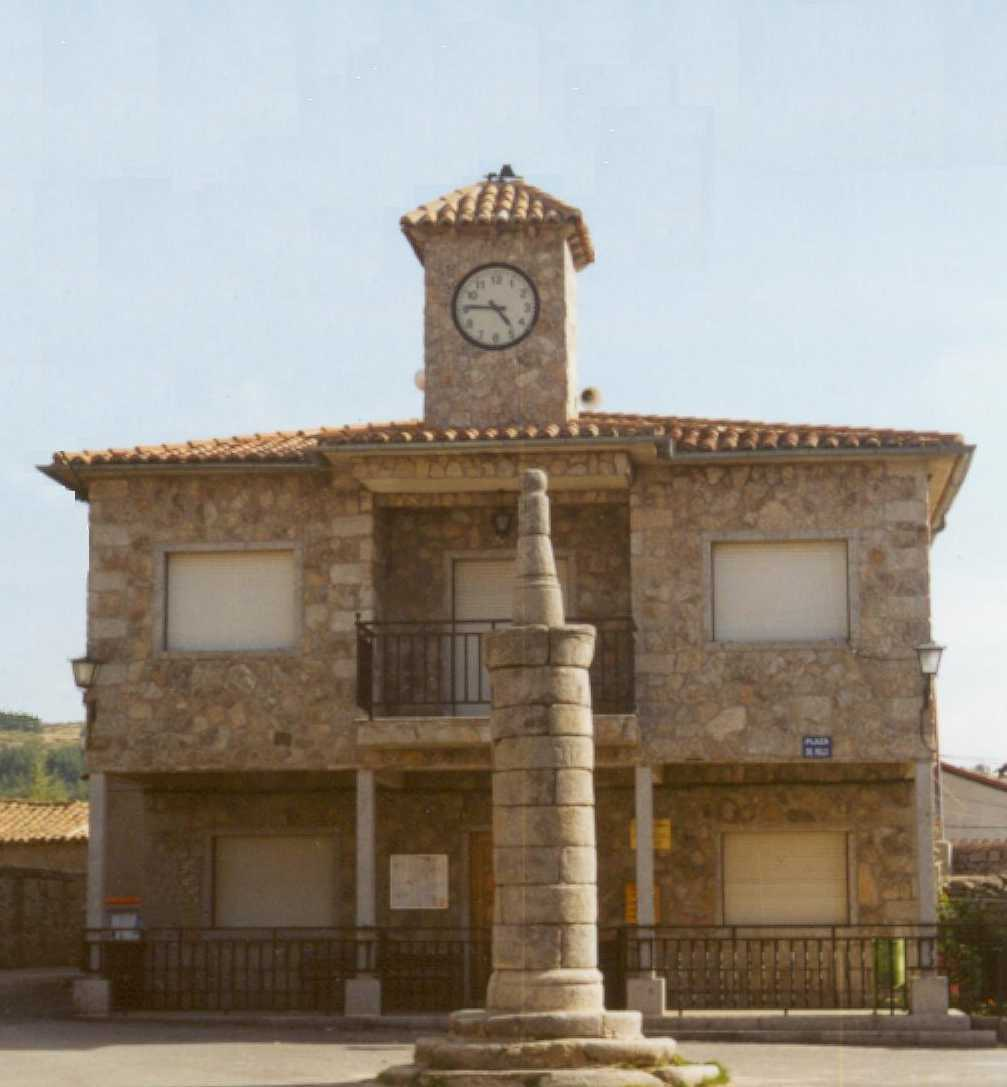
- Town hall

- Flag Coat of arms

- Location in Spain. Cepeda la Mora (Spain)
- Coordinates: 40°27′28″N 5°02′54″W
- Country: Spain
- Autonomous community: Castile and León
- Province: Ávila
- Municipality: Cepeda la Mora

Government
  - mayor: Eduardo Montes González

Area
  - Total: 31 km^{2} (12 sq mi)
- Elevation: 1,504 m (4,934 ft)

Population (2025-01-01)
  - Total: 63
  - Density: 2.0/km^{2} (5.3/sq mi)
- Time zone: UTC+1 (CET)
  - Summer (DST): UTC+2 (CEST)
- Website: Official website

Cepeda de la Mora is a town located in the province of Ávila within the autonomous community of Castile-Leon in north-western Spain.

Cepeda de la Mora is located in Spain's Natural Space La Serrota in the proximities of the Sierra de Gredos Regional Park.

Cepeda de la Mora at 1,504 metres is the 6th highest, by altitude above sea level, in the province of Ávila and the 12th highest in Spain.

== Population ==
Historical population
Year	Pop.	±% p.a.
2023	67	—
2024	66	−1.49%
2025	63	−4.55%
Source: INE
