= Santiago Cepeda =

Colombian poet and novelist

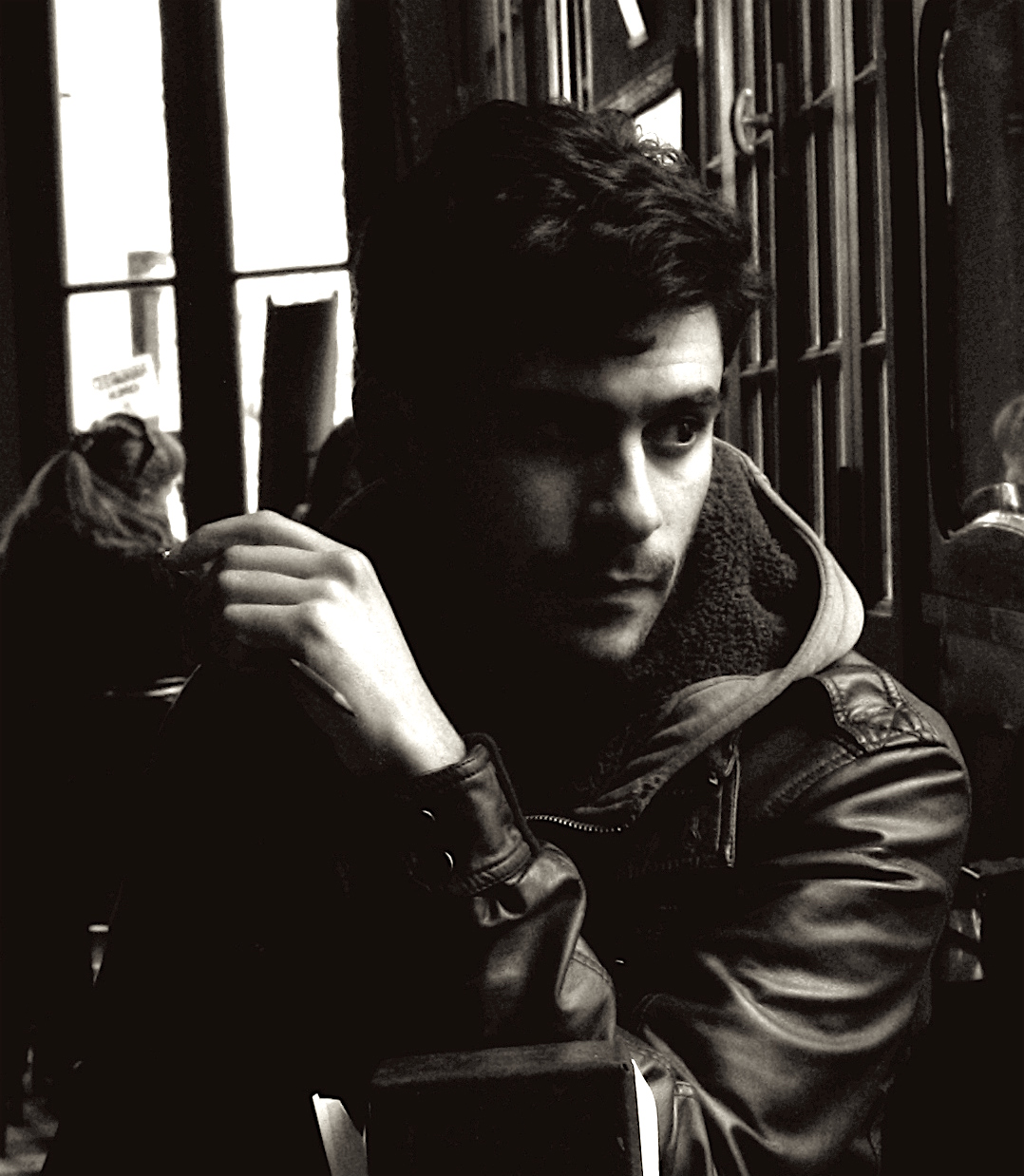
- Born: 31 March 1986 (age 40); Bogotá D.C., Colombia
- Education: Universidad Javeriana, NYU
- Occupations: Writer, journalist, literature teacher
- Writing career
- Language: Spanish
- Notable awards: National Poetry Award for Unpublished Work 2010, Embassy of Spain-Colsanitas Young Novel Award 2010.
- Website: Santiago Cepeda's Official Site.

Santiago Cepeda (Bogotá, 1986) is a Colombian poet and novelist.

He received his bachelor's degree in literature from the Pontificia Universidad Javeriana in 2010. Also in 2010, Cepeda won the Premio Nacional de Poesía Obra Inédita (National Poetry Award for Unpublished Work) with the book Arder no ha sido luz (To Burn Has Not Been Light). Later that year, Cepeda obtained the first place of the Premio de Novela Joven Embajada de España-Colsanitas (Embassy of Spain-Colsanitas Young Novel Award) for the novel Revelado (Blown up). He was given a Fulbright scholarship in 2014 to do an MFA in creative writing in Spanish at NYU. He returned to Bogotá in 2015. Since then he has been working as a creative writing teacher for several universities.

== Bibliography ==
=== Novels ===
- Revelado (Blown Up). Ed. Planeta, Colombia, 2010. ISBN 9789584481269.

=== Poetry ===
- "Arder no ha sido luz" ("To Burn Has Not Been Light"). Ed. Tertulia Literaria de Gloria Luz Gutiérrez, Colombia, 2011. ISBN 9789584225023.

=== Children's books ===
- "Deshojando" ("Defoliating"), with Jose Arboleda. Authors Edition, Colombia, 2011. ISBN 9789584497024
