= Carolina Amor de Fournier =

Mexican editor, writer and translator

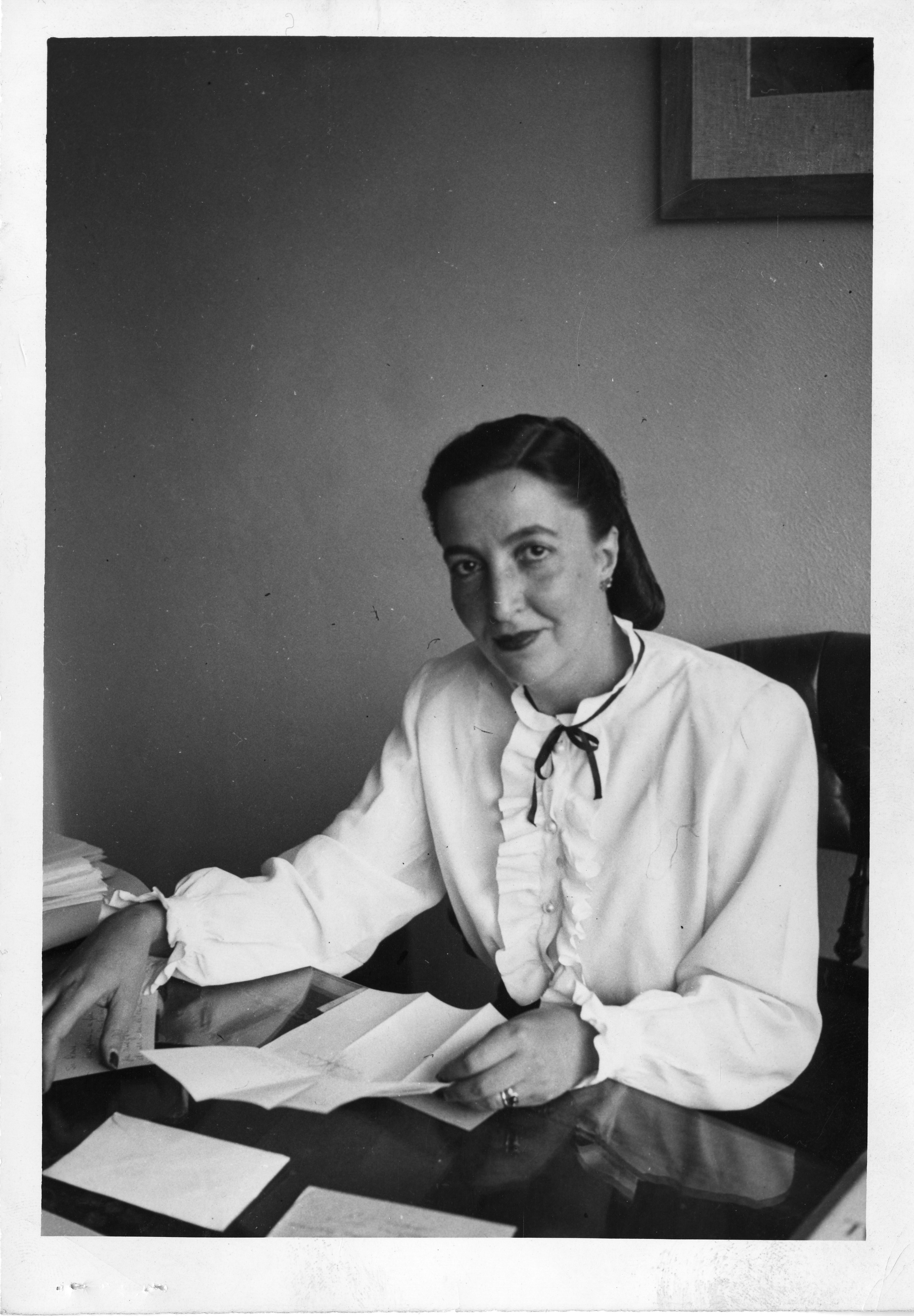
Carolina Amor de Fournier

Carolina Amor de Fournier (1908–1993) was a Mexican editor, writer and translator. She was a founder of the Mexican scientific publishing company, La Prensa Médica Mexicana, and for many years, served as its director and editor. She was also co-founder in 1965 of Siglo XXI Editores. In 1980, she received the Merito Editorial. Born in Mexico City, her parents were Carolina Schmidtlein y García Teruel (of German and Spanish origin) and Emmanuel Amor Subervielle (of Spanish and French origin). Amor had six siblings. Her sister, Guadalupe Amor, was a poet, her sister, Inés Amor an important Mexican galerist and her niece, Elena Poniatowska Amor, was a writer. Amor died in Mexico City.

== Selected works ==
- Carolina Amor de Fournier; Carlos Campillo Sáinz. 1987. A la memoria del Doctor Raoul Rournier Villada, 1900-1984.
- Andres J. Cassidy; Luz María A. de Chapa; Carolina Amor de Fournier. 1982. "Es un privilegio ser amigo del Señor ...": recopilación de homilías.
- Carolina Amor de Fournier. 1972. La mujer en la tipografía mexicana.
- Carolina Amor de Fournier. 1972. El niño de 6 a 12 años.
- Carolina Amor de Fournier. 1965. Medicina interna.
- Carolina Amor de Fournier, Rafael Montes de Oca; Rafael Martín del Campo, Rorman Pelham Wright. 1963. Hummingbirds and orchids of Mexico : Monografia de los colibries y apuntes sobre las principales orquidea de México.
- Carolina Amor de Fournier. 1954. Catálogo de libros impresos en México: VI Feria mexicana del libro.

== Sources ==
- Claudia Albarrán, Juan Antonio Rosado, Angélica Tornero. 2004. Diccionario de literatura mexicana: siglo XX. Vol. 19 de Filosofía y Cultura Contemporánea. 2ª edición de UNAM, 530 pp. ISBN 9703217605, ISBN 9789703217601
