= Alice-Leone Moats =

Mexican-American writer

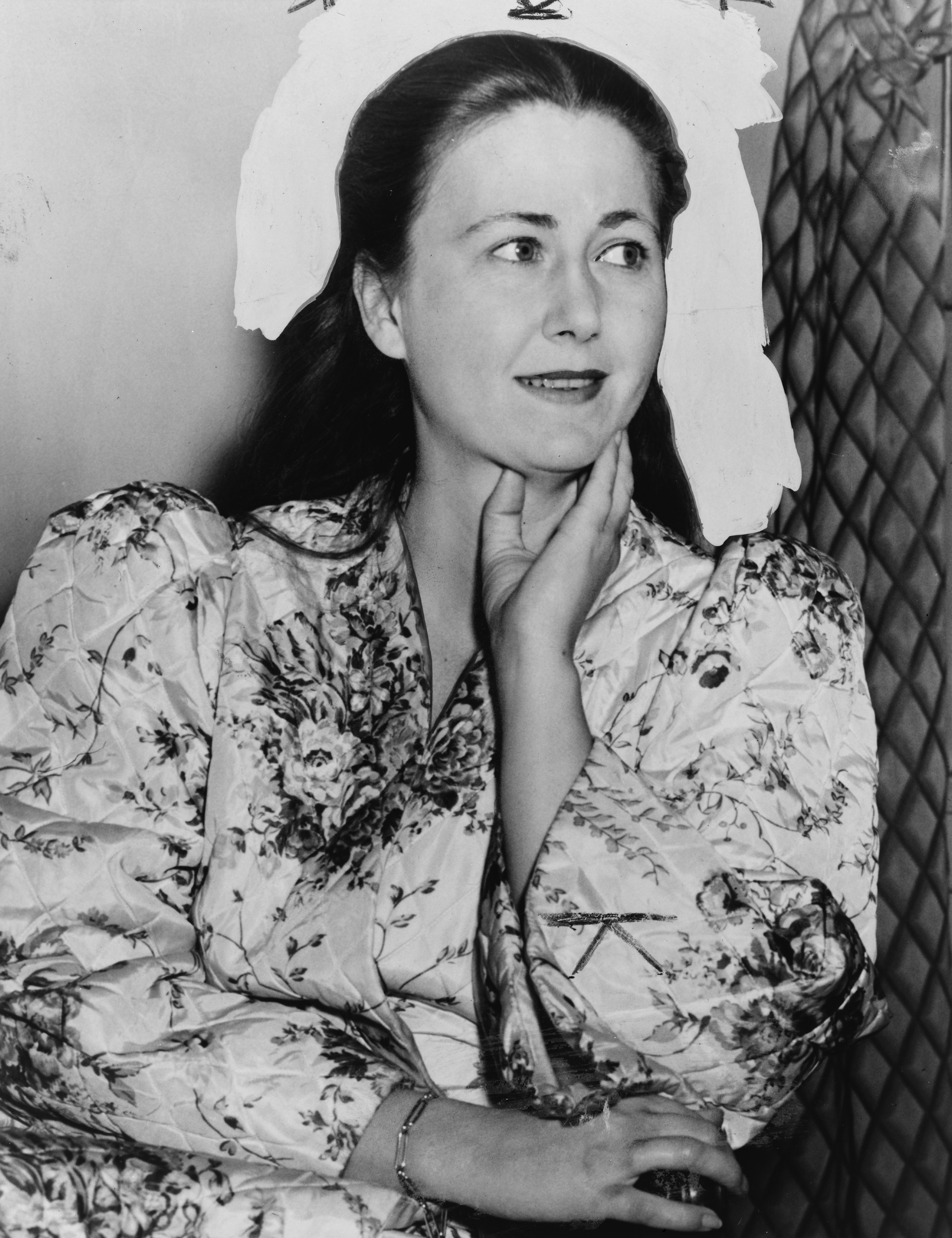
- Moats in 1942
- Born: 1908; Mexico City
- Died: 1989 (aged 80–81); Philadelphia
- Writing career
- Notable work: No Nice Girl Swears

Alice-Leone Moats (1908–1989) was an American journalist and author who was born in Mexico to wealthy and socially prominent American parents. She attended convent schools in Mexico City, Rome and Paris, as well as the Brearley School in Manhattan and the Fermata School for Girls in Aiken, South Carolina.

== Early life ==
Moats was born in Mexico to American parents. She was the only child. Her family were rich and lived in luxury. Moats grew up in a family with servants. Her father was a businessman who owned a lumber business in Mexico City. Her mother made her learn five languages as a child. Moats enrolled at the Brearley School in New York as a ten-year-old, later moving on to schools in Rome and Paris.

Moats completed high school in Mexico and at the Fermata School in Aiken, S.C. She then got admission into Oxford University. However, her stay at Oxford lasted only three days.

== Career ==
Moats began her writing career in 1933 when she was commissioned to write No Nice Girl Swears, a somewhat tongue-in-cheek book of etiquette. She then served as a foreign correspondent for Collier's magazine in Japan, China, the Soviet Union, and other countries. In 1943 she used these experiences to write her favorite book, Blind Date with Mars, about a journey through the Far East.

In 1944, the State Department cancelled her passport as she had travelled to Vichy-controlled France, and under war-time regulations it was illegal to travel to enemy-controlled territory.

She later became a columnist for The Philadelphia Inquirer. A political conservative, and Roman Catholic, she contributed to the National Review in the 1960s.

After several decades of reporting, traveling to countries that were war zones, and writing nine books and hundreds of magazine articles, Moats limiting her writing in her last decade to a column she wrote for the Commentary page of The Inquirer. The column was a huge hit. Many newspapers syndicated her columns. She used her acerbic, witty, and disposed style to cover topics such as international politics or profiling a simple civil servant she met.

Although she wrote quite frequently on political issues, Moats did not like to be hemmed in by choosing between Democrat and Republican. Even in her last column she criticized the feminists of her country for failing to rally behind U.S. Sen. Nancy Kassebaum, who had voted against the appointment of John Tower as secretary of defense. The author of a book entitled No Nice Girl Swears was stubborn, argumentative, and uncompromisingly honest.

Though she claimed to have been engaged eight times, Moats never married.

== Works ==
=== Books ===
According to the Library of Congress catalog, Moats wrote:

- No Nice Girl Swears (1933)
- Off to Mexico (1935)
- Blind Date With Mars (1943)
- No Passport for Paris (1945)
- Violent Innocence (1951)
- At Home Abroad (1954)
- Lupescu (1955)
- Roman Folly (1965)
- Million Dollar Studs (1977)Million Dollar Studs (1978)

=== Articles ===
- "Britain's Best Bet: Meet the new ambassador," Collier's Weekly (1940)
- "Beware, Honorable Spy!" Collier's Weekly (1941)
- "Courage to Burn" (review of The Russian Guerrilla), Collier's Weekly (1941)
- "She Lives in Fear," American Weekly (1952)
- "The Strange Past of Fidel Castro," National Review (1957)
- "Gomulka's Poland," National Review (1959)
- "The Riddle of Pope Paul VI," National Review (1963)
- "Can Anyone Free Cardinal Mindszenty," National Review (1963)
- "The Confession," National Review (1969)
- "Giscard at the Helm," National Review (1974)
