= Elena Zelayeta =

Mexican American restaurant owner and television show host

- Born: October 3, 1898; Mexico City
- Died: March 31, 1974 (aged 75); San Mateo
- Occupation: Restaurant manager, cookbook writer, television presenter

Elena Zelayeta (October 3, 1898 – March 31, 1974) was a Mexican American cookbook author. After running a restaurant in San Francisco with her husband, Zelayeta lost her vision, but she relearned how to cook and went on to greater success. Her first book, Elena's Famous Spanish and Mexican Recipes (1944), made her "a national sensation for decades" according to the Los Angeles Times. Zelayeta was the first Latina American with a televised cooking show when she starred in It's Fun to Eat, broadcast throughout California.

== Biography ==
Elena Emilia Zelayeta was born October 3, 1898, in Mexico City. Her parents were Spanish immigrants and innkeepers in a small mining town in Mexico. The family fled Mexico after the Mexican Revolution, moving to San Francisco when Elena was eleven.

As a young woman, Zelayeta worked at the California Arms Company. Both she and her husband, Loren, lost their jobs in 1930 due to The Great Depression, losing their home and having their car repossessed. Out of desperation they began selling homemade Mexican and Spanish meals out of their living room, which quickly turned into a successful business. The couple opened a restaurant, Elena's Mexican Village, in a luxury hotel in San Francisco. Murals depicted Mexican life, waitresses wore Mexican costumes, and Zelayeta performed on castanets on Thursday and Sunday evenings.

Just before giving birth to her second child, Zelayeta learned she was going blind due to retinal detachment; the restaurant closed, and she sunk into a depression. She relearned to cook using her other senses, and began to again host dinners in her own house. The San Francisco Center for the Blind asked Zelayeta to teach a cooking class; students urged her to write a cookbook, which she did in order to raise money for her first guide dog.

In the introduction to her 1944 book, Elena's Famous Mexican And Spanish Recipes, Zelayeta included both traditional Mexican dishes and American adaptations. The book sold well and led to additional book deals; her final cookbook, published in 1967, featured a foreword by James Beard, who wrote "Elena is a traditionalist, but she can also pull an inspired new combination of foods out of the air―and make you feel it is the most authentic dish you ever ate".

In 1950 she became the first Latina American with a televised cooking show when she filmed a series of television episodes titled "'It's Fun to Eat' with Elena." Her eleven-year-old son, Billy, was her cooking assistant on the show. Strings were attached to her ankles on set, and stagehands would pull on a string to let her know to turn from one camera to another. Professor of cinema studies Dana Polan writes that the show was "in between in its subject matter": "satisfying American culinary tastes and yet also opening them up to new culinary horizons; in between in the mix of its quite ordinary, even quite minimalist style (or non-style) and the stand out appeal of a distinctive host who, although blind, could still play well to the cameras and foster a sense of personality and intimacy".

Zelayeta was named the 1963 California Mother of the Year by the State American Mothers Committee. Norman Vincent Peale wrote about attending a 17-course dinner at Zelayeta's home in his 2003 book The Amazing Results of Positive Thinking, saying about her, "this inspiring woman is one of the most marvelous examples of positive thinking I have ever ran across."

She died in San Mateo on March 31, 1974.

== Bibliography ==
- Elena's famous Mexican and Spanish recipes. San Francisco : Dettners Printing House, 1944
- Elena's lessons in living / as told to Lou Richardson. San Francisco : Elena Zelayeta, 1947
- Elena's fiesta recipes. Los Angeles : Ward Ritchie Press, 1952
- Elena's secrets of Mexican cooking. Englewood Cliffs, N.J. : Prentice-Hall, 1958
- Elena. Englewood Cliffs, N.J. : Prentice-Hall, 1960
- Elena's favorite foods: California style. Englewood Cliffs, N.J. : Prentice-Hall, 1967
