= Natividad Cepeda =

Spanish poet, writer, and columnist

Natividad Cepeda was born in Tomelloso (Ciudad Real), Spain. She is a Spanish poet, writer and habitual columnist in the Castilla-La Mancha press (Lanza, Las Provincias, El Periódico del Común de La Mancha, La Tribuna, Pasos, etc.) and in literary magazines (El Cardo de Bronce, La Alcazaba, etc.) that has been publishing in Spain and Latinoamerica from 1970. Natividad Cepeda's formative influences were Valentin Arteaga, Spanish classic poets and Latino American poets like Pablo Neruda.
