= Villaobispo de Otero =

Coordinates: 42°30′N 6°03′W

- municipality
- Flag Coat of arms

- Country: Spain
- Autonomous community: Castile and León
- Province: León
- Municipality: Villaobispo de Otero

Area
  - Total: 31 km^{2} (12 sq mi)

Population (2025-01-01)
  - Total: 514
  - Density: 17/km^{2} (43/sq mi)
- Time zone: UTC+1 (CET)
  - Summer (DST): UTC+2 (CEST)

Villaobispo de Otero is a municipality located in the province of León, Castile and León, Spain. According to the 2004 census (INE), the municipality has a population of 665 inhabitants.

Villaobispo is part of the historical region of La Cepeda.

== Villages ==
- Brimeda
- Carneros
- La Carrera de Otero
- Otero de Escarpizo
- Sopeña de Carneros
- Villaobispo
