= Sandra Rodríguez Nieto =

Mexican journalist

- Education: Autonomous University of Chihuahua, University of Texas at El Paso
- Occupations: Journalist, investigative reporter
- Organization(s): El Diario de Juárez, Sin Embargo
- Known for: Investigating the Mexican drug war

Sandra Rodríguez Nieto is a Mexican journalist who for many years was an investigative reporter for El Diario de Juárez. She has aggressively covered the narcotics-connected violence in Ciudad Juárez, which is located across the border from El Paso, Texas, and which is one of the most violent cities in the world.

She has won several international awards for her groundbreaking reporting about the narcotics trade and other subjects. She is now a reporter for Sin Embargo.

== Early life and education ==
Rodríguez studied communication sciences at the Autonomous University of Chihuahua in Juárez and holds a master's degree in journalism from the University of Texas at El Paso.

== Career ==
From 2003 to 2012, she worked for El Diario in the northern border city of Juárez, where she wrote extensively about corruption in local government, the weaknesses in the judicial system, the structure and activities of drug cartels, and the involvement of disenfranchised local youth in criminal gangs and the narcotics trade.

Her analysis of murders in Juárez in 2008 and 2009 showed that most of the victims were young people from the poorest neighbourhoods, not drug cartel members, as Mexican officials claimed, and that 98 percent of the victims were unarmed and 97 percent of the killings unsolved.

She now writes for Sin Embargo.

=== Books ===
She is the author of the 2012 book La Fábrica del Crimen (The Crime Factory). In the book, she denounces the “perverse cycle that has led to social deterioration--and the lose of entire generations of young people – in Ciudad Juárez.” José Luis Benavides, journalism professor at California State University, Northridge, has said that “[h]er book, like no other recent book written about Juárez, adds layers of understanding that make the reader appreciate the complexities of the problem, moving away from facile explanations and solutions advanced by government officials on both sides of the border.”

== Honors and awards ==
In 2010, the Spanish newspaper El Mundo awarded her the Reporteros Del Mundo prize. Also in 2010, she was included on the Los Angeles Times’ list of Media Heroes. In 2011, she received the Knight International Journalism Award from the International Center for Journalists, with El Diario staff, the Maria Moors Cabot Award from Columbia University, and received the title of Honorary Citizen of Genoa.

In recognition of her coverage for the newspaper El Diario de Juárez, she received the 2013 Daniel Pearl Award for Outstanding International Investigative Reporting.

She was a Harvard University Nieman Fellow in 2014. She was the only Latin American in that year's class of 24 reporters and editors. At Harvard she studied “ways to develop sustainable online investigative and narrative journalism projects with a focus on government transparency and accountability in Mexico.”

== Views ==
In Juárez, she has written, “murderers can act with freedom and anonymity, enjoying the indifference and complicity of the state. Citizens, meanwhile, are left vulnerable, not knowing how to defend ourselves and from whom.” She has concluded that “the supposed remedy ‘against drugs’ is at least 100 times worse than the supposed ills of consumption, with the added aggravation that forbidding the trade fuels corruption in state institutions. The resulting social deterioration in places like Juárez leads to extreme criminality and out-of-control carnage.”

== Public appearances ==
She has lectured about the Mexican drug war in various venues. In November 2012, she spoke at California State University, Northridge. In February 2014 she spoke at Stony Brook University in New York. “The whole city is a battlefield,” she said of Juárez at Stony Brook. “In 2008, [Juárez] became this battlefield for drug cartels who wanted to control the distribution routes of trucks. The federal government sent 8,000 troops. It was the first time I’ve seen soldiers in my city.” She added: “My worst nightmare is to someday wake up and see the story of my city in the New York Times. No. I’m not gonna let any foreign reporter to tell the story of the city that I know because I know what is underneath the violence.”
