= Francisco Cepeda =

Francisco Cepeda (Zepeda, Zepedas) (born in the province of La Mancha, Spain, 1532; died at Guatemala, 1602) was a Spanish Dominican missionary.

He became a Dominican at the convent of Ocaña, and was sent to Chiapas in Mexico. He was a very active missionary among the Indians. When differing modes of instructing them became an obstacle to their conversion, Cepeda was sent to Mexico to simplify the Indian grammars printed there, and obtain a standard for the guidance of the missionaries.

Cepeda became Provincial of the Dominicans in Guatemala, 1593, and Commissary of the Inquisition.

== Works ==
The Artes de los idiomas Chiapanecos, Zoque, Tzendal y Chinanteco (probably the work of several authors) was published in 1560 under his name. The book no longer survives, but its former existence is well established, by Antonio de Remesal at first, and by subsequent authors. It was the first book printed in America in four languages (five with the Spanish). The title is given variously, but the above is the correct one.
