= Susana Pagano =

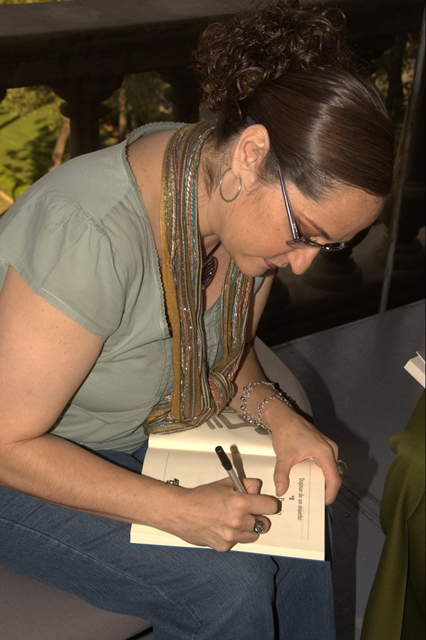
Pagano autographs a book at an event at the Monterrey Institute of Technology and Higher Education, Mexico City.

Susana Pagano (born 1968 in Mexico) is a narrator, and an author of various novels and short stories.

== Biography ==
Susana Pagano studied at the Sociedad General de Escritores de Mexico (SOGEM), the Mexican writers’ guild and one of the oldest schools of creative writing in Mexico. She is also an alumna of the Instituto Cultural Helenico in Mexico City and the University of Barcelona in Spain. Mexico's Fondo Nacional para la Cultura y las Artes – the National Council For the Culture and Arts, an equivalent of the National endowment for the Arts – made her the recipient of the Young Creators Fellowship in 1996. Her works have been published in various magazines and cultural supplements.

Pagano's debut novel was Y si yo fuera Susana San Juan… (What if I were Susana San Juan…) - published in 1998 and 2006 by Fondo Editorial Tierra Adentro. It received the National award Premio Nacional de Novela Jose Ruben Romero in 1995.

With her second novel “Trajinar de un Muerto” (Oceano, 2001), Pagano confirms and enhances her writing style while showing us that sometimes the deceased not only do not rest in peace, but often are among us and behave worse than the living.

One of her stories, "La Liga del Gineceo" appeared in the 2005 anthology Un Hombre a la Medida (Cal y Arena, 2005).

== Published works ==
- “A la Orilla del Puente” (short story), Unomasuno Saturday supplement, 1992.
- “Acuerdate del Real” (short story), Unomasuno Saturday supplement, 1992.
- “Madre de Dios o Diosa Azteca?” (article), Unomasuno cultural section, 1992
- “Como Hacer para que le Rechacen una Pastorela” (chronicle), Unomasuno cultural section, 1992.
- “Habia una Vez un Hombre muy Feo” (short story), Unomasuno cultural section, 1991.
- “In the storybook: Con Licencia para Escribir, (Tapir, Mexico D.F.)

== Awards and honors ==
- National award Premio Nacional de Novela Jose Ruben Romero in 1995 for “Y si yo Fuera Susana San Juan...”
- Young Creators Fellowship from Mexico's Fondo Nacional para la Cultura y las Artes – the National Council For the Culture and Arts in 1996.
- Pegaso Fellowship from Casa Lamm in collaboration with the Writers’ Center Juan Jose Arreola for a yet to be published novel.
