= Otero (Spain) =

- Municipality
- Flag Coat of arms

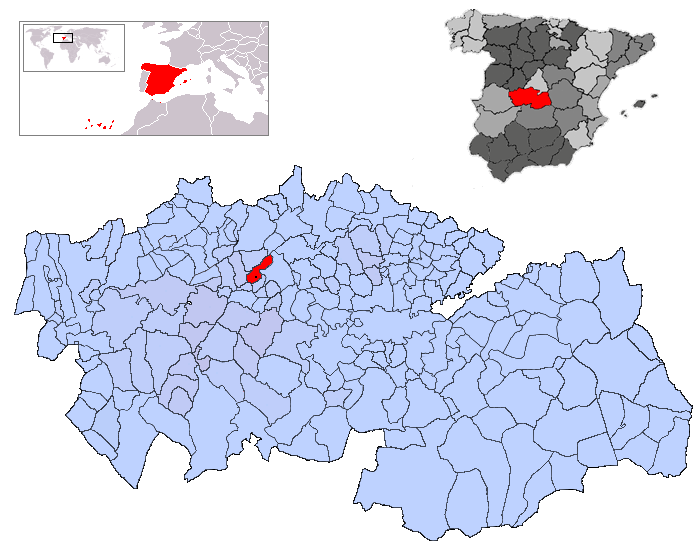

- Location in Spain
- Coordinates: 39°59′57″N 4°30′46″W
- Country: Spain
- Autonomous community: Castilla-La Mancha
- Province: Toledo
- Comarca: Torrijos
- Judicial district: Torrijos

Government
  - Alcalde: Juan Lorenzo Moreno Labrado (2007)

Area
  - Total: 30 km^{2} (12 sq mi)
- Elevation: 466 m (1,529 ft)

Population (2025-01-01)
  - Total: 436
  - Density: 15/km^{2} (38/sq mi)
- Demonym(s): Oterano, na
- Time zone: UTC+1 (CET)
  - Summer (DST): UTC+2 (CEST)
- Postal code: 45543
- Dialing code: 925
- Official language(s): Castilian

Otero is a Spanish municipality of Toledo province, in the autonomous community of Castilla-La Mancha. Its population is 183 and its surface is 30 km², with a density of 6.1 people/km². The mayor is Mr. Juan Lorenzo Moreno Labrado, of the Partido Popular. All the five municipal councillors belong to the Partido Popular.

In the 2004 Spanish General Election the Partido Socialista Obrero got 48.97% of the vote in Otero, the Partido Popular got 48.28% and Izquierda Unida got 1.7%.

There is a freshman dormitory at Stanford University named after Otero. The Otero dorm traditionally holds two floors of women and one floor of men and is widely considered to be one of the more sought-after dorms at the university. Chelsea Clinton lived in the dorm on the third floor from 1997 to 1998.

Otero is the town closest to the Iberian Peninsula Pole of Inaccessibility
