= Emma Dolujanoff =

Mexican writer (1922–2013)

- Born: 8 December 1922; Mexico City
- Died: 23 April 2013 (aged 90)

Emma Dolujanoff (8 December 1922 – 23 April 2013) was a Mexican doctor and writer. She wrote about the indigenous Mayos.

== Life ==
Emma Dolujanoff was born in Mexico City in 1922 to parents of Russian lineage. She trained as a medical doctor and obtained her degree in 1945 at the National Autonomous University of Mexico. She worked as an internal medicine doctor at the Floresta Sanatorium (Sanatorio Floresta) until 1957. Dolujanoff also specialized in Neuropsychiatry. The sanatorium Dolujanoff worked at was located in Tlalpan and focused on treating mental illness in the middle class population.

Because she had this knowledge of psychiatry this is reflected in her writing. In 1957 and 1958 she was awarded a scholarship to study writing. Her characters frequently explore their mental problems. She was a fellow of the Mexican Writers Center from 1957 to 1959 along with Hector Azar, Juan Garcia, Elena Poniatwoska, Tomas Mojarro, Emilio Uranga and others. In 1959, Emma Dolujanoff published one of her most significant works, "Cuentos del desierto" (Tales of the Desert) which was a book containing thirteen stories. The book is noted for talking about the lives of the indigenous Mayos who she knew well.

In 1966, Dolujanoff participated in "The Narrators Before the Public" which was organized by the Instituto Nacional de Bellas Artes (INBA). Later in life, Dolujanoff continued to work as a doctor in the department of psychiatry, and then she was the Director of Admission Exams to National Autonomous University of Mexico from 1966 to 1983.

== Works (in English and Spanish) ==
- Book: "Tales of the Desert" (1959), In Spanish: "Cuentos del desierto" (1959)
- "Farewell Job" (1961)
- "The Street of Fire" (1966), In Spanish: "La calle del fuego"
- "The Golden Rooster", In Spanish: "El Gallo de Oro"
- "The Deer Child" (1957)
- "The Story of Tatán" (1957)
- "Top of Mesquite" (1957)
- "Dolls" (1957)
- "The Mother Wolf" (1958)
