= Magaz de Cepeda =

Magaz de Cepeda, Spain
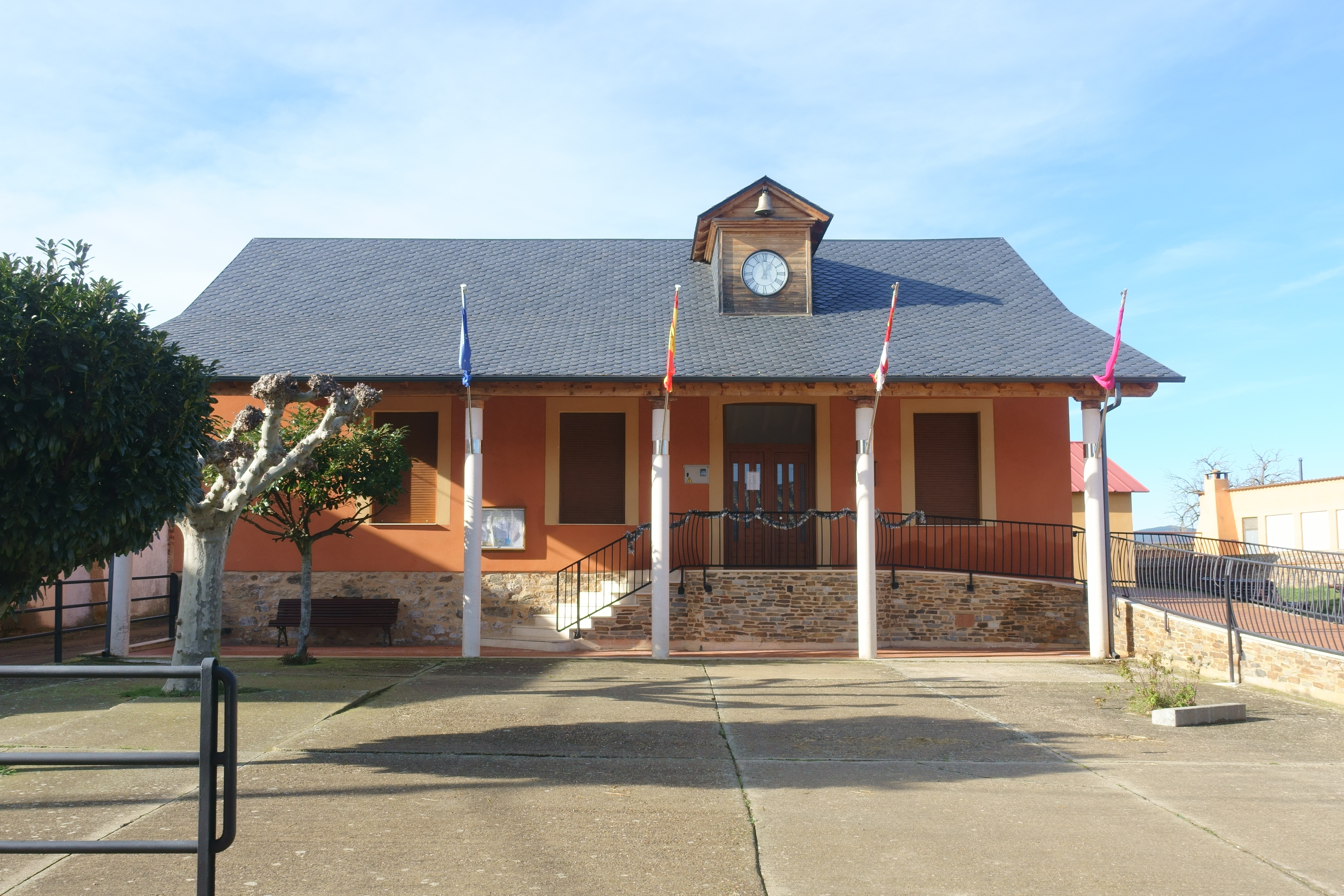
- Town hall

- Coat of arms

- Location within Spain
- Coordinates: 42°32′20″N 6°4′23″W
- Country: Spain
- Autonomous community: Castile and León
- Province: León
- Municipality: Magaz de Cepeda

Government
  - Mayor: José Ángel García Álvarez (PSOE)

Area
  - Total: 72.64 km^{2} (28.05 sq mi)
- Elevation: 894 m (2,933 ft)

Population (2025-01-01)
  - Total: 345
  - Density: 4.75/km^{2} (12.3/sq mi)
- Demonym(s): cepedano, cepedana
- Time zone: UTC+1 (CET)
  - Summer (DST): UTC+2 (CEST)
- Postal Code: 24396, 24397
- Telephone prefix: 987
- Website: Ayto. de Magaz de Cepeda

Magaz de Cepeda (Spanish pronunciation: [maˈɣaθ ðe θeˈpeða]) is a municipality located in the province of León, Castile and León, Spain. According to the 2010 census (INE), the municipality has a population of 412 inhabitants.

Magaz is part of the historical region of La Cepeda.

== Villages ==
- Benamarías
- Magaz de Cepeda
- Porqueros
- Vanidodes
- Vega de Magaz
- Zacos
