= María Dolores Pérez Enciso =

María Dolores Pérez Enciso (1908 in Almería, Andalusia, Spain – 1949 in Mexico City) was a writer and journalist.

She began her studies of education in Almería and then in Barcelona. While in Barcelona she spent a good deal of time at the Residencia de Estudiantes de Ríos Rosas.

After a brief marriage to Francisco del Olmo, she joined the Communist Party and during the Spanish Civil War she acted as Delegate of the Republic. After the end of the civil war, she relocated with her daughter to Colombia because of World War II. While in Colombia she edited the weekly Sábado journal. She later lived in Cuba and finally settled in Mexico. She joined the thousands of scientists, artists and intellectuals that arrived the previous years.

In Mexico, she wrote for the magazine Paquita del Jueves and for the newspaper El Nacional. She reunited with another Andalusian writer, Mercedes Rull, who she had met in Cuba.

She died of peritonitis in 1949.

== Family ==
Enciso's brother Guillermo Pérez Enciso was interned in France, but she was able to retrieve him and take him to South America, where he went on to became the first director of the School of Psychology at the Central University of Venezuela; he later married the Venezuelan writer and historian Gisela Morazzani.

Her daughter Rosa del Olmo Pérez Enciso went on to work in the area of Latin American Critical Criminology. She studied in the Venezuela, the US and the University of Cambridge and taught at several universities in Mexico, Puerto Rico, and the USA; she later became director of the Institute of Criminal and Criminological Sciences at the Faculty of Legal and Political Sciences of the Central University of Venezuela, as well as leading the José Félix Ribas Foundation.

== Publications ==
- Treinta estampas de la guerra (1941)
- Un recuerdo del horror con unas palabras (1942)
- IsabelleBlume (1942)
- Cristal de las horas (1942)
- Raíz al viento (1947)
- Root to the Wind: Essays (1947)
- De mar a mar (1946)

== See also ==
Gabriela Mistral
