= María del Carmen Millán =

Mexican university teacher

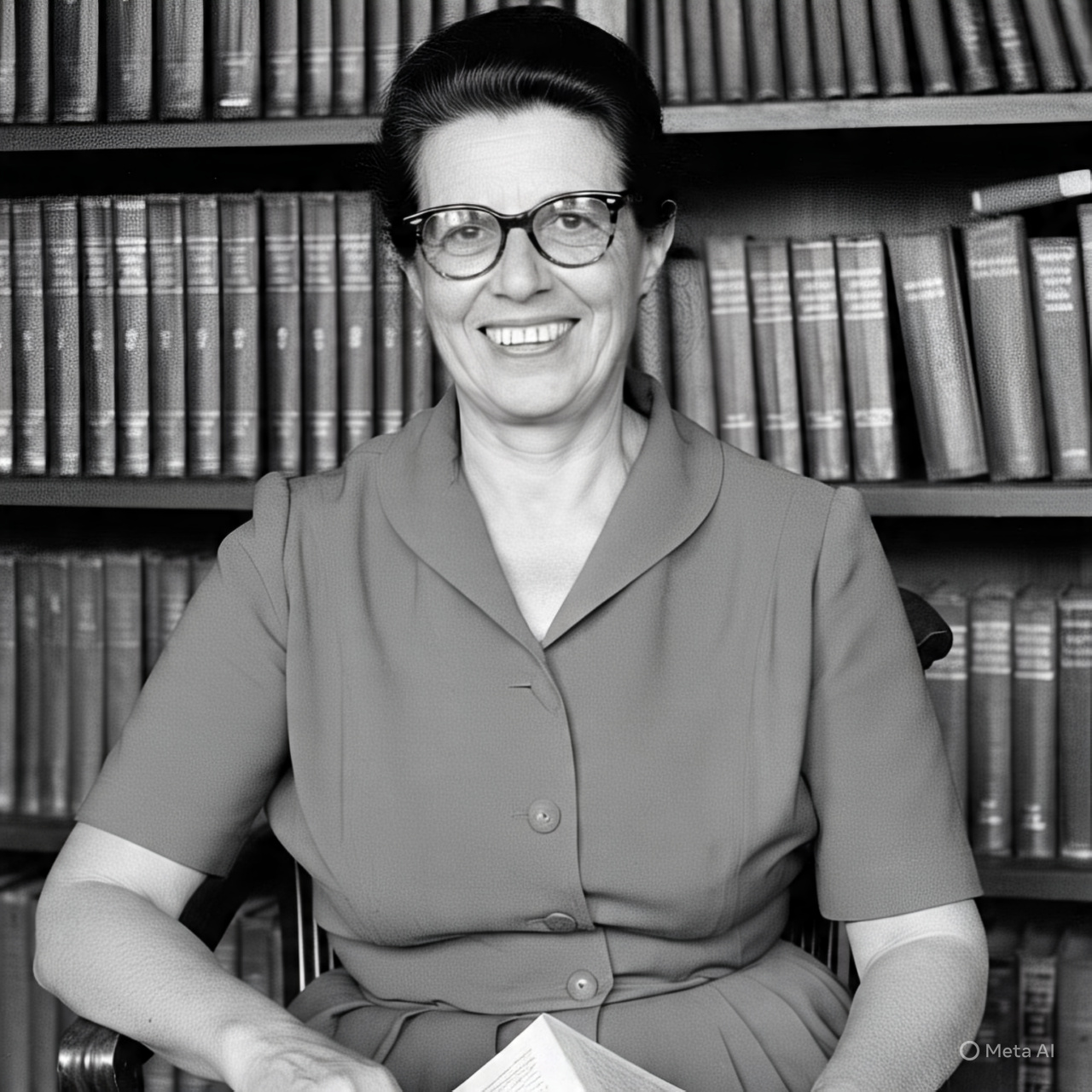
- Born: María del Carmen Francisca Millán Acevedo; 3 December 1914; Teziutlán, Puebla, Mexico
- Died: 1 September 1982 (aged 67); Mexico City, Mexico
- Occupations: academic, writer
- Years active: 1941–1982
- Known for: first woman admitted to the Mexican Academy of Letters

María del Carmen Millán (1914–1982) was a Mexican academic, writer and lecturer who became the first woman admitted to the Mexican Academy of Letters. Her work to preserve the literary heritage of Mexico was recognized both internationally and nationally.

== Early life ==
María del Carmen Francisca Millán Acevedo was born on 3 December 1914 in Teziutlán, Puebla, Mexico to María Acevedo Hernández and Pompello Millán Vargas. She was the eldest of six siblings and her father was a merchant in Teziutlán, where she was raised. She attended primary school at Cantú College before moving to Mexico City in 1937 to attend the National Preparatory School at the San Ildefonso College. In 1940, she entered the National Autonomous University of Mexico (UNAM)'s department of Philosophy and Letters and the following year, began contributing to the journal Tierra Nueva (New Earth). She then began contributing to the Revista Rueca (Rueca Magazine) and by the publication of the second edition, had joined the editorial staff made up of Ernestina de Champourcín, Pina Juárez Frausto, María Ramona Rey, Emma Saro and Carmen Toscano.

== Career ==
Completing her undergraduate studies, Millán began teaching Spanish, as well as the literature of Mexico and Spain in the school system of Mexico City. Continuing her education, she earned her master's degree in literature, graduating Magna Cum Laude, from UNAM in 1952, with a thesis entitled "El paisaje en la poesía mexicana" ("The Landscape of Mexican Poetry"). In 1953 and 1954, Millán was selected as a delegate to the Ibero-American Literature Congresses held in Mexico City and in Berkeley, California. In 1954, she was hired as a full professor in the Faculty of Philosophy and Letters at UNAM, also serving as the department secretary and director of the Center for Literary Studies. In addition, she directed the summer school program for the university.

In 1962, a decade after her master's work, Millán completed her PhD in literature. Her doctoral thesis, "Literatura Mexicana" ("Mexican Literature"), published by Sphinx Publishing House, has become a seminal work as a reference on Mexican literature. That same year, she was awarded the Ordre des Palmes Académiques from the French government and in 1963 was awarded the Order of the Yugoslav Flag with a gold crown. In 1965, she became a traveling lecturer, speaking at German universities in Berlin, Bonn, Cologne, Hamburg, and Heidelberg. In 1967, Millán coordinated, prepared the prologue for and published the Diccionario de Escritores Mexicanos (Dictionary of Mexican Writers), written Aurora M. Ocampo and Ernesto Prado Velázquez. The publication resulted in her recognition by Teziutlán as an "illustrious daughter of Mexico".

In 1970 Millán was appointed as the Director of Audiovisual Education and Publication for the Mexican Secretariat of Public Education (Spanish: Secretaría de Educación Pública (SEP)) In that capacity, she led the organization to produce a collection of works known as Sep-setentas, which gathered the writings of noted Latin American scholars between 1971 and 1976. The goal was to publish works of the best authors in the region, at affordable prices, to make them available to the public at large. The venture successfully published 315 books. She worked with other writers to produce an anthology in two volumes of the works of the poet Ramón López Velarde, on the fiftieth anniversary of his death, in 1971. She also created a study on the dramatic works of Manuel Eduardo de Gorostiza, which remained unpublished.

In 1973, Millán became the manager of both the General Directorate for Publication and Radio Education divisions of SEP. She was elected to the Mexican Academy of letters in 1974 and formally joined the organization in 1975, when she was also selected as Mexico's "Woman of the Year". When she accepted the twelfth chair, Millán was recognized as the first woman admitted to the academy. Continuing to work as manager of the two divisions of SEP until 1976, Millán also prepared an anthology of stories, Antología de cuentos mexicanos which was published in three volumes that same year. She then became the first woman appointed as the Director General of the Mexican Radio Corporation and Television Channel 13.

In 1981, she became the vice president of the Mexican American Institute Of Cultural Relations of Mexico City and that same year was made a permanent secretary of the Mexican Academy.

== Death and legacy ==
Millán died on 1 September 1982 in Mexico City and a memorial to mark her death was held by UNAM. An expanded version of her work on the Diccionario de Escritores Mexicanos began publication in 1988. Luis Mario Schneider compiled the primary works of Millán and published them in two volumes in Puebla in 1992.
