= La Cepeda =

Coordinates: 42.5794°N 6.0723°W

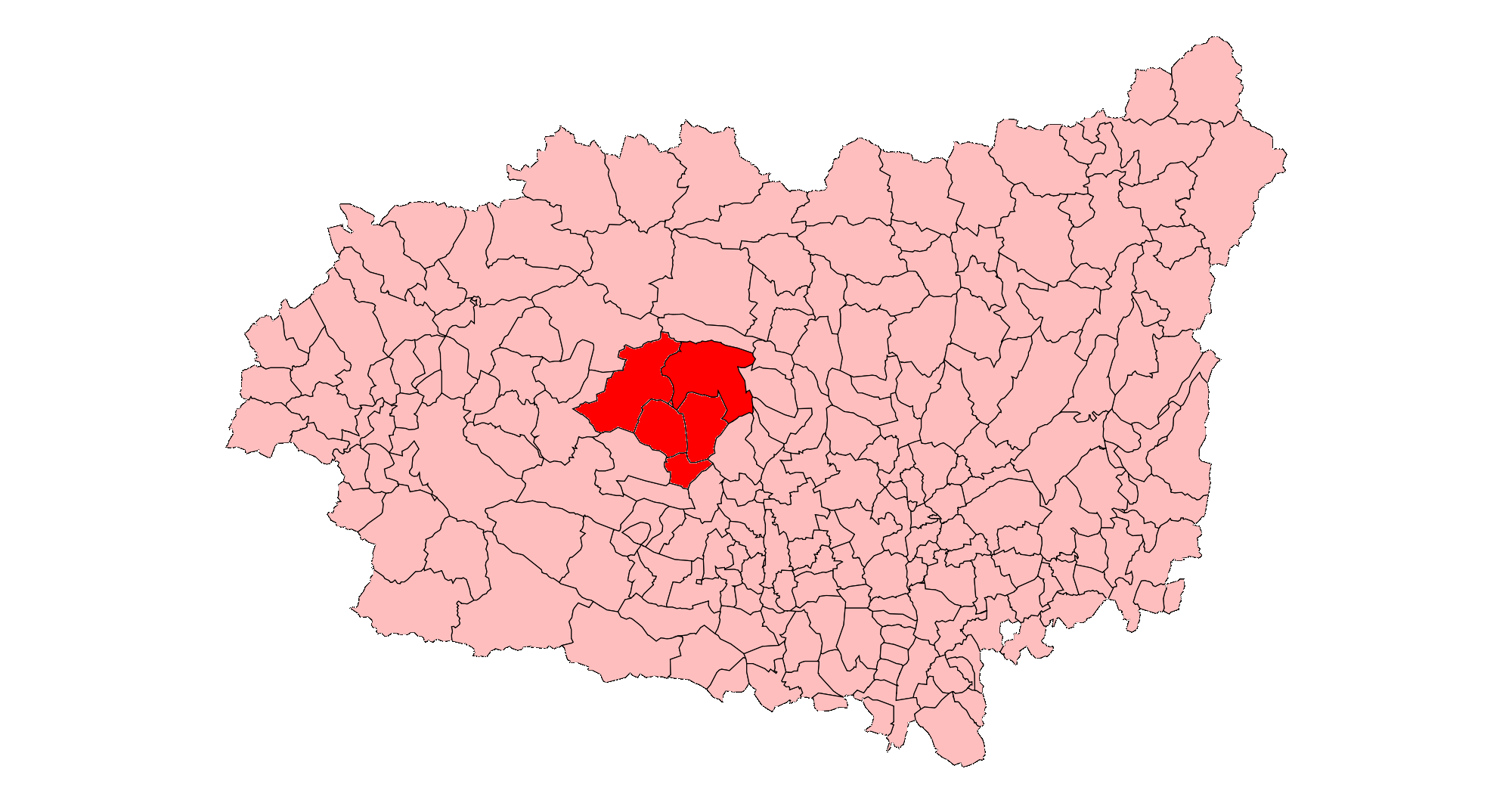
Location of La Cepeda region in the Province of León

La Cepeda is an ancient historical region in the landlocked Province of León, Spain. It borders with La Maragatería, El Bierzo, Omaña and La Vega del Órbigo. It is a traditional comarca without administrative recognition.

== Municipal terms ==
- Quintana del Castillo
- Magaz de Cepeda
- Villagatón
- Villamejil
- Villaobispo de Otero
