= María de los Ángeles Errisúriz =

Mexican writer, teacher and politician

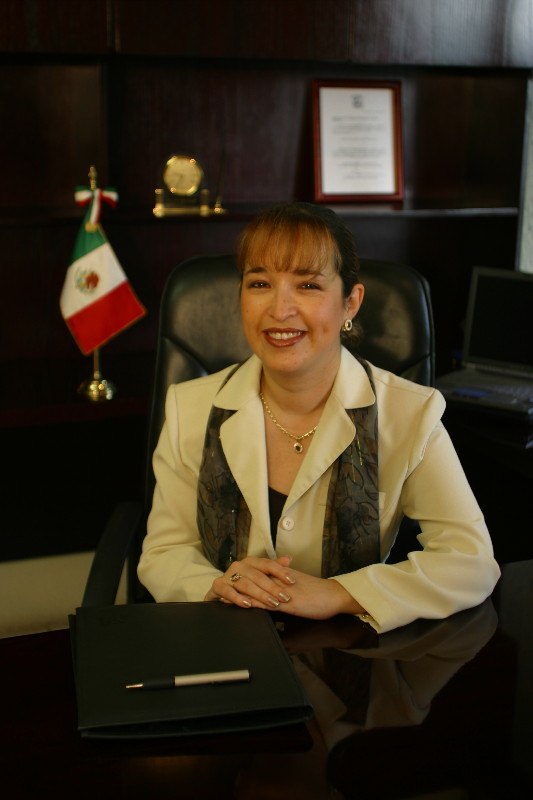

Secretary of Education of Coahuila
- In office 2003–2006
- Preceded by: Humberto Moreira
- Succeeded by: Jaime Castillo Garza

Personal details
- Born: January 18, 1966 (age 60) Allende, Coahuila, Mexico
- Party: Partido Revolucionario Institucional
- Education: Universidad Pedagógica Nacional
- Profession: Teacher

María de los Ángeles Errisúriz Alarcón (born January 18, 1966) is a Mexican writer, teacher and politician. She was Secretary of Education in Coahuila state. Co-author of 18 books to teachers and students about Intelligence Skills Development published in Spanish editorial "Trillas". Currently she is General Director of the Instituto Nacional para la Educación de los Adultos (INEA).

== Early life and education ==
Alarcón was born on January 18, 1966 in Allende, Coahuila. She is the daughter of Norberto Errisúriz and Amparo Alarcón. Between 1981 and 1985, she studied teaching at the Benemérita Escuela Normal of Coahuila. Before that, she studied a licenciate degree in educación media (secondary education) with an specialization in Spanish language and literature by the Escuela Normal Superior of Coahuila. She studied for a master's degree in teaching at the National Pedagogic University.

== Career ==
She was a professor at the Benemérita Escuela Normal de Coahuila (teacher training university) and a member of the board of examiners in that university.

She is assistant editor in the "Moral Values Educative Project in Primary School" by Trillas publishing house. She was co-author of the Educative Program of Coahuila 2001–2005 and president of education working meeting at the 22nd Border Governors Conference celebrated August 10.

She is an active member of the civil organizations: Incluyendo Mexico, Copase and Coparmex, in latest was president of Scholarships Commission.

From 2000 to 2001, she was technical secretary in the Secretariat of Public Education in State of Coahuila, after that was director of social programs by DIF Coahuila. In 2002 she was sub-secretary of Middle Education by the State's Secretariat of Public Education. After that, she became Secretary of Public Education in Coahuila until 2006.
