= Amaranta Osorio Cepeda =

Playwright, actress and arts manager

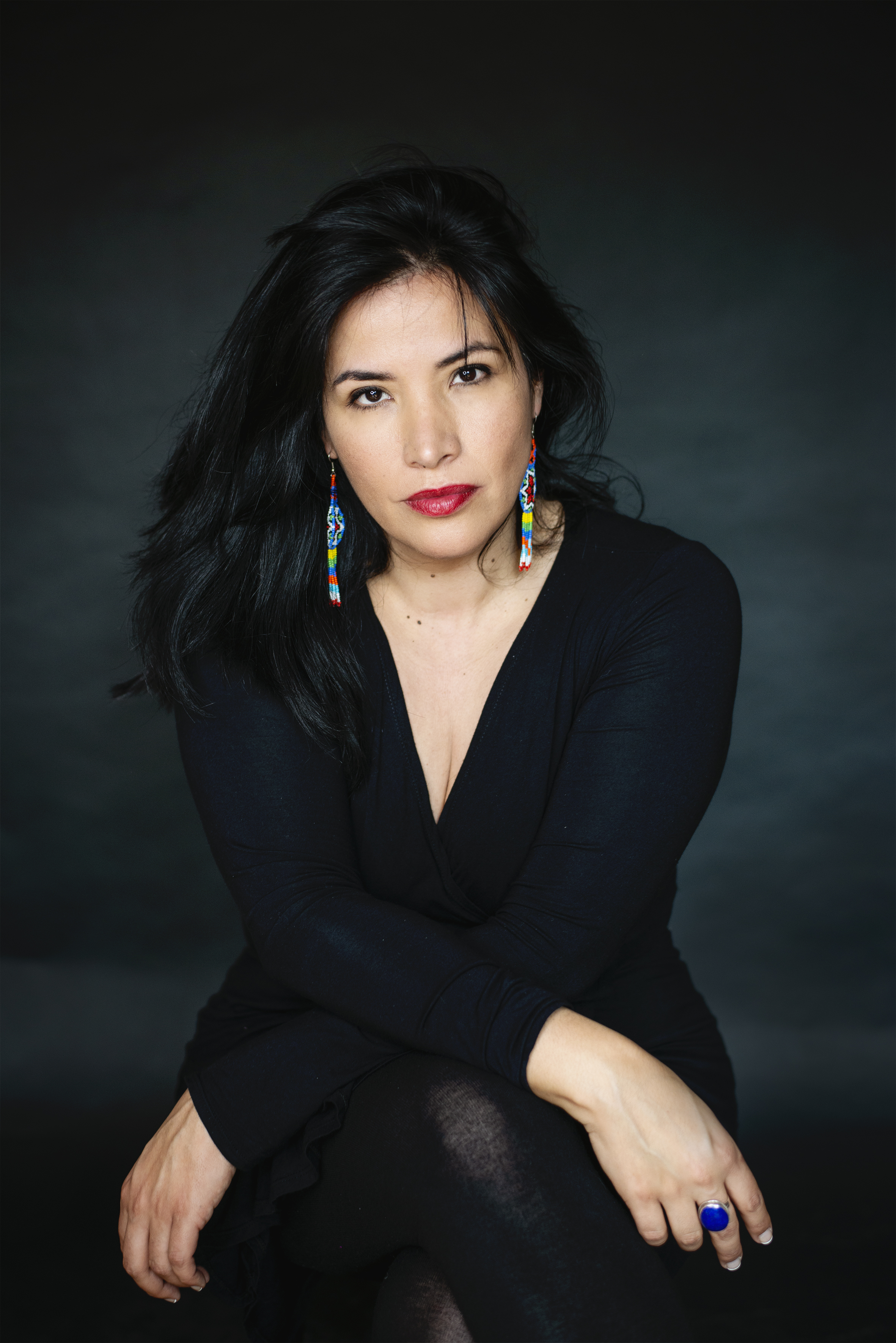

Amaranta Osorio Cepeda (born 1978 in Querétaro, Mexico) is a playwright, actress and arts manager of Mexican, Colombian and Spanish descent. Her plays have won many awards, have been translated into French, English, German, Czech and Greek and have been performed all over the world. Alongside other women from the arts sector, she defends the role of women and their vision of the world through the medium of theatre.

== Biography ==
Born in Mexico into a family with strong connections to the theater world, her mother is the Mexican painter Cristina Cepeda, and her father is the Colombian theatre director Ramiro Osorio, who was also the first Minister of Culture of Colombia. She spent her childhood between Mexico City and Bogotá.

She trained as an actress in Mexico at the Casa del Teatro and then with Augusto Boal, Tadashi Suzuki, Mar Navarro, and Fernando Piernas. She considers Julia Varley of Odin Teatret to be her maestra and mentor. At the age of 21, she moved to Madrid to study dramaturgy at the Real Escuela Superior de Arte Dramático (RESAD) in Madrid. She has a Master's degree in Arts Management from the Complutense University in Madrid, and other postgraduate courses she has taken include a leadership course at Harvard University. In training as a writer she studied with Itziar Pascual, José Sanchís Sinisterra and Juan Mayorga, whom she considers her true maestros.

== Playwright ==
Cepeda has written over ten plays, most of which have been performed. She has written plays alone and also co-authored with Itziar Pascual and Julia Varley. Her monologue “What I didn't say” and her play “Anónimas” toured Mexico, Spain, India, Chile, Ecuador, Colombia and France.

Together with Itziar Pascual she wrote “The fireflies trilogy”, three plays that give voice to characters and worldviews from a female perspective: Mi niña, niña mía (My girl, my little girl) was awarded the Jesús Dominguez Prize in 2016, and premiered at the Teatro Español in Madrid in 2019 directed by Natalia Menéndez; "Vietato dare da mangiare", directed by Víctor Sánchez and performed by Aitana Sánchez Gijón, premiered at the Teatro Español in Madrid in 2018; Clic, cuando todo cambia (Clic, when everything changes) premiered at the Calderón Theater in Valladolid directed by Alberto Velasco and was awarded the Calderón Prize for Dramatic Literature (2018).

== Major plays ==
- El Grito (2021)
- Unicornios (2021)
- Clic. Cuando todo cambia (2020)
- Mi niña, niña mía (Moje Holka) (2019)
- La Jaula (2019)
- Rotunda (2019)
- Lo que no dije (2018)
- Las niñas juegan al fútbol (2018)
- Cera en los ojos (2017)
- Vietato dare da mangiare (2018)
- Anónimas (2014)

=== Translated into English ===
- “What I didn't say” translated by Cristina Ward
- “My girl, my little girl” translated by Phillys Zatlin.

Other plays have been translated into French, German and Czech.

== Awards ==
- 2019.- Beneficiary of the National System of Art Creators (SNCA) of FONCA. Mexico.
- 2019.- Winner of the call Histories of Tea of the National Theater Company of Mexico for the play Rotunda.
- 2018.- Honorable mention for the award Dolores de Castro, for the play Lo que no dije. Mexico.
- 2017.- Calderón Award for Dramatic Literature, for the play Clic, cuando todo cambia. Spain.
- 2016.- Jesús Domínguez Award, for the play Mi niña, niña mía (Moje Holka). Spain.
- 2015.-Finalist of the Premio Fernando Lara de Novela for the novel Salta. España.
- 2009.-Prizes for the short film Inseparables: Premio Mejor Cortometraje. Censur de Corto (Spain), Mención en el premio Internacional de Cinecortos de Mercedes, Buenos Aires (Argentina), Mejor Recorto. Certamen de Cortometraje Visualia 2011(Spain)
- 2003.- Caja Madrid de Teatro Exprés Award for the play ¿Contestas? Spain.

== Publications ==
- El Grito (2021) Revista Primer Acto nº360.
- Clic, cuando todo cambia (2010). Editorial ASSITEJ.
- La Jaula (2020).Nº 80, Revista Paso de Gato, Mexico.
- Las niñas juegan al fútbol (2019) Translated by Agnès Surbezy Ed. Presses Universitaires du Midi. France
- Lo que no dije (2018) Published by Premio Dolores de Castro.
- Cera en los ojos (2017) Revista Acotaciones, num. 39.
- Mi niña, niña mía (Moje Holka) (2016). Revista Primer Acto nº 351.
- Inseparables (2008) shortfilm. Dir. Adel Khader
- Tubos (2005) Editorial Fundamentos.
- ¿Contestas? (2004). AAT, Ed. Fundamentos, Revista la Siega, Revista Sibila.

== Acting career ==
As an actor she has appeared in three films (directed by Daniel Cebrián, Álvaro Fernández Armero and Galo Urbina), ten television series (including “Yo soy Bea”, “El comisario”, “Segundo Asalto” among others), 21 plays in different countries (with directors such as Julia Varley, Jill Greenhalgh, Sanchis Sinisterra, among others) and 9 short films.

== Career as arts manager and producer ==
As an arts manager, she has directed and coordinated international theatre festivals in Colombia, Costa Rica, Mexico and Spain. Her company, Jeito Producciones, active between 2008 and 2016, received the Bancaja Young Entrepreneurs Award in 2011.

One of her goals as a programmer and director is to highlight work by female creative artists as in the A Solas Festival. In 2011 she joined The Magdalena Project, an international network of women artists and creators that seeks to give visibility to the role of women in the theatre.

She has directed the festivals 7 caminos teatrales en México (2008-2010), The Festival of the Arts of San José de Costa Rica (2010), Festival A Solas- The Magdalena Project, in the Teatros del Canal of Madrid (2013), and was the programmer of the Festival Tantidhatri 2019 in Calcutta, India, led by Parvathy Baul.
