= Jesusa Rodríguez =

Mexican theater director, actress, performance artist, social activist and politician

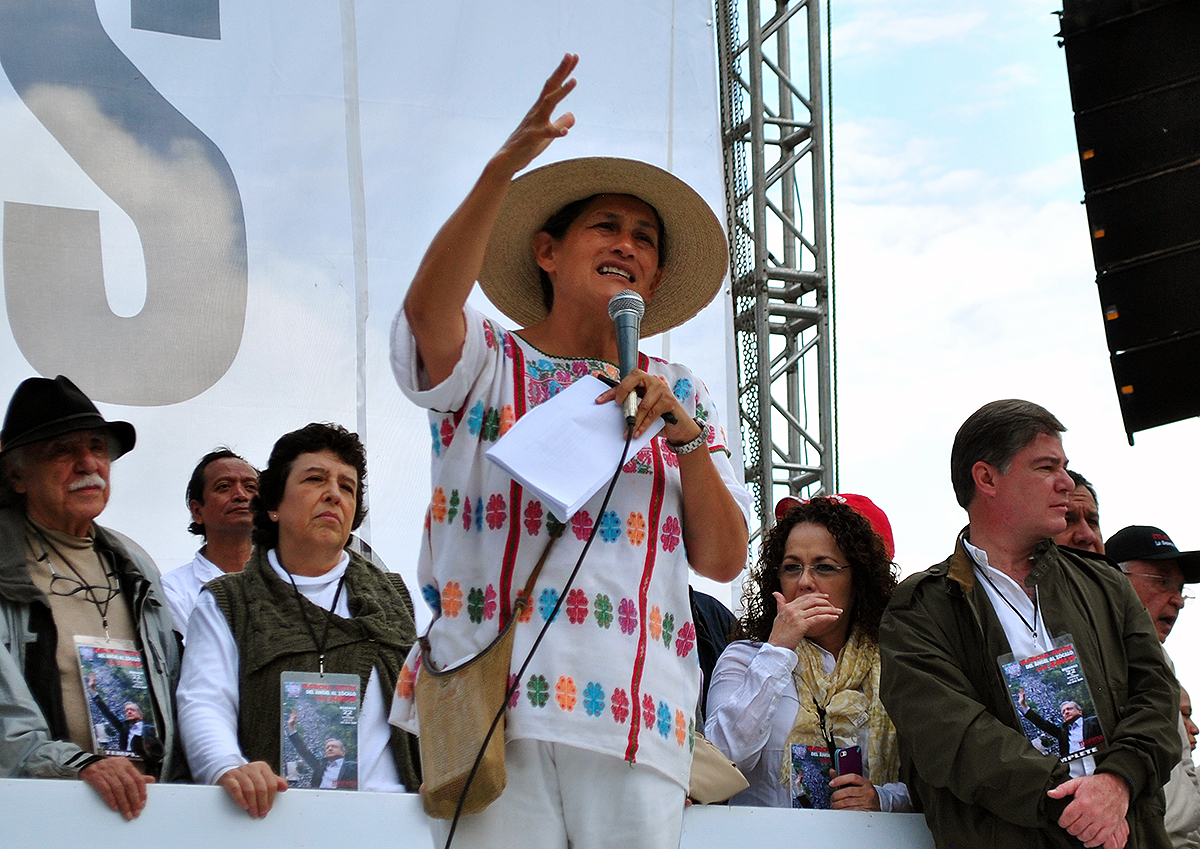
Jesusa Rodríguez in 2013.

Jesusa Rodríguez (born 1955, Mexico City, Mexico) is a Mexican theater director, actress, performance artist, social activist, elected Senator of the Morena party and an active promoter of the use of marihuana and other drugs. She is an active representative of the LGBT community.

Her low-cost "espectáculos" (a Spanish word that can mean both "spectacles" and "shows") do not necessarily adhere to traditional genre classification. These works draw on Greek tragedy, cabaret, pre-Columbian, and operatic traditions. They can take the form of a revue, sketch, "carpa", or political performance art.

== Biography ==
In the 1980s, Rodríguez notably directed an adaption of Mozart's Don Giovanni, featuring an all-female cast, entitled Donna Giovanni (1983). In 1988 she directed Oskar Panizza's El Concilio de Amor (The Council of Love). Rodríguez won an Obie for Best Actor in Las Horas de Belén, A Book of Hours (1999) along with Ruth Maleczech and New York-based Mabou Mines.

From 1990 until 2005, she and her wife, the Argentine singer/actress Liliana Felipe, operated El Hábito and Teatro de la Capilla, alternative performances spaces in Mexico City. El Hábito is now under the administration of Las Reinas Chulas, and Rodríguez is now dedicated to independent projects.

Rodríguez's works regularly revisit historical cultures, icons, and symbols, such as her "La gira mamal de la Coatlicue" of 1993, where she transforms a pre-Hispanic statue from the Mexica (Aztec) Room of Mexico's National Anthropology Museum into a contemporary, living being. Through the use of an indigenous female icon confined in a museum, the artist parodies the attitude of official Mexican politicians toward their country's problems. This work calls upon her children not to forget her and complains about not having a special car (a "mama-mobile") like the pope's. Rodríguez calls the show "pre-Hispanic cabaret," thus pointing to the need to reduce the monolithic myths upon which nationalism tends to be based.

Other famous female icons recreated by Rodríguez in her shows include Frida Kahlo (Trece señoritas, 1983), La Malinche (transformed by Rodríguez into an interpreter for former president Ernesto Zedillo and the U.S. Marines) and the nun Juana Inés de la Cruz ("Las trampas del fatuo", 1990, and "Sor Juana en Almoloya," 1995). Jesusa has impersonated Sor Juana in many political demonstrations and, as part of the Mexico City Pride March. In these particular cases, Rodríguez represented her version of Mexican history "by revisiting and emphasizing the dissident sexualities of these women, who have been hidden or strategically forgotten by official culture".

In 2002, she collaborated with Liliana Felipe and Regina Orozcos on "New War, New War," for the 3rd Encuentro of the Hemispheric Institute of Performance and Politics.

Rodríguez also contributes regularly to Mexico's most important feminist journal, Debate Feminista.

== Selected performances ==
- 1990: La gira mamal de la Coatlicue, Teatro Bar El Habito, Mexico City
- 1991: La Malinche en Dios T.V., Teatro Bar El Habito, Mexico City
- 1992: Cielo de abajo, Teatro Bar El Habito, Mexico City
- 1995: Sor Juana en Almoloya, Teatro Bar El Habito, Mexico City
- 2001: La soldadera autogena, Encuentro of the Hemispheric Institute of Performance and Politics, Monterrey, Mexico
- 2004: Cabaret prehispanico, Solomon R. Guggenheim Museum New York

== Sources ==
- Costantino, Roselyn, "Visibility as Strategy: Jesusa Rodríguez's Body in Play", Corpus Delecti: Performance (2000)
- Art of the Americas. Ed. Coco Fusco. London/New York: Routledge: pp. 63 – 77
