= Jane Unrue =

American writer and educator

Jane Unrue is an American writer and educator. She was born in Columbus, Ohio, grew up in Las Vegas, Nevada, and graduated from the University of Illinois at Urbana-Champaign (B.A.) and Brown University (M.F.A.). She has taught at Emerson College, Boston College, and Wellesley College, and currently teaches at Harvard University, where she directs the Harvard Scholars at Risk (SAR) Program and chairs the Freedom to Write Committee board for PEN New England.

== Selected works ==
- 2015. Love Hotel. New Directions.(novel)
- 2010. Life of a Star. Burning Deck Press (short novel)
- 2006. Dear Mr. Erker. 3rd bed (novella)
- 2005. Atlassed. Ravenna Press (collection)
- 2000. The House. Burning Deck publishers (short novel)
- “Looking Sideways”: unsaid, vol.1, no. 1
- “Happiness/Sadness Patterns”: 5_trope (webdelsol.com/5_trope), March ’05
- “Hands Reaching out of a Black Background”: 3rd bed, fall/winter ’04
- “A New Position for the Upper Lip”: diagram (thediagram.com), 3.5
- “Passion (Asleep)”: 5_trope, June ’03
- “Changes in the Upper Face”: del sol review (webdelsol.com/Del_Sol_Review.com), summer ’03
- “November”; “India”; “Lima”; “Quebec”: The Denver Quarterly, fall ’01
- “Seven Favorite Dog Stories”: “Detector of Narcotics, Explosives”; “Performers on Stage or Screen (Pre-Frenzy)”; “Carrier of Messages”; “Adapted to Life in City and Country”; “Antidotes, Inoculations”; “Trotter”; “Watcher, Guarder”: Fence, Vol. 4, No. 1
- “Child, Bird, Box”: Iowa Review Web
- “Surviving the Flood”: Cimarron Review, Vol. 119

== Texts ==
- Echo
- the mouth: ‘i’d be ashamed’; the eyes: ‘when shall we meet again?'
- A New Position for the Lower Lip
- Passion (Asleep)
