= List of Italian women writers =

This is a list of women writers (including poets) who were born in Italy or whose writings are closely associated with that country.

== A ==
- Vittoria Aganoor (1855–1910), poet, letter writer
- Milena Agus (born 1959), novelist
- Sibilla Aleramo (1876–1960), poet, autobiographer, feminist writer
- Gabriella Ambrosio (born 1954), novelist, essayist, journalist
- Isabella Andreini (1562–1604), playwright, poet, actress
- Tullia d'Aragona (c. 1510–1556), writer, philosopher, courtesan
- Antonia Arslan (born 1938), novelist, critic, translator, educator
- Devorà Ascarelli (c. 16th century), poet and translator
- Costanza d'Avalos Piccolomini (died 1560), poet
- Elisa S. Amore (born 1984), novelist

== B ==
- Ida Baccini (1850–1911), children's writer
- Emma Baeri (born 1942), feminist historian, political scientist
- Teresa Bandettini (1763–1837), poet, dancer
- Anna Banti (1895–1985), historical novelist, critic, autobiographer
- Barbara Baraldi, thriller novelist
- Giuseppa Barbapiccola, (1702–c. 1740), poet, translator
- Laura Battiferri (1523–1589), poet
- Giuliana Berlinguer (1933–2014), film director, screenwriter, novelist
- Angela Bianchini (1921–2018), novelist, short story writer, translator
- Alberta Bigagli (1928–2017), poet
- Margarita Bobba (16th century), poet
- Catherine of Bologna (1413–1463), religious writer, saint
- Simona Bonafé (born 1973), journalist, politician
- Laudomia Bonanni (1907–2002), writer, journalist
- Maria Selvaggia Borghini (1656–1731), poet, translator
- Benedetta Brevini, academic, author, journalist, and reformer
- Helle Busacca (1915–1996), poet, painter, author

== C ==
- Paola Calvetti (born 1958), novelist, journalist
- Duccia Camiciotti (1928–2014), poet, essayist
- Manuela Campanelli (born 1962), journalist, non-fiction writer
- Paola Capriolo (born 1962), novelist, translator
- Lara Cardella (born 1969), novelist, author of Good Girls Don't Wear Trousers
- Catherine of Siena (1347–1380), religious writings
- Nadia Cavalera (born 1950), novelist, poet, critic
- Laura Cereta (1469–1499), 15th-century letter writer
- Isabella Cervoni (1575–1600), poet
- Alba de Céspedes (1911–1997), journalist, novelist
- Saveria Chemotti (born 1947), non-fiction, essays, literary criticism, novels
- Maria Chessa Lai (1922–2012), Catalan poet from Sardinia
- Elisa Chimenti (1883–1969), author
- Fausta Cialente (1898–1994), novelist
- Maria Luisa Cicci (1760–1794), poet
- Vittoria Colonna (1492–1547), popular 16th-century poet
- Danila Comastri Montanari (1948–2023), novelist
- Cristina Comencini (born 1956), novelist, film director
- Margherita Costa (17th century), poet, songwriter
- Maria Corti (1915–2002), philologist, critic, novelist

== D ==
- Virgilia D'Andrea (1888–1933), anarchist poet
- Emanuela Da Ros (born 1959), children's writer
- Grazia Deledda (1871–1936), novelist, poet, Nobel laureate
- Silvana De Mari (born 1953), children's writer, fantasy novelist
- Compiuta Donzella (13th century), earliest women poet writing in Italian
- Paola Drigo (1876–1938), short story writer, novelist
- Francesca Duranti (1935–2025), novelist

== E ==
- Muzi Epifani (1935–1984), novelist, poet, playwright, columnist

== F ==
- Camilla Faà (c. 1599–1662), early autobiographer
- Oriana Fallaci (1929–2006), journalist, biographer
- Eleonora Fonseca Pimentel (1752–1799), poet, letter writer
- Moderata Fonte (1555–1592), Venetian poet
- Laudomia Forteguerri (1515–1555?), poet
- Biancamaria Frabotta (1946–2022), poet, playwright, essayist, non-fiction writer
- Veronica Franco (1546–1591), poet

== G ==
- Veronica Gambara (1485–1550), poet, letter writer
- Brunella Gasperini (1918–1979), journalist, novelist
- Natalia Ginzburg (1916–1991), novelist, short story writer, essayist
- Cinzia Giorgio (born 1975), novelist, playwright, essayist
- Elisabetta Gnone (born 1965), children's writer
- Venerable Gotamī (born 1999), writer and Bhikkhunī
- Simonetta Greggio (born 1961), novelist, writes in French
- Cornelia Barbaro Gritti (1719–1808), poet and salon-holder
- Amalia Guglielminetti (1881–1941), poet, letter writer
- Margherita Guidacci (1921–1992), poet, translator
- Lucia Guerrini (1921–1990), classical scholar, archaeologist, writer and editor

== J ==
- Fleur Jaeggy (born 1940), Swiss-born Italian-language novelist

== M ==
- Maria-Antonietta Macciocchi (1922–2007), journalist, non-fiction writer
- Alessandra Macinghi (1406–1471), letter writer
- Clementina Laura Majocchi (1866–1945)
- Maria Majocchi (1864–1917) writer, journalist, editor-in-chief
- Laura Beatrice Mancini (1821–1869), poet, salonist
- Gianna Manzini (1896–1974), novelist
- Dacia Maraini (born 1936), novelist, playwright, poet, journalist
- Faustina Maratti (c. 1679–1745), poet
- Andrea Marcolongo (born 1987) Greek classics enthusiast
- Lucrezia Marinella (1571–1653), poet, prose writer
- Battista Malatesta (c. 1384–1448), Renaissance poet
- Chiara Matraini (1515–1604), poet, religious writer
- Margaret Mazzantini (born 1961), actress, novelist
- Melania Mazzucco (born 1966), author
- Diamante Medaglia Faini (1724–1770), poet, madrigal composer
- Alda Merini (1931–2009), revered poet
- Maria Messina (1887–1944), short story writer and novelist
- Beatrice Monroy (born 1953), author and dramatist
- Maria Montessori (1870–1952), educational writer
- Giuliana Morandini (1938–2019), novelist, children's writer
- Elsa Morante (1912–1985), novelist, short story writer, poet
- Marta Morazzoni (born 1950), novelist, short story writer
- Lisa Morpurgo (1923–1998), novelist
- Isabella Morra (c. 1520–1545), Renaissance poet

== N ==
- Ada Negri (1870–1945), poet, novelist
- Giulia Niccolai (1934–2021), poet, novelist, translator

== O ==
- Anna Maria Ortese (1914–1998), short story writer, poet

== P ==
- Angeliki Palli (1798–1875), Greek-Italian playwright, novelist, poet, translator
- Melissa Panarello (born 1985), erotic novelist
- Valeria Parrella (born 1974), novelist, short story writer, playwright
- Nicoletta Pasquale (16th century), poet
- Jeanne Perego (born 1958), children's writer
- Sandra Petrignani (born 1952), journalist, short story writer, novelist
- Giulietta Pezzi (1810–1878), poet, novelist, playwright
- Fernanda Pivano (1917–2009), journalist, biographer, critic, translator
- Christine de Pizan (1364–c. 1430), courtly poet, wrote in French
- Antonia Pozzi (1912–1938), poet, diarist, translator
- Antonia Tanini Pulci (1452/54–1501), early playwright

== R ==
- Fabrizia Ramondino (1936–2008), novelist
- Lidia Ravera (born 1951), journalist, novelist, essayist, screenwriter
- Marina Ripa Di Meana (1941–2018), autobiographical novelist
- Eugenia Romanelli (born 1972), author, journalist
- Lalla Romano (1906–2001), novelist, poet, journalist

== S ==
- Diodata Saluzzo Roero (1774–1840), poet, novelist
- Sara Santoro Bianchi (1950–2016), archaeologist and classical scholar
- Maria Antonia Scalera Stellini (1634–1704), poet, playwright
- Michela Schiff Giorgini (1923–1978), Egyptologist, non-fiction writer
- Matilde Serao (1856–1927), Greek-born Italian journalist, novelist
- Clara Sereni (1946–2018), autobiographical literature
- Ippolita Maria Sforza (1446–1484), letter writer, poet
- Gabriella Sica (born 1950), poet
- Maria Luisa Spaziani (1923–2014), poet, translator, academic writer
- Gaspara Stampa (1523–1554), Renaissance poet
- Sara Copia Sullam (1592–1641), poet

== T ==
- Susanna Tamaro (born 1957), novelist, children's writer
- Clotilde Tambroni (1758–1817), philologist, poet
- Virginia Tango Piatti (1869–1958), writer and pacifist
- Laura Terracina (1519–c. 1577), poet
- Maria Tore Barbina (1940–2007), poet, translator
- Maria Antonietta Torriani (1840–1920), journalist, novelist; pen name "Marchesa Colombi"
- Lucrezia Tornabuoni (1425–1482), poet
- Cristina Trivulzio di Belgiojoso (1808–1871), non-fiction writer, journalist
- Licia Troisi (born 1980), fantasy novelist

== V ==
- Patrizia Valduga (born 1953), poet, translator
- Maria Valtorta (1897–1961), poet, mystic
- Ida Vassalini (1891–1953), poet, philosopher
- Angela Veronese (1778–1847), poet
- Grazia Verasani (born 1964), crime writer
- Simona Vinci (born 1970), novelist, children's writer
- Patrizia Vicinelli (1943–1991), poet, actress
- Mitì Vigliero Lami (born 1957), journalist, poet, essayist, humorist
- Isabella Vincentini (born 1954), poet, essayist, critic
- Annie Vivanti (1866–1942), novelist, short story writer, playwright

== Z ==
- Paola Zancani Montuoro (1901–1987), Italian archaeologist, writer and editor
- Giovanna Zangrandi (1910–1988), novelist
- Luisa Zeni (1896–1940), secret agent, writer

== See also ==
- List of Italian writers
- List of women writers
- List of Italian-American women writers
