= Lina Schwarz =

Italian writer (1876–1947)

- Schwarz, 1920s
- Born: 20 March 1876; Verona, Kingdom of Italy
- Died: 24 November 1947 (aged 71); Arcisate, Italy
- Occupations: Writer, educator

Lina Schwarz (20 March 1876 – 24 November 1947) was an Italian writer, educator, and pacifist. Born into a Jewish family living in Verona, she spent most of her life in Milan. As a result of participating in the women's rights movement in Italy, she became involved in helping disadvantaged children through civic works projects. Teaching children to read led to her becoming a well-known children's book author and a contributor to children's newspapers. She collaborated with musicians to set poems to music, recognizing the potential to increase learning through song. Many of the nursery rhymes known and recited by Italians were written by Schwarz. Although her poem "Stella, stellina, la notte si avvicina" ("Star, Little Star, The Night Approaches") is widely known in Italy, her authorship of it was lost after World War II ended.

Schwarz was a committed pacifist and participated in the 1921 Women's International League for Peace and Freedom Congress of Vienna. She was also one of the developers of anthroposophy in Italy, was one of the first Italian translators of Rudolf Steiner's work, and founded the first Steiner school in Italy. Through her work with women's groups, she introduced anthroposophy to girls' lyceums. Because of anti-Semitic policies adopted by the fascist government of Italy, her ability to publish and disseminate information about anthroposophy declined from 1933. In 1941, she moved from Milan to a farm in Arcisate which used the biodynamic agricultural methods advocated by Steiner. From 1943 to 1945, she fled to Switzerland. Returning to the farm, now operated by the Anthroposophical Society, she died in 1947. In 1963, the school in Arcisate was named in her honor. Her books have been republished in numerous editions and many of her poems are still performed by musicians.

== Early life and education ==
Lina Schwarz was born on 20 March 1876 in Verona in the Kingdom of Italy to Fanny (née Jung) and Edmondo Schwarz. Her father was born in Nagykanizsa, Austria-Hungary, an area known for raising livestock and leather goods. His family were Jewish merchants and after his marriage to Fanny, Edmondo opened a leather shop. Fanny was born into a landowning family from Milan. Lina was one of four children – two boys, Gustavo and Ugo, and another girl, Lucia. Around 1890, her family relocated to Milan and settled in the fashionable area surrounding Via della Spiga. She entered the Alessandro Manzoni Lyceum, but was unable to finish her studies there because of poor health. She completed her education studying with private tutors.

== Activism ==
Schwarz became active in various women's organizations, including the Unione Femminile Nazionale (National Women's Union), the Associazione La Fraterna (The Brotherhood Association), and the Associazione Scuola e Famiglia (School and Family Association). The Unione Femminile was founded in 1899 and was Italy's most important women's organization at the time. Its goals were to expand the rights of women and to serve as a networking organization to allow women across varying religions and social classes to collaborate collectively. The Associazione La Fraterna was a community service organization designed to provide guidance in physical, moral and intellectual development. Schwarz worked with girls in the organization, teaching reading and recreational activities. Similarly, the Associazione Scuola e Famiglia was an organization founded by the sisters Paola and Gina Lombroso as an after-school program and nursery for working mothers. The organization was supported by the Unione Femminile and Schwarz's work with the association led her to begin publishing rhymes and children's stories. She volunteered there with her friend Laura Orvieto, a fellow writer. At the time, works for children were often written with the intent to educate children and frequently gave harsh lessons. Schwarz's work instead, focused on happiness and mischief, set out to inspire development of their sense of curiosity and comradery. Along with Rosa Genoni, Luisa Magnani, Vittorina Medugno, and Virginia Tango Piatti, she was one of the five Italian delegates who registered to attend the 1921 Women's International League for Peace and Freedom Congress in Vienna.

From 1913, Schwarz followed the teachings of Rudolf Steiner, founder of the spiritual movement known as anthroposophy. That year, she began translating his works and together with Charlotte Ferreri founded a branch of the Steiner study group in Milan to spread his philosophy and educational methods. In 1923, she was the Italian delegate to the conference in Dornach, Switzerland, at which the General Anthroposophical Society was officially founded. Throughout the 1920s her writings were influenced by Steiner's philosophy, which aimed to recover ancient knowledge of the occult and nature in an effort to restore a society which had been degraded by modernization. Steiner's intent was to reintroduce spiritual and intuitive knowledge to scientific rational and empirical methods and thereby change the systems that organized society. He proposed that education, diet, farming, and spirituality should be based on holistic and organic models. Between 1922 and 1926, she introduced Steiner's pedagogical methods to the Lyceum di via Orso (Orso Road Lyceum), which was operated by the Consiglio Nazionale delle Donne Italiane. She was elected president of the Milanese branch of the Italian Anthroposophical Society in 1933 and served until 1941, when the organization was banned by the fascist government.

The relationship between the Italian Anthroposophical Society and fascism was complex. Initially the fascist regime embraced some of its tenets. Schwarz organized a conference on anthroposophy in 1936, for the Associazione nazionale fascista donne artiste e laureate sull'educazione dei giovani (National Fascist Association of Women Artists and Graduates for the Education of Youth). However, closer ties between Nazi Germany and fascist Italy dampened the support for Steiner's philosophy and the activities of members began to come under suspicion and scrutiny. The official adoption of anti-Semitic policies called into question anthroposopy's belief that race was related to spirituality rather than biology. Professor and children's literary historian Renata Lollo, notes this transformation when stating that the reason Schwarz was suspended from publishing in the Corriere dei piccoli from 1938 was that she was "Jewish and Christian", although she was probably not converted to Christianity before 1941. That year, Schwarz moved in with her family living in Arcisate, on a farm known as La Monda. The farm was run following biodynamic agricultural methods advocated by Steiner. The increasing severity of the Italian racial laws, led her to flee to Brissago, Switzerland, in the latter half of 1943, to escape the threat of being sent to a concentration camp. (Note: Marchi, while stating she moved to Switzerland, names the location as Gussago, but the town is around 130 miles (210 km) from Switzerland and 31 miles (50 km) west of Milan. Author Anna Maria De Majo identifies the location as Brissago, which is located in Switzerland close to the Italian border.) When the war ended in 1945, she moved back to Arcisate.

== Works ==
Schwarz made her debut as a writer with Libro dei bimbi (The Children's Book), a book of nursery rhymes for children published in 1904. Thanks to its rapid success, she was able to contribute to several of the major children's journals of the times, including Il giornalino della Domenica (The Sunday Newspaper) and Corriere dei Piccoli (The Little Ones' Courier). In 1910, Ancora! ... Un altro libro dei bimbi (Again! ... Another Children's Book) was released with illustrations by Augusta Rasponi del Sale. (Note: Gian Paolo Marchi, an emeritus professor of Italian Literature who worked at the University of Verona, reports the book was Ancora! ... non si meraviglierà (Again! ... No Surprise) in two publications; however, the Italian copyright catalogue identifies it, as did Lollo, as Ancora! ... Un altro libro dei bimbi) Ancora ... e poi basta! (Again ... And That's Enough) contained her most known nursery rhyme, "Stella, stellina, la notte si avvicina" ("Star, Little Star, The Night Approaches"). (Note: Lollo reports this book was first published in 1922. Marchi states it was first published in 1935, and other sources indicate 1920. Sabrina Fava, noted that the book was reviewed by the journal Letteratura per fanciulli (Literature for Children) in 1923, making the earlier dates likely.) Maria Montessori, as early as 1917 was using samples of Schwarz's poetry in her publications about the Montessori method.

Schwarz was the first Italian translator of Steiner's works. Among her translations related to him and his philosophy are "Dalla cronaca dell'akasha" ("From the Chronicle of the Akasha", 1913), "I punti essenziali della questione sociale" ("The Essential Points of the Social Question", 1920), and "Rudolf Steiner. La scuola: scritti vari" ("Rudolf Steiner: The School, Miscellaneous Writings", 1922). Among other works in the 1920s and 1930s, she published "La bella primavera e primo Sole" ("The Beautiful Spring and First Sun", 1928), "Tra sera e mattina" ("Between Evening and Morning", 1933), and "Cantilene, e Canzoncine" ("Lullabies and Little Songs", 1935).

Many of Schwartz's works have been adapted for musical presentation. With an understanding that music was an educational tool, she wrote works like "Canzoncine per i bimbi con accompagnamento di pianoforte" ("Songs for Children with Piano Accompaniment") which was scored by Elisabetta Oddone, "Cantiamo: Trenta canzoncine per bambini con accompagnamento di pianoforte" ("Let's Sing: Thirty Songs for Children with Piano Accompaniment", 1919) with musical composition by Virginia Mariani Campolieti, and "Ninna-nanna. Canto e pianoforte" ("Ninna-nanna: Song and Piano", 1921) with music by Guido Carlo Visconti. In 1935, composer Nino Rota chose four poems from Schwarz's first book – "Il pastorello" ("The Shepherd Boy"), "Il pescatore" ("The Fisherman"), "È inutile" ("It Is Useless"), and "Tornando a casa" ("Coming Home") – for songs to represent the relationship between children and nature and children and their mother.

== Legacy ==
Schwarz died on 24 November 1947 in Arcisate and was buried in the local cemetery. "Stella, stellina, la notte si avvicina" is widely known throughout Italy, but by the end of the war her authorship of it was not remembered by the public. It has become so iconic that journalist Giulia Borgese, queried in an article about the poem carried in Corriere della Sera whether any Italian between the age of three and one hundred wasn't able to recite it. Historian and professor at the Università Cattolica del Sacro Cuore, Sabrina Fava, stated of Schwarz' work, "ha scritto quasi tutte le poesie che da qualche decennio si reci dini infantili" ("She has written almost all the poems that have been recited by [Italian] children for decades"). Despite her renown, no complete biography of Schwarz had been written by the second decade of the twenty-first century. Historian Peter Staudenmaier stated that she and Maria Gentilli Kassapian of Trieste were the most important anthroposophists of Italy, Fava credits her as the most significant Italian translator of Steiner's work. The farm she had in Arcisate is now owned by the Anthroposophical Society. The elementary school in the village was renamed in her honor in 1963.

Many of her works have been reprinted multiple times and used in textbooks for children. In 1974, Irene Cattaneo, an editor for the journal L'Eco dell'educazione ebraica (The Echo, of Jewish Education), published an anthology, Le vie del tempo (The Ways of Time) which included works by Schwarz and Orvieto, among other Jewish-Italian writers. A sixth edition of Ancora ... e poi basta was released in 2010 by Hoepli Editore. From the mid-1950s to mid-1970s, Tre liriche (Three Poems) which included "Alla luna" ("At the Moon"), "Il piccolo fornaio" ("The Little Baker"), and "Piero il malcontento" ("Piero the Malcontent") set to music by Giulio Cesare Brero were performed often on the national radio service. G. Ricordi & C. released "Dodici canzoncine infantili" ("Twelve Children's Songs") with Schwarz's texts translated into French by Josette Raoul-Duval in 1959. Natalie Merchant, former lead singer of the band 10,000 Maniacs became interested in Schwarz's poetry in 2019 and began adapting musical pieces to sing and interpret the poems.
