= Baccini =

Baccini is an Italian surname. Notable people with the surname include:

- Francesco Baccini (born 1960), Italian singer-songwriter
- Ida Baccini (1850–1911), Italian writer
- Maria Chiara Baccini (born 1981), former Italian female long jumper
- Mario Baccini (born 1957), Italian politician
