= Greggio (surname) =

Greggio is an Italian surname. Notable people with the surname include:

- Ezio Greggio (born 1954), Italian comedian, actor, writer, and film director
- Simonetta Greggio (born 1961), Italian novelist who writes in French
