= Villa Loredan Gritti =

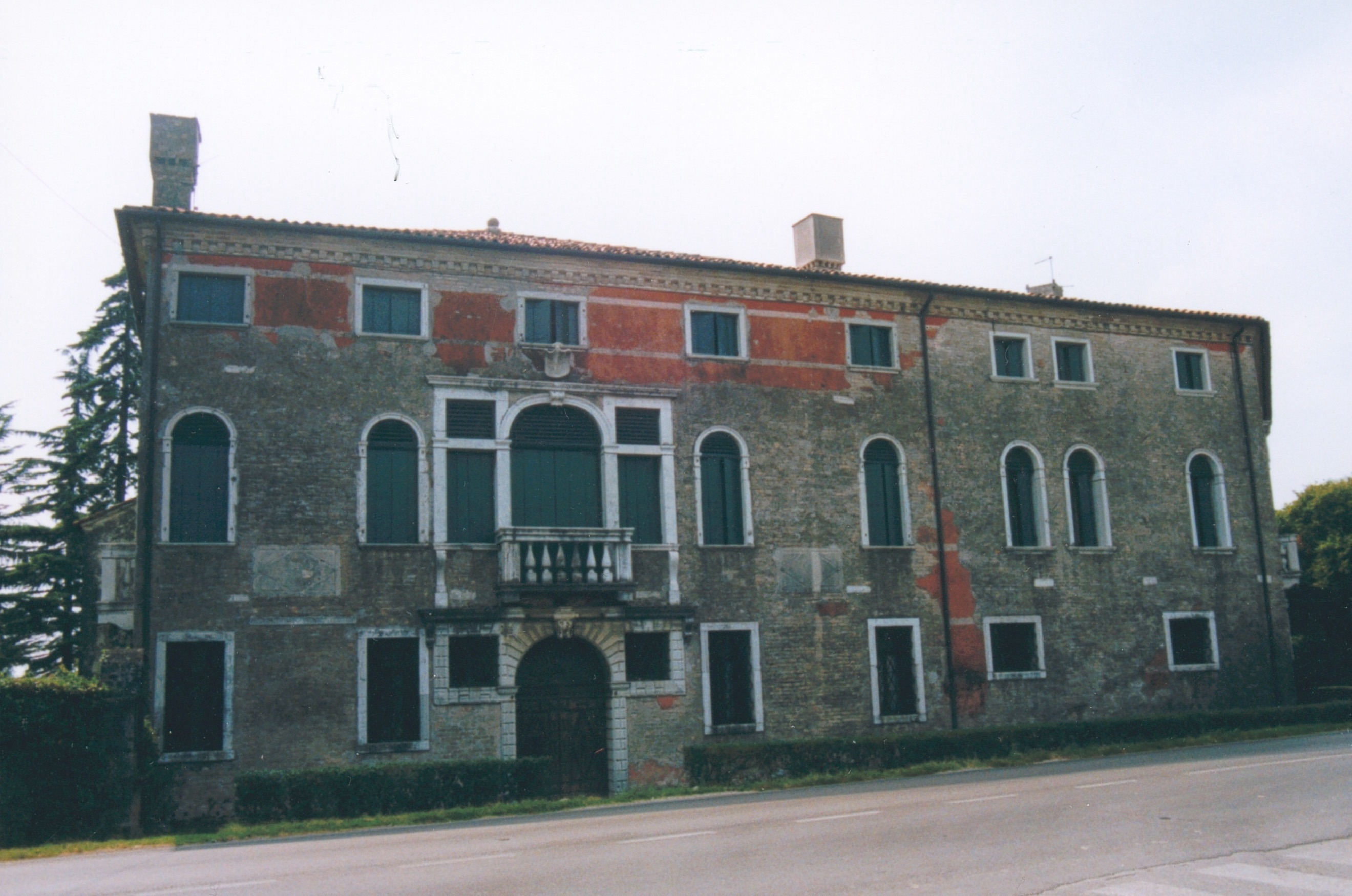
- Alternative names: Villa Cà Spinè
- Etymology: by the Loredan and Gritti families

General information
- Architectural style: Renaissance
- Location: Via per Piavon 16, Oderzo, Italy
- Completed: 16th century

Design and construction
- Architect: school of Jacopo Sansovino
- Developer: Lorenzo Loredan

The Villa Loredan Gritti is a 16th-century Renaissance mansion in the vicinity of the town of Oderzo, Veneto, northern Italy. It was built by the noble Loredan family of Venice and later passed to the Gritti, Boldù, Avogadro, Gradenigo, and Spineda families.

== History ==
The construction of the villa by a branch of the Loredan family is generally dated to the second half of the sixteenth century. The Opitergine cadastral assessments record the name of Lorenzo Loredan, who at that time owned a mill in the podesteria of Oderzo. By the mid-eighteenth century, the property belonged to the Gritti family; in 1787, to the noblewoman Loredan Gritti; and in 1795, to the Boldù family, who retained it until the mid-nineteenth century. It subsequently passed through the Avogadro, Gradenigo, and Spineda families. The villa had fallen into a state of decline and deterioration by the beginning of the twentieth century, and from that time until 1930 Francesco Piovesana began to undertake measures to remedy its condition. The restoration was interrupted during the Second World War and the early post-war period—between 1945 and 1948, the villa was used to house eleven families of Istrian refugees—but resumed in 1950 and was completed in 1973. Finally, a symbolically significant date was its opening to the public during the FAI-Treviso Spring Day in 2010.

== Architecture ==
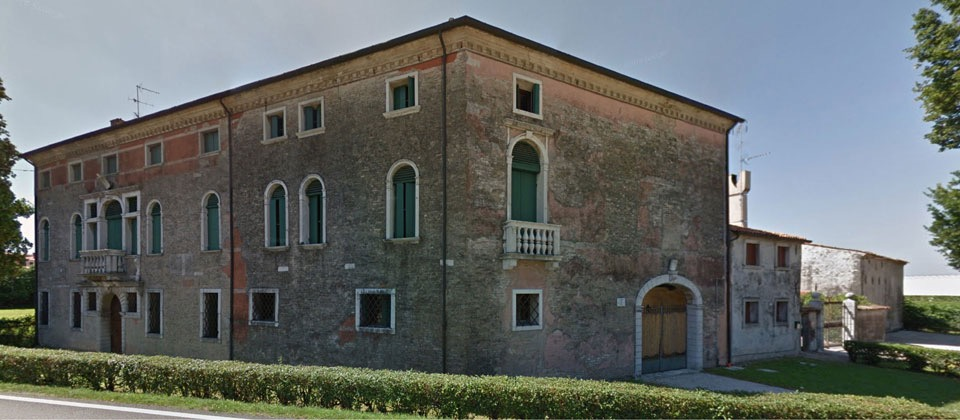
A view of the villa

Despite the damage caused by numerous changes in use, the original structure of the manor house can still be discerned. The pre-Palladian architecture of the villa bears witness to Venetian taste of the fifteenth century in symbiosis with Renaissance aesthetics.

The proportions of the building complex, which was considerably more extensive, have not, however, been preserved. It included a long barchessa along the edge of a road to the north-west that has since disappeared. Nor has the environmental setting of the central building survived, owing to the roadworks undertaken during the nineteenth and twentieth centuries to improve the route between Oderzo and Piavon. The central structure originally faced onto an open space or square, into which the present-day Via Spinè and Via Gorgazzo converged from the west and south. These interventions deprived the villa of its significance, as it had previously occupied a prominent position at the centre of a square (where there was perhaps a wayside shrine or small oratory, demolished during the works and reconstructed almost immediately adjacent to the villa), whereas it is now reduced to a simple—albeit important and distinctive—architectural backdrop on a peripheral road.

The central manor house, square in plan and extending over three storeys arranged in a tripartite configuration, has on its eastern and western elevations (facing respectively the provincial road and the garden) the structural and decorative scheme of the serlianas, which characterise the hall on the piano nobile and, beneath it, the central entrance hall.

An angled wing is attached to the manor house, incorporating a covered carriage passage, which creates a small courtyard sheltered from the north-western winds and terminates in an independent yet connected service dwelling. The complex is accessed from the provincial road through two gates and from a secondary road through another gate, via the surrounding countryside. The normally inhabited villa has a garden with a circular pond and small island, an open area of 4,000 m^{2}, a vineyard of 20,000 m^{2}, and is connected to a small three-hectare tract of countryside by a tree-lined avenue terminating at a rustic house.

== Frescoes ==
On the ground floor, two rooms (facing the garden and flanking the central portico) are frescoed on all their walls with historical scenes—derived from drawings by the Flemish artist Maarten van Heemskerck—framed by trompe-l'œil architectural elements and Corinthian and Solomonic columns. These are the “Hall of Triumphs” (of Peace, Opulence, Time, and Humility) and the “Hall of the Old Testament”, depicting the following biblical episodes: Cain Kills Abel (Genesis 4:8), the Drowning of the Hebrew Children (Exodus 1:22), Saul Orders the Execution of Abimelech (1 Samuel 22:16–18), and The People Threaten to Stone Caleb, Joshua, Moses, and Aaron (Numbers 14:10). The frescoes, dating from the late sixteenth or early seventeenth century, were recovered between 1971 and 1973 and restored in 2007 under the direction of Benedetta Piovesana. The two rectangular rooms, entirely decorated with frescoes, are arranged symmetrically on either side of the portal opening onto the garden.

=== The Hall of Triumphs ===
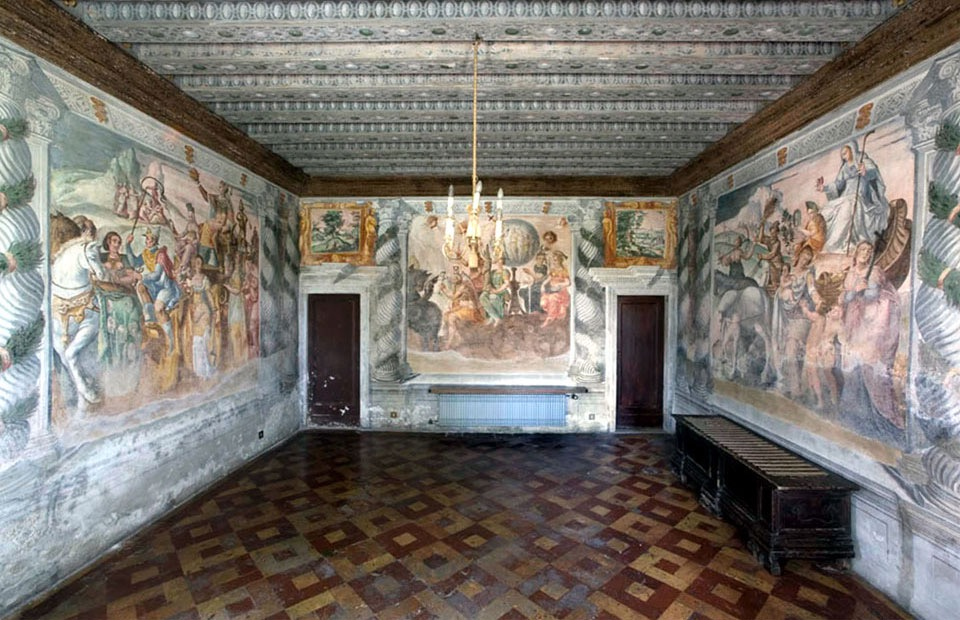
The Hall of Triumphs, frescoed by Maarten van Heemskerck

The Hall of Triumphs presents four allegories within panels framed by a pair of caryatids and twisted Corinthian columns adorned with festoons, supporting a painted entablature above which rises a polychrome alla sansovina ceiling. They depict the Triumph of Peace, the Triumph of Opulence, the Triumph of Time, and the Triumph of Humility, faithful reproductions of four of the nine designs by the Flemish artist Maarten van Heemskerck, freely inspired by Petrarch's Triumphs and intended to illustrate the theme of the vicissitudes of human fortune. Each panel represents a chariot drawn by a pair of horses, surrounded by allegorical personifications.

==== Triumph of Peace ====
Upon the chariot, urged onward by the personification of Love and drawn by two horses symbolising Concord and Utilitas, stands a matronly figure wearing a garland and crown of laurel (Pax), accompanied by a maiden (Opulentia) bearing a sceptre and crown, from which an abundant cornucopia issues forth. Beside the chariot stands a blindfolded figure with a drawn sword (Iustitia), accompanied by a winged figure wearing spurs upon his feet and carrying a long spear (Diligentia).

==== Triumph of Opulence ====
Opulentia is again depicted, bearing a crown and sceptre, accompanied by Superbia, with a convex mirror and peacock feathers, seated above a chariot driven by a male figure (Dolus) and drawn by a pair of horses symbolising Rapine and Fraud. The chariot is surrounded by the figures of Usury, brandishing sacks of coins, Vana Voluptas, and Vana Laetitia, and accompanied by the two-faced personification of Betrayal (Proditio) and Lust (Libido).

==== Triumph of Time ====
The eastern wall is occupied by the triumphal chariot of Time, identified by the traditional attributes of the scythe and hourglass, drawn by a single black horse symbolising Night. Upon the chariot, which carries the inclined sphere of the zodiac, are arranged the personifications of the four elements: Fire, Earth, Air, and Water. The sky is occupied by the four figures of the winds: Zephyrus, Aquilo, Eurus, and Notus.

==== Triumph of Humility ====
The series concludes with the Triumph of Humility, whose chariot, carrying Humility and Peace, is driven by an old man clutching in his hand a thorn-studded scourge symbolising Wisdom (Metis), drawn by Modesty and Meekness, and accompanied by the personification of Hope, who rests an anchor upon her right shoulder and holds a dove in her left hand. At the feet of the chariot are aligned the figures of Faith, carrying a crucifix and chalice, and Charity, accompanied by two children.

==== Pastoral Scenes ====
In addition to the allegories of the Triumphs, the room contains three overdoor panels decorated with pastoral scenes featuring expansive landscapes rendered in meticulous detail. They are enclosed within frames flanked by two female caryatids; the first two are further adorned with two winged putti, while the third is similarly framed.

1. A falcon hunt in which a mounted man is accompanied by a servant armed with a sword and long spear, a dog, and another figure carrying a basket, set within a wooded hilly landscape featuring a large oak, a rural dwelling, and an unidentified turreted structure beneath a leaden sky.
2. A plain and a bridge over a river, flanked by two buildings, forming the backdrop to a reclining female figure conversing with a man carrying a basket on his back.
3. A female traveller asking a seated woman by the roadside for directions; the landscape here is hilly and wooded with oaks, and includes a walled settlement, a suburb outside its walls, and three casoni, characteristic local peasant dwellings.

=== The Hall of the Old Testament ===
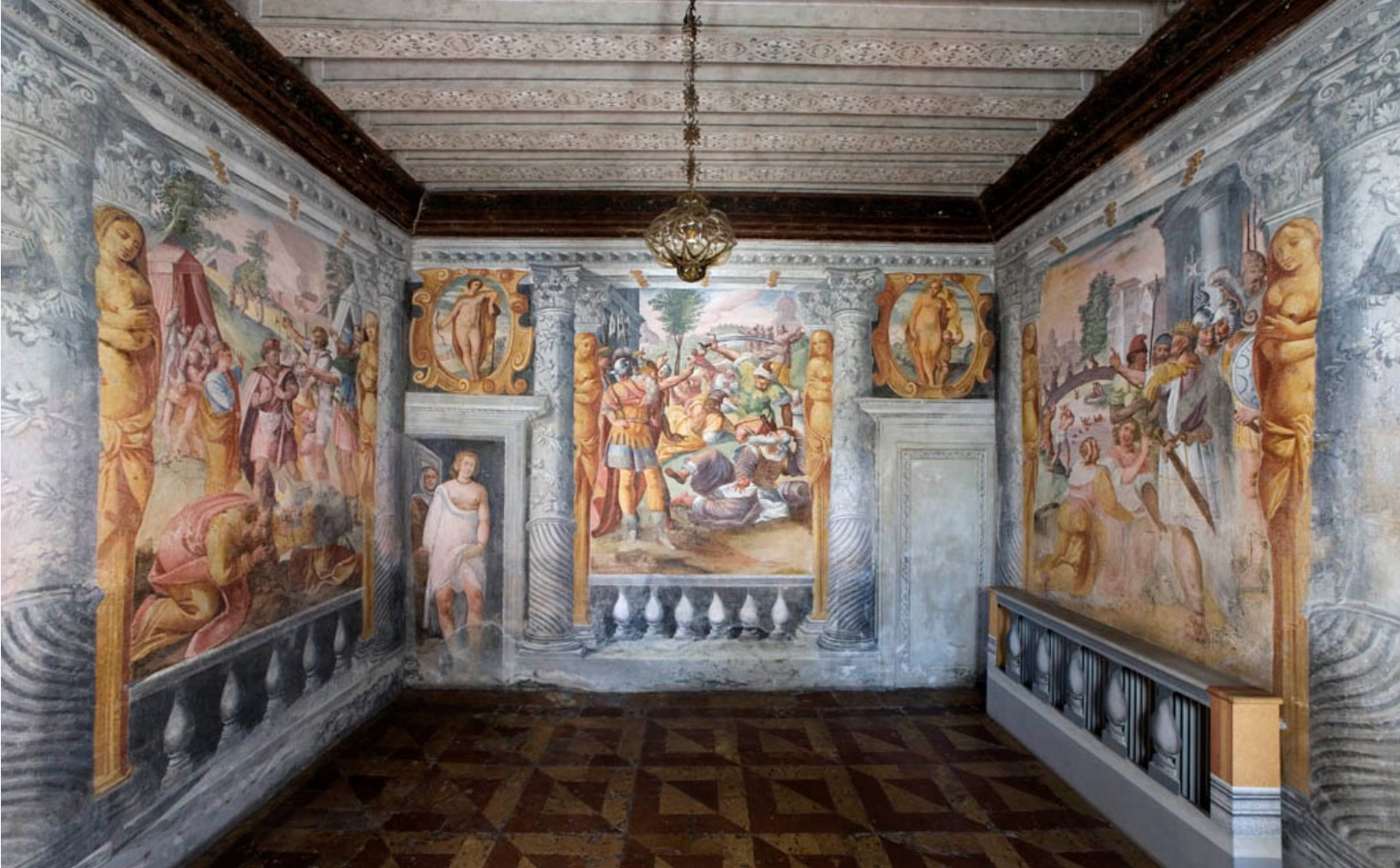
The Hall of the Old Testament, frescoed by Maarten van Heemskerck

The Hall of the Old Testament likewise presents a decorative scheme of balustrades, faux-bronze caryatids, columns, and trompe-l'œil architectural elements, framing four large panels devoted to biblical stories from the Old Testament.

Proceeding counterclockwise from the western wall, we encounter, respectively, the scene of Cain's killing of Abel (Genesis 4:8); the drowning of the male children of the Hebrews (Exodus 1:22) during their captivity in Egypt (two matrons implore Pharaoh, while several executioners hurl the infants into the river; in the background is also depicted the subsequent abandonment of Moses's basket in the river); the beheading of the priest Abimelech, ordered by Saul (First Book of Samuel 22:16–18); and the rebellion of the people of Israel against their leaders following their captivity in Egypt (Aaron and Moses, prostrate upon the ground, are on the point of being stoned, while Joshua and Caleb attempt to appease the anger of the assembly) (Numbers 14:5–10).

The lower margin of each composition bears a brief Latin motto, providing an explanatory or moralising commentary on the scene.

The subjects represented faithfully reproduce the first four engravings from a series of thirteen images entitled Triumphus martyrum, first published in 1591. They provide unusual iconographies of a martyrological character with biblical subjects, whose general meaning, of a Counter-Reformation character, is to be understood in relation to the climate of religious confrontation between Catholics and Protestants that prevailed in the late sixteenth century.

The decoration of this room is likewise completed by four overdoor panels enclosed within gilded cartouches, depicting Venus with Cupid, Diana, Apollo, and, perhaps, Adonis. Upon closer inspection, Adonis can be recognised, naked save for a mantle, having just loosed his arrow, and opposite him the naked Venus with Cupid, who holds a bow and arrow in his hands; Diana is shown in the act of undressing, in a celestial setting, while, against the same background and in a similar setting, a joyful Apollo appears richly dressed and holding in his hand a sceptre, or perhaps a whip.

Finally, from a door painted in trompe-l'œil beneath one of the overdoor panels, a woman emerges wearing a loosened garment that leaves her breast exposed, accompanied by an elderly nurse. This is a “Presentation of the Bride”, a compositional motif of no minor importance in the decoration of the villa, to be understood as an implicit celebration of nuptial values, traditionally associated with the display of female fertility.

=== Combination of sacred and profane ===
In the reconsideration of the matter undertaken by the authors of Oderzo Veneziana: Evoluzione urbana, città dipinta e dimore storiche, it is considered probable that the Hall of Triumphs was commissioned by an original patron, and the Hall of the Old Testament by an heir. The Triumphs, echoing Petrarchan motifs, describe aspects of life (opulence and vanity, humility and virtue, peace in glory, time and the elements of the earth). The Old Testament scenes, by contrast, evoke the brutality of power and command (Cain, Pharaoh, Saul) and the difficulties inherent in their exercise (Moses and Aaron challenged by the people). This is sufficient to suggest that at first there was an inclination to moralise on the conduct of life, within an established and flourishing social order, whereas following the Counter-Reformation the need arose to reaffirm the authority of Catholicism, through the violence of the struggle against heresy and the Lutheran and Calvinist Reformations.

== Bibliography ==
- [2020] Villa Loredan - Ca’ Spinè. Oderzo, in Carlo Barbon, Fotografare. Atmosfere in due dimore storiche nel territorio opitergino mottense: Villa Morosini e Villa Loredan-Ca' Spinè, Associazione Eventi Artistici Treviso, 2020
- [2017] Villa Loredan-Gritti, in Cristina Vendrame, Luciano Mingotto, Maria Teresa Tolotto, Oderzo Veneziana. Evoluzione urbana, città dipinta e dimore storiche, Becco Giallo Editore, pp. 199-209.
- [2012] Cristina Vendrame, Tre residenze storiche opitergine hanno rivelato i tesori nascosti al loro interno, «IL DIALOGO», Anno XLIX - N. 11 - novembre 2012, p. 12
- [2011] Mattia Biffis, Gli affreschi cinquecenteschi di Villa Loredan Gritti in Oderzo, Treviso
- [2009] Gli affreschi nelle ville venete. Il Seicento, a cura di G. Pavanello, V. Mancini, Marsilio, 2009.
- [2001] Istituto Regionale Ville Venete, Villa Gritti, Avogadro, Gradenigo, Spineda, Piovesana: Scheda IRVV 00001284 Ctr 106 NE Iccd A 05.001145116 - Catalogo Provinciale TV 382 (2001) | Scheda Sistema IVV-A_0001629
- [1987] Villa Avogadro, ora Piovesana, in Le ville venete, Catalogo a cura di Giuseppe Mazzotti, Libreria Editrice Canova, 1987 (Ristampa anastatica della III edizione 1954 con premessa di Lionello Puppi), pp. 633-634.
