= Eugenia Romanelli =

Italian author and journalist

Eugenia Romanelli (born March 11, 1972) is an Italian author and journalist.

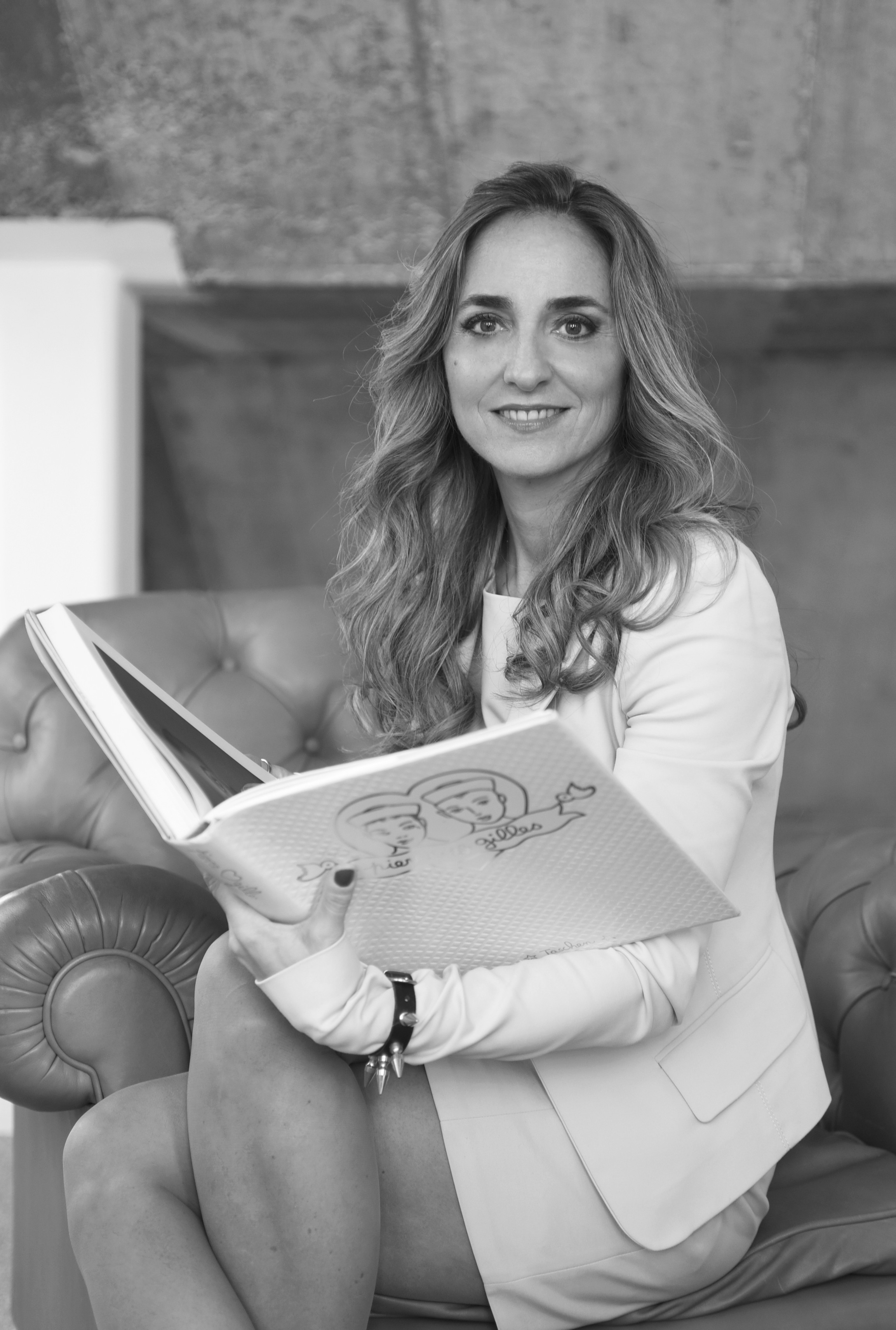
Eugenia Romanelli, Italian author and journalist.

== Biography ==
Romanelli was born in Rome on March 11, 1972. She is the eldest daughter of philosophy teacher, Maria Cristina Marinelli, and historian, Raffaele Romanelli. Due to her father's professional responsibilities she later moved to Florence. She was joined in a civil union with La Repubblica journalist Rory Capelli by Monica Cirinnà. The couple have a daughter. The 2014 court ruling that recognises the double parenthood of the same-sex couple was the second of its kind to be handed down in Italy. It was signed by Judge Melita Cavallo, after the first official technical report on this subject matter written in Italy.

After gaining her high school diploma in Classics in 1990, she enrolled in the Faculty of Philosophy at the University of Florence. In 1997 she obtained her degree in Modern History. She then enrolled in the School of Journalism at the Tor Vergata University in Rome. In 2000, she became a professional journalist.

== Publications ==
In 2001, she published her first novel, Trop Model, inspired by the life of Lorella Giulia Focardi, for the women's erotic series Pizzonero (Borelli). This was followed in 2002 by Vladimir Luxuria, a story (Castelvecchi), the authorized biography of Vladimir Luxuria, a transsexual who guided the artistic management of Muccassassina, a famous disco night organized by the Mario Mieli Homosexual Culture Club in Rome, and in 2006 became the first transgender Member of Parliament elected in Europe.

In 2004, she published La traversata di Emma Costa Rubens (Marotta), which witnesses the introduction of a work methodology based on mixing different sources, including non-literary areas, named the "Bazar Method". In the following years the Bazar Method took hold in an online magazine "Bazarweb.info", in the creation of a creative writing laboratory in the Faculty of Communications Science in the La Sapienza University in Rome (2004–2009), in an online radio (RadioBazar), in a web art gallery (BazArt), managed by Luca Beatrice and in two volumes of collected articles, "Tecniche di comunicazione creativa: il metodo Bazar", with a preface by Mario Morcellini (Pellegrini-Rai Eri, 2005) and "Bazar Cultural brand: comunicare sempre", with a preface by Giulio Anselmi (Pellegrini-Rai Eri, 2007), which constitute one of the first Italian multimedia projects structured as cultural brands. The project won the "Woman is Internet 2005" prize (Web Italia) organized by the Province of Lucca and the Department of Equal Opportunity in partnership with the Ministry of Equal Opportunity, as the best Italian internet site created by women in 2005.

Both collections of essays followed the methodology used during the series of lessons and workshops at the University with alternate inclusions both scientific and poetic, technological and romantic, educational and recreational, from authors of very different extractions: artists, executives, intellectuals, students and academics who all contribute with flashes of infotainment and edutainment. In 2009 she published Con te accanto (Rizzoli), written together with Paola Turci, which revisits the car accident in which the singer was involved, followed in 2011 by Vie di fuga (Dino Audino Publishers), a crime thriller publicized through an original social media campaign featuring a cat called Bianchino Bianchini. In his book review in La Repubblica, Marco Lodoli writes: "The distinguishing feature of writers from the Quentin Tarantino generation is the attempt to describe our liquid reality. Eugenia Romanelli makes the same attempt in Escape routes".

The text incorporates for the first time the theme of bisexuality, which returns in the erotic novel E' scritto nel corpo (2013), which marks the launch of the new crossover literature series BookMe by the De Agostini publishing house, and which introduces the author to a wider readership.

In 2015, Castelvecchi published La donna senza nome, a novel that explores the construction of personal identity of a young woman born to a lesbian couple through artificial insemination using the sperm of an anonymous donor. Melania Mazzucco considers the novel to be a sequel of her own "Sei come sei".

In 2018, the Edizioni ETS publishing house published a collection of essays with the title: "Web, social ed etica. Dove non arriva la privacy: come creare una cultura della riservatezza", edited by Romanelli, with a preface by Massimo Bray. Authors include Vincenzo Vita, Mario Morcellini and the criminologist Marco Lagazzi.

In 2019, Michela Murgia presented the latest novel by Romanelli, Mia, published by Castelvecchi, at the Turin International Book Fair. A suspense without escape, an intelligent thriller that investigates contemporary parenting.

In 2019, she founded, and directs, the first European writing school, Writers Factory, dedicated to the American writer Ursula Le Guin, on the first anniversary of her death. Teachers at the school include, amongst others, David Riondino (the school's deputy director), Roberto D'Agostino, Vladimir Luxuria, Peter Gomez, Giorgio Cavazzano, Vauro Senesi, Milo Manara, Sergio Staino, Stefano Benni, Neri Marcorè, Paolo Virzì, Ascanio Celestini, Margherita Buy, Laura Morante, Romana Petri, Edoardo Albinati, Elena Stancanelli, Donatella Di Pietrantonio, Rosella Postorino, Michela Murgia, Melania Mazzucco, Melissa P., Sandro Veronesi, Giancarlo Leone, Stefano Bollani, Rancore, Marina Rei, Stefano Senardi, Ernesto Assante, Valerio Magrelli, Antonio Padellaro, Giulio Anselmi, Marco Damilano, Bianca Berlinguer, Lucia Annunziata.

In February 2020 sees the publication of the book 'The body of Earth. A denied relationship. From an egological vision to an ecological vision' (Castelvecchi) edited with psychotherapist Giusy Mantione: a book which is the starting point for a crossover movement of intellectuals, scientists, artists, journalists, bloggers and opinion leaders who are engaged in sensitising the Italian collective psyche about the risk of an irreversible change in the global ecosystem.

In June 2020, she launches and directs the online title ReWriters, a multimedia hybrid paper and web-based project. It includes the first Italian Mag-book, a collectible limited edition monthly which is self produced and printed on demand. It includes an art gallery with works donated by artists such as Sten Lex, Lucamaleonte, Giacomo Costa, Federico Solmi, Vauro, ivan, and many others. It also hosts the radio station of Ernesto Assante. It is a sort of cultural movement of secular vocational activists, under an Association with the same name, with the mission of rewriting the images of today's world. Participants include very young supporters as well as known bylines of Italian art and culture, including Gianrico Carofiglio, Giancarlo De Cataldo, Gianna Nannini, Paola Turci, Michele Serra, Carmen Consoli, Carlo Massarini, Marina Rei, Melania Mazzucco, Vinicio Capossela, Achille Bonito Oliva, David Riondino, Massimo Recalcati, Rancore, Piero Pelù, Vauro, Jovanotti, Nancy Brilli, Fridays For Future, and many others. The 2020 ReWriters Award was granted to Paralympian athlete Bebe Vio, whereas the 2021 edition was awarded to Serana Dandini and in 2022 to Loredana Bertè. The scientific committee met for the first time in April 2021 and is composed of: Letizia Battaglia, Luisella Battaglia, Cesare Biasini Selvaggi, Monica Cirinnà, Giancarlo Leone, Riccardo Magi, Giovanna Melandri, Lidia Ravera, Niccolò Rinaldi, Barbara Santoro. The first edition of ReWriters fest. was organised in Rome, at WeGil, with the support of the Ministry of Culture and the Lazio Region. Amongst others, participants included Drusilla Foer, Max Gazzè, Greg, Giovanni Scifoni, Edoardo Albinati, Luca Barbarossa, Federica Cacciola-Martina Dell'Ombra, Livio Beshir, Pino Strabioli, Karma B., Michela Andreozzi, and many Italian activists including Annalisa Corrado, Paola Di Nicola, Giulia Blasi, Maura Cossutta, Riccardo Magi, Susanna Camusso, Francesco Ferrante, Rossella Muroni, Christian Raimo, Barbara Masini, as well as about a hundred professionals like Anna Oliverio Ferraris and Arturo Di Corinto.

Since 2020, she is a member of the Scientific Committee of the Italian Language Festival.

== Academia ==
From 2004 to 2009 she was a lecturer in Creative Writing at the La Sapienza University in Rome. Since 2010, together with Giulio Anselmi, she has been a lecturer in Theory and Techniques of Journalism at the LUISS Guido Carli University. Since 2011 she has been teaching Communication and New Media at the Silvio D'Amico Academy of Dramatic Arts, courses which includes research into the language of the "digital revolution" which resulted in the publication of a collection of essays Tre punto zero, edited for Dino Audino Publishers (2011). Since 2015, she has been teaching Business Writing and Social Media Management at the School of Corporate Science in Florence, and Advanced Communication at the University of Florence (NEMECH, New Media for Cultural Heritage project). Since 2016, she has been organizing courses for professional development at the Italian National Press Association for the Order of Journalists, Lazio Region. She manages the "New Journalism and Blogging" Master course at the Adams Experimental Photography Centre in Rome.

== Journalism ==
During her university studies she started writing for a feminist magazine, Noi donne. Since 2000, she has been writing for various Italian publications, including La Repubblica, L'Espresso, Il Messaggero, L'Unità, Il Fatto Quotidiano and for the ANSA press agency. In 2003 she was the Italian Country Manager for the international magazine Time Out. In 2004 she founded and managed the online cultural news publication Bazarweb, and 2010 she managed the cultural section of the Il Fatto Quotidiano newspaper, SmarTime, subsequently transformed into a blog. In 2014 she inaugurated her blog dedicated to homosexual parentage in the Il Fatto Quotidiano newspaper, and in 2016, a blog dedicated to underground and digital art and culture called Borderline for the L'Espresso magazine. Since 2017, she has been writing for Vanity Fair and she is an author for Treccani.

== Works ==
=== Novels ===
- Mia, novel, Castelvecchi, Roma, 2019, ISBN 978-88-3282-634-0
- La donna senza nome, novel, Castelvecchi, Roma, 2015, ISBN 88-7394-003-X
- È scritto nel corpo, novel, De Agostini, Novara, 2013, ISBN 978-88-418-9685-3
- 2BX. Essere un'incognita, novel, De Agostini, Novara, 2012, ISBN 978-88-418-7382-3
- Vie di fuga, novel, Dino Audino Editore, Roma, 2011, ISBN 978-88-7527-199-2
- with Paola Turci, Con te accanto, novel, Rizzoli, Milano, 2009, ISBN 978-88-17-02944-5
- La traversata di Emma Costa Rubens, novel, Marotta, 2004, ISBN 88-7631-009-6
- Vladimir Luxuria. Una storia, novel, Castelvecchi, Roma, 2002, ISBN 88-7394-003-X
- Trop Model, short stories (Ed. Borelli 2001), ISBN 88-86721-39-0

=== Non fiction ===
- (a cura di), Il corpo della terra. La negazione negata. Da una visione egologica a una visione ecologica, collection of essays, Castelvecchi Editore, Rome, 2020, ISBN 9788832828719
- (a cura di), Web, social ed etica. Dove non arriva la privacy: come creare una cultura della riservatezza, collection of essays, with a preface by Massimo Bray, ETS Edizioni, PISA, Roma, 2018, ISBN 978-884675338-0
- (a cura di), Tre punto zero, collection of essays, with a preface by Giulio Anselmi, Dino Audino Editore, Roma, 2011, ISBN 978-88-7527-188-6
- con Marco Piazza, Sfide da vincere, interviews, Giunti, Firenze, 2008, ISBN 978-88-09-06304-4
- (a cura di), Bazar Cultural brand: comunicare sempre, collection of essays, with a preface by Giulio Anselmi, Pellegrini-Rai Eri, Roma, 2007
- (a cura di), Tecniche di comunicazione creativa: il metodo Bazar, collection of essays, with a preface by Mario Morcellini, Pellegrini-Rai Eri, 2005
