= Ida Vassalini =

Italian writer and pacifist (1891–1953)

- Born: 1 November 1891; Verona, Italy
- Died: 21 December 1953 (aged 62); Milan, Italy
- Occupations: Teacher, philosopher, pacifist, and poet

Ida Vassalini (1 November 1891 – 21 December 1953) was an Italian teacher, philosopher, pacifist, and poet. She was born and raised in Verona, before moving to Milan to further her education. Earning a degree in philology from the University of Padua and another in philosophy from the University of Milan, Vassalini became a teacher at several high schools in and around Milan and contributed to various literary and social journals. A committed pacifist, although not a feminist, she became the head of the Milanese branch of the Women's International League for Peace and Freedom (WILPF) from 1922 to 1927, but left when the organization did not oppose the execution of Sacco and Vanzetti.

Many of Vassalini's works focused on Asian studies, in particular, translating Indian religious texts into Italian like the Upanishads, the Bhagavad Gita and the Dhammapada. She wrote poetry and literary critiques of other philosophers, including Giuseppe Rensi, Arthur Schopenhauer, and Rabindranath Tagore. Her original works produced a fusion of Eastern philosophy and Christian teachings, which mirrored her own beliefs that the Eastern and Western worlds should unite to achieve social justice. She was an anti-Communist, anti-fascist, and anti-nationalist, who believed that intellectual pursuits should not be influenced by religion or politics.

== Early life and education ==
Ida Vassalini was born on 1 November 1891 in Verona, Italy, to Itala (née Abati) and Bartolomeo Vassalini. She studied at the Liceo Maffei, gaining an interest in classical and oriental philology, literature, and philosophy. One of her instructors, Antonio Belloni, encouraged her to write poetry. After completing high school, she went on to study philology at the University of Padua and earned a second degree in philosophy from the University of Milan. Her instructors, philosophers Piero Martinetti and Giuseppe Rensi, encouraged her to study Eastern philosophy.

== Career ==
Upon finishing her schooling, Vassalini began working as a philosophy teacher in Milan. She taught at the Calchi Taeggi Gymnasium in the Palazzo Calchi, the Giosuè Carducci State Gymnasium, and the Alessandro Manzoni Classical High School. Simultaneously, she began publishing in various literary journals on language and philosophy and in social magazines about societal issues, such as Coenobium (Community), Giornale della donna (Lady's Journal), and Luci e Ombra (Light and Shade). She wrote articles in support of pacifism for the journal La Vita Internazionale (International Life). Vassalini supported European integration and internationalism, including the policies advocated by diplomat Carlo Sforza. Another influence was her friendship with the political activist and anti-fascist Aldo Capitini.

In 1919, Vassalini joined the Women's International League for Peace and Freedom (WILPF), and became the chair of the Milanese chapter in 1922. She was chosen as the Italian delegate to the 1924 WILPF Congress held in Washington, D.C., but because of illness could not attend and was replaced by Virginia Tango Piatti. She was also unable to attend the 1926 WILPF Congress held in Paris. Instead, she sent a long missive advocating for world disarmament. She wrote to Madeleine Doty, general secretary of the International WILPF branch, explaining the difficulties of organizing and meeting with other pacifists because of the oppressive and intolerant political environment of the fascist regime. She left organization in 1927 because WILPF had refused to oppose the execution of Sacco and Vanzetti and press for international legislation against the death penalty.

Vassalini was uncompromising in her values. Although she was a member of WILPF, she supported neither feminist nor communist positions, believing men and women were not antagonists or equal in all respects. Instead, she saw all people as companions who should work together in the name of social justice. The answers to solving life's mysteries, according to Vassalini, depended on uniting the East with the West. She risked losing her job when she became the only person in her school to refuse membership in the Associazione Nazionale Fascista (National Fascist Association). Her decision also meant that her ability to publish was curtailed and she was isolated from other activists who found her positions too rigid and were fearful of openly opposing the regime. She participated in reforming the bylaws of the Società Letteraria di Verona (Literary Society of Verona) in 1945, to ensure that the organization remained focused on intellectual pursuits uninfluenced by religion or politics. When the society elected her as deputy librarian, Vassalini refused to serve because she was not living in Verona.

== Works ==
Vassalini published a pedagogical children's textbook Ascoltiamo i fanciulli (We Listen to the Children) in 1921. (Note: Suriano states that the name of the textbook was Ascoltiamo i bambini, but other texts identify it as Ascoltiamo i fanciulli.) Her most important works were in regard to her Asian studies. Theologian Romano Guardini recognized her ability to fuse the philosophy of Indian masters and Christian teachings. In 1920, she published "Nota a Kalidasa" ("Note to Kalidasa") regarding poetic interpretation of poet Kalidasa's works. Three years later, Vassalini translated Rabindranath Tagore's 1917 work "Nationalism in India", which condemned nationalism as contrary to cooperation and brotherhood. Her article "L'uno e I molti" ("The One and the Many"), published in 1929, analyzed passages from the Upanishads. Between 1933 and 1945, she worked on translating portions of the Bhagavad Gita from Sanskrit and after their publication, she translated the Tat Tvam Asi, and the Dhammapada from the Pali language.

Besides her translations, Vassalini published poems and other works, such as Liriche del dubbio (Lyrics of Doubt, 1931), In memoriam (1937), and In memoria di Giuseppe Rensi (In Memory of Giuseppe Rensi, 1942). Her article "Essere e non essere" ("To Be and Not To Be", 1920) was a critique of interpretations of Arthur Schopenhauer's work. "Pacifismo e scetticismo – Rileggendo i «Lineamenti di Filosofia scettica»" ("Pacifism and Skepticism – Re-reading the Outlines of Skeptical Philosophy"), was written as a critical dialogue with her teacher Rensi's 1917 work. She later wrote two other works responding to his teachings. "Lo scetticismo di Giuseppe Rensi" ("The Skepticism of Giuseppe Rensi", 1941) was a complete evaluation of his body of work and "Verso un'occulta armonia suprema?" ("Towards a Supreme Occult Harmony?, 1952) was a retrospective rethinking of his philosophy.

== Death and legacy ==
Vassalini died on 21 December 1953, in Milan. She is remembered for her work in support of universal freedom and justice. After her death, scant attention was paid to her work until the twenty-first century. Professor Elisabetta Zampini received the Fratelli Vassallini Prize in 2016 from the Instituto Veneto di scienze, lettere ed arti (Veneto Institute of Sciences, Letters and Arts) for her biographical work, Nel grido d'una gioia: la voce di Ida Vassalini (Verona 1891 – Milano 1953) (The Cry of Joy: The Voice of Ida Vassalini (Verona 1891 – Milan 1953), which revived the life and work of Vassalini.
