= Gritti =

Gritti is an Italian surname. Notable people with the surname include:

- Aloisio Gritti (died 1534), Venetian noble
- Andrea Gritti (1455–1538), Doge of Venice
- Carillo Gritti (1942–2016), Brazilian Roman Catholic bishop
- Cornelia Barbaro Gritti (1719–1808), Venetian poet and salon-holder
- Lodovico Gritti (1480–1534), Venetian politician
- Matteo Gritti (born 1980), Italian footballer
- Triadan Gritti, 15th-century Venetian nobleman, diplomat and military officer
