= A Perfect Day (2008 film) =

- Italian: Un giorno perfetto
- Directed by: Ferzan Özpetek
- Written by: Ferzan Özpetek; Melania Mazzucco; Sandro Petraglia
- Produced by: Domenico Procacci
- Starring: Valerio Mastandrea; Isabella Ferrari; Monica Guerritore; Nicole Grimaudo; Valerio Binasco; Angela Finocchiaro; Federico Costantini; Stefania Sandrelli
- Cinematography: Fabio Zamarion
- Edited by: Patrizio Marone
- Music by: Andrea Guerra
- Production company: Fandango
- Distributed by: 01 Distribution
- Release date: 5 September 2008
- Running time: 100 minutes
- Country: Italy
- Language: Italian

A Perfect Day (Italian: Un giorno perfetto) is a 2008 Italian thriller film directed by Ferzan Özpetek. It is based on a novel with the same name by Melania Mazzucco.

It entered the competition at the 65th Venice International Film Festival.

== Plot ==
Antonio and Emma have been separated for years, but he does not accept when Emma dates other men. Indeed, Antonio proves obsessive, aggressive and intrusive, and again threatens Emma to hurt the children: little Kevin, shy and introverted, and the adolescent Valentina. Emma tolerates the harassment of Antonio, and the situation seems to recover. However one evening Antonio asks his ex-wife to entrust him with their children for an evening at a pizzeria. Antonio has a diabolical plan, and when he returns home with Kevin and Valentina, he pulls out a gun and shoots both of his children, and finally commits suicide. Emma rushes desperately to them, and discovers that her daughter is still alive.

== Cast ==
- Isabella Ferrari as Emma Tempesta Buonocore
- Valerio Mastandrea as Antonio Buonocore
- Nicole Grimaudo as Maja Fioravanti
- Federico Costantini as Aris Fioravanti
- Valerio Binasco as Elio Fioravanti
- Monica Guerritore as Mara
- Stefania Sandrelli as Olimpia Tempesta
- Nicole Murgia as Valentina Buonocore
- Gabriele Paolino as Kevin Buonocore
- Angela Finocchiaro as Silvana
- Giulia Salerno as Camilla Fioravanti
- Milena Vukotic as Professoressa di Aris
