= Palazzo Calchi =

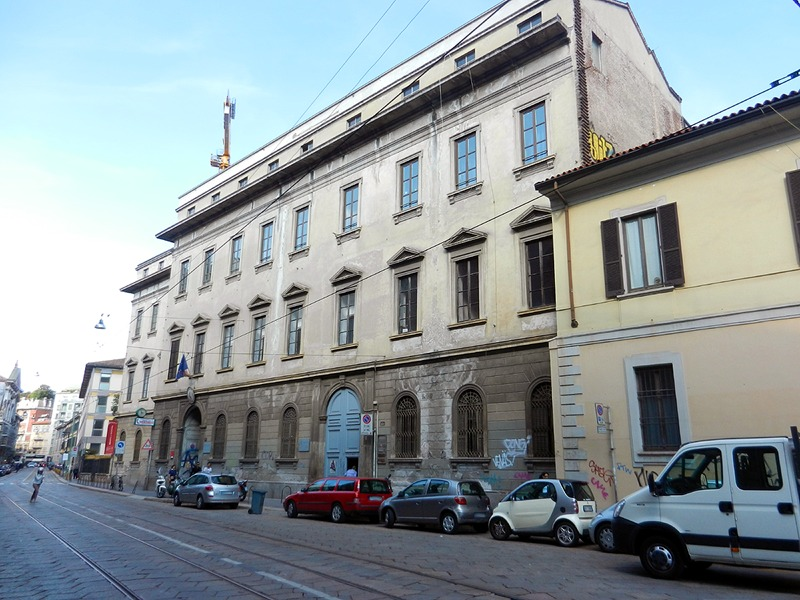
- Facade of the Palazzo Calchi in via Corso di Porta Vigentina 15a
- Interactive map of the Palazzo Calchi area
- Alternative names: Palazzo Calchi Taeggi

General information
- Status: public
- Type: Palace
- Architectural style: Neoclassical architecture
- Location: Milan, Italy, 15a, Corso di Porta Vigentina 15a
- Coordinates: 45.454224°N 9.196377°E
- Construction started: 1506

Design and construction
- Architect: Monaci Scolari

Palazzo Calchi (or palazzo Calchi Taeggi) is a historic neoclassical architecture palace in Milan, located in corso di Porta Vigentina, formerly home to the Calchi-Taeggi college.

== History and description ==
The Palazzo Calchi Taeggi complex dates back to the 16th century. It originally housed the monastery of San Bernardo, until 1506 by Benedictine nuns governed by the Cistercian Fathers of Clairvaux, then by Dominican nuns. A palace rich in history and stories of neglect (including the collapse in 1971 of the church of San Bernardino, of which only 3 arches of the right aisle survive), it links its name to the Calchi family, a noble family from Pavia, and to Giovanni Ambrogio Taegio (d.1553), a Milanese nobleman, who had ordered the foundation of the two respective colleges, later aggregated.

At first it was a convent (in what remains of the monastery courtyard, now the reading garden of the local public library, there are still centenary fig and medlar trees under which one can read and study) and the beautiful 16th-century inner courtyard. It enjoys a privileged history in the Milanese scene and was the scene of many important events It later became an important college where many prominent figures of Catholic culture taught and where Emilio De Marchi also taught two years after graduating in the last century. It was also the scene of the revolutionary uprisings of the Five Days of Milan, where students and professors united together in the name of freedom. Having become a barracks and later a music school, recent agreements have been made between the Municipality of Milan, which will move its Municipal 1 offices there, and the Customs Authority. It is home to a library, a school and various city associations. It hosted during the pandemic the association that took in people living on the streets at night. The building is owned by the public property of the Municipality of Milan; in spring 2022 it has been announced that it is scheduled to be refurbished.

== Bibliography ==
=== Italian sources ===
- Sara Fasoli, Milano Benefica, Memoria e tradizione storica, Milano, Istituto di assistenza ai Minori e agli Anziani e Nexo, 2007.
- Beniamino Gutierrez e Avancinio Avancini, Il Collegio Convitto Calchi-Taeggi di Milano, Milano, Presso il Collegio Convitto Calchi-Taeggi, 1916.
- Prof. Ugo Guido Mondolfo, Il Collegio Convitto Calchi - Taeggi di Milano attraverso quattro secoli (1516 - 1916), 1916.
