= Ida Baccini =

Italian writer (1850–1911)

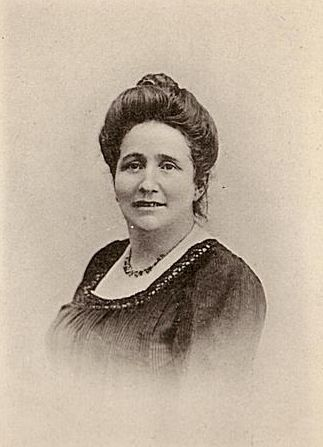
- Born: May 16, 1850; Florence, Italy
- Died: February 28, 1911 (aged 60); Florence, Kingdom of Italy
- Writing career
- Genre: Children's literature

Ida Baccini (16 May 1850 – 28 February 1911) was an Italian writer for children. Baccini was editor-in-chief of Cordelia, a journal for girls published from 1884 to 1911.

The magazine was created in 1881 by Nobel Prize nominee Angelo De Gubernatis (1840–1913). On the death of Baccini in 1911, Maria Majocchi became the new editor-in-chief.

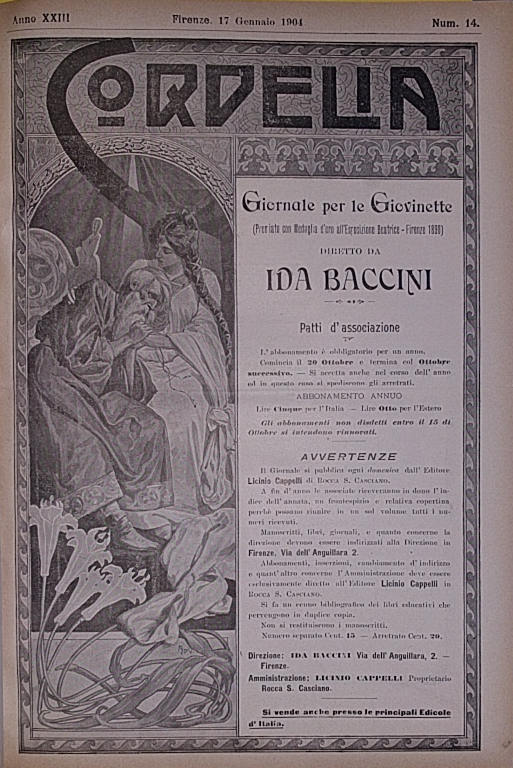

According to Bloom, "the magazine, despite its success in its first years of publishing, reached a wider audience over time during the editorship of Ida Baccini and, later, that of Maria Maiocchi Plattis, better known by her pen name, Jolanda. This later success can be attributed to the ability of these two editors to create a recognizable product as well as to the relationship that they managed to establish with their young readers."

== Works ==
- Le memorie di un pulcino (1875)
- Avventure di un pulcino, pubblicazione postuma a cura di Adamo D'Agostino, San Donato Val di Comino, ed. Psiche e Aurora, 2011. ISBN 9788889875360.
- Come andò a finire il pulcino, pubblicazione postuma, Firenze, ed. R. Bemporad & figlio, 1926, pp. 130; Firenze, ed. Marzocco, 1939, pp. 100.
- Le Future Mogli, Firenze, 1895, pp 218; Firenze, ed. Succ. Le Monnier, 1912, pp. 218.
- I Piccoli viaggiatori: viaggio nella China, Firenze, ed. R. Bemporad, 1907, pp. 173.
- Commediole e monologhi: per bimbe e bambini, Livorno, ed. Giusti, 1905, pp. 192.
- I tre scudieri di Orlando, Palermo, ed. Biondo, 1904, pp. 24.
- La società misteriosa, Palermo, ed. Biondo, 1903, pp. 24.
- Una famiglia di gatti: romanzo per fanciulli, Torino, ed. G.B. Paravia e comp., 1899, pp. 142; Torino, ed. Ditta G.B. Paravia e comp., 1903, pp. 140.
- Il romanzo d'una maestra, prima edizione nel 1901.
- Per le veglie invernali: storie allegre e storie meste, Torino, ed. Paravia, 1901, pp. 141.
- Una famiglia di saltimbanchi, prima edizione nel 1901.
- * Baccini, Ida (1901). Il diamante di Paolino (storiella misteriosa). Palermo: Casa editrice Salvatore Biondo., ristampa Invictus Editore, 2016. ISBN 9781536864991.
- Vorrei fare il signore: novelle, prima edizione illustrata da Carlo Linzaghi, Genova, ed. Donath, 1901, pp. 244.
- Il libro delle novelle, Firenze, ed. Salani, 1900, pp. 232.
- Angeli del cielo e angeli della terra, con disegni di Carlo Chiostri, prima pubblicazione Firenze, ed. Salani, 1900.
- Quinte letture per le classi elementari femminili: compilate in ordine agli ultimi programmi governativi, con vignette, Firenze, ed. R. Bemporad, 1891, pp. 285.

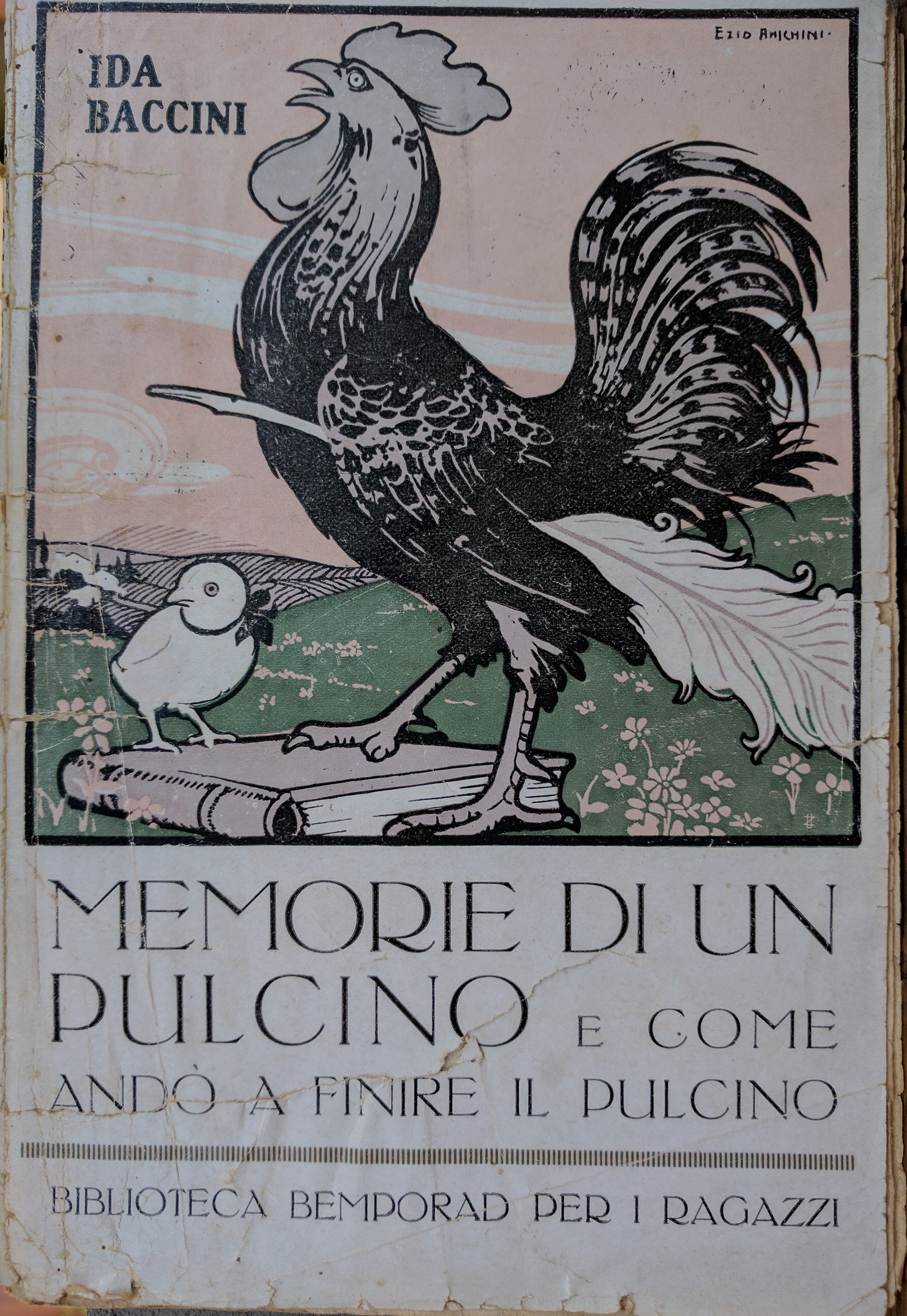
Memorie di un pulcino

- Il sogno di Giulietta: fantasia dantesca, Firenze, ed. G. Ademollo, 1887, pp. 160; Milano, ed. Fratelli Treves, 1896, pp. 130.
- Tonino in calzon lunghi con altri racconti pei ragazzi, prima pubblicazione Firenze, ed. Salani, 1896, pp. 214.
- Nuove quarte letture: per le classi elementari femminili, Firenze, ed. Bemporad, 1898, pp. 176.
- Lezioncine di cose usuali, Torino, ed. G. B. Paravia e Comp., 1896, pp. 128.
- La vita dei bambini, Milano, ed. Hoepli, 1896.
- L'abito nero è di rigore e L'imperatore e l'abate: racconti pei ragazzi, Milano, ed. Carrara, 1896, pp. 186.
- Oh! I miei tempi!, Firenze, ed. Chiesi, 1894, pp. 275.
- Angelo di pace: romanzo educativo, Firenze, ed. Successori le Monnier, 1894, pp. 244; Firenze, ed. Le Monnier, 1901, pp. 244.
- Come si diventa uomini, Libro per la seconda e terza elementare compilato sulle norme dei Programmi governativi approvati col R. Decreto del 25 settembre 1888, Bocca S. Casciano, ed. Licinio Cappelli, 1893, pp. 176.
- Il novelliere delle signorine, Milano, ed. C. Chiesa e F. Guindani, 1892, pp. 352.
- Prime letture composte da una mamma ad uso delle prime classi elementari, Firenze, ed. Bemporad & figlio, 1890, pp. 56.
- Storia di una donna narrata alle giovinette, illustrazioni di Enrico Mazzanti, Firenze, ed. Paggi, 1889, pp. 145.
- La storia di Firenze narrata a scuola, Firenze, ed. Felice Paggi, 1889, pp. 176.
- Figurine e racconti: nuovo libro di lettura, Firenze, ed. Paggi, 1887, pp. 161.
- Per i più piccini, Milano, ed. E. Trevisini, 1887, pp. 94.
- Libro moderno ossia nuove letture per la gioventù, Torino, ed. G. B. Paravia e Comp, 1887, pp. 254.
- Felice ad ogni costo! Assassino? – Fogli d'album: novelle per le giovinette, Firenze, ed. Ademollo, 1886, pp. 120.
- Racconti (Perfida Mignon!, Il povero Cecco, Quel che avvenne al signor Gaetano la notte di Natale), con illustrazioni di A. Sezanne, G. Amato e F. Mazzanti, Milano, ed. Fratelli Treves, 1886, pp. 119.
- Un'ora di svago, illustrato da Enrico Mazzanti, Firenze, ed. Successori Le Monnier, 1886, pp. 134.
- La fanciulla massaia, prima edizione nel 1885.
- Manfredo: libro di lettura e di premio, Milano, ed. Carrara, 1885, pp. 188.
- Strenna della Cordelia, Firenze, ed. C. Ademollo, 1885, pp. 244.
- Quarte letture per le classi elementari maschili, Firenze, ed. F. Paggi, 1885, pp. 188.
- Passeggiando coi miei bambini, con disegni di Enrico Mazzanti, Milano, ed. Treves, 1884.
- Un dottore in erba, Milano, ed. Carrara, 1884, pp. 30.
- Per le strade, Milano, ed. Paolo Carrara, 1884, pp. 30.
- Amor figliale (lettere), Milano, ed. Carrara, 1884, pp. 28.
- Nuovi racconti, Firenze, ed. Le Monnier, 1884, pp. 249 (prima pubblicazione).
- Fanciulla massaia: libro di lettura per le scuole femminili elementari superiori, Firenze, Paggi, 1883, pp. 187.
- Lezioni e racconti per i bambini. Milano: Trevisini Editore. 1882.
- Il libro del mio bambino. Libro di lettura per gli asili infantili e per le prime classi elementari, Firenze, Tip. Editrice della Gazzetta D'Italia, 1881, pp. 131; Firenze, ed. Paggi, 1884, pp. 134.
- Memorie di un pulcino, prima edizione italiana R. Bemporad & figlio nel 1875; tradotto in polacco Pamiętnik kurczątka, 1931.
- Cristoforo Colombo: racconto per la gioventù, Torino, Paravia, data pubblicazione indefinita.
