= Maria Majocchi =

Italian writer, journalist, and publisher

Maria Majocchi Plattis
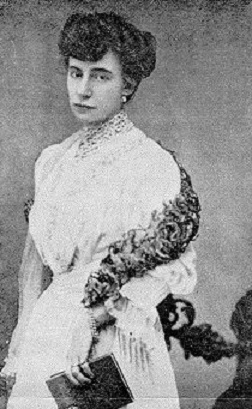
- Born: Maria Majocchi; 23 April 1864; Cento, Kingdom of Italy
- Died: 8 August 1917 (aged 53); Cento, Kingdom of Italy
- Other names: Margheritina di Cento, Jolanda, Marchesa Maria Plattis
- Occupations: Writer; journalist; editor
- Spouse: Marquis Fernando Plattis
- Children: Giovan Battista Plattis
- Parents: Antonio Majocchi (1831–1907) (father); Lavinia Agnoletti (1839–1911) (mother)

Maria Majocchi, also spelled Maiocchi (23 April 1864 – 8 August 1917), was an Italian writer, journalist, and publisher. She wrote under several Pseudonyms, the most common being Jolanda, Viola d'Alba, and Margheritina di Cento.

== Biography ==
Majocchi was the daughter of musician and politician Antonio Majocchi (1831–1907), one-time mayor of Cento, and his wife Lavinia Agnoletti (1839–1911), who had a rich literary, linguistic, and musical background. Majocchi had two sisters, Clementina Laura (known by her pseudonym Bruna) and Gabriella.

Majocchi was a writer, journalist, and editor. In 1882, she published under the pseudonym Jolanda, which she borrowed from a character in the opera Una Partita a Scacchi ("A Game of Chess") by Giuseppe Giacosa.

=== Author ===
Majocchi was very knowledgeable in the English language. At 17, Majocchi was known for translating stories in the magazine Maccies Model from French to Italian.

Majocchi also subscribed to some Italian magazines, but one in particular attracted her attention: Cordelia. Cordelia was published from 1881 to 1884 by Angelo de Gubernatis, who would become Majocchi's lifelong friend and collaborator. In Cordelia's first issue, De Gubernatis invited his young readers to send "a little thing done there" to the editorial staff for publication. Majocchi responded immediately with her first poetic sketch, "Il fior della ventura" (The Flower of Fortune), which was published under her first pseudonym, Margheritina di Cento, on 12 February 1882. After her initial publication, she was a regular contributor to the magazine with a fixed starting salary of 5 lire per page. Her signature appeared at the bottom of each piece.

Her first stories, which were originally published in installments, were collected for publication in later years as single volumes: Dal mio verziere (From My Orchard), Critical essays (Rocca San Casciano, 1896) and Le Ignote (The Unknowns) (Bologna, 1899).

=== Married life ===
On 8 December 1884, Majocchi married the Marquis Ferdinando Plattis, a young man from Padua, and she moved to San Giovanni in Persiceto. They had a son named Giovan Battista Plattis, whom they called Gino. In a letter written to De Gubernatis, she assured him that her collaboration with Cordelia would not be interrupted because of her marriage. Ferdinando died on 5 May 1893 following a brief illness. Economic difficulties forced Majocchi to intensify her writing work. She sent Gino to De Gubernatis for a time for him to continue his studies.

Until the end of the 1800s, she was a widely known author. She won a succession of awards and watched new editions and reprints of her volumes become available. She also expanded her range of collaborations with magazines and newspapers, conferences, public speeches, participation in humanitarian activities and new editorial experiences.

=== Editor-in-chief ===
Having been a collaborator with Cordelia since the first issue, Majocchi assumed the vacant position of editor-in-chief in 1911 after the death of editor Ida Baccini. She became the third person to hold that position for the magazine. She made immediate changes in hopes of improving readership and encouraging her subscribers to become more avid readers and writers.

According to Bloom, her efforts were a success:

The magazine, despite its success in its first years of publishing, reached a wider audience over time during the editorship of Ida Baccini and, later, that of Maria Maiocchi Plattis, better known by her pen name, Jolanda. This later success can be attributed to the ability of these two editors to create a recognizable product as well as to the relationship that they managed to establish with their young readers.

Under Majocchi's leadership, Cordelia met with "unusual success" and, by 1913, its subscriber base reached about 10,000, according to Bloom.

Majocchi also took on philanthropic roles and founded an association to collect books for prisoners. The success of that initiative spurred the formation of other associations and activities, such as making Cordelia available in braille to expand its reach to blind patrons. She was also instrumental in creating several conferences.

=== Death ===
Majocchi was actively engaged in the education of young female readers until her death in Cento on 8 August 1917.

A street near Cento's city center is named in her honor using several of her names: Via Jolanda Maria Maiocchi Plattis.
