= Maria Tore Barbina =

Italian poet and translator

Maria Tore Barbina (22 July 1940, Udine – 28 August 2007) was an Italian poet and translator. She was a teacher of Latin Literature at the University of Trieste and of Latin Paleography at University of Udine.

== Bibliography ==
- Dizionario pratico e illustrato Italiano-Friulano (Agraf, Udine 1980) / Practical and Illustrated Italian-Friulan Dictionary /
- Saggio sulle scrittrici in lingua italiana (Rebellato, Torre di Mosto 1984) /Essay on female writers in Italian language /
- La condizione femminile da documenti friulani dell'età dei castelli (Udine 1988) / Female condition from Friulan document from the age of the castles /
- Vocabolario della lingua friulana Italiano-Friulano (Verbi editore, Udine 1991) / Vocabulary of Friulan language Italian-Friulan /
- Diplomi del monastero benedettino di S. Maria di Aquileia (Biblioteca Comunale di Verona, ms. 707)" (Gruppo Archeologico Aquileiese 2000)

Poems

- Oltre il silenzio (afterword by Maria Grazia Lenisa) (DARS, Udine 2001)
- D'amore e d'altro poco (afterword by Maria Grazia Lenisa) (Bastogi, Foggia 2002)
- Furlanis (preface by Gianfranco D'Aronco) (Campanotto Editore, Udine 2004)
- Cjantant l'amôr in rimis - Madrigai (afterword by Maria Grazia Lenisa) (Campanotto Editore, Udine 2007)

Friulian translations

- Aristophanes "Lisistrate" (La Nuova Base, Udine 1985)
- Gaspara Stampa "Rimis di Amôr" (La Nuova Base, Udine 1985)
- Emily Dickinson "Poesiis" (La Nuova Base, Udine 1986)
