= Virginia Tango Piatti =

Italian writer and activist (1869–1958)

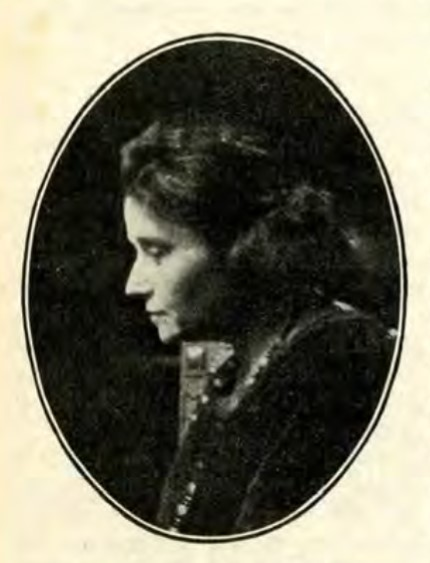
- Tango Piatti in 1925
- Born: Virginia Sofia Cristina Emilia Maria Tango; 21 September 1869; Florence, Kingdom of Italy
- Died: 1 July 1958 (aged 88); Lugano, Ticino, Switzerland
- Other name: Virginia Piatti-Tango
- Occupations: Writer; activist
- Years active: 1905–1952
- Spouse: Antonio Piatti (m. 1905)

Virginia Tango Piatti (pen name Agar; 21 September 1869 – 1 July 1958) was an Italian writer, pacifist, anti-fascist, and women's rights activist. Born in Florence, the family settled in Rome in 1897, where she was briefly schooled by nuns. She moved to Milan in 1904 to help with the education of her sister's children and met the painter Antonio Piatti, whom she married in 1905. Although she had begun writing around the time of her marriage, it became her livelihood in 1911, when she separated from her husband. She adopted the pen name Agar at that time, publishing poems, children's stories and articles about pacifism in various journals. Her outspokenness against fascism led to her registration as a subversive and her self-exile to Paris.

From 1920, Tango Piatti was involved in the activities of the Women's International League for Peace and Freedom (WILPF) and the leader of the Florence branch of the organization. She attended the 1921 WILPF Congress in Vienna and the 1924 Congress held in Washington, D.C. Although selected as a delegate for the 1926 Dublin Congress and for a workshop held that year in Bourneville, France, she was unable to secure travel documents. Her passport was confiscated in 1927, preventing her from attending the 1929 Prague Congress. In 1933, she fled to Paris, using a ruse that she was going there to organize an exhibition of her husband's paintings. Because he was a strong supporter of the fascist regime and they had not legally separated, she was granted a visa. In Paris, her apartment became the center of the anti-fascist group Giustizia e Libertà (Justice and Freedom). In 1939, she returned for a brief visit to Italy, but was unable to leave the country and return to France. She was arrested in 1943 for anti-fascist actions and imprisoned in Florence for several months. When the war ended, she settled in Lugano, Switzerland, where she died in 1958. In the 21st century, scholarship has recovered the role of pacifist feminists in promoting internationalism and opposing fascism in the period between the World Wars.

== Early life and education ==
Virginia Sofia Cristina Emilia Maria Tango was born on 21 September 1869, in Florence, then in the Kingdom of Italy, to Paola Tarizzo Borgialli and Vincenzo Tango. Her father was a nobleman from Naples, who worked for the royal court in the finance division and in 1897 became the Attorney General of the Court of Auditors in Rome. Her mother was a noblewoman from Turin and the daughter of Antonio Tarizzo Borgialli, Controller of the Royal Finance Department, who had trained her husband at the start of his career. Tango was the youngest of three daughters. The oldest sister Eleonora married Cesare Tallone, a painter and professor at the Brera Academy of Fine Arts. The middle daughter, Antonietta, married Carlo Ambrogio Poggi, a lawyer and magistrate. The nature of her father's employment caused the family to move often in his early career, resulting in Tango's lack of formal education, although she was able to study briefly at a school run by French nuns in Rome. She studied literature, art, and music from her father's collections and those of the royal houses for which he worked. She was a talented artist, sculptor and pianist, and from a young age engaged in political discussions with visitors to the family home. After settling permanently in Rome in 1897, the family summered at her mother's estates in Alpignano.

Eleonora had a large family and Tango frequently visited them at their home, known as Maison Rustique (Rustic House), in Milan to help with the children's education. Tango also spent time in Rome and Alpignano with her parents, before settling full time in Milan in 1904 after they both had died. Maison Rustique was a retreat frequented by artists, writers, and poets, as well as socialists and women's rights activists. It was in their home that Tango met the painter Antonio Piatti. He had been a student of Tallone at the Brera Academy and graduated in 1902. On 6 March 1905, in Milan, Tango and Antonio married. The following month they moved to Paris to enable him to continue his studies. After one semester there, the couple returned to Rome, where their daughter Rosabianca was born in December. They remained in Rome until 1906, when the family moved back to Milan. Tango Piatti lost two infants shortly after their births in 1907 and 1908, and separated from Antonio after the death of her third child. Her later explanation of the separation was that they were incompatible, as she was a pacifist, and he was a fascist. The couple briefly reconciled in 1913, but separated permanently after the birth of her fourth child, Sanzio, who was called Rori, in 1914. They never officially divorced or legally separated, which would be helpful for her when the fascist regime came to power.

== Writing ==
Tango Piatti had begun writing poetry in 1905. She debuted with a poem in the magazine Casa e Famiglia (House and Family) in 1910. Moving to Alassio in 1911, she taught drawing and literature classes at the Istituto Internazionale Monti (Monti International Institute). When the journal Al Mare (At the Sea) was launched later that year, she began publishing a series of poems using the pen name Agar. (Note: Ada Donno, a former president of the Italian section of the WILPF, noted that the pseudonym was a reference to the biblical story of Hagar, who was banished by Abraham at the request of his wife Sarah.) She also published in L'Illustrazione Italiana (The Italian Illustration) and Varietas: Casa e Famiglia, successor to the earlier Casa e Famiglia in 1911 and 1912. Moving back to Milan in 1913, she became active in the Lyceum Club di Firenze (Lyceum Club of Florence). Lyceum clubs were organized throughout Europe as professional organizations for women, offering limited membership to women who had university qualifications or had published original art, music, writing, or scientific works. She was influenced in particular by Silvia Bemporad and Amelia Rosselli, who were members of the Lyceum Club and wrote literature for children and theatrical works. Tango Piatti began writing stories for children, published in the La Riviera Ligure (The Ligurian Riviera) between 1912 and 1914. She also wrote Autoritratto in abbozzo (Self-Portrait Sketch, 1912), which outlined her pacifist views. Between 1912 and 1918, she frequently published articles in the weekly Il Buon Consigliere (The Good Counselor) against militarism, arms buildup, and heroization of military leaders.

Within the family's circle of friends were many women's rights activists, like Gigina Sioli Legnani Conti, founder of the Lyceum Club of Milan; Rosa Genoni, an activist involved in improving educational and employment opportunities for women; sisters Gina and Paola Lombroso, both of whom wrote about social issues impacting women and children; and Vanna Piccini, a writer who wrote about the disparity of men's and women's societal roles. Tango Piatti's first book, Le reliquie di un ignoto (1915, The Relics of an Unknown Man) dealt with themes of social inequality. During World War I she worked as a nurse at the Red Cross Hospital of Florence and contributed serial pieces about her experiences to the journal Rassegna Nazionale (National Review), which were published as a book Diario di un'infermiera (Diary of a Nurse) in 1919. After she moved to Paris, in the late 1930s she primarily translated juvenile literature and edited pacifist journals. Historian and professor at the Università Cattolica del Sacro Cuore, Sabrina Fava, listed among Tango Piatti's significant works in juvenile fiction Rori e le sue bestie (Rori and His Beasts, 1926) and Quattro cani a spasso (Four Dogs out for a Walk, 1931) and in theatrical comedies Teatro minimo (Minimal Theater, 1924), Maschere ridenti (Laughing Masks, 1929), and Il Piccolo Tarin (Little Tarin, 1952). In 1938, she published La fabbrica della felicità (The Factory of Happiness), a semi-autobiographical novel.

== Activism ==
The onset of war ignited the anti-militarist and pacifist movements in Italy. From 1913, Tango Piatti was active in opposing the war, along with the Lombroso sisters, Sibilla Aleramo, Ada Negri, Amelia Pincherle Rosselli, and Margherita Sarfatti. Along with Genoni, Luisa Magnani, Vittorina Medugno, and Lina Schwarz, Tango Piatti was one of the five Italian delegates who registered to attend the 1921 Women's International League for Peace and Freedom Congress of Vienna. The organization had been founded in 1915, after the Women at the Hague congress was arranged as an unsponsored convention to allow women to voice their opposition to the war without compromising their feminist organizations. The sole Italian delegate to the organizational congress of WILPF was Genoni, who upon her return to Italy organized the Italian section of the WILPF with branches in Milan and Rome. She later recruited Tango Piatti, who was living in Florence. WILPF records show that from 1920, Tango Piatti's home became the meeting place for the Florence branch of the organization.

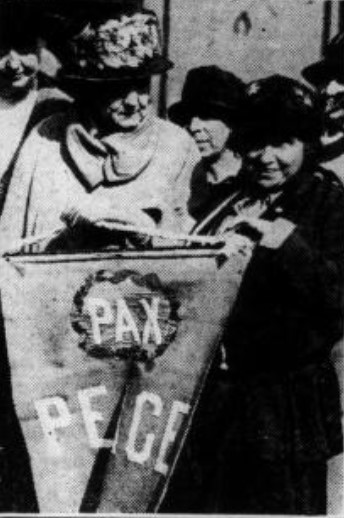
(l) Jane Addams and (r) Tango Piatti at the 1924 WILPF Congress

In 1922, Genoni recruited Tango Piatti to help organize the International Summer School in Varese. The summer schools were WILPF organized retreats that allowed the women to gather, attend lectures, and discuss various aspects of international cooperation. By spring, after the international headquarters had already printed the programs, the summer school had to be cancelled because of an increase in violence due to fascist actions and concern for the safety of the participants. Ida Vassalini was chosen as the Italian delegate to the 1924 WILPF Congress held in Washington, D.C., but because of illness was replaced by Tango Piatti, who spoke briefly at the conference about the Italian organization and pacifists in Italy. Although she was selected to attend the 1926 WILPF Congress in Dublin, Ireland, the congress report notes "delegate got as far as Switzerland; unable to get vis[a] further". Her written report on the Italian section was published, which explained that collective action had been difficult because of repression by the fascist regime, its nationalist aims, war, and control of the schools and professional organizations. She was also invited that year by Madeleine Doty to attend a workshop in Bourneville, France, but could not obtain travel documents.

Because of her outspokenness and published works, Tango Piatti had been logged in the central registry as subversive and an anti-fascist propagandist. Her passport was confiscated in 1927 and she was no longer able to obtain travel visas. She moved to Sanremo, where her sister Antonietta Poggi was living. Although Tango Piatti was listed as the Italian WILPF contact for the Prague Congress in 1929, no Italian delegates were allowed to attend. The situation fueled a plan for her and her son Rori to emigrate to France. She enrolled Rori in the high school in Nice in 1931, preventing him from being drafted. In 1932, Tango Piatti contacted the WILPF headquarters asking if she could represent the Italian section at the Grenoble congress, but received no answer. Maria Rossetti, who attended the Congress, made it clear in her presentation that the current Italian branch had no affiliation with the previous organization or members. With help from the Lombroso sisters, Tango Piatti was able to find an apartment in Paris in 1933. Using a subterfuge that she was to organize an exhibition of her husband's paintings in Paris, Tango Piatti was able to secure a visa. Her residence became the hub of support for the anti-fascist group Giustizia e Libertà (Justice and Freedom), and was used by fugitives like Carlo Rosselli to avoid detection.

== Later life, death, and legacy ==
Her sister Eleonora died in 1938, prompting Tango Piatti to schedule a brief return to Italy in May 1939. When trying to return to France in June, she was barred from leaving at Domodossola because of an altered date in her passport. She appealed to the consulate in Rome, but while awaiting a reply went to Alpignano, where Eleonora's children were living. Although she survived the Allied bombing of the area in February 1943, her whereabouts became known and she was arrested in May. She was incarcerated in Le Mantellate, a prison in Florence, and then in a civilian internment camp near Monte Generoso, in Lombardy, before being released at end of the year. From January 1944, she lived in Geneva, Switzerland, until the end of the war. Free to travel when the war ended, she visited her son and other family members in Milan, London, and Turin before settling in Lugano, Switzerland in 1954.

Tango Piatti died on 1 July 1958 in Lugano. In 2010, Gigliola Tallone published Virginia Tango Piatti 'Agar': una vita per la pace (Virginia Tango Piatti 'Agar': A Life for Peace) based on archival records belonging to the Tallone family. In 2015, the Italian sector of WILPF sponsored a seminar, Il Coraggio delle donne per la Pace (The Courage of Women for Peace), in Rome, to highlight the contributions of pacifist feminists in the interwar period in promoting internationalism and opposing fascism. Included in the presentation were histories of Tango Piatti, Genoni, and Vasalini.
