= Angeliki Palli =

Italian writer, translator, and early feminist

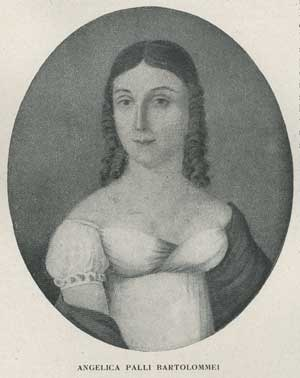
Portrait of Angeliki Palli

Angelica Palli (1798 – 1875) was an Italian writer of Greek ancestry, translator and early feminist. Her literary salon attracted intellectuals of the time.

== Biography ==
The daughter of a rich Greek merchant, she was born in Livorno, Tuscany and grew up in the Greek community there. She spoke Greek, French and Italian. Palli wrote tragedies, dramas, short stories, romantic novels and poems. In 1851, she published a feminist essay targeted at young mothers Discorso di una donna alle giovani maritote del suo paese. One of the themes in her work was the Greek struggle for independence from the Turks. She married the Italian politician Giampaolo Bartolomei.

She was born to Greek parents : Her father Panayiotis came from Ioannina in Epirus and not yet twenty had left his city to move to Livorno, a port city in great ferment, to undertake a commercial activity. Her mother Dorothea was a Lacedaemonian. Coming from a wealthy family, she studied with well-known tutors in the Leghorn environment such as De Coureil, and began improvising verses from adolescence.

Palli translated works of William Shakespeare, Victor Hugo and of French and Greek poets into Italian.

Her literary salon attracted intellectuals of the time including Ugo Foscolo, Lord Byron, Alessandro Manzoni, Andreas Kalvos, Alphonse de Lamartine, Giovanni Battista Niccolini, Giuseppe Mazzini and Firmin Didot.
