= Clementina Laura Majocchi =

Italian poet and writer

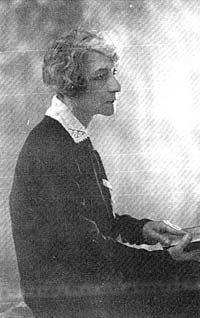
- Born: 1866; Cento, Italy
- Died: 1945 (aged 78–79); Italy
- Other name: Bruna Majocchi
- Occupations: Writer, journalist, poet
- Parents: Antonio Majocchi (1831-1907) (father); Lavinia Agnoletti (1839-1911) (mother)

Clementina Laura Majocchi, also known by her pseudonym Bruna (Cento, 1866 – Cento, 1945), was an Italian poet and writer.

== Biography ==
Bruna was born to the musician and politician Antonio Majocchi (1831-1907), one-time mayor of Cento, and his wife Lavinia Agnoletti (1839-1911) who was known for her rich literary, linguistic and musical skills. Bruna had two sisters, Maria (better known by her pseudonym Jolanda) and Gabriella. Bruna became an amateur violinist and played with her sisters. They were remembered at the time by the tenor Giuseppe Borgatti, who spoke of listening ecstatically when he stopped under the window of the sisters' house as he listened to them play.

Bruna devoted herself to poetry accompanied initially by the sad emotions of her boyfriend's death. Her poems Barcarola and Acque chete were published by the magazine La Riviera Ligure, and then incorporated into the anthology L'eterna chimera (Casa Editrice Fiorita, 1913, p. 38 and 40). She made friends with the famous poet Alberto Cappelletti, with whom she had similar tastes. On 18 March 1908 her work L'intima fiamma (The intimate flame) was reviewed in the magazine La Sicilia which cited the rebellion of her verses against the distortions and cowardice of the world.

In 1912, she won the competition of the International Women 's Association for Art with the poem Pane e Psiche (Bread and Psyche), which was considered a dramatic scene suitable to be accompanied by music. She also wrote about childhood with an emphasis on educational and literary development, and translated into Italian such works as Polish Novels by Leon Choromanski (Sonzogno, 1920 and 1927).

From 1919 to 1921 Bruna directed a supplement to the Cordelia magazine aimed at renewing the female image. She later directed (unsuccessfully) another magazine Vittoria Colonna.

She died in Cento in 1945.

== Selected works ==
=== Collections of poems ===
- Pètali e lagrime (Petals and Tears), Licinio Cappelli Editore, 1894.
- In solitudine (In solitude), Licinio Cappelli Editore, 1898, ISBN 978-148-0022-89-8
- Canti di capinera (Blackcap songs), Rocca di San Casciano, Licinio Cappelli Editore, 1901.
- L'ermo sentiero (L'ermo trail), Licinio Cappelli Editore, 1906.
- L'intima fiamma (The intimate flame), Licinio Cappelli Editore, 1909.
- Ansia di Luce (Anxiety of Light), Bologna, L. Cappelli Editore, 1921.
- Ricolta di spighe e di corolle (Harvest of ears and corollas), Bologna, Licinio Cappelli Editore, 1921.

=== Novel ===
- L'acqua che non disseta (Water that does not quench thirst), Milan, publisher A. Solmi, 1928.
