= Elisa S. Amore =

Italian novelist (born 1984)

- Born: Elisa Strazzanti; April 13, 1984 (age 42)
- Occupations: Author, novelist
- Writing career
- Genres: Young adult fiction, fantasy, romance, paranormal
- Notable work: Touched Saga

Elisa S. Amore (born April 13, 1984) is an Italian novelist. She is the author of the "Touched" series, a supernatural romance saga about Heaven and Hell. Her series is an international success originally published in Italian by the major Italian publisher Editrice Nord.

== Career ==
In 2016, she began to have her books translated and published in English. Touched saga was her primary creation which sold over 200,000 copies.

Its first volume, Touched: The Caress of Fate, which is the story of an Angel of Death, has been hailed by critics as “a young adult version of Meet Joe Black and City of Angels.” In 2017, Amore flew to Los Angeles to work on the audio version of Touched with Hollywood star Matt Lanter.

She was a guest of honor at the 2013 Lucca Comics & Games, and has been featured in Vanity Fair, Glamour, MarieClaire Italy and Wired. FantasyMagazine called her ‘the undisputed queen of romantic fantasy.'

She published Dark Tournament in mid 2018, the first book of a new spin-off trilogy set in the same world as the Touched saga.

== Publications ==
=== Touched Series ===
- Touched: The Caress of Fate (2016)
- Unfaithful: The Deception of Night (2016)
- Brokenhearted: The Power of Darkness (2016)
- Expiation: The Whisper of Death (2017)

=== Short Novels ===
- The Shadow of Fate (2016)
- The Mark of Fate (2017)

=== Dark Tournament Series ===
- Dark Tournament (2018)
- Rogue Arena (2018)

== Personal life ==
She lives in Italy with her husband and son.
