= Lisa Morpurgo =

Italian writer

Morpurgo, Lisa
- Born: Lisa Dordoni; 19 May 1923; Soncino, Italy
- Died: 8 March 1998 (aged 74); Milan, Italy
- Education: Università Statale di Milano
- Occupation: Writer
- Writing career
- Subject: Astrology

Lisa Morpurgo Dordoni (19 May 1923 in Soncino (CR) – 9 May 1998 in Milan) was a writer and astrologer.

== Biography ==
Lisa Morpurgo gained a degree in literature at the Università Statale di Milano, presenting a thesis on Maurice Barrès (thesis). She started to be interested in astrology while working as a translator for book publishers.

Morpurgo was first intrigued by astrology while translating the French book "Lo Zodiaco – Segreti e sortilegi" by François-Régis Bastide. The translation of this book about zodiacal signs peculiarities awakened her curiosity for astrology, a matter up to that moment so distant from her cultural background. She sketched the zodiacal map of some of her friends – mostly writers, such as Eugenio Montale, Dino Buzzati, Guido Piovene, Gabriel García Márquez, Mario Vargas Llosa – a work that considerably improved her knowledge and urged her to unveil the reasons why zodiacal mechanisms seemed to effectively work.

From this starting point, Morpurgo searched for those astrological mechanisms that lay under each phenomenon. Her lessons and books opened new roads to research.

In 1968, Morpurgo published her first novel, Madame andata e ritorno. In 1972, she published her first astrological book Introduzione all'astrologia e decifrazione dello Zodiaco which reached tens of further editions, in several countries. In 1975, she published Macbarath, a science-fiction novel which anticipated her future astrological discoveries. In 1979, she published what was defined as her most important astrological book Il convitato di pietra. In 1988, she published her fourth novel: La noia di Priapo. Between 1983 and 1992, she published Lezioni di Astrologia in order to further her astrological theories: La natura dei segni, La natura dei pianeti, La natura delle case, La natura dei transiti. Among other books, she wrote L'astrologia e l'amore and Bimbo astrologo.

In her theories, Morpurgo applied a logical and rational approach to astrology. She revisited astrological theories, reconfiguring the system of domiciles and exaltations of the planets. This approach gave more value to astrological theories, which suggested the existence of two more planets. Morpurgo defined them as X-Demetra and Y-Eolo. X would signify the great female principal, in complementary opposition to the meaning of Pluto. Y would signify the great ruler of long and slow time and low frequencies – lord of meteorological and geological phenomena, in complementary opposition to the meaning of Neptune.

Morpurgo organised and directed 12 congresses of astrological studies. The first one in Laveno in 1976, others in Ferrara, Varese, Mantova, Verona, Riccione, and the last one in 1993.

Before her death, Morpurgo decided to entrust the study material accumulated over time to her pupils and collaborators Gabriele Silvagni and Raffaella Vaccari. Silvagni and Vaccari published the study material, making this documentation free and universally available with its whole considerable historical and scientific importance.

In 2026, a short film entitled Lisa Morpurgo and the geometries of the code (originally Le Geometrie del codice) was produced by Gabriele Silvagni and directed by Massimo Salvucci, achieving selection at some international film festivals. It is described as a journey through the figure of the great Author who deciphered mathematic cosmogony of reality, thanks to her understanding of the scientific nature inherent in the Zodiac. With testimonies and memories of a brilliant figure who will be considered fundamental by future science. (Independent Short Awards). In February 2026, the short was awarded as Best Editing at the Los Angeles Independent Short Awards (Honorable Mentions).

The main characteristic of Morpurgo's work was the attempt to link empirical observation to zodiacal symbology with the objective of denying or confirming astrological traditional beliefs and suppositions by means of rational observation of phenomena.

In a few words, we can say that Morpurgo achieved the complete zodiac deciphering on the basis of strict logical and geometrical principles, identifying all its components. But she was particularly brilliant at deciphering what was hidden inside that heavenly mechanism: the interpretation code of cosmic reality that, through two different zodiacal systems A and B (each with its two specific Zodiacs), completes the map of the real Cosmogony.

== Dignities according to Lisa Morpurgo ==
Planet	Primary domicile	Basic domicile	Primary detriment	Basic detriment	Exaltation	Fall	Transparence
Sun	Leo		Aquarius		Aries	Libra	Scorpio
Moon	Cancer		Capricorn		Pisces	Virgo	Sagittarius
Mercury	Gemini	Virgo	Sagittarius	Pisces	Scorpio	Taurus	Cancer
Venus	Libra	Taurus	Aries	Scorpio	Cancer	Capricorn	Pisces
Mars	Aries	Scorpio	Libra	Taurus	Capricorn	Cancer	Virgo
Jupiter	Sagittarius	Pisces	Gemini	Virgo	Taurus	Scorpio	Capricorn
Saturn	Capricorn	Aquarius	Cancer	Leo	Libra	Aries	Taurus
Uranus	Aquarius	Capricorn	Leo	Cancer	Virgo	Pisces	Gemini
Neptune	Pisces	Sagittarius	Virgo	Gemini	Aquarius	Leo	Libra
Pluto	Scorpio	Aries	Taurus	Libra	Gemini	Sagittarius	Aquarius
X (Proserpine)?	Taurus	Libra	Scorpio	Aries	Sagittarius	Gemini	Leo
Y (Aeolus)?	Virgo	Gemini	Pisces	Sagittarius	Leo	Aquarius	Aries
