= Angelo de Gubernatis =

Italian art critic and writer (1840–1913)

Count Angelo de Gubernatis
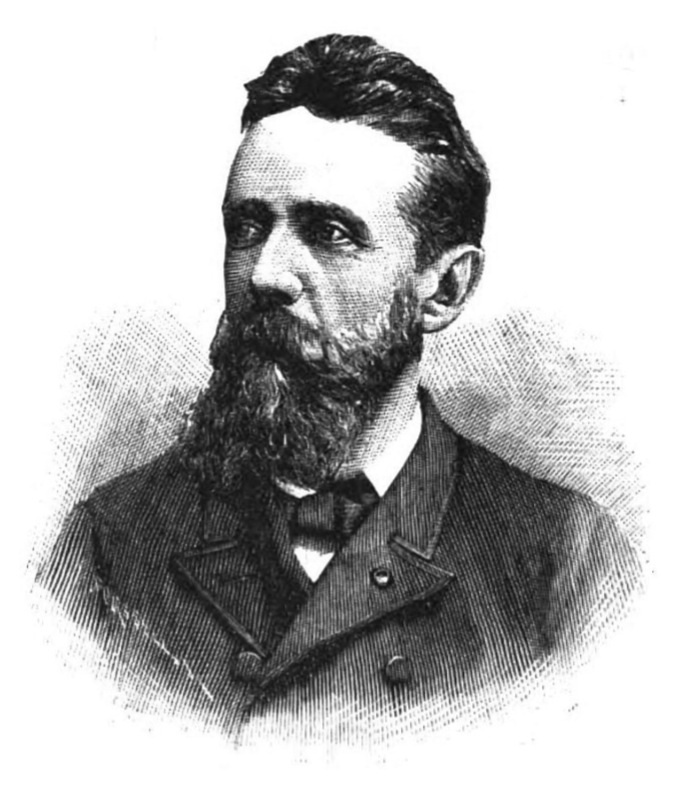
- Born: 7 April 1840; Turin, Italy
- Died: 26 February 1913 (aged 72–73); Rome, Kingdom of Italy
- Occupations: Philologist; poet
- Awards: Nobel Prize nominee

Count Angelo De Gubernatis (7 April 1840 – 26 February 1913) was an Italian man of letters. He was born in Turin and educated there and in Berlin, where he studied philology. He was nominated for the Nobel Prize in Literature fourteen times.

== Life ==
In 1862, he was appointed professor of Sanskrit at Florence, but having married a cousin of the Socialist Bakunin and become interested in his views he resigned his appointment and spent some years in travel. He was reappointed, however, in 1867; and in 1891 he was transferred to the Sapienza University of Rome. He became prominent both as an orientalist, a publicist and a poet.

He founded the Italia letteraria (1862), the Rivista orientale (1867), the Civiltà italiana and Rivista europea (1869), the Bollettino italiano degli studii orientali (1876) and the Revue internationale (1883), and in 1887 became director of the Giornale della società asiatica. In 1878 he started the Dizionario biografico degli scrittori contemporanei. He also published a similar anthology for the visual arts and architecture.

His Oriental and mythological works include the Piccola enciclopedia indiana (1867), the Fonti vediche (1868), a famous work on zoological mythology (1872), and another on plant mythology (1878). Between 1881 and 1884 he conceived and directed a magazine for young women titled Cordelia, and in the first issue, he invited readers to send in something to be published. One very early contributor, who later became the magazine's director, was Maria Majocchi who, at that time, preferred the pseudonym Margheritina di Cento and later became widely known as Jolanda.

De Gubernatis also edited the encyclopaedic Storia universale della letteratura (1882–1885). His work in verse includes the dramas Gala, Romolo, Il re Nala, Don Rodrigo, Savitri, etc. He was elected as a member to the American Philosophical Society in 1886.

In later years he published a series of lectures on Italian poetry (1907), and a Dictionnaire internationale des écrivains du monde latin (1905–1906). He died in Rome, on 26 February 1913.
