= Gabriella Sica =

Italian poet

Gabriella Sica (born 24 October 1950) is an Italian poet.

Born in Viterbo, she went to Rome in 1960 and after having published her poems in several publication, she published her first book of poems La famosa vita in 1986. Since 1980 she has been working in modern poetry and since 1987 she's the director of "Prato pagano" publications, a magazine where new poets can publish their works. She took part of the poetry anthology La parola ritrovata, ultime tendenze della poesia italiana, which deals with the orientation to poets in the last two decades of 20th century. She also has participated in the book, Scrivere in versi, metrica e poesia and in videos about poets like Giuseppe Ungaretti, Eugenio Montale, Pier Paolo Pasolini, Umberto Saba, Sandro Penna and Giorgio Caproni.

== Works ==
- La famosa vita (1986, Premio Brutium-Poesia)
- Scuola di ballo (1988, Premio Lerici* Scrivere in versi (1996, revised edition 2003,2011-Golfo dei poeti)
- È nato un bimbo (1990)
- Vicolo del Bologna (1992, finalist Premio San Pellegrino)
- La parola ritrovata - Ultime tendenze della poesia italiana (editor, with Maria Ida Gaeta, 1995)
- Poesie bambine (1997)
- Poesie familiari (2001, Premio Internazionale Camaiore, finalist Premio Metauro and Premio Frascati)
- Sia dato credito all'invisibile. Prose e saggi (2000)
- Scrivere in versi (1996, revised edition 2003,2011)
- Le lacrime delle cose (2009, Premio Garessio-Ricci, Premio Poesia Alghero Donna, Finalist Premio Arenzano-Lucia Rodecanachi, Premio Giuseppe Dessì)
- Emily e le Altre. Con 56 poesie di Emily Dickinson(2010)
