= Virginia Mariani Campolieti =

Italian pianist, orchestra conductor and composer

Virginia Mariani Campolieti (born 4 December 1869, d. 1941) was an Italian pianist, orchestra conductor and composer. She was born in Genoa, Italy, and studied piano at the Liceo Musicale Rossini in Pesaro with Mario Vitale and Luigi Torchi, graduating in 1892. She conducted some of her opera performances. She composed Dal sogno alla vita, opera.

== Works ==
Campolieti composed vocal music and one opera. Selected works include:

- 33 Canzoncine per Bambini, Vol. 3
- Apotheosis di Rossini, cantata for solo soprano, chorus, organ and orchestra
