= Maria Luisa Cicci =

18th-century Italian poet and salon sponsor

- Born: 14 September 1760; Pisa
- Died: 8 March 1794 (aged 33); Pisa

Maria Luisa Cicci (14 September 1760 - 8 March 1794) was an Italian woman of letters and 18th century poet, a member of a member of the literary-scholarly societies (academies) of Arcadians of Pisa and Intronati of Siena; she was a prominent sponsor of literary salons in Pisa.

== Biography ==
Cicci was born in Pisa in 1760. The family was originally from Fucecchio but with proof of having Pisan origins prior to the year 1319 they were considered local nobility. Her father was Domenico Alessandro Cicci, a doctor in law and in letters. Her mother, Maria Anna was the daughter of the Captain Giovanni Gaetano Pagnini, Commander of the Cavalleggieri di Rosignano. She died when Maria Luisa was two years old. Her father supervised her education until she was eight. Then he sent her to finish her education in the Monastery of Santa Marta and then to the Monastery of San Bernardo until she was fifteen. At that point she returned home where she began studying the poets and especially Homer, Dante, Petrarch, Saverio Bettinelli, Fulvio Testi and in particular Gabriello Chiabrera and Carlo Innocenzo Frugoni. She then began to study philosophy physics including Locke and Newton and English literature including Milton, Shakespeare. Cicci then began to study history, English and French. She began writing poetry when she was ten and devoted most of her life to poetry.

Cicci was admitted to the Academy of Arcadia in Pisa in 1786 where she took the name of Emenia Tindarida. She also was admitted to Accademia degli Intronati of Siena that year where she took the name The Incognita. She lived in her brother's home and hosted the salon's there.

The local circle included Tito Manzi, Giovanni Domenico Anguillesi, Elena Mastiani Brunacci, Francesco Masi, Giovanni Salvatore de Coureil, Luigi Migliaresi, Giovanni Salvadore De Coureil and Ridolfo Castinelli. Cicci's writings made her famous. She remained independent and refused any marriage proposal. However shortly after the deaths of two of her close friends she began to feel ill and died at the age of 34 in 1794 in Pisa.

Unfortunately there is almost nothing left of her writings. She had most of them set on fire just before she died. However her brother and her friends were able to recite some and had them published after her death.

== Works ==
- Cicci, Maria Luisa. "Poesie di Maria Luisa Cicci tra gli Arcadi Erminia Tindaride : Maria Luisa Cicci".
