= Luisa Zeni =

Italian secret agent and author (1896-1940)

Luisa Zeni (Arco, 1896 - 1940) was an Italian secret agent and writer.

== Biography ==
=== Early years ===
She was born in Arco, Trentino, in 1896. The daughter of a blacksmith, she lost her mother when a small child.

She lived in the early years of the twentieth century, in the climate of growing tension within the Austro-Hungarian Empire between Italians and Germans. An irredentist, she came from a region hesitant between a centuries-old loyalty to the Habsburgs and the call for Italian independence. After crossing the border in 1914, she played an important role in the pro-war propaganda within the Committee of the Adriatic and Trento Irredents (Comitato degli Irredenti Adriatici e Trentini). She also wrote of her experiences.

=== The Great War ===
In the lead-up to the war, the Command of the First Army recruited Trentino inhabitants willing to participate in an espionage operation aimed at disclosing enemies' movements from Ala up to the Brenner Pass. Zeni was recruited in 1915 by Colonel Tullio Marchetti, Chief of the Information Office. On May 22, 1915, Zeni crossed the border, entering Austrian territory in the Ossenigo area.

Due to her knowledge of the German language and of the Trentino, in the weeks following her arrival Zeni gathered information, which she noted down in minuscule papers that she later hid in the buttons of her coat. Her cautiousness saved her life at the end of July: she was arrested, but the accusations against her were dropped. She avoided the destiny of other Italian spies, who were found out and executed during the same period.

== Selected works ==
The Medal of Military Valor, awarded1915

Zeni's works include the following:

- Briciole: ricordi di una donna in guerra (1926)
- Irredento (1928)
- Figli d'Italia (1932)
