= Cornelia Barbaro Gritti =

Venetian poet and salon-holder

Cornelia Barbaro Gritti (1719 – 19 April 1808) was a Venetian poet and salon-holder.

She was the daughter of Bernardo Barbaro and Elisabetta Lucchini and married in 1736 to Giovannantonio Gritti.
