= Melissa Panarello =

Italian writer

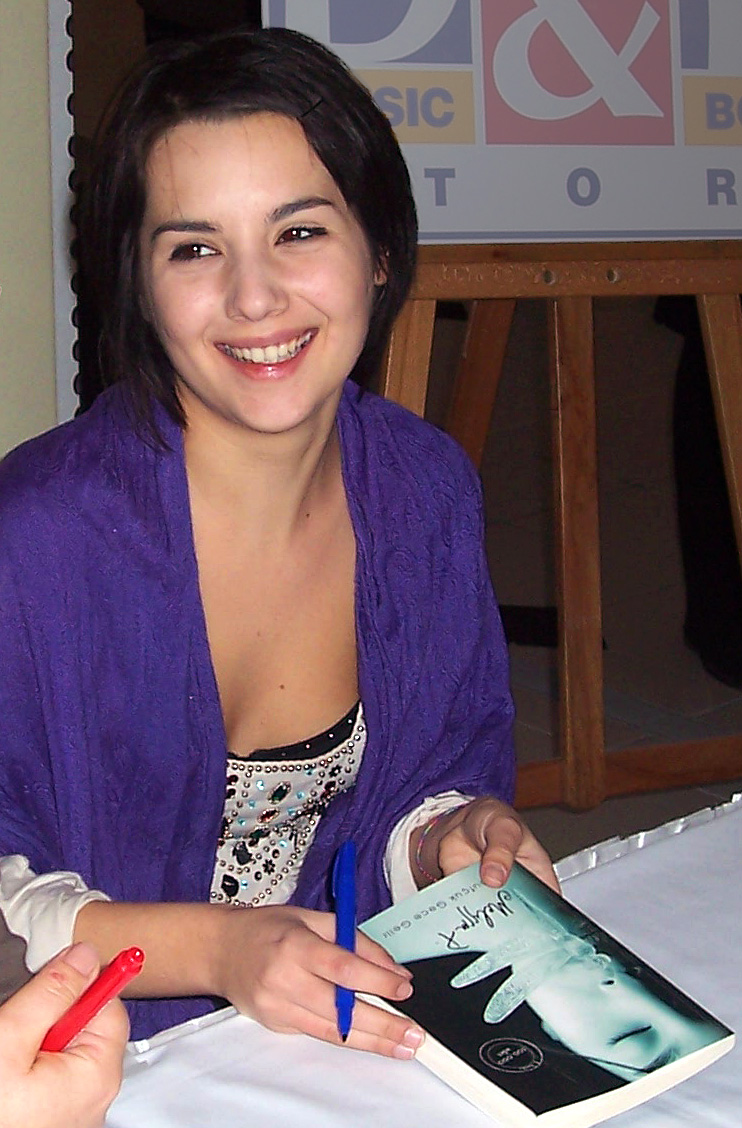
- Melissa Panarello in 2006
- Born: 3 December 1985 (age 40); Catania, Italy
- Citizenship: Italy
- Occupations: Writer, author
- Children: 2
- Writing career
- Pen name: Melissa P
- Language: Italian
- Genre: Erotic literature

Melissa Panarello (born 3 December 1985, in Catania, Italy), alias Melissa P., is an Italian writer.

== Biography ==
Panarello grew up in the small Sicilian town of Aci Castello, near Catania in Italy. In 2003, she became famous for authoring the erotic novel, 100 colpi di spazzola prima di andare a dormire (translated into English by Lawrence Venuti as One Hundred Strokes of the Brush Before Bed, 2004). The novel, written in diary form, focuses on the narrator's extreme sexual life during her teenage years and is loosely based on the author's own experiences.

In December 2022, she got married and has 2 children.

== Books ==
- Melissa P. (2004). 100 Strokes of the Brush Before Bed. Translated by Venuti, Lawrence. HarperCollins. ISBN 0060789611.
- Panarello, Melissa (2006). The Scent of Your Breath. Translated by Whiteside, Shaun. Grove/Atlantic. ISBN 9780802170224.
