= Melania Mazzucco =

Italian author

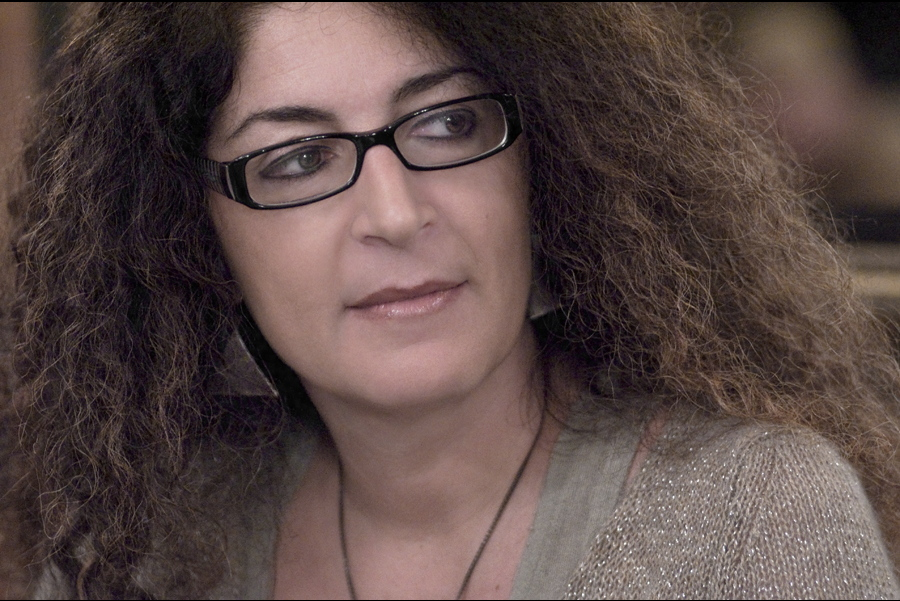
Melania Gaia Mazzucco

Melania Gaia Mazzucco (born 6 October 1966) is an Italian author. She is a recipient of the Strega Prize and Bagutta Prize.

== Education and career ==
Mazzucco graduated from the Centro Sperimentale di Cinematografia in 1990 and the Sapienza University of Rome with a degree in History of Modern and Contemporary Literature in 1992. In the 1990s, she wrote several screenplays before publishing her first novel Il bacio della Medusa in 1996.

Her 2003 novel Vita was awarded the Strega Prize. The novel tells the story of two children from a rural Italian village, Diamante aged twelve and Vita aged nine, who emigrate to New York. It was translated into English by Virginia Jewiss.

A film adaptation of Mazzucco's 2005 novel Un giorno perfetto was released in 2008. It was directed by Ferzan Özpetek and was entered in the 65th Venice International Film Festival.

In 2008, Mazzucco published the first of two volumes on the Renaissance painter Tintoretto called La lunga attesa dell’angelo which won a Bagutta Prize. The second volume, Jacomo Tintoretto e i suoi figli: storia di una famiglia veneziana, was published in 2009.

== Bibliography ==
- Il bacio della Medusa (1996) ISBN 8880890921
- La camera di Baltus (1998) ISBN 8880893351
- Lei così amata (2000) ISBN 8817863114
- Vita (2003) ISBN 8817871621
- Un giorno perfetto (2005) ISBN 8817007277
- La lunga attesa dell’angelo (2008) ISBN 8817025852
- Jacomo Tintoretto e i suoi figli: storia di una famiglia veneziana (2009) ISBN 8817030384
- Limbo (2012) ISBN 8806209388
- Il bassotto e la Regina (2012) ISBN 8806214462
- Sei come sei (2013) ISBN 8806209469
- Io sono con te: Storia di Brigitte (2016) ISBN 8806232533
