= Simonetta Greggio =

Italian novelist (born 1961)

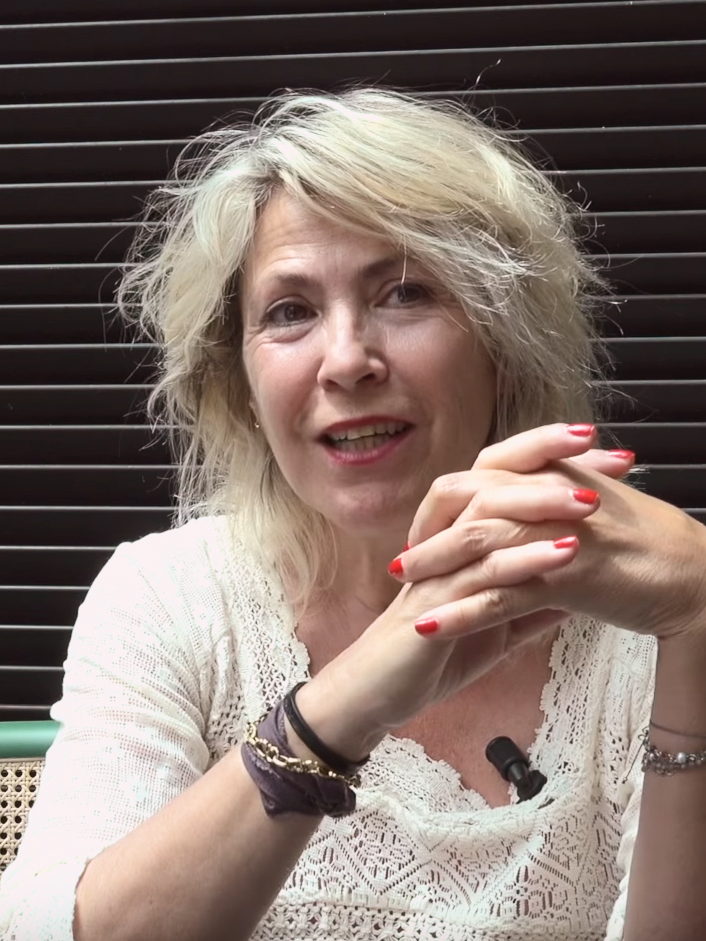
- Greggio in 2018
- Born: 21 April 1961 (age 65); Padua, Italy
- Occupation: novelist
- Writing career
- Genre: Fiction
- Literary movement: Postmodern
- Website: www.editions-stock.fr/auteurs/simonetta-greggio

Simonetta Greggio is an Italian novelist who writes in French.

== Biography ==
Born on 21 April 1961 in Padua, Italy, Simonetta Greggio moved to Paris, France, in 1981 and has been living there since. Before turning to literature, she contributed as a journalist to several magazines such as City, Télérama, D la Repubblica and Figaro Madame.

== Career ==
Simonetta Greggio is the author of a dozen books and guides on "art de vivre".

Her first novel, La douceur des hommes, published by Stock in 2005, was voted one of the twenty best books of the year by French magazine Lire.

Her short novela, Etoiles, published by Flammarion in 2006, is translated into six languages including Russian and Korean.

Her second novel, Col de l’Ange, published by Stock in 2007 awaits to be translated.

== Bibliography ==
Novels:

- 2005 : La douceur des hommes, Stock Publishers; 2007, Le Livre de Poche
- 2006 : Étoiles, Flammarion Publishers; 2008, Le Livre de Poche
- 2007 : Col de l'Ange, Stock Publishers
- 2008 : Les mains nues, Stock Publishers
- 2010 : Dolce Vita, Stock Publishers
- 2011 : L'Odeur du figuier, Flammarion

Other Books:

- 2001 : La Côte d'Azur des jardins
- 2005 : Cuisine bio, avec Bonneterre
- 2006 : Saveurs d'Italie – 40 recettes et astuces
