= Gennady Kiselev =

Russian translator and linguist

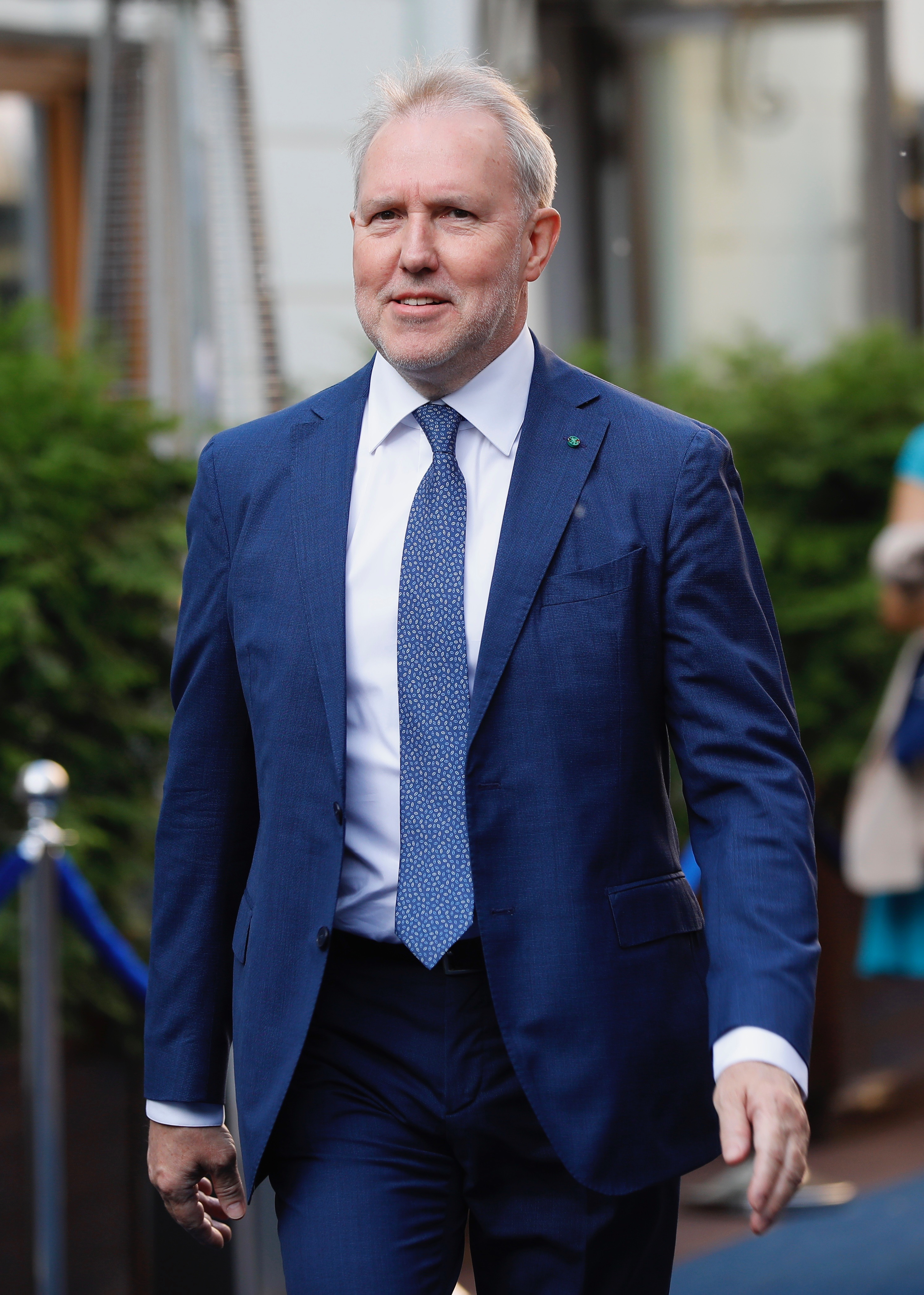
- Occupations: Translator, linguist, philologist
- Writing career
- Notable awards: Cavalier of the Order of Merit of the Italian Republic

Gennady Kiselev (Russian: Геннадий Петрович Киселёв; born 13 February 1955 in Moscow) is a Russian translator, philologist, and linguist.

== Biography ==
Kiselev graduated from the Moscow Maurice Thorez University of Foreign Languages in 1980. As a translator and literary critic he publishes his works in Russian and Italian since 1984.

Among his numerous edited and translated publications are the translations in Russian of such important Italian authors as Alessandro Piccolomini, Carlo Goldoni, Carlo Gozzi, Alberto Savinio, Filippo Tommaso Marinetti, Massimo Bontempelli, Antonio Gramsci, Dino Buzzati, Umberto Eco, Luigi Malerba, Mario Luzi, Margherita Guidacci, Alberto Moravia, Tommaso Landolfi, Italo Calvino, G. Tomasi di Lampedusa, Tonino Guerra, Enrico Morovich, Nino De Vita, Giovanni Testori, Alessandro Baricco, Aldo Nove, Tiziano Scarpa, Emanuele Trevi, Franco Arminio and others.

He is a member of the jury for several literary awards in Russia and in Italy, a member of the Union of Russian Writers (1994), the Moscow Writers' Union, and the "Masters of Literary Translation" Association.

== Translations ==
He translated and published in Russian An Autumn Story by Tommaso Landolfi, Whole Life and "Maupassant and the Other" by Alberto Savinio, If on a winter's night a traveler by Italo Calvino, Me and Him by Alberto Moravia, Oceano mare and Silk by Alessandro Baricco, Something Written by Emanuele Trevi, Fundamental Things and Venice is a Fish by Tiziano Scarpa, Amor costante by Alessandro Piccolomini, The Merchant of Smyrna and The Man of the World by Carlo Goldoni, The ill-set dinner by Carlo Gozzi, Superwoobinda by Aldo Nove, Postcards from the Dead by Franco Arminio, as well as essays, short stories and poems by Dino Buzzati, Giovanni Tomasi di Lampedusa, Enrico Morovich, Tonino Guerra, Nino De Vita, Giovanni Testori, Umberto Eco, Luigi Malerba, Mario Luzi, and others.

He is editor of the collections The train has whistled. Italian short stories of the Twentieth century (Moscow: Raduga 1988); The great portrait and other stories by Dino Buzzati (Moscow: Raduga 1999); Almost by love. Twelve Italian Short Stories (Moscow: Raduga 2000); The Sea Color of Wine. Italian short stories of the Twentieth century (Moscow: Raduga, 2004). He is author of the preface and editor of the collection The enchanted island. New short stories about Italy, published in Russia (Moscow: Corpus, 2014) and in Italy (Transeuropa, 2016).

Kiselev has authored several Italian language textbooks (Learn Italian without a teacher and others) and Italian language dictionaries.

He is author of several articles and essays in Italian, including the essay "On the Translation of the Parable" (Quaderni di libri e riviste d'Italia, 33. La traduzione: saggi e documenti III, Ministero per i beni culturali e аmbientali, Rome, 1997); a talk and essay devoted to Tommaso Landolfi, "Landolfi in Russia: adventures and metamorphosis" (published in the collection Gli 'altrove' di Tommaso Landolfi, Rome: Bulzoni editore, 2004); a talk and essay published by the University of Warsaw "Italy outside Italy: literature of the 20th century, as seen from Russia" (Italy and East-Central Europe - the last hundred years, Warszawa: Semper, 2009); he has also authored critical essays devoted to the work of G. Fusco, I. Calvino, E. Montale, F. Biamonti, N. Orengo, G. Lagorio, G. Arpino, I. Brin, published in I Quaderni della Biblioteca sul mare, Alassio 100 libri - Un autore per l'Europa award, 2007-2012.

== Awards and honours ==
- Grinzane Cavour - Cecilia Kin award (1997).
- Independent Journalists's award "Zoil" (2002).
- National Translation Award of the Italian Ministry of Cultural Heritage and Activities (2004).
- Gorky Prize (2010).
- ILuminator Award (2016).
- Cavalier of the Order of Merit of the Italian Republic (2000)

== List of publications and translations ==
- G. Kiselev "On the translation of the parable", Tetradi perevodchika, n. 21; Moscow: Vyshaya shkola, 1984.
- D. Buzzati "The big cleanup", short story translation. Tetradi perevodchika, n. 21; Moscow: Vyshaya shkola, 1984.
- G. Kiselev "Sulla traduzione della parabola", essay in Italian. Quaderni di libri e riviste d’Italia, 33. La traduzione: saggi e documenti (III). Rome: Italian Ministry of the Cultural and environmental Heritage, 1997.
- A. Gramsci "Socialism and culture" (translation). Calling things by their names, anthology (editor, commentary); Moscow: Progress, 1986.
- M. Bontempelli "Four preambles" (translation). Calling things by their names, anthology (editor, commentary); Moscow: Progress, 1986.
- T. Landolfi "Melotechnics exposed to the people", short story (introduction, translation). Moscow: Muzykalnaya zhizn', 1986.
- G. Kiselev. Handbook of Italian Language Part I, II. Moscow: Ministry of Education of the RSFSR,1986;
- G. Kiselev. Learn Italian without a teacher. Chero, Moscow, 2002;
- G. Kiselev. Italian language: a complete course. AST Lingva, Moscow, 2017.
- G. Kiselev. Italian language. The latest self-learning handbook with audio course, Moscow: AST, 2021.
- M. Guidacci. "On the translation of poetry" (translation), Translation as a means of mutual understanding between nations; Progress, Moscow, 1987.
- R. Mussapi "In the name of light" (translation). In Translation as a means of mutual understanding between nations; Progress, Moscow, 1987.
- М. Luzi "Circumstances of translation: theater" (translation), Translation as a means of mutual understanding between nations; Progress, Moscow, 1987.
- А. Savinio "Music an estranged thing," essay "Old Piano.", short story (preface, translation). Muzykal'naya zhizn', n. 9. Moscow, 1987.
- G. Kiselev "An unknown letter by Rossini: To the famous singer Clara Novello, sincerely devoted Gioacchino Rossini" (article, translation). Muzykal'naya zhizn', n. 18. Moscow, 1987.
- T. Landolfi, Sunstroke, Collection of short stories (translation, editing). Journal of the Library Inostrannaya literatura, Izvestiya, Moscow, 1987.
- G. Kiselev "The train whistled. Italian short stories of the 20th Century. Anthology." In Italian. (ed., notes on authors, commentary), Raduga, Мosca, 1988.
- А. Savinio "The house concert," story (translation). Muzykal'naya zhizn', n. 24, Moscow, 1988.
- G. Kiselev Supplementary reading manual in Italian language. Ministry of Education of the RSFSR, Moscow, 1988.
- Т. Landolfi "The sword," short story (translation). In Sovremennaja fantastika, collection of essays, Knizhnaya palata, Moscow, 1988.
- I. Calvino "Who do we write for? (The hypothetical shelf)", essay (translation). In Homo Legens, collection of essays, Progress, Moscow, 1989.
- L. Malerba "The Ghost of the Non-Reader," essay (translation). In Homo Legens, collection of essays, Progress, Moscow, 1989.
- U. Eco "Consumption, research and the reader-model," essay (translation). In Homo Legens, collection of essays, Progress, Moscow, 1989.
- G. Kiselev, G. Salità, O. Janovskiy. Dictionary of active vocabulary of the Italian language. Ministry of Education of the RSFSR, Moscow, 1989.
- D. Buzzati "The Dove," short story (translation). Selected stories. Raduga, Moscow, 1989.
- А. Savinio. Whole life, Collection of essays and short stories (ed, preface, translation). Journal of the Library Inostrannaya literatura, Izvestiya, Moscow, 1990.
- Т. Landolfi "Gogol's wife", short story (translation). Literaturnye novosti, n. 36-37. Мosca, 1993; "29", n 1. Moscow, 1998.
- Т. Landolfi "The Sea of Cockroaches", short story (translation). Ogonyok n. 29. Moscow, 1993.
- D. Buzzati, Stories by Dino Buzzati (translation). Ogonyok, n.8, Moscow, 1994. Inostrannaya literatura n.12. Мosca, 1994; "29", n. 5. Moscow, 1997.
- I. Calvino If on a winter's night a traveler (translation). Inostrannaya literatura, n. 4. Мosca, 1994. Winner of the Grinzane Cavour - Cecilia Kin award 1997. Collected works vol.3, (ed.); Simposium, Saint Petersburg, 2000; Series "Illuminator", n.13. Journal of the Library Inostrannaya literatura, Izvestiya, Мosca, 2000; AST, Moscow, 2010, 2019.
- А. Moravia. Me and Him, novel (translation). Respublika, Мosca, 1994; Eksmo, Moscow, 2000-2001; Collected works vol.3, Terra, Moscow, 2001; Prodolzhenie zhizni, Saint Petersburg, 2003; AST, Moscow, 2010.
- G. Tomasi di Lampedusa "Lighea" / "The Mermaid," short story. (translation). Inostrannaya literatura, n. 7. Moscow, 1997; Azbuka-Attikus Saint Petersburg, 2017.
- C. Jean, P. Savona et al. Geoeconomia, collection of articles (translation, with I. Smagin). Ad Marginem, Moscow, 1997.
- A. Baricco. Oceano mare, (preface, translation). Inostrannaya literatura, n 1. Moscow, 1998; Series "Illuminator", n.24. Journal of the Library Inostrannaya literatura, Moscow 2001-2006; Azbuka, Moscow, 2010-2014; Audiolibro interpretato da Ju. Vasiliev (7 CD), Sojuz, Moscow, 2014.
- Т. Landolfi An Autumn Story, novel (translation). In Gogol's wife and other stories, (ed.); Agraf, Moscow, 1999., 1999; B.S.G. Press (afterword) Moscow, 2005, Winner of the Gorky award 2010.
- Т. Landolfi. "Kafka's dad" short story (translation). In Gogol's wife and other stories, (ed.); Agraf, Moscow, 1999.
- A. Baricco. Silk (translation). Inostrannaya literatura, n. 6. Moscow, 1999; Series "Illuminator", n.23. Journal of the Library Inostrannaya literatura, Moscow, 2001-2006; Azbuka, 2006; Audiobook performed by S. Shakurov, (2 CD, introduction), Soyuz, Moscow, 2010.
- G. Kiselev (ed., notes on authors, commentary, translation) D. Buzzati "The great portrait and other stories". Anthology in Italian. Raduga, Moscow, 1999-2000.
- А. Savinio "Maupassant and the other", essay-story (preface, translation). Inostrannaya literatura, n 10. Moscow, 1999.
- А. Piccolomini L'amor costante, comedy (translation). In The Italian comedy of the Renaissance; Kudozhestvennaya literatura, Moscow, 1999.
- I. Calvino "Note 1960", essay (translation). Collected works, vol I, (ed.); Simposium, Saint Petersburg, 2000; AST, Moscow, 2010.
- А. Nove "13 short stories". From the book Superwoobinda (preface, translation). Inostrannaya literatura n.8. Moscow, 2000; Ad Marginem, Moscow, 2001. Winner of the Independent Journalists' award Zoil 2002.
- G. Kiselev (Editing, notes on authors, commentary) Almost Love. Twelve Italian Short Stories. Italian-language anthology. Raduga, Moscow, 2000.
- I. Calvino "American lessons" («Точность», «Наглядность», «Многообразие»). (translation). 2018.
- D. Buzzati Sixty short stories (selected translations). AST, Moscow, 2011.
- D. Buzzati "Seven floors", short story (translation). Inostrannaya literatura, n. 6, Moscow, 2002.
- E. Morovich. Twelve short stories from the collection Everyday Miracles (translation, prefazione). Inostrannaya literatura n. 12, Moscow, 2002.
- Т. Landolfi "The woodcock", short story (translation). Inostrannaya literatura n. 7, Moscow, 2003.
- G. Kiselev. "Landolfi", talk. Ibidem.
- G. Kiselev (editor, notes on authors, commentary) "The Sea the Color of Wine" Italian short stories of the Twentieth century. Italian-language anthology. Raduga, Moscow, 2004.
- G. Kiselev “Landolfi in Russia: adventures and metamorphoses," essay in Italian published in the collection "The 'elsewhere' of Tommaso Landolfi". Bulzoni editore, Rome, 2004.
- D. Buzzati The Bears' Famous Invasion of Sicily (translation, notes; poems translated by М. Anninskaya). Samokat, Moscow, 2006, 2020.
- А. Nove. Short stories from the collection The largest dead whale in Lombardy (translation). Inostrannaya literatura n. 6, Moscow, 2005.
- G. Kiselev "The discreet charm of translation". Inostrannaya literatura n. 6, Moscow, 2005.
- G. Bazzoli "Justice and equality. Biblical models" (translation). Foundation "Tolerantnost', Moscow, 2005.
- G. Kiselev "An anthology of time grappling with reality" (proceedings of the conference devoted to Le rose del ventennio by G.C. Fusco. Alassio Centolibri – Un autore per l’Europa award). I Quaderni della Biblioteca sul mare, Alassio/Ceriale. 2007.
- G. Kiselev "On the path of literature, between the opaque and the open" (proceedings of the conference devoted to Path to the Nest of Spiders by I. Calvino. Alassio Centolibri – Un autore per l’Europa award). I Quaderni della Biblioteca sul mare, Alassio/Ceriale. 2008.
- T. Guerra. A leaf against a lightning. A poem written in prose, translation. Inostrannaya literatura n. 10, 2008.
- G. Kiselev "Eugenio Montale's Repertoire of Memory." (proceedings of the conference devoted to Fuori di casa by E. Montale. Alassio Centolibri – Un autore per l’Europa award). Alassio. 2009.
- C. Goldoni. The Merchant of Smyrna, comedy (translation). Library Center of the Russian State Library M.I. Rudomino, Moscow, 2009.
- G. Kiselev "Italy outside Italy: literature of the 20th century, as seen from Russia", conference talk at the University of Warsaw, published in 6/12/2008. "Italy and Central and Eastern Europe-the last hundred years", Semper, Warszawa. 2009.
- G. Kiselev "A writing that changes place and texture" (proceedings of the conference devoted to Vento largo by F. Biamonti. Alassio Centolibri – Un autore per l’Europa award). I Quaderni della Biblioteca sul mare, Alassio. 2010.
- T. Scarpa. Venice is a Fish (translation, preface). Inostrannaya literatura n. 7, Moscow, 2010; KoLiBri, Moscow, 2010-2011.
- N. De Vita. "The House on a Hill", rhymed short story (translation). KompasGid, Moscow, 2010.
- G. Kiselev "Nico Orengo: a pen loaded with lightness", talk at the round table conference devoted to the book by N. Orengo L’autunno della signora Waal (Alassio Centolibri – Un autore per l’Europa award). I Quaderni della Biblioteca sul mare. Proceedings of the round table conference devoted to L’autunno della signora Waal by N. Orengo, Alassio. 2011.
- T. Scarpa. Fundamental Things, novel (translation). Inostrannaya literatura n. 8. Moscow, 2011; Corpus, Moscow, 2012.
- F. Arminio. Postcards from the Dead, (translation). Inostrannaya literatura n. 1, Misca, 2012. Ad Marginem, Moscow, 2013; «Новые открытки с того света», электронное издание. Видео вступление от переводчика Ad Marginem, Moscow, 2020.
- G. Kiselev "The resounding words of Gina Lagorio", talk at the round table conference devoted to the book by G. Lagorio La spiaggia del lupo (Alassio Centolibri – Un autore per l’Europa award). I Quaderni della Biblioteca sul mare. Proceedings of the round table conference on La spiaggia del lupo by G. Lagorio, Alassio. 2012.
- A. Baricco. Don Giovanni, (translation). Corpus, Moscow, 2013.
- C. Castrillo. "Dew dust" (translation). Anthology of contemporary Swiss dramaturgy, NLO, Moscow, 2013.
- G. Kiselev "Building happiness", talk at the round table conference devoted to the book by G. Arpino Sei stato felice, Giovanni (Alassio Centolibri – Un autore per l’Europa award). I Quaderni della Biblioteca sul mare. Proceedings of the round table conference on G. Arpino's Sei stato felice, Giovanni, Alassio. 2013.
- G. Kiselev. "Facts and Tales of the Serene Island", Preface to the collection, editor of The Enchanted Island. New short stories about Italy. Corpus, Moscow, 2014.
- G. Kiselev The enchanted island. New Tales of Italy. "Facts and Tales of the Serene Island." Translated from the Russian by Caterina and Stefano Garzonio. Transeuropa, 2016.
- C. Goldoni The Man of the World. Comedy, translation. Linguistica, Moscow, 2014.
- G. Kiselev "...by an industrious translator", afterward to Carlo Goldoni's comedy The Man of the World. Linguistica, Moscow, 2014. "The worlds of literary translation", Institute of translation, 2015.
- G. Kiselev "Reportage from a remotely near past", talk at the round table conference devoted to the book by I. Brin Olga in Belgrade (Alassio Centolibri – Un autore per l’Europa award). I Quaderni della Biblioteca sul mare. Proceedings of the round table conference on Olga in Belgrade by I. Brin, Alassio. 2014.
- E. Trevi. Something written (novel, translation). Inostrannaya literatura, n.2, Moscow, 2015. Winner of the ILluminator award 2016, Ad Marginem, Moscow, 2016.
- F.T. Marinetti "Futurist speech to the Venetians" (translation) Nosorog, n. 11, Moscow, 2019.
- C. Gozzi. "The ill-set dinner", comedy (translation, afterword). Nosorog, n. 11, Moscow, 2019.
- F. Forte. The hidden worlds of Dante (translation), Eksmo, Moscow 2021.
- T. Scarpa. Venice is a fish. A new guide (translation, preface), AST Eksklyuzivnaya klassika, Moscow 2024.
- F. Arminio. Sacro Minore (translation, preface), Ad Marginem, Moscow 2024.
- F. Arminio. Vecchie e nuove cartoline dai morti (translation, preface), Ad Marginem, Moscow 2026.
