= Time to Kill =

Time to Kill may refer to:

== Film, TV and fiction ==
- A Time to Kill (Flaiano novel) (Tempo di uccidere), a 1947 novel by Ennio Flaiano
  - Time to Kill (1989 film), a film based on the novel starring Nicolas Cage
- A Time to Kill (Grisham novel), a 1988 legal novel by John Grisham
  - A Time to Kill (1996 film), a feature film adaptation of Grisham's novel
- Star Trek: A Time to Kill, a 2004 novel by David Mack set in the fictional universe of Star Trek: The Next Generation
- Time to Kill (1942 film), an adaptation of Raymond Chandler's novel The High Window used for a Michael Shayne series film starring Lloyd Nolan
- Time to Kill (short film), a 1945 short film starring Betty White
- A Time to Kill (1955 film), a British crime film starring John Le Mesurier
- Time to Kill, a working title of Bangkok Dangerous, directed by the Pang brothers and starring Nicolas Cage
- "Time to Kill" (Danger Man), a 1960 TV episode

== Music ==
- "Time to Kill" (song), a song on the 1970 album Stage Fright by The Band
- "Time to Kill", a song on the 1975 album Free Hand by Gentle Giant
- "Time to Kill", a song on the 1977 album U.K. by UK
- "Time to Kill", a song on the 1987 album Raise Your Fist and Yell by Alice Cooper
- "Time to Kill", a song on the 1989 album The Years of Decay by Overkill
- "Time to Kill", a song on the 1993 album The Battle Rages On... by Deep Purple
- Time to Kill, a 1999 album by Sophie Zelmani
- A Time to Kill (soundtrack), for the 1996 film A Time to Kill

== Other ==
- Duke Nukem: Time to Kill, a 1998 video game
- Time to kill, video game term

== See also ==
- A Time to Kill, a book title taken from literature
