= Stabat Mater (novel) =

Novel by Tiziano Scarpa

- Author: Tiziano Scarpa
- Original title: Stabat Mater
- Language: Italian
- Publication date: 2008
- Publication place: Italy

Stabat Mater is a 2008 Italian-language novel by Tiziano Scarpa. It won the Strega Prize in 2009.

It is set in Venice's Ospedale della Pietà early in the 18th century and was adapted for film as Primavera in 2025. Due to some similarities in content, the novel has been compared to Anna Banti's 1950s story Lavinia fuggita.

== Plot ==
17-year-old Cecilia is one of the orphans at the Ospedale della Pietà, left there by her mother whilst still a baby and with her horizons limited to its walls. From her childhood onwards she has hidden in a lonely corner of the institution at night writing letters to her unknown mother as a way of putting on paper her own thoughts, her attempts to understand the outside world, which she can only see through the filter imposed by the orphanage.

As a child she witnessed a woman handing over a new-born baby and she comes to suspect that she herself is daughter of a young nun or of one of the older orphans. She is unable to discover her mother's identity and over time develops a dialogue with the image of death, sometimes speaking to that as if it were an interlocutor for her mother.

Cecilia and many of the other orphans are musicians, playing violin in concerts with the institution's prestigious women-only consort, hidden behind a grille, with the audience paying in donations to the institution in return. Her playing has reached a very high level. The mystery of the unseen women fascinates and draws in male listeners, with some sometimes asking to see their faces, for example when a select group of girls goes to play for an elderly man near death in return for a legacy to the institution from him.

The elderly priest who leads and teaches the consort has them keep playing the same pieces, reducing their audience numbers and stifling the musicians' creativity and enthusiasm. He is replaced by don Antonio Vivaldi, a younger red-haired priest, who teaches his students how sounds can be used to produce emotions they have never experienced before. He immediately notices Cecilia's abilities, and she becomes one of his favourites.

During a long sleepless night Cecilia meets Vivaldi in her usual deserted room and slowly starts to confide in him as she once did with the image of death. She is still curious to find out her mother's identity, especially after a sister drowns some new-born kittens. Sister Teresa takes pity on Cecilia and shows her the token her mother had left with Cecilia in case she could later come to reclaim her, half of a compass rose, with her mother retaining the other half.

Some mothers do reclaim their children, whilst younger sons of wealthy families marry others, fascinated by their music. Cecilia rebels against the latter, but notices that Vivaldi exhibits her in public as little as possible. She fears this is because he is not confident in her musical abilities, but he corrects her that he in fact is trying to avoid a man seeing her and wanting to marry her. They make a deal that she will refuse any marriage proposals in return for being first violin in the concert.

Cecilia realizes that Vivaldi's jealousy for her is of a different, more dangerous kind. The entire city is now fascinated by the novelty of his music, by his three-movement concertos without preambles, by his notes' imitation of the sounds of nature. However, his attempt to shape the musicians' souls also provokes a final crisis with Cecilia - he takes her to the public slaughterhouse and there forces her to slit open a lamb's throat while a butcher holds it, the very lamb whose entrails will be used as strings for Cecilia's new purpose-made violin. This jolts Cecilia into her final act of rebellion, breaking free from the reassuring but claustrophobic world of the Pietà, setting sail in the faint footsteps of her mother.

== Editions ==
- Tiziano Scarpa (2008). Stabat Mater. 'Supercoralli' collection. Torino: Einaudi. ISBN 88-06-13878-2.
- Tiziano Scarpa (2009). Stabat Mater. 'I grandi premi letterari' collection. preface by Emanuele Trevi. Milano: Mondolibri. ISBN 88-06-13878-2.
- Tiziano Scarpa (2010). Stabat Mater. 'SuperET' collection. Torino: Einaudi. ISBN 978-88-06-20169-2.
- Tiziano Scarpa (2011). Stabat Mater. 'I capolavori del Premio Strega 9' collection. preface by Emanuele Trevi. Milano: Il Sole-24 ore.
- Tiziano Scarpa (2017). Stabat Mater and Famiglia Cristiana. 'Le sfide della vita 3' collection. Cinisello Balsamo: San Paolo.
