= Nievo =

Nievo may refer to:

- Ippolito Nievo (1831–1861), Italian writer, journalist and patriot
- Stanislao Nievo (1928–2006), Italian writer, journalist and director
- Italian destroyer Ippolito Nievo, one of the eight Rosolino Pilo-class destroyers
