= Primavera (film) =

2025 film by Damiano Michieletto

- Italian theatrical release poster
- Directed by: Damiano Michieletto
- Screenplay by: Ludovica Rampoldi, Damiano Michieletto
- Based on: Stabat Mater by Tiziano Scarpa
- Produced by: Carlotta Calori; Nicola Giuliano; Francesca Cima; Viola Prestieri
- Starring: Tecla Insolia; Michele Riondino; Andrea Pennacchi; Fabrizia Sacchi; Valentina Bellè; Stefano Accorsi
- Cinematography: Daria D'Antonio
- Edited by: Walter Fasano
- Music by: Fabio Massimo Capogrosso
- Production companies: Warner Bros. Entertainment Italia; Indigo Film; Moana Films
- Distributed by: Warner Bros. Pictures (Italy); Diaphana Distribution (France)
- Release dates: 6 September 2025 (TIFF); 25 December 2025 (Italy)
- Running time: 111 minutes
- Countries: Italy; France
- Language: Italian

Primavera is a 2025 drama directed by Damiano Michieletto in his feature directorial debut, and written by Ludovica Rampoldi and Michieletto based on the 2008 novel Stabat Mater by Tiziano Scarpa. It stars Tecla Insolia and Michele Riondino. The film had its world premiere in the Special Presentations section of the 50th Toronto International Film Festival on 6 September 2025.

== Plot ==
Early in the 18th century, Ospedale della Pietà is the biggest orphanage in Venice, but it is also where the most talented of the orphans who live there are introduced to the study of music. Its string consort is one of the world’s most highly regarded and gives regular concerts from behind a grille to rich patrons of the orphanage. However, these concerts are losing audience numbers to those at the Incurabili under the direction of Nicola Porpora and so the Pietà's governor decides to re-employ Antonio Vivaldi as its music teacher, conductor and composer.

Cecilia, 20 years old, has spent most of her life in the Pietà and is an extraordinary violinist. The whole group plays Vivaldi's La Follia variations to audition for first violin and - though her rival Laura is the last woman left playing - he instead chooses Cecilia. Frederick IV of Denmark is visiting Venice and she impresses him at the premiere of a sonata Vivaldi has composed for him in less than a day. However, the end of the Ottoman–Venetian War finally brings the return of Sanfermo, a veteran of the Siege of Corfu, whose marriage to Cecilia the governor has arranged in return for a 300 ducat donation to the Pietà.

Such a marriage would mean her giving up her music and so Cecilia has sex with Michele, the greengrocer who supplies the Pietà. This ensures that she fails the virginity test prior to the marriage - it is broken off and she is placed in solitary confinement until Vivaldi demands her release. Another of the Pietà women is married off to Sanfermo in an attempt to quell rumours that Cecilia lost her virginity to Vivaldi and to keep hold of his donation.

Cecilia is invited to a meeting with Sanfermo who - though he initially seems conciliatory - revenges the slight to his honour by breaking her wrist and left hand, thus preventing her playing in the premiere of Juditha triumphans (commissioned from Vivaldi to mark the war's end) and possibly ever again. The governor lies to Vivaldi that Cecilia was injured falling down the stairs and - though the composer is unconvinced - he lacks the courage to avenge her.

Cecilia is given permission to listen to the premiere from a side gallery and - after enjoying the first movement - escapes the Pietà with assistance from its prioress, who was herself also left there as an infant. Vivaldi subtly notices Cecilia has gone whilst the Doge, Council of Ten, Sanfermo and the whole audience applaud him. She takes a boat out of Venice and drops into the water the token her mother had left with her in case she was able to come back and reclaim her. She smiles, released from her obsession with who her real mother was.

== Cast ==
- Tecla Insolia as Cecilia
- Michele Riondino as Antonio Vivaldi
- Andrea Pennacchi as Governor
- Fabrizia Sacchi as Prioress
- Valentina Bellè as Elisabetta Parolin
- Stefano Accorsi as Sanfermo
- Hildegard De Stefano as Laura
- Cosima Centurioni as Marietta
- Federica Girardello as Agnese
- Rebecca Antonaci as Caterina
- Chiara Sacco as Maddalena
- Miko Jarry as King of Denmark

== Soundtrack ==
The soundtrack includes thirteen original pieces by Fabio Massimo Capogrosso, performed by the orchestra and choir of the Teatro La Fenice under the baton of Carlo Boccadoro.

It also includes the following pieces by Vivaldi himself, performed by the Solisti Aquilani, with Daniele Orlando on solo violin:

- Concerto in G minor for strings and basso continuo, RV 152: 1. Allegro molto
- Concerto n. 1 in D major for violin, strings and basso continuo, RV 207: 2. Largo
- Concerto n. 11 in D minor for two violins, cello and orchestra, RV 565: 4. Largo e spiccato
- Concerto n. 1 in E major, Op. 8, RV 269 "La primavera": 1. Allegro

== Production ==
Principal photography took place from October to early December 2024. The film was shot in Rome and Venice.

== Release ==
Paradise City Sales owns the international sales rights to the film. It was released by Warner Bros. Pictures in Italy and by Diaphana Distribution in France.

A teaser clip was released on 21 July 2025. The film had its world premiere in the Special Presentations section of the 50th Toronto International Film Festival on 6 September 2025. It was also screened in the Spotlight section of the 61st Chicago International Film Festival on 18 October 2025, where it won the Audience Award as Best International Feature. The 19th Gasparilla International Film Festival hosted the U.S. Southeast Premiere on 6 March 2026 where the film swept the festival's Grand Jury Award for International Feature and Audience Award for International Feature.

=== Distribution ===
In January 2025, the film was acquired for distribution by Cinéart in Belgium, the Netherlands, and Luxembourg; X Verleih in Germany and Austria; A Contracorriente Films in Spain; Frenetic in Switzerland; and M2 Films in Poland.

Following its premiere, the film was acquired for distribution by Cinema Mondo in Scandinavia, Adastra Cinema in the Baltics, Pris Audiovisuais in Portugal, Filmtrade and Tanweer in Greece, Filmarti Film in Turkey, Beta Film in Bulgaria, Discovery Film in former Yugoslavia, Vertigo Média in Hungary, M2 Films in Poland, Film Europe in the Czech Republic, Plus Films and Imagem Filmes in Latin America, Entermode Corp in South Korea, Swallow Wings in Taiwan, and Rialto Distribution and Moving Story in Australia and New Zealand. In December 2025, it was acquired for distribution by Aya Pro in Japan, Svoekino in Ukraine, and Follow Art in Romania.

== Accolades ==
Award	Date of ceremony	Category	Recipient(s)	Result	Ref.
Chicago International Film Festival	24 October 2025	Audience Award for Best International Feature	Primavera	Won	
Victoria Film Festival	16 February 2026	Best Feature Film	Primavera	Won	
Gasparilla International Film Festival	9 March 2026	Grand Jury Award for International Narrative Feature	Primavera	Won	
BCN Film Fest	24 April 2026	Best Director Best Editing	Damiano Michieletto Walter Fasano	Won	
David di Donatello	6 May 2026	Best Adapted Screenplay	Ludovica Rampoldi	Nominated	
David di Donatello	6 May 2026	Best Actress	Tecla Insolia	Nominated	
David di Donatello	6 May 2026	Best Scores	Fabio Massimo Capogrosso	Won	
David di Donatello	6 May 2026	Best Costume Design	Maria Rita Barbera, Gaia Calderone	Won	
David di Donatello	6 May 2026	Best Make-Up	Vincenzo Mastrantonio, Adele Di Trani, Emanuele De Luca	Nominated	
David di Donatello	6 May 2026	Best Hairstyle	Marta Iacoponi	Won	
David di Donatello	6 May 2026	Best Sound	Gianluca Scarlata, Davide Favargiotti, Daniele Quadroli, Nadia Paone	Won	
Saraqusta Film Festival	27 May 2026	Best Director Best Actress	Damiano Michieletto Tecla Insolia	Won	
Nastro d'Argento	24 June 2026	Best First Feature Best Scores Best Costume Design	Damiano Michieletto Fabio Massimo Capogrosso Maria Rita Barbera, Gaia Calderone	Won	
