= Autumn Story =

Autumn Story may refer to:

- An Autumn Story (novel), a 1947 novel by Tommaso Landolfi
- Autumn Story (Brambly Hedge), children's book 1980
- An Autumn Story (film) (Bir Sonbahar Hikayesi) Turkish film
- Autumn Story (TV series) (Gaeul Donghwa), Korean drama popular in Egypt 2000
- Autumn Story (EP), by Korean boy band Astro

== See also ==
- An Autumn Tale, French film
