= Private Renaissance =

1985 novel by Maria Bellonci

- Author: Maria Bellonci
- Original title: Rinascimento privato
- Translator: William Weaver
- Language: Italian
- Publication place: Italy
- Pages: 464

Private Renaissance (Italian: Rinascimento privato) was the last novel written by the Italian writer Maria Bellonci, published in 1985 by Mondadori. It won the Strega Prize in 1986. It was translated into English by William Weaver and published by William Morrow and Company in 1989.

It is a fictional autobiography of Isabella d'Este, covering the major years of the Italian Renaissance from a private point of view within the court of the Duke of Mantua.

== Structure ==
The book, like other works of Bellonci, is very well documented and accurately based on original documents that the author had the opportunity to study in detail. However, this is not a historical reconstruction, like her previous book about Lucrezia Borgia, although that may perhaps have generated the idea for Private Renaissance, but it is a true historical novel, with a few inventions by the author. These include the introduction of the fictional character of Robert de la Pole, an English clergyman who writes to Isabella over several years from various points around Europe, who while fictional nevertheless appears to have been inspired by the historical English Cardinal Reginald Pole.

The inclusion of this figure in the novel makes it possible to introduce important historical figures and events in the context of the period, even if they did not come into direct contact with Isabella. It is also valuable in replacing the figure of the narrator – irreconcilable feat with the book's autobiographical form – and the figures of other speakers who may have historically existed as sources for Bellonci, but it can not be used directly without compromising the flow of the text itself. Working with a fictional character, the author avoids exaggerating one or more actual figures and respects historical accuracy.

Alongside the memories of her protagonist, Isabella d'Este, Bellonci develops the relationship between her and the Englishman (called Anglicus) into an uncanny connection: on the one hand, there is an instant attraction towards this devoted and distant figure; on the other, there is a perplexity because of his unconventional ways. Isabella solves the difficult question of how to respond through her tacit consent to receiving his letters – while she does not attempt to discourage him from writing to her, she also does not send him any replies.

== Plot ==
The book is divided into seven parts, interspersed with twelve letters of Robert de la Pole. The narrative is constructed as a long flashback that takes place in 1533, when Isabella, aged almost sixty, is writing her memoirs in the so-called Clocks' Room of the Ducal Palace in Mantua. Apart from some references to the present and the distant past, the narrative takes place mostly in chronological order between the years 1500 and 1533, which is the date when Isabella tells her story, ending the main events of her life (she died in the year 1539).
