= Idolina Landolfi =

Italian novelist, poet and literary critic

- Born: 19 May 1958; Rome, Italy
- Died: 27 June 2008 (aged 50); Florence, Italy
- Occupations: Writer, translator and literary critic
- Relatives: Tommaso Landolfi
- Writing career
- Period: 1990–2008
- Genre: Poetry

Maria Idolina Landolfi (born 19 May 1958 in Rome – died 27 June 2008 in Florence) was an Italian novelist, poet and literary critic. She was daughter of the writer Tommaso Landolfi and the principal curator of his works.

In 1996 she founded the Landolfian Studies Center, of which she was the president until her death. She collaborated on the cultural pages of the newspaper Il Giornale until May 2008.

Her personal library was donated to the Humanist Library of Siena.

== Prose and poetry ==
- Scemo d'amore : racconti, Roma, Empiria, 1998. ISBN 88-85303-64-1
- I litosauri, Roma, Laterza, 1999. ISBN 88-421-0494-9
- Senza titolo testo di Idolina Landolfi, xilografia di Antonio Baglivo, Salerno, SemInAria, 2001
- con Ester Pes, Attacchi d'amore, Milano, ES, 1996. ISBN 88-86534-24-8
- Sotto altra stella, Pasian di Prato, Campanotto Editore, 1996
- Matracci e storte: novelle e novellette mercuriali, Napoli, Graus, 2004. ISBN 88-834-6087-1
- Non mi destare, amore, Firenze, Il Bisonte, 2010

== Translations ==
- Gina Barkhordar Nahai, L' incanto del pavone, traduzione di Idolina Landolfi e William S. Maury, Milano, Rizzoli, 1991
- Annie Ernaux, Passione semplice, Milano, Rizzoli, 1992
- Isidore Ducasse, comte de Lautréamont, I canti di Maldoror. Poesie. Lettere, introduzione, traduzione e note di Idolina Landolfi, Milano, Biblioteca Universale Rizzoli, 1995
- Matthew Kneale, Nero Tamigi, Milano, Bompiani, 1997
- Jean-Claude Lavie, L' amore e il delitto perfetto, Milano, Baldini & Castoldi, 1998
- Donna Tartt, Dio di illusioni, Milano, Rizzoli, 1998
- Villiers de l'Isle-Adam, Claire Lenoir, Latina, L'Argonauta, 1999
- Murray Bail, Eucalyptus, Milano, Mondadori, 1999
- Paule Constant, Confidenza per confidenza, Milano, Rizzoli, 2000
- Michel Tournier, Eleazar, ovvero La sorgente e il roveto, Milano, Garzanti, 2000
- Adam Armstrong, Il grido della pantera, Milano, Rizzoli, 2001
- Elie Wiesel, Michael de Saint Cheron, Il male e l'esilio : dieci anni dopo, Milano, Baldini & Castoldi, 2001
- Frances Mayes, Sotto il sole della Toscana, Milano, Rizzoli, 2001
- Frances Mayes, ''Beautiful Toscana, Milano, Rizzoli, 2001
- Michel Tournier, "Celebrazioni", Milano, Garzanti, 2001
- Darin Strauss, Chang and Eng Bunker, Milano, Rizzoli, 2001
- Jean-Christophe Grangé, Il concilio di pietra, Milano, Superpocket, 2003
- Jean-Christophe Grangé, Il volo delle cicogne, Milano, Garzanti, 2003
- Jean-Christophe Grangé, I fiumi di porpora, Milano, Garzanti, 2005
- Donna Tartt, Il piccolo amico, traduzione di Idolina Landolfi e Giovanni Maccari, Milano, Superpocket, 2005
- Eva Stachniak, Il giardino di Venere, Milano, Rizzoli, 2005
