= Mano rubata =

- Written by: Tommaso Landolfi
- Directed by: Alberto Lattuada
- Composer: Armando Trovajoli
- Original language: Italian

Production
- Producers: Enrico Vanzina, Carlo Vanzina
- Running time: 55 min.

Original release
- Network: Canale 5
- Release: 1989

Mano rubata (stolen hand) is a 1989 Italian television movie directed by Alberto Lattuada. The film concerns gambling and is the last work of Lattuada.

== Plot ==
The story takes place in Paris. Günther Mayer, a young writer, is impressed by a beautiful woman whom he sees for the first time through the window of a flower shop. After that he meets her briefly for a few times.

The opportunity to meet the beautiful stranger occurs at a party in the house of Marianne, a friend of his. Among the guests there is a writer, a professor of psychology, an aristocrat, a starlet, a painter, and a hypochondriac woman.

The stranger, Juliette Carfienne, arrives at Marianne's house while Günther, bored, is leaving. After they meet she refuses Günther's offers of friendship. He offers the guests a game: poker elimination that will finally have one winner only and who will be the only one who will stay dressed; losers must undress themselves or commit suicide. In the last hand between Juliette and Günther, the latter wins. All losers undress except Juliette who chooses to commit suicide. As a sign of defiance, Günther takes an automatic pistol from his jacket and hands it to Juliet. While the latter is about to shoot, Günther removes the weapon from her hand and wants to be who lost the game; then he undresses. Juliette declares herself defeated and also strips.

After the party, the guests leave; on the stairs Günther tells Juliet that he has only seen her eyes; both leave together.

== Cast ==
- Carmen Loderus, as Juliette Carfienne
- Ralph Schicha, as Günther Mayer
- Milena Vukotic, as Fabienne
- Geneviève Omini, as Marianne
- Clément Harari, as a professor of psychology
- Christiane Jean, as a female hypochondriac
- Christian de Tillière, as an aristocrat
- Roger Miremont, as a painter
- Patrick Bonnel, as a writer
- Herma Vos, as a starlette
- Marie Florestan
