= La pietra lunare =

1939 novel by Tommaso Landolfi

- Author: Tommaso Landolfi
- Language: Italian
- Publisher: Vallecchi
- Publication date: 1939
- Publication place: Italy
- Pages: 164

La pietra lunare (lit. 'The Moonstone') is a 1939 novel by the Italian writer Tommaso Landolfi. It is about a young poet who falls in love with a seamstress from an impoverished aristocratic family who turns out to have cloven goat hoofs as feet, something only he seems capable of noticing. The novel combines satire about the petite bourgeoisie with fantastical elements.
