= Paolo Cognetti =

Italian writer

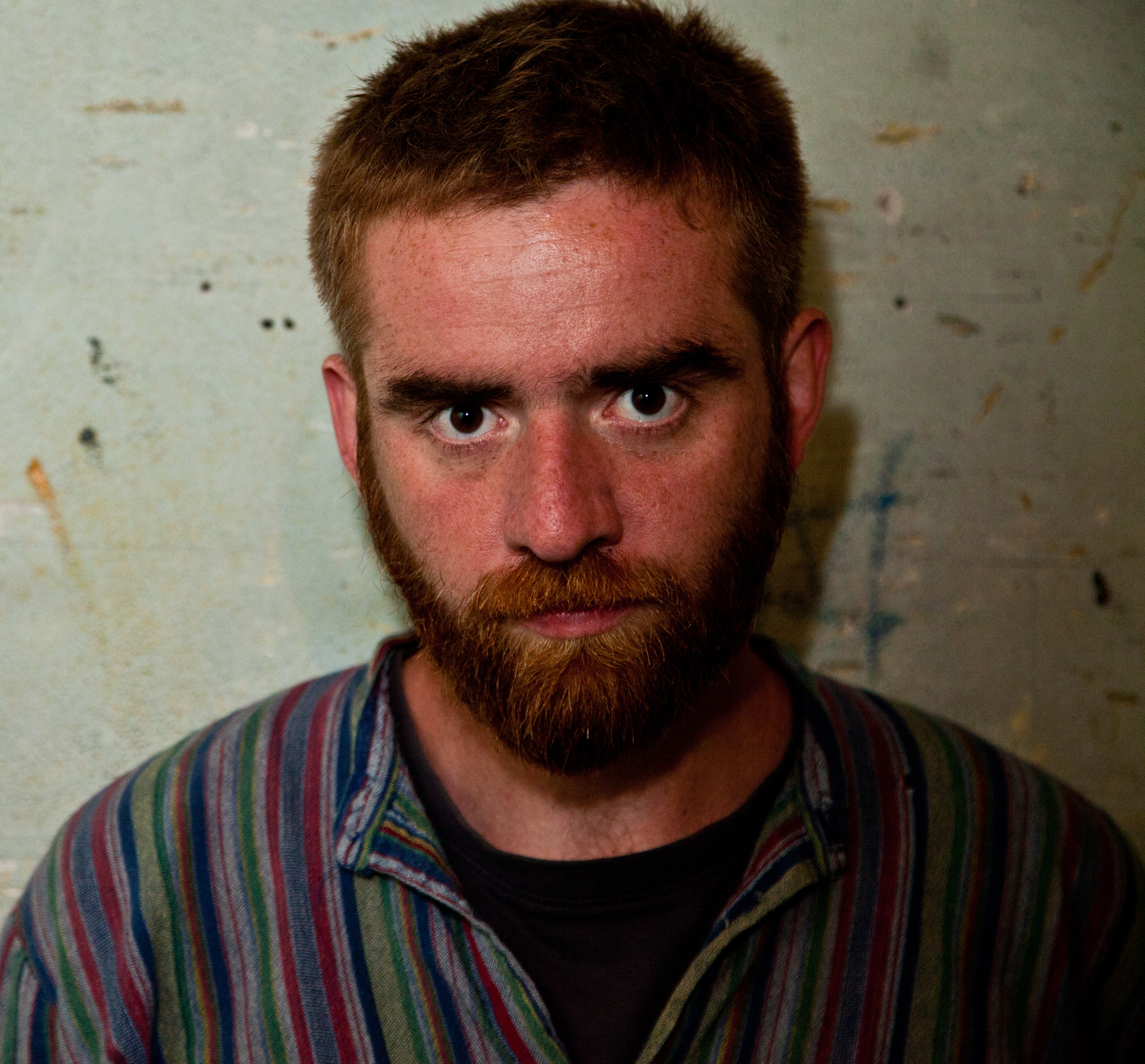
- Born: 27 January 1978 (age 48); Milan, Italy
- Occupation: Writer
- Awards: Strega Prize; Prix Médicis

Paolo Cognetti (born 27 January 1978) is an Italian writer and filmmaker, winner of the 2017 Strega Prize.

== Biography ==
Born in Milan, he initially studied mathematics at university, but quit to enroll at Milan's film-making school Civica Scuola di Cinema «Luchino Visconti», where he graduated in 1999.

His first work as a writer was the short story Fare ordine; he then published various collections of short stories.

In 2016, he published his first novel The Eight Mountains which earned him the Strega Prize, Italy′s most prestigious literary award, as well as various international awards, such as the Prix Médicis étranger, the Prix François Sommer, and the English Pen Translates Award. It was adapted in 2022 to a film of the same name.

He has dedicated various books and documentaries to New York City, a city he visits frequently. A keen hiker and lover of the mountains, he lives in the Alps for a few months every year.

== Works ==
- Fare ordine. [Genere: storia d'amore; 1 racconto da 5 fermate], Milan, 2003
- Manuale per ragazze di successo, Minimum Fax, Rome, 2004
- Una cosa piccola che sta per esplodere, Minimum Fax, Rome, 2007
- Sofia si veste sempre di nero, Minimum Fax, Rome, 2012
- Il nuotatore, with Mara Cerri, Rome, 2013
- Le otto montagne (The Eight Mountains), Einaudi, Turin, 2016
- La felicità del Lupo, (The Lovers), Einaudi, Turin, 2021
- Giù nella valle, Einaudi, Turin, 2023

=== Essays ===
- New York è una finestra senza tende, 2010
- Il ragazzo selvatico. Quaderno di montagna, (The Wild Boy: A Memoir), Milan, 2013
- A pesca nelle pozze più profonde, Roma, 2014
- Tutte le mie preghiere guardano verso ovest, 2014
- Senza mai arrivare in cima, (Without Ever Reaching the Summit: A Journey), Turin, Einaudi, 2018
- L'Antonia. Poesie, lettere e fotografie di Antonia Pozzi scelte e raccontate da Paolo Cognetti, Milan, Ponte alle Grazie, 2021.

== Filmography ==
- Vietato scappare (1999)
- Isbam (2000)
- Box (2001)
- Tango (2001)
- Cameracar (2002)
- Scrivere/New York, 2004
- Sogni di Grande Nord, 2021
- The Eight Mountains, 2022 (story)
- Fiore mio, 2024
