= Spatriati =

2021 novel by Mario Desiati

Spatriati: A Novel is a novel by Italian writer Mario Desiati. Originally published in Italian as Spatriati by Einaudi in 2021, it won the literary prize Premio Strega in 2022. It is also his first novel to be translated into English, published in the US by Other Press and translated by Michael F. Moore.

== Plot ==
The novel is narrated in the first person by Francesco, and it recounts his life from his teens in the 80s and 90s, through to the present day, through the lens of his tumultuous relationship with (and desire for) his classmate and friend, the outgoing Claudia and their time spent living in Berlin. Both Claudia and Francesco are misfits in their hometown, and both explore their queerness at various times in their lives.

== Themes ==
Set in the 1990s and 2000s in Desiati's hometown of Martina Franca (Puglia, Italy) and Berlin, the novel explores themes of identity, generational conflict, queerness, sexuality and desire, and the inner conflict between feeling different yet wanting to remain true to one's roots; the word spatriato in Martina Franca dialect could be translated as 'misfit' or irregular. The novel's translator, Michael F. Moore, has described the town of Martina Franca as being so central to the book that it is one of the protagonists.
