= Un'anima persa =

Un’anima persa is a novel by Italian writer Giovanni Arpino, published in 1966. The novel takes place in Turin in the 1960s and it is written in form of a diary, similarly to La suora giovane, one of the most famous works of the author's. Literary critic Lorenzo Mondo saw in this novel a representation of madness similar to the one described by Robert Louis Stevenson in The Strange Case of Dr. Jekyll and Mister Hyde. It was adapted for cinema by Dino Risi as Anima persa in 1977.

== Plot ==
Tino is an orphan living in a boarding house.

A few days before turning seventeen he goes back to his hometown, Turin, to prepare for his graduation exam, and he is hosted by Aunt Galla and Uncle Serafino Calandra in their big house situated at the foot of a hill.

Uncle Serafino's twin brother, called "The Professor", also lives in the house. He used to work in Africa, before becoming crazy and being locked in the attic of his brother's house, where he spends his time recording insects and details of his room with a camera.

No one has ever seen him, except for Uncle Serafino, who takes care of him, feeds him, washes him and pays a prostitute, Iris, to entertain him.

When Serafino goes out he takes the key of the attic with him, so nobody can disturb the Professor, but Aunt Galla and the maid Annetta, peek at the mysterious twin through the door lock. After a while, Tino finds out that Uncle Serafino had been fired a very long time ago and lied to Aunt Galla pretending to go to work every morning since then, and also that he had spent gambling all of the money saved for Tino's studies.

Tino spends a night with the uncle in a gambling house and meets the Duke, an old friend of the uncle's and a croupier of the house.

The next day the Duke takes Serafino home, because he had been sick the night before.

Aunt Galla takes the keys of the attic to feed the Professor and gets in with Tino and Annetta.

There they find out that Iris had been kidnapped by Uncle Serafino and that the Professor has never existed: each time Serafino pretended to go to work, he locked himself in the attic and faked being his twin brother.

== Sources ==
- Lorenzo Mondo, introduction to Un'anima persa, Mondadori, 1966
- Piovene, Guido (9 March 1966). "Gli umani "mostri" di Giovanni Arpino". La Stampa.
