= Maria Bellonci =

Italian writer (1902–1986)

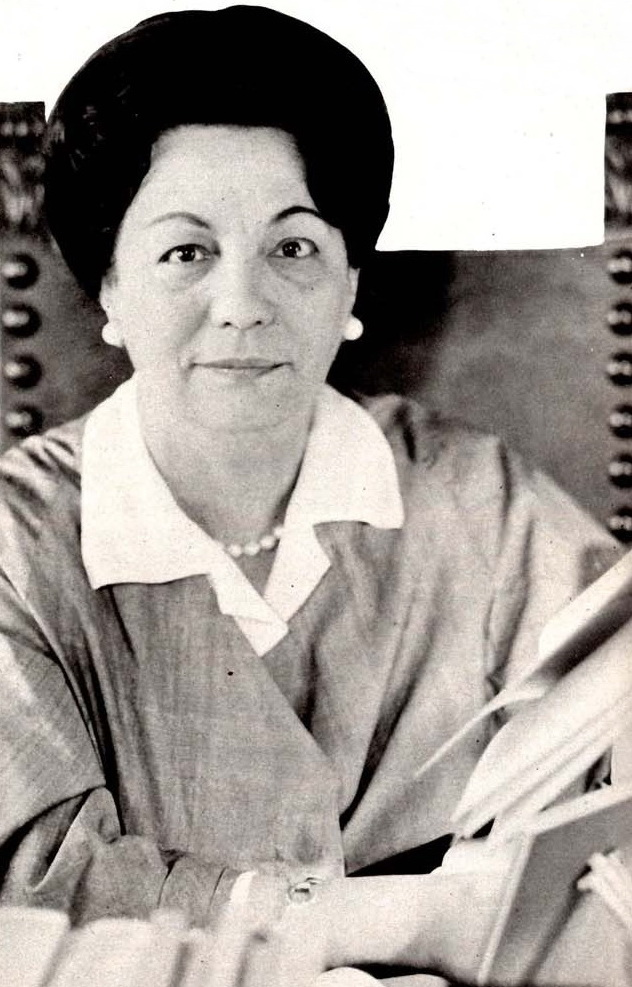
Maria Bellonci, 1975

Maria Villavecchia Bellonci (30 November 1902 – 13 May 1986) was an Italian writer, historian and journalist, known especially for her biography of Lucrezia Borgia. She and Guido Alberti established the Strega Prize in 1947.

== Biography ==
Bellonci was born Maria Villavecchia in Rome on 30 November 1902. Her father, Gerolamo Vittorio Villavecchia, was a professor of chemistry, and came from an aristocratic Piedmontese family, while her mother, Felicita Bellucci, came from Umbria. She had three younger siblings, a brother Leo and a sister, Gianna.

From 1913, she studied at the Liceo Umberto, graduating in 1921. She married the journalist Goffredo Bellonci in 1928.

Following the Second World War, the Belloncis established a salon at their residence, the Amici della domenica (Friends of Sunday) inviting Italian literati to discuss the promotion of Italian culture.

Bellonci's husband died in August 1964.

Bellonci died on 13 May 1986 in Rome.

== Career ==
=== Literary ===
Aged 19, Bellonci wrote Clio e le amazzoni, a novel that remained unpublished, but which circulated in Italian literary circles and introduced her to her future husband Goffredo Bellonci.

Bellonci's literary debut was in 1939 with the acclaimed biography of Lucrezia Borgia, published in Italian by Mondadori, and translated into twelve languages. This and her subsequent works on historical subjects, based on rich and detailed research of extant primary documents, were lauded for their vivid reconstructions and psychological motivations of their characters from which the public obtained a credible picture of history stripped of legends and accretions over the centuries. She concentrated on the great Renaissance families: Borgias, Estes, Gonzagas and Sforzas. Especially welcomed was her focus on women in the Renaissance and their interactions with power. Although these works were written in the genre of historical fiction, they were fully documented histories.

By 1972, Bellonci was beginning to experiment with the form. For the first time, in the compendium Tu vipera gentile, she introduced fictional characters in order to propel the historical narrative. Similarly, her final novel Rinascimento Privato (Private Renaissance) which came out in 1985, was written in the first person by the protagonist Isabella d'Este; she added fictional characters to describe historical events, in essence creating a metahistorical novel. Furthermore, contrasting this depiction of Isabella with her previous appearances in Bellonci's works (e.g. in Lucrezia Borgia), Bellonci was able to show how subjective and ideologically malleable historical interpretation may be.

=== Culture, activism, journalism ===
Bellonci was actively involved in the promotion of Italian culture. Along with her husband and Guido Alberti, she established the literary Premio Strega in 1947. She recounted its history in her 1971 book Come un racconto. Gli anni del Premio Strega.

She was a columnist in periodicals such as Il punto (1958–64), and Il Messaggero (1964-70). Many of these articles were compiled and republished in Pubblici segreti (two volumes, 1965 and 1989). Her collection of articles on Italian cities was republished posthumously in Segni sul muro (Signs on the wall, 1989).

=== Translation ===
Bellonci was inspired by Stendhal and translated some of his work into Italian: Vanina Vanini e altre cronache italiane (1961), La duchessa di Paliano (1994). Among her other translations are Alexandre Dumas' I tre moschettieri (1977) and Emile Zola's Nana (1955).

== Awards ==
Bellonci was awarded the Viareggio Prize in 1939 for Lucrezia Borgia. In 1979, she won the Premio San Gerolamo for her literary oeuvre. She was posthumously awarded the Strega prize in 1986 for Rinascimento privato.

== Bibliography ==
- Lucrezia Borgia. La sua vita e i suoi tempi, Milano, A. Mondadori, 1939 (The Life and Times of Lucrezia Borgia (translated by Bernard and Barbara Wall), Harcourt Brace (1953).
- Segreti dei Gonzaga, Milano, A. Mondadori, 1947.
- Milano Viscontea, Torino, Edizioni Radio Italiana, 1956.
- Pubblici segreti, Milano, A. Mondadori, 1965.
- Come un racconto. Gli anni del Premio Strega, Milano, Club degli Editori, 1969.
- Tu vipera gentile. Delitto di stato, Soccorso a Dorotea, Tu vipera gentile, Milano, A. Mondadori, 1972.
- Marco Polo, Torino, ERI, 1982.
- Rinascimento privato, Milano, A. Mondadori, 1985.
- Io e il Premio Strega, Milano, A. Mondadori, 1987. ISBN 88-04-30197-X.
- Segni sul muro, Milano, A. Mondadori, 1988. ISBN 88-04-31881-3.
- Pubblici segreti n. 2, Milano, A. Mondadori, 1989. ISBN 88-04-33086-4.
- Il Premio Strega, Milano, A. Mondadori, 1995. ISBN 88-04-40540-6.
- Gente in castello, Milano, A. Mondadori, 2007. ISBN 978-88-04-57410-1.
