= Time to Kill (1989 film) =

- French poster
- Directed by: Giuliano Montaldo
- Screenplay by: Furio Scarpelli; Paolo Virzì; Giacomo Scarpelli; Giuliano Montaldo
- Based on: A Time to Kill; 1947 novel by Ennio Flaiano
- Produced by: Leo Pescarolo; Guido De Laurentiis
- Starring: Nicolas Cage; Ricky Tognazzi; Giancarlo Giannini
- Cinematography: Blasco Giurato
- Edited by: Alfredo Muschietti
- Music by: Ennio Morricone
- Production companies: Reteitalia; DMV Distribuzione; Ellepi Film; Italfrance; Dania Film
- Distributed by: Titanus (Italy); Metro-Goldwyn-Mayer (France)
- Release dates: September 10, 1989 (Venice); October 27, 1989 (Italy)
- Running time: 110 minutes
- Countries: Italy; France
- Language: English

Time to Kill (Italian: Tempo di uccidere) is a 1989 Italian historical drama film starring Nicolas Cage, and Italian actors Ricky Tognazzi and Giancarlo Giannini. It is directed by Giuliano Montaldo. The film is set in 1936, when Ethiopia was under Italian invasion, and was filmed in Zimbabwe. It is based on the novel with the same name written by Ennio Flaiano.

== Plot ==
Lieutenant Silvestri suffers a toothache and decides to travel to an aid station at a nearby construction site in the dead of night, ahead of his unit which strikes camp the next morning and follows in a convoy. On the way, his driver crashes the truck. prompting Silvestri to continue on foot and get lost, only to rejoin his unit at the main camp days later to finally get his tooth pulled.

It turns out Silvestri failed to find a physician at the construction site and decided to continue on foot to division headquarters when a weird young man gave him misleading directions for a short cut off the main road. On his way through the jungle, Silvestri lost his way and found himself at a dead end at a pool below a waterfall where an Ethiopian girl was bathing. Unable to ask her for directions since both did not speak each other's language, he raped her. He then gave her his broken watch and she inexplicably joined him on his way. While taking refuge in a cave, Silvestri then shot at a hyena, but one of his shots ricocheted, killing the girl. He dropped her body in a narrow crevice and, after taking back the watch, concealed the body with rocks to stop the hyenas from getting to it. After removing all traces of the incident, he decided to make his way back past the creek. On the way, he came across some Ethiopians in a weird kind of procession which he held to be the girl's relatives before finally rejoining the main road and getting a ride on another military truck to headquarters. Hearing out his story, his second-in-command advises him to let the matter rest.

Later, Silvestri's unit kills civilians in retribution for attacks by insurgents in the area and he recognizes various civilians among the dead that he had seen on the procession the day before. He also meets Elias, wearing Silvestri's pants (which he seems to have forgotten at the site), and Johannes, Elias' father.

He finally receives news that he has been granted a furlough, but while celebrating with his friend and a superior officer, he learns that the white turban the girl had been wearing meant she had leprosy. From a festering wound on his hand, he concludes he has contracted the disease himself and seeks out a doctor whom he tells a cover story of doing research for a book. The doctor describes the symptoms of the disease, deepening his fears. When the doctor insists on examining his hand, he gives the doctor a false name and even shoots at him before boarding a ship to Italy.

As he tries to return to his wife back home, Silvestri hides from his former unit and even steals from them, finally going into hiding with Johannes who turns out to be the father of the girl. After surviving a bout of illness which might have been imaginary, Johannes explains to Silvestri that his daughter Mariam had not in fact been ill. Revealing to the father how she actually died, Silvestri leads him to her grave.

== Cast ==
- Nicolas Cage as Lt. Enrico Silvestri
- Ricky Tognazzi as Mario
- Giancarlo Giannini as Major (Cesare)
- Patrice Flora Praxo as Mariam
- Gianluca Favilla as Army Driver
- Georges Claisse as Dr. Tiberi
- Robert Liensol as Joannes

== Reception ==
Silvia Lilli of Il Tolomeo argued that the novel's anti-colonialist perspective had been "severely diluted" in the film, writing that it had resulted in a "trivialization that reduces the colonial setting to the tropes of exoticism, failing to interrogate the dynamics between the colonized and the colonizer."
