= L'ombra delle colline =

L'ombra delle colline (The hills' shadow) is a novel, written by Giovanni Arpino in 1964, in which the author describes the apprehensions and the disillusion of a young man, who, when he was a child, had lived personally the events of the partisan war, at the end of the Second World War. Thanks to this novel, Arpino won the Strega Prize in 1964.

== Plot ==
The novel opens with the description of one of the nightmares, which crowd the nights of Stefano Illuminati, the main character. The nightmares had begun from an episode of 1943. Stefano, who was 13 years old and lived in the Langhe, occupied by the Nazis, had killed as a joke a German man with a revolver stolen to his father, that was a fascist colonel. Then he had hidden the body, not saying anything to anybody, not even to his trusted friend Francesco, with whom he had talked about a similar project.

Twenty years later, Stefano lives in Rome; he hasn't returned to his family in Piedmont for many years. Coming from a difficult year, disappointed, he decides to go on a journey to the Langhe, to make order in his life. He is followed by Laura, named as Lu, who was his mistress. Lu and Stefano had been closely to have a child, but they had renounced and their relationship had become a simple friendship, even if Lu is haunted by the thought of her missed motherhood.

During the slow voyage, with stages Pisa, Bolsena, Piacenza and Campione d'Italia before arriving in Piedmont, Stefano recurs his life. Stefano's grandfather was a great one for parties, woman and food; antifascist, he is dead just after the Italy's join in the Second World War. In a big house in the Piedmontese countryside Stefano spent the summer playing with his best friend Francesco, son of a farmer. Doro, who takes care about fields and barns, has communist sympathies; he will die thrown in a well, desperate for the death of a pig, who was his economical hope during the period of the nazi's occupation.

Stefano's father, Giacomo Illuminati, husband of a grandfather's daughter, is an austere soldier, army's colonel, that tries to instill in Stefano the discipline, obliging him to answer "comandi" to every calling. Convinced supporter of the fascist regime, the colonel performs service in Piacenza, where Stefano and his mother spent the winter and where Stefano has to participate as a balilla to the youth rallies.

The colonel renounces to participate to military expeditions to stay close to his family and this causes him great moan. His beliefs fall after the 1943 armistice: forced to escape from Piacenza to break out from Germans, he arrives in the Langhe, where Stefano and his mother had been living since a long time: he is unrecognizable, turned into his own shadow, with a long beard and a wasted uniform, that was unthinkable.

The killing's episode of a German happen during the following months. At the beginning of 1944 Stefano, dizzy by the facts, wants to do something, and, 14 years old, he decides to escape. In Milan he managed to make himself look older and in a barrack of the fascist Guardia Repubblicana give him a warrant and send him to La Spezia, where he's recruited in the Decima Mas. In the following months the oldest fellow soldiers wait the occasion to do something in vain. Stefano escapes and returns home when two marines older than him unsuccessfully try to introduce him in a brothel.

In Piedmont, there is the rapprochement with Francesco, and also his join to the partisan fight. Stefano is in Turin on the Liberation day (25 April). In the following years Stefano is involved in left wing movements, then he moved to Rome, where he starts to work in an office. The colonel remains alone in the Langhe house, with the company of the faithful housewife Caterina, always plunged in empty studies, without seeing Stefano for many years.

When Stefano and Lu arrive at colonel's house, the relationship between father and son is difficult and superficial, but the strictness of the colonel is only a mask. When he talks with Lu, the colonel asks constantly of Stefano, he wants to know about his life and his success. Stefano, before leaving, meets again Francesco, distrusted from the youth enthusiasms, convinced not to have succeeded to realise what he fought for. The voyage seems to have restored him because he concludes that memories won't be abandoned and that we will be condemned only if the readers could refuse to express the secret goodness that wait us every morning.

== Editions ==
- Giovanni Arpino, L'ombra delle colline, Mondadori, 1964, p. 260
- Giovanni Arpino, L'ombra delle colline, Lindau, 2016, p. 248, ISBN 978-88-6708-539-2
