= The Forbidden Room (1977 film) =

1977 film by Dino Risi

- Italian theatrical release poster by Piero Ermanno Iaia
- Italian: Anima persa
- Directed by: Dino Risi
- Screenplay by: Bernardino Zapponi; Dino Risi
- Based on: Un'anima persa by Giovanni Arpino
- Produced by: Pio Angeletti; Adriano De Micheli
- Starring: Vittorio Gassman; Catherine Deneuve; Danilo Mattei; Anicee Alvina
- Cinematography: Tonino Delli Colli
- Edited by: Alberto Gallitti
- Music by: Francis Lai
- Production companies: Dean Film; Les Productions Fox Europa
- Distributed by: Fox/Dean Film
- Release dates: 20 January 1977 (Italy); 23 March 1977 (France)
- Running time: 100 minutes
- Countries: Italy; France
- Language: Italian

The Forbidden Room (Italian: Anima persa), also known as Lost Soul, is a 1977 thriller film co-written and directed by Dino Risi, based on the 1966 novel Un'anima persa by Giovanni Arpino. A co-production between Italy and France, the film stars Vittorio Gassman, Catherine Deneuve, Danilo Mattei and Anicee Alvina. The plot follows a young aspiring artist who arrives in Venice to stay at the old mansion of his uncle and aunt, where he begins to notice strange occurrences.

== Plot ==
Nineteen-year-old Tino Zanetti arrives in Venice to attend art class and stay with his uncle and aunt, Fabio and Elisa Stolz. He immediately notices the uneasy atmosphere hovering over the large, partially dilapidated house, which has belonged to Elisa's family for centuries. Fabio, an engineer for the local gas company, is a strict and domineering man who often treats his fragile and submissive wife, Elisa, with contempt. When Tino discovers a staircase leading to the attic, Elisa warns him not to go up there.

One night, Tino hears strange noises and a piano melody coming from the attic. The next day, while Fabio and Elisa are out, Tino learns from the elderly housekeeper, Annetta, that Fabio's mentally ill brother lives in the locked room in the attic. Looking through a peephole, Tino sees a man behaving erratically who looks a lot like Fabio. When Elisa arrives home shortly afterwards, she explains to Tino that Fabio's brother, Berto, is a former science professor who suddenly descended into insanity. Fabio, the only person who is allowed into the room, looks after Berto and has hired a prostitute who visits his brother weekly.

Elisa tells Tino that Berto was obsessed with Beba, her ten-year-old daughter from her first marriage, and that when he suddenly became aggressive one day, Beba was so frightened that she ran away and died after falling into a canal. Since then, Berto has secluded himself in the attic, blaming himself for Beba's death. Fabio, however, gives Tino a different version of the story, claiming that Elisa came to hate Beba because of the bond she had developed with Fabio, seeing him as a father figure. When Beba fell ill with bronchitis, Elisa deliberately neglected her daughter's health, causing her to die.

Unsure of whom to believe, Tino goes to the local cemetery to look for Beba's grave, but cannot find it. He discovers that Fabio has not been to work for over ten years and lives off his wealthy wife, squandering her fortune in the casino. Eventually, Tino realizes that Berto does not exist and that the madman in the attic is Fabio himself. It is also revealed that Beba never existed; as Elisa appears, dressed in children's clothes, Fabio reveals that their relationship began when Elisa was still a child, so he makes her dress as the little girl that he loved. Disturbed, Tino leaves Venice to return home.

== Cast ==
- Vittorio Gassman as Fabio Stolz
- Catherine Deneuve as Elisa Stolz
- Danilo Mattei as Tino Zanetti
- Anicée Alvina as Lucia Pandin
- Ester Carloni as Annetta
- Michele Capnist as the duke
- Gino Cavalieri as Professor Sattin

== Production ==
The Forbidden Room was based on the 1966 novel Un'anima persa by Italian author Giovanni Arpino. Director Dino Risi had adapted a previous novel by Arpino, in Scent of a Woman (1974).

Risi's adaptation of Un'anima persa changed the novel's location from Turin to Venice and changed the names, features and characteristics of some characters such as Tino's uncle and aunt Galla.

== Release ==
The Forbidden Room was released theatrically in Italy by Fox/Dean Film on 20 January 1977. In Italy, the film grossed a total of 857,364,083 Italian lire domestically. It was released in France on 23 March 1977 as Âmes perdues.

== See also ==
- List of Italian films of 1977
