= Giovanni Arpino =

Italian writer (1927–1987)

Giovanni Arpino (27 January 1927 – 10 December 1987) was an Italian writer and journalist.

== Life ==
Born in Pola, Italy (now Croatia) to Piedmontese parents, Arpino moved to Bra in the Province of Cuneo. Here he married Caterina Brero before moving to Turin, where he remained for the rest of his life.

He graduated in 1951 with a thesis on the Russian poet Sergei Yesenin. The following year he made his literary debut with the novel Sei stato felice, Giovanni (1952), published by Einaudi.

Arpino took up sports journalism, writing for the daily papers La Stampa and Il Giornale. Together with Gianni Brera at the La Gazzetta dello Sport, he brought a new literary quality to Italian writing on sport. His most important work in this line was the 1977 football novel Azzurro tenebra. In Italy, he got to know the Argentinian writer and fellow sports enthusiast Osvaldo Soriano.

Arpino also wrote plays, short stories, epigrams, and stories for children.

He won the Strega Prize in 1964 with L'ombra delle colline, was selected for the Premio Campiello of 1972 with Randagio è l'eroe, and won the 1980 SuperCampiello with Il fratello italiano. His novels are characterised by a dry and ironic style.

His novel Un delitto d'onore was adapted for film as Pietro Germi's highly regarded 1962 comedy Divorce, Italian Style, starring Marcello Mastroianni.

His story Il buio e il miele was adapted into two films: Dino Risi's Profumo di donna, with Vittorio Gassman. American Martin Brest directed the English-language Scent of a Woman (1992), which earned Al Pacino an Academy Award for Best Actor.

Arpino died in Turin in 1987. His birthplace of Bra has celebrated his links to that town by establishing a multifunctional cultural centre and a prize for children's literature.

== Works ==
- Sei stato felice, Giovanni (1952)
- Gli anni del giudizio (1958)
- La suora giovane (1959)
- Un delitto d'onore (1960)
- Una nuvola d'ira (1962)
- L'ombra delle colline (1962)
- Un'anima persa (1966)
- La babbuina (1967)
- Il buio e il miele (1969) translated as Scent of a Woman (2012)
- Randagio è l'eroe (1972)
- Racconti di vent’anni (1974)
- L'assalto al treno ed altre storie (1974)
- Rafé e Micropiede (1974)
- Domingo il favoloso (1975)
- Il primo quarto di luna (1976)
- Azzurro tenebra (1977)
- Il fratello italiano (1980)
- Le mille e una Italia (1980)
- Un gran mare di gente (1981)
- Bocce ferme (1982)
- La sposa segreta (1983)
- Il contadino Genè (1985)
- Passo d'addio (1986)
- La trappola amorosa (postumo, 1988)

In 2005 Mondadori published a volume of selected works edited by the literary critic Giorgio Bàrberi Squarotti.

== Filmography ==
- In Renzo e Luciana, an episode from Boccaccio '70 taken from Italo Calvino's L'avventura di due sposi and directed by Mario Monicelli (1962), Arpino worked on the screenplay alongside Calvino, Susi Cecchi D'Amico and Mario Monicelli.
- His Il buio e il miele was turned into the well-known and multiple prize-winning film Profumo di donna (1974), directed by Dino Risi with Vittorio Gassman as Captain Fausto Consolo and Agostina Belli as Sara. This film in turn was remade in 1992 as Scent of a Woman (1992).
- In 1977 Dino Risi's film Anima persa, with Vittorio Gassman as Fabio Stolz and Catherine Deneuve as Sofia Stolz, was freely adapted from Arpino's novel of the same name.
- In a 1991 documentary for the French television series Un livre un jour Arpino appeared as himself.
