= The Eight Mountains (novel) =

2016 novel by Paolo Cognetti

- Title page in original Italian language, Le otto montagne (2016)
- Author: Paolo Cognetti
- Original title: Le otto montagne
- Translator: Simon Carnell; Erica Segre
- Language: Italian
- Publisher: Einaudi
- Publication date: 2016
- Publication place: Italy
- English publication date: 2018
- Pages: 199
- ISBN: 9788806226725

The Eight Mountains (Italian: Le otto montagne) is a 2016 novel by the Italian writer Paolo Cognetti. It is about the friendship between a boy from Milan and a local boy in the Italian Alps, during childhood and as adults.

The book was a bestseller in Italy and received the Strega Prize in 2017. The Times wrote that it has similarities to My Father's Glory by Marcel Pagnol but is darker and more tragic. The Guardian wrote that the book's reflections sometimes are "on the brink of being overly mystical" but end up saved by "arrestingly simple language".

It was the basis for the 2022 film The Eight Mountains.
