= Michele Prisco =

Italian writer and journalist (1920–2003)

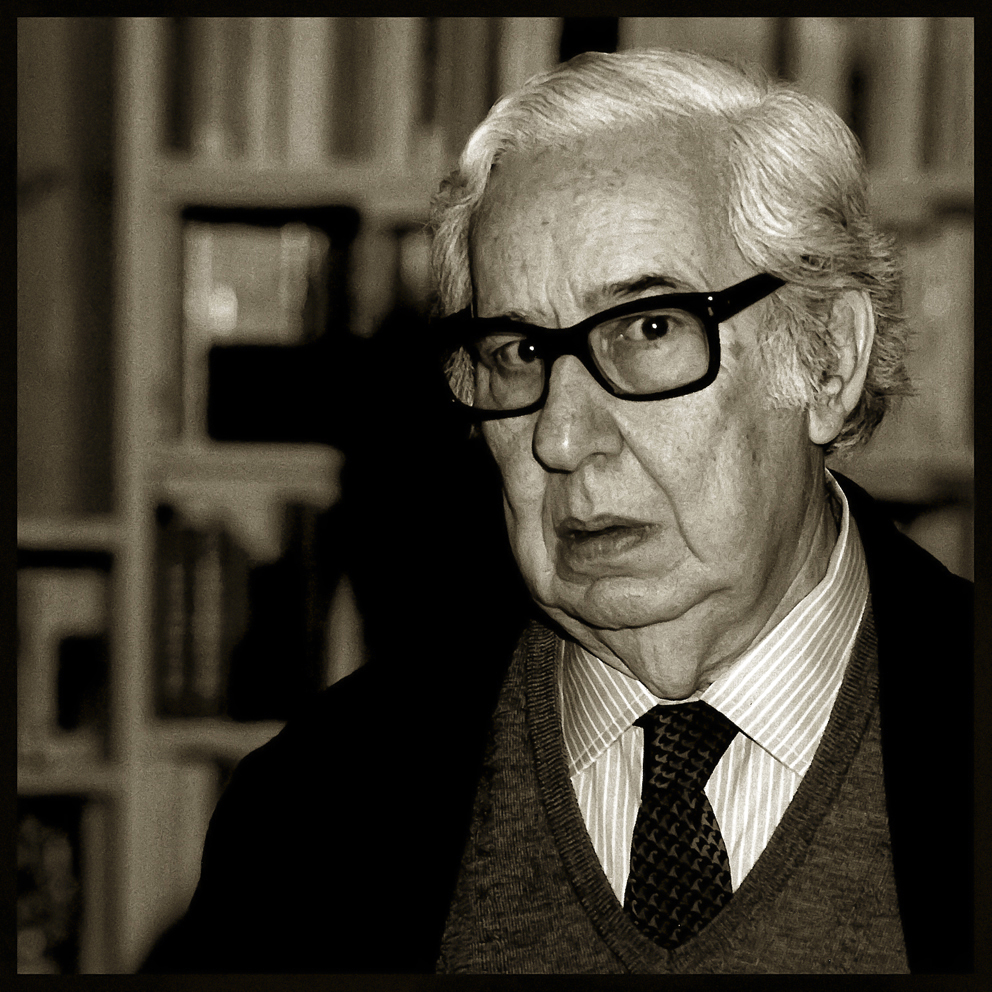
Michele Prisco photographed by Augusto De Luca

Michele Prisco (18 January 1920 – 19 November 2003) was an Italian journalist, critic, and novelist.

Prisco was born and educated in Torre Annunziata. His family provided the middle-class background central to many of his books. He studied law and took examinations to become a solicitor, but decided instead on a career as a writer.

In 1942, his first short story, "Gli alianti", was published in a monthly supplement to the newspaper Il Corriere della sera. Before being mobilised, he worked as a staff member on the Gazetta del Popolo de Turin, and during the long months at the front he continued to make contributions; several of his acquaintances from this time were to become lifelong friends. These included the writers Gino Montesanto and Mario Pomilio, and the painter Enrico Accatino.

In 1949 he published his first novel, La provincia addormentata, which won the Strega gold medal for the best newcomer. The following year, he won the Venezia Prize for an unpublished work, Gli eredi del vento. In 1951 he married and relocated to Naples, where he would live until his death. His early works, such as La provincia addormentata, Eredi del vento and Figli difficili, describe the Neapolitan middle class, with all its foibles and limitations, and in particular, its inability to find a way out of the social and economic stagnation that weighed on the city at this time. Prisco later explored other social strata, but studiously avoided the impressionistic and folkloric mannerisms that were typical of post-war writers of this region.

During the 1960s he collaborated with Mario Pomilio, Domenico Rea, Luigi Incoronato, Gianfranco Venè and Leone Pacini Savoj on the literary review Le ragioni narrative, which he would edit throughout his life. He continued to work as a journalist and film critic. He was the vice secretary of the National Writers' Union for a decade. The novel Una spirale di nebbia (1966, translated into English in 1969) won him the Strega Prize and was made into an acclaimed film. He died in 2003.

== Partial list of works ==
- La provincia addormentata, 1949
- Gli eredi del vento ("Heirs of the Wind"), 1950
- Figli difficili, 1954
- Fuochi a mare, 1957
- La dama di piazza, 1961 (Premio Napoli)
- Punto franco, 1965
- Una spirale di nebbia ("A Spiral of Mist"), 1966 (premio Strega)
- I cieli della sera, 1970 (premio Napoli)
- Gli ermellini neri, 1975
- Il colore del cristallo, 1977
- Le parole del silenzio, 1981 (premio Mediterraneo)
- Lo specchio cieco, 1984 (premio letterario Giovanni Verga, premio Hemingway, premio Fiuggi, una vita per la cultura)
- I giorni della conchiglia, 1982 (premio Sirmione Catullo, premio Rosone d’oro Pescara)
- Terre basse, 1992 (premio Sila, premio Il Pane - Castiglione del Lago, premio Boccaccio, premio Frontino - Montefeltro, premio Selezione - Penne)
- Il cuore della vita, 1995
- Il pellicano di pietra, 1996 (premio Fregene, premio Selezione Campiello, premio Viadana, premio Rhegium Julii, premio Gioi Cilento, premio Pirandello)
- Gli altri, 1999

== Bibliography ==
- Pompeo Giannantonio. Invito alla lettura di Michele Prisco. Volume 49 of Invito alla Lettura: Sezione italiana. Mursia, 1977.
- Aurelio Benevento. La narrativa di Michele Prisco. De Luca, 1972.
