= Strega Prize =

Most prestigious Italian literary award

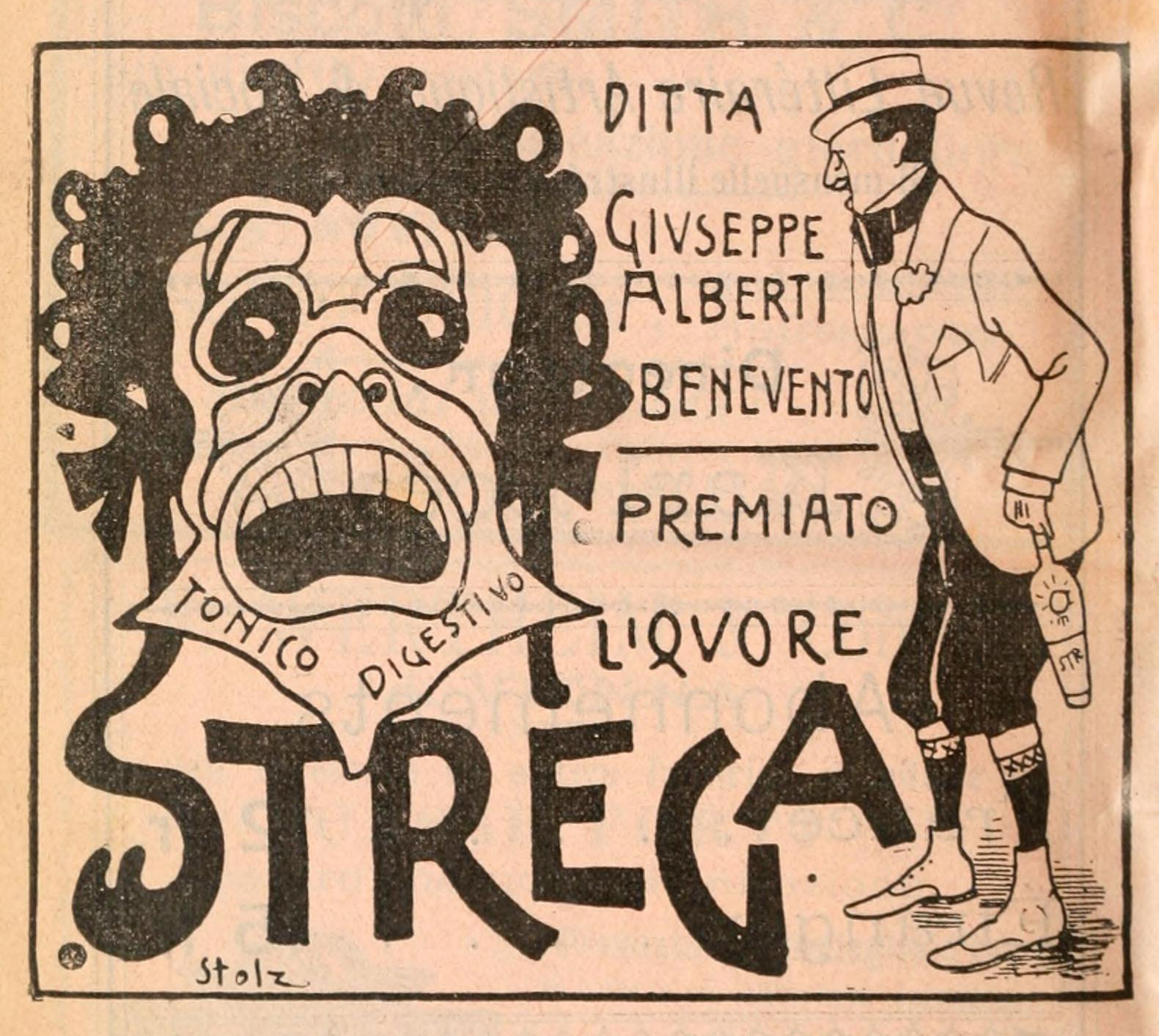
Strega liqueur advert (1902)

The Strega Prize (Italian: Premio Strega [ˈprɛːmjo ˈstreːɡa]) is the most important Italian literary award. It has been awarded annually since 1947 for the best work of prose fiction written in the Italian language by an author of any nationality and first published between 1 March of the previous year and 28/29 February.

== History ==
In 1944 Maria and Goffredo Bellonci started to host a literary salon at their home in Rome. These Sunday gatherings of writers, artists and intellectuals grew to include many of the most notable figures of Italian cultural life. The group became known as the Amici della Domenica, or Sunday Friends. In 1947 the Belloncis, together with Guido Alberti, owner of the firm which produces the Strega liqueur, decided to inaugurate a prize for fiction, the winner being chosen by the Sunday friends.

The activities of the Bellonci circle and the institution of the prize were seen as marking a tentative return to ‘normality’ in Italian cultural life: a feature of the reconstruction which followed the years of Fascism, war, occupation and liberation.

The first winner of the Strega, elected by the Sunday Friends, was Ennio Flaiano, for his first and only novel Tempo di uccidere, which is set in Africa during the Second Italo-Abyssinian War. It has been translated into English as A Time to Kill and The Short Cut.

Maria Bellonci published a history of the Strega prize, titled Come un racconto gli anni del premio Strega, in 1971.

== Selection process ==
Since the death of Maria Bellonci in 1986, the prize has been administered by the Fondazione Maria e Goffredo Bellonci. The members of the now 400-strong prize jury, drawn from Italy’s cultural elite, are still known as the Sunday Friends. For a book to be considered, it must have the support of at least two Friends. This initial long list is whittled down at a first ballot to a short list of five. The second round of voting, followed by the proclamation of the victor, takes place on the first Thursday in July in the nymphaeum of the Villa Giulia, Rome.

== Sponsorship ==
Liquore Strega sponsors the prize, awarding 5.000 euro to the victor.

== Premio Strega speciale, 2006 ==
In 2006, the sixtieth year of the Strega Prize, a special award was made to the Constitution of Italy, a document which was drawn up and approved in 1946, the year of the Strega’s inauguration. The award was received by former President of the Italian Republic Oscar Luigi Scalfaro.

== Winners ==
- 1947 – Ennio Flaiano, Tempo di uccidere
- 1948 – Vincenzo Cardarelli, Villa Tarantola
- 1949 – Giambattista Angioletti, La memoria
- 1950 – Cesare Pavese, La bella estate
- 1951 – Corrado Alvaro, Quasi una vita
- 1952 – Alberto Moravia, I racconti
- 1953 – Massimo Bontempelli, L'amante fedele
- 1954 – Mario Soldati, Lettere da Capri
- 1955 – Giovanni Comisso, Un gatto attraversa la strada
- 1956 – Giorgio Bassani, Cinque storie ferraresi
- 1957 – Elsa Morante, L'isola di Arturo
- 1958 – Dino Buzzati, Sessanta racconti
- 1959 – Giuseppe Tomasi di Lampedusa, Il gattopardo
- 1960 – Carlo Cassola, La ragazza di Bube
- 1961 – Raffaele La Capria, Ferito a morte
- 1962 – Mario Tobino, Il clandestino
- 1963 – Natalia Ginzburg, Lessico famigliare
- 1964 – Giovanni Arpino, L'ombra delle colline
- 1965 – Paolo Volponi, La macchina mondiale
- 1966 – Michele Prisco, Una spirale di nebbia
- 1967 – Anna Maria Ortese, Poveri e semplici
- 1968 – Alberto Bevilacqua, L'occhio del gatto
- 1969 – Lalla Romano, Le parole tra noi leggere
- 1970 – Guido Piovene, Le stelle fredde
- 1971 – Raffaello Brignetti, La spiaggia d'oro
- 1972 – Giuseppe Dessì, Paese d'ombre
- 1973 – Manlio Cancogni, Allegri, gioventù
- 1974 – Guglielmo Petroni, La morte del fiume
- 1975 – Tommaso Landolfi, A caso
- 1976 – Fausta Cialente, Le quattro ragazze Wieselberger
- 1977 – Fulvio Tomizza, La miglior vita
- 1978 – Ferdinando Camon, Un altare per la madre
- 1979 – Primo Levi, La chiave a stella
- 1980 – Vittorio Gorresio, La vita ingenua
- 1981 – Umberto Eco, Il nome della rosa
- 1982 – Goffredo Parise, Il sillabario n.2
- 1983 – Mario Pomilio, Il Natale del 1833
- 1984 – Pietro Citati, Tolstoj
- 1985 – Carlo Sgorlon, L'armata dei fiumi perduti
- 1986 – Maria Bellonci, Rinascimento privato
- 1987 – Stanislao Nievo, Le isole del paradiso
- 1988 – Gesualdo Bufalino, Le menzogne della notte
- 1989 – Giuseppe Pontiggia, La grande sera
- 1990 – Sebastiano Vassalli, La chimera
- 1991 – Paolo Volponi, La strada per Roma
- 1992 – Vincenzo Consolo, Nottetempo, casa per casa
- 1993 – Domenico Rea, Ninfa plebea
- 1994 – Giorgio Montefoschi, La casa del padre
- 1995 – Mariateresa Di Lascia, Passaggio in ombra
- 1996 – Alessandro Barbero, Bella vita e guerre altrui di Mr. Pyle, 'gentiluomo'
- 1997 – Claudio Magris, Microcosmi
- 1998 – Enzo Siciliano, I bei momenti
- 1999 – Dacia Maraini, Buio
- 2000 – Ernesto Ferrero, N.
- 2001 – Domenico Starnone, Via Gemito
- 2002 – Margaret Mazzantini, Non ti muovere
- 2003 – Melania Mazzucco, Vita
- 2004 – Ugo Riccarelli, Il dolore perfetto
- 2005 – Maurizio Maggiani, Il viaggiatore notturno
- 2006 – Sandro Veronesi, Caos calmo
- 2007 – Niccolò Ammaniti, Come Dio comanda
- 2008 – Paolo Giordano, La solitudine dei numeri primi
- 2009 – Tiziano Scarpa, Stabat Mater
- 2010 – Antonio Pennacchi, Canale Mussolini
- 2011 – Edoardo Nesi, Storia della mia gente
- 2012 – Alessandro Piperno, Inseparabili
- 2013 – Walter Siti, Resistere non serve a niente
- 2014 – Francesco Piccolo, Il desiderio di essere come tutti
- 2015 – Nicola Lagioia, La Ferocia
- 2016 – Edoardo Albinati, La scuola cattolica
- 2017 – Paolo Cognetti, Le otto montagne
- 2018 – Helena Janeczek, La ragazza con la Leica
- 2019 – Antonio Scurati, M. Il figlio del secolo
- 2020 – Sandro Veronesi, Il colibrì
- 2021 – Emanuele Trevi, Due vite
- 2022 – Mario Desiati, Spatriati
- 2023 – Ada D'Adamo, Come d'aria
- 2024 – Donatella Di Pietrantonio, L'età fragile
- 2025 – Andrea Bajani, L'anniversario
- 2026 - Michele Mari, I convitati di pietra
