= The Via Veneto Papers =

1973 memoir by Ennio Flaiano

- First edition (Italian 1973)
- Author: Ennio Flaiano
- Original title: La solitudine del satiro
- Translator: John Satriano
- Language: Italian
- Genre: Diary, Memories, Interview
- Publisher: The Marlboro Press
- Publication date: 1973 & 1989
- Publication place: Italy
- English publication date: 1992
- Media type: Print (Hardback & Paperback)
- Pages: 251 pp
- ISBN: 0-910395-67-5 (and 0910395667 clothbound ed.)
- OCLC: 27103684
- Dewey Decimal: 858/.91403 20
- LC Class: PQ4815.L23 S613 1992
- Preceded by: Le ombre bianche (1972)
- Followed by: Autobiografia del blu di Prussia (posthumous, 1974)

The Via Veneto Papers is a memoir collection by Ennio Flaiano, originally published in Italian in 1973, with a new expanded edition by Rizzoli in 1989 and translated into English by John Satriano in 1992.

== Synopsis & Narrative Style ==
Wrote critic Richard Eder in Newsday:

To read the late Ennio Flaiano is to imagine a bust of Ovid or Martial, placed in a piazza in Rome and smiling above a traffic jam. In his antic, melancholy irony, Flaiano wrote as if he were time itself, satirizing the present moment.

This is the first English language edition of the Italian original La solitudine del satiro (lit. The Satyr’s Solitude) published in 1973, a year after Flaiano's death.

The book is divided into three sections:

- The first, The Via Veneto Papers, is an evocation of the Rome of La Dolce Vita, of the early stages in the writing and the realising of the film itself, and, through a series of brilliant little sketches, a commemoration of the aging Italian poet Vincenzo Cardarelli, skeptical survivor from an earlier time, representative of an altogether different life.
- Occasional Notebooks comprises the second and longest section: satirical commentaries and diary jottings on diverse subjects: film, art, literature, world politics, Italy and the Italians, contemporary culture, travel.
- The concluding section is an interview given by Flaiano shortly before his death: entitled Concerning Satire, Boredom, Faith, it's a kind of spiritual testament of one of Italy's most brilliant modern writers.

== Excerpt ==
Incipit:

These notes were written at various moments and are not here in chronological order. What I wanted to recollect is a street, a film, and old poet: disparate things that are unclearly mixed up with one another, not only in memory, but also in a diary. The jumps from one time to another have, then, a reason of their own.

June 1958 -- "I am working with Fellini and Tullio Pinelli, dusting off an old idea of ours for a film, the one about a young provincial who comes to Rome to become a journalist. Fellini wants to adapt the idea to the present day, to paint a picture of this “wog society” that frolics between eroticism, alienation, boredom and sudden affluence. It is a society which, the terrors of the cold war now past and perhaps even in reaction to them, flourishes a bit everywhere. But in Rome, through a mixing together of the sacred and the profane, of the old and the new, through the en masse arrival of foreigners, through the cinema, presents more aggressive, subtropical qualities. The film will have La dolce Vita as its title and we have yet to write a single line of it; we are vaguely taking notes and going to the different places around town to refresh our memories."
--The Via Veneto Papers, p.1.

=== Quote ===
- …Indeed this reminds me of an aphorism of Malraux’s: "In every intelligent minority there is a majority of imbeciles."
