= Stanislao Nievo =

Italian writer, journalist and director (1928–2006)

Stanislao Nievo (born 30 June 1928 in Milan, died in 2006 in Roma) was an Italian writer, journalist and director. He won the Strega Prize. He was the great grandson of Ippolito Nievo, author of Le confessioni di un italiano.

== Filmography ==
- Africa Addio, 1966
- Mal d'Africa, 1968
- Sette donne a testa, 1972

== Works ==
- Novels : Il prato in fondo al mare (Campiello Prize in 1975), Aurora (Mondadori, 1979), Il palazzo del silenzio (Mondadori, 1987), Le isole del Paradiso (Strega Prize in 1987), La balena azzurra (Mondadori, 1990), Il sorriso degli dei (Marsilio, 1997), Aldilà (Marsilio, 1999), Gli ultimi cavalieri dell'Apocalisse (in collaboration with E. Pennetta, Marsilio, 2004)
- Stories : Il padrone della notte (Mondadori, 1976), Il cavallo nero (Stampatori, 1979), Il tempo del sogno (Mondadori, 1993), Tre racconti (Italica, 1999)
- Poems : Viaggio verde (Mondadori, 1976), Canto di pietra (Mondadori, 1989), Barca solare (Rubbettino, 2001)

== Journalism ==
- Il Giornale d'Italia, 1954–1962
- Il Piccolo, 1959–1964
- La Repubblica, 1976
- La Stampa, 1978
- Il Gazzettino
