= Ennio Flaiano =

Italian writer (1910–1972)

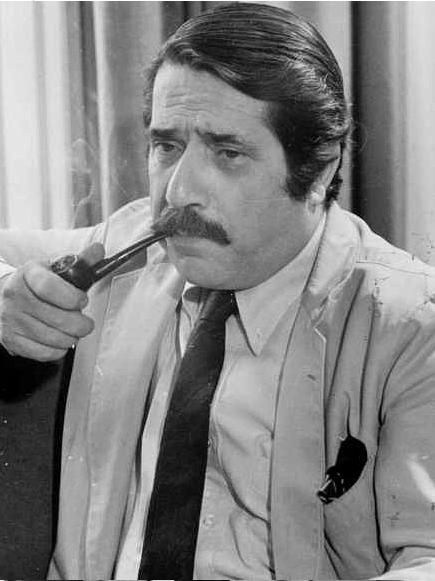
- Born: 5 March 1910; Pescara, Kingdom of Italy
- Died: 20 November 1972 (aged 62); Rome, Italy
- Occupations: Writer, screenwriter, journalist
- Spouse: Rosetta Rota
- Children: Lelè (Luisa)
- Writing career
- Genres: Scripts, diary, fiction
- Literary movement: Neorealism, modern humorism

Ennio Flaiano (5 March 1910 – 20 November 1972) was an Italian screenwriter, playwright, novelist, journalist, and drama critic. Best known for his work with Federico Fellini, Flaiano co-wrote ten screenplays with the Italian director, including La Strada (1954), La Dolce Vita (1960), and 8½ (1963). He received the inaugural 1947 Strega Prize for his novel A Time to Kill.

== Life and career ==
Flaiano was born in Pescara. He wrote for Cineillustrato, Oggi, Il Mondo, Il Corriere della Sera, Omnibus, and other prominent Italian newspapers and magazines. In 1947, he won the Strega Prize for his novel Tempo di uccidere (variously translated as Miriam, A Time to Kill, and The Short Cut). Set in the Italian Eritrea during the Italian invasion of Ethiopia that started the Second Italo-Ethiopian War (1935–1936), the novel tells the story of an Italian officer who rapes and subsequently kills an Eritrean woman and is then tormented by the memory of his act. The barren landscape around the protagonist hints at an interior emptiness and meaninglessness. This is one of a growing number of Italian literary works facing up to the misdeeds of Italian colonialism in Eastern Africa. The novel has been continuously in print for sixty years. A movie adaptation with the same title, directed by Giuliano Montaldo and starring Nicolas Cage, was released in 1989.

In 1971, Flaiano suffered a first heart attack, and wrote in his notes: "All will have to change." He put his many papers in order and published them, although the major part of his memoirs were published posthumously. In November 1972, he began writing various autobiographical pieces for Corriere della Sera. On 20 November 1972, while at a clinic for a check-up, he suffered a second cardiac arrest and died. His daughter Lelè, after a long illness, died at age 40 in 1992. His wife Rosetta Rota, a mathematician and the aunt of mathematician Gian-Carlo Rota, died in 2003. The entire family is buried together at the Maccarese Cemetery, near Rome.

== Flaiano and Rome ==
Flaiano's name is indissolubly tied to Rome, a city he loved and hated, as he was a caustic witness to its urban evolutions and debacles, its vices and its virtues. In La Solitudine del Satiro, Flaiano left numerous passages relating to his Rome. In the Montesacro quarter of Rome, the LABit theatre company placed a commemorative plaque on the facade of the house where he lived from 1952. Critic Richard Eder wrote in Newsday: "To read the late Ennio Flaiano is to imagine a bust of Ovid or Martial, placed in a piazza in Rome and smiling above a traffic jam. In his antic, melancholy irony, Flaiano wrote as if he were time itself, satirizing the present moment."

== Literary style ==
A fine and ironic moralist, at once tragic and bitter, Flaiano produced narrative works and other prose writings permeated by an original satiric vein and by a vivid sense of the grotesque through which he stigmatised the paradoxical aspects of contemporary reality. He introduced the expression saltare sul carro del vincitore ("to jump on the winner's chariot") into the Italian language.

In the last section of his book, The Via Veneto Papers, journalist Giulio Villa Santa included an interview with Flaiano for Swiss-Italian Radio, two weeks before his death. The interview concluded as follows:

Villa Santa: This evening it seems to me, Flaiano, that you have opened yourself up as perhaps you have never done before, that you have revealed an anguish and above all a faith behind your humour. But this gives rise to the suspicion in me that at bottom you are a man from another period if not from another age altogether; is that an unfounded suspicion?

Flaiano: It's a legitimate one. We don’t know who we are, we are just so many passengers without baggage, we are born alone and we die alone. A writer once quoted me in a book of hers, and in the English translation the English writer translated my name as Ennius Flaianus, thinking that this Ennio Flaiano was some Latin author. A few months later we met each other in a restaurant in Rome and were introduced and, naturally, she experienced an awkward moment, for she didn’t think that this ancient writer was still alive. However, we did agree that certain characteristics of my person, a certain style of life, indicated that she was right. I perhaps was not of this age, am not of this age. Perhaps I belong to another world: I feel myself more in harmony when I read Juvenal, Martial, Catullus. It's probable that I’m an ancient Roman who is still here, forgotten by history, to write about the things that the others wrote about far better than I – namely, let me repeat, Catullus, Martial, Juvenal. (p. 251)

== Flaiano Prize ==
In 1975, the Flaiano Prize was created in his honour. Recognizing achievement in cinema, theatre, creative writing, and literary criticism, the international prize is awarded annually in Flaiano's hometown of Pescara.

== Quotations ==
Flaiano was known for his quotations, including "Chastity is the mirage of obscene people", "I got so upset I couldn't sleep the whole afternoon", "If the peoples knew each other better, they would hate each other more", "In thirty years time Italy won't be like its governments intended, but as its TV dictated", "Remorse used to come afterwards in my love stories; now it goes before me", "Italians are always ready to run to the rescue of the winners", and "Italy is the country where the shortest line between two points is an arabesque." Perhaps his most well-known quotation is often misattributed to both Winston Churchill and Flaiano himself. Flaiano wrote: "In Italy, fascists divide themselves into two categories: fascists and antifascists." The real author of this quotation was Mino Maccari, and Flaiano himself was in fact attributing it to him.

== Works ==
- La guerra spiegata ai poveri (1946)
- Tempo di uccidere (1947)
  - The Short Cut (The Marlboro Press, 1994 new ed.)
- Diario notturno (1956)
- La donna nell'armadio (1958)
- Una e una notte (1959)
- Il gioco e il massacro (1970)
- Un marziano a Roma (1971)
- Le ombre bianche (1972)
- La solitudine del satiro (posthumous, 1973)
  - The Via Veneto Papers (The Marlboro Press, 1992)
- Autobiografia del blu di Prussia (posthumous, 1974)
- Diario degli errori (1977)

== Filmography ==
Flaiano was a successful screenwriter and collaborated on several notable films, including Rome, Open City (1946), Cops and Robbers (1951), The Woman of Rome (1954), Too Bad She's Bad (1955), La notte (1961), Ghosts of Rome (1961), The 10th Victim (1965), La cagna (1972). With Tullio Pinelli, he co-wrote the screenplays for ten films by Federico Fellini: Variety Lights (1950), The White Sheik (1952), I vitelloni (1953), La strada (1954), Il bidone (1955), Nights of Cabiria (1957), La Dolce Vita (1960), The Temptations of Doctor Antonio episode in Boccaccio '70 (1962), 8½ (1963), Rapture (1965) and Juliet of the Spirits (1965).
