= Tommaso Landolfi =

Italian author and translator (1908–1979)

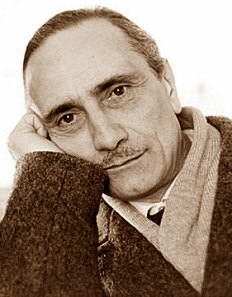
- Born: 1908; Pico
- Died: 1979 (aged 70–71); Rome
- Occupation: Writer

Tommaso Landolfi (9 August 1908 – 8 July 1979) was an Italian writer, translator and literary critic. His numerous grotesque tales and novels, sometimes on the border of speculative fiction, science fiction and realism, place him in a unique and unorthodox position among Italian writers. He won a number of awards, including the prestigious Strega Prize.

== Life ==
He was born in Pico, now in the province of Frosinone (then in province of Terra di Lavoro, the roughly modern-day province of Caserta), to a noble family. In 1932, he graduated in Russian language and literature at the University of Florence. During his time in Florence, he worked on various magazines including Letteratura and Campo di Marte. He later worked on other magazines and newspapers including Oggi, Il Mondo and Corriere della Sera.

He focused his translation efforts on Russian and German authors such as Fyodor Dostoevsky, Aleksandr Pushkin, Nikolai Gogol and Hugo von Hofmannsthal.

He spent much of his life in Rome and at the family home at Pico, as well as the gaming houses of Sanremo and Venice, where he was an avid gambler. He died in Rome.

He was an atheist.

== Writings ==
Landolfi is a writer of rare stylistic power. His originality lies principally in his ability to incorporate his wide knowledge of European literature into his Italian inheritance, with a poet's (and translator's) close concern with language. His work reveals the clear influence of writers such as Edgar Allan Poe and Gogol. Susan Sontag saw him as something of a cross between Borges and Isak Dinesen, but thought him probably better than either. Landolfi constantly strives to enrich his own style, drawing on obscure or even archaic formulations and at times creating his own languages. In an almost Pirandellian fashion, Landolfi is constantly haunted by the unresolved conflict between art and life.

He wrote a number of short stories and novels, poetry and theatrical pieces, the early work being in general the most significant, particularly the works of his so-called 'youthful maturity', the collection of short stories Dialogo dei massimi sistemi (1937).

La pietra lunare (1939), his first novel, opens on a grotesque and almost hallucinatory scene of 'provincial life' from which the main character, Giovancarlo, is possessed by Gurù, the goat-girl, who allures him through a realm of phantasmagorical horror into the bowels of the earth and an erotic initiation. The world seems divided between two opposing realities, between the misery of everyday life and another strange and marvellous world.

Racconto d'autunno (1947) is his best-known work outside Italy. Its story is, in more ways than one, a metaphor for an end to the old and the beginning of the new. While ghosts, terror and war dominate the landscape, and a gothic horror story is the main plot, there is nonetheless a sense that this book is a lamentation on an epoch that came to a violent end during World War II.

Cancroregina (1950) is a strange science-fiction story, in the form of a diary written by a man who is stuck in orbit in outer space and cannot return to Earth.

A caso, a collection of short stories, won him the Strega Prize in 1975.

In 1996 his daughter Idolina founded the Centro Studi Landolfiani.

== Selected works ==
- Dialogo dei massimi sistemi (1937)
- La pietra lunare (1939)
- II mar delle blatte e altre storie (1939)
- Racconto d'autunno, trans. Joachim Neugroschel (An Autumn Story, Eridanos Press, 1989)
- Cancroregina, trans. Raymond Rosenthal (Cancerqueen The Dial Press, 1971)
- Le due zittelle (1952)
- La bière du pêcheur (1953)
- Ombre (1954)
- Rien va (1963)
- Mano rubata (1964)
- Des mois (1967)
- A caso (1975)

There have been three collections of his short stories in English translation: Gogol’s Wife and Other Stories, trans. Raymond Rosenthal et al. (New Directions, 1963); Cancerqueen and Other Stories, trans. Raymond Rosenthal (Dial Press, 1971); and Words in Commotion and Other Stories, Intro. Italo Calvino, trans. Kathrine Jason (Viking, 1986).

The majority of his work is in print, published by Adelphi under the editorship of Landolfi's daughter.
