= A Time to Kill (Flaiano novel) =

1947 novel by Ennio Flaiano

- Title page in original Italian language edition Tempo di uccidere (1980 edition)
- Author: Ennio Flaiano
- Original title: Tempo di uccidere
- Language: Italian
- Publisher: Longanesi
- Publication date: 1947
- Publication place: Italy
- English publication date: 1950
- Pages: 385

A Time to Kill (Italian: Tempo di uccidere), published in the United States as The Short Cut, is a 1947 novel by the Italian writer Ennio Flaiano. It is about an Italian lieutenant during the Second Italo-Ethiopian War who tells how he accidentally killed an Ethiopian girl while on leave and struggles with guilt.

The book received the Strega Prize. It was adapted into the 1989 film Time to Kill directed by Giuliano Montaldo.
