= Emanuele Trevi =

Italian writer and critic (born 1964)

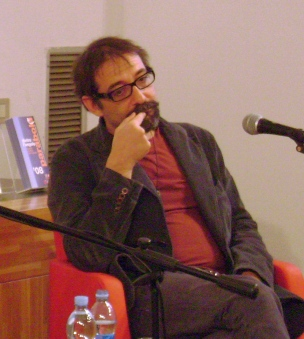
Emanuele Trevi

Emanuele Trevi (born 1964) is an Italian writer and critic. He was born in Rome, the son of Mario Trevi, a Jungian psychoanalyst.

Trevi has written numerous critical essays on literary figures. His work on the Italian poet Pietro Tripodo won the Sandro Onofri Prize. He also edited an anthology with the writer Marco Lodoli. His book Qualcosa di scritto (Something Written) won the EU Prize for Literature in 2012. In 2021, his book Due vite won the prestigious Strega Prize.

Trevi has also worked in publishing and radio. He is a frequent contributor to national newspapers and magazines.
