= An Autumn Story (novel) =

1947 novel by Tommaso Landolfi

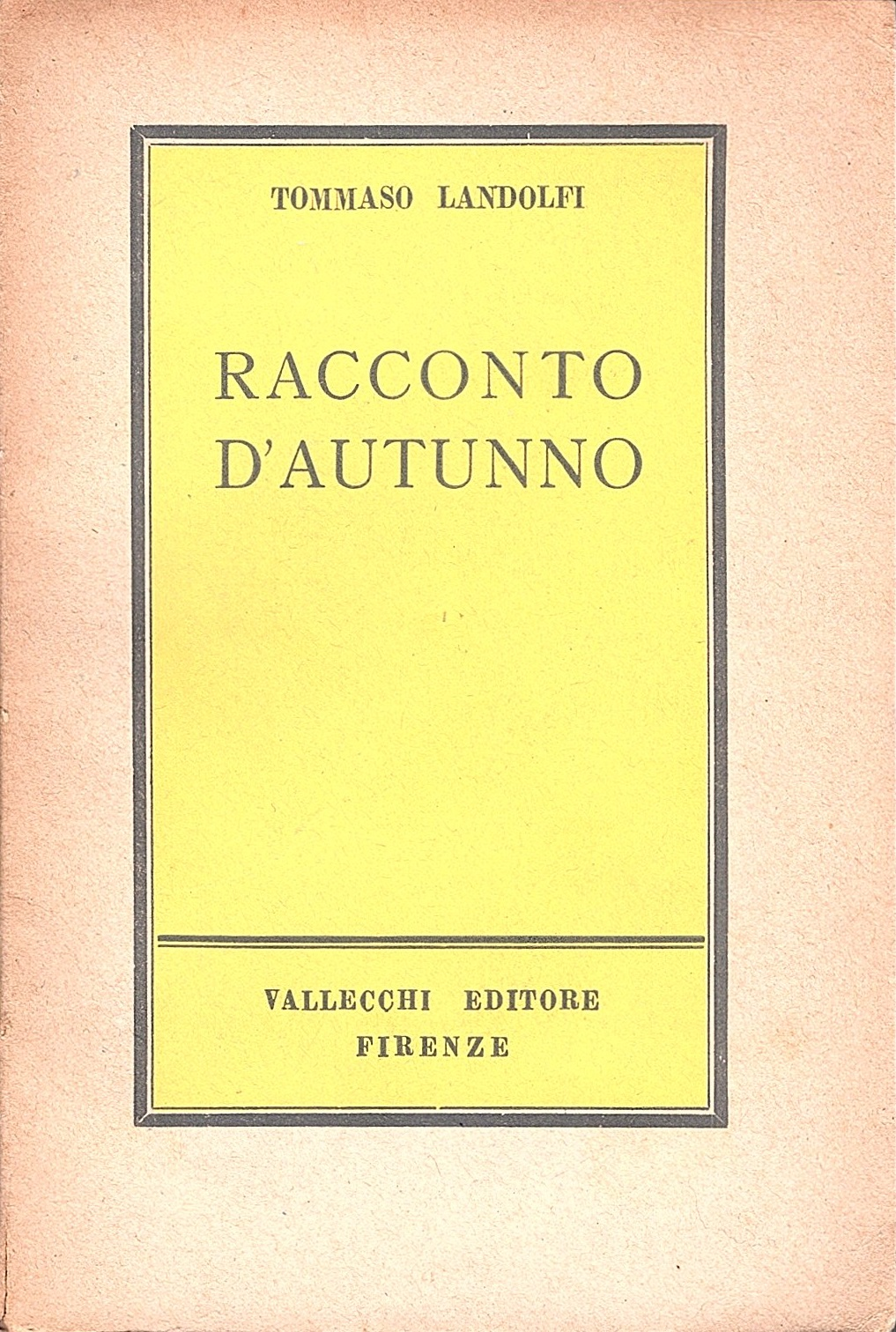
- Author: Tommaso Landolfi
- Original title: Racconto d'autunno
- Translator: Joachim Neugroschel
- Language: Italian
- Genre: gothic fiction
- Publisher: Vallecchi
- Publication date: 1947
- Publication place: Italy
- English publication date: 1989
- Pages: 182

An Autumn Story (Italian: Racconto d'autunno) is a 1947 novel by the Italian writer Tommaso Landolfi. It is a gothic novel about a man who stays at a mysterious, largely empty mansion with a secret.

== Plot ==
Although it is clear the story is set during the German occupation of Italy toward the end of World War II, the mood and environments are made to suggest timelessness. The main character is a nameless fugitive who comes across a mansion on a mountain where the only occupant, an old and evasive nobleman, reluctantly allows him to stay the night. He is drawn to the mysteries of the house, which contains labyrinthine rooms and corridors, emits strange human sounds and has a painting of a woman over the fireplace, and ends up prolonging his stay.

Sensing someone's presence, he searches the house and discovers a woman, Lucia, who wears the same old-fashioned clothes as the woman on the painting. He spies on the nobleman and catches him performing a ritual that makes his dead wife rise from the fireplace. As the protagonist screams in terror, the woman disappears and the nobleman suffers a stroke which kills him.

The protagonist escapes but returns a few days later and is greeted by Lucia, who explains she is the daughter of the woman in the painting and the nobleman, who has kept her hidden in the house her entire life and treated her as a wife. The protagonist and Lucia fall in love but their happiness ends abruptly when an army invades and soldiers rape and kill Lucia in front of the man. The man withdraws to the mansion, obsessing over his dead partner.

== Reception ==
The novel has been interpreted as a resistance story that explores and questions the concept of liberation. It addressess an Italian war trauma by incorporating the at the time unacknowledged mass rape and murder by Allied soldiers following the battle of Monte Cassino.

Alexander Stille of the Los Angeles Times wrote that the gothic genre, language and setting are reminiscent of the works of Nikolai Gogol and Edgar Allan Poe, with clear parallels to Poe's "The Fall of the House of Usher". He wrote that An Autumn Story is best before it "degenerates" into melodrama, although the use of the genre is self-conscious and explores a "belief in the hypnotic power of language", showing Landolfi as "an archaic modernist" with "esoteric purposes".

Publishers Weekly described the book as surprising, riveting and engaging for the senses and wrote that it contains "piercingly nightmarish imagery".

Alan Ryan of The Washington Post stressed the similarities to Poe and called Joachim Neugroschel's English translation "gorgeous", writing that the book's language conveys both eeriness and a longing for a simpler past. Ryan wrote that beyond possible political implications, the novel fascinates by being "familiar but really like nothing else, indifferent to time and fashion, intensely obsessive".

== Adaptation ==
The novel is the basis for the television film Racconto d'autunno, directed by Domenico Campana and starring Stefano Patrizi. It was broadcast on RAI in February 1981 to a viewership of over eleven million.
