= Tiziano Scarpa =

Italian novelist, playwright and poet (born 1963)

Tiziano Scarpa (born 16 May 1963) is an Italian novelist, playwright and poet.

Born in Venice, he won the 2009 Strega Prize for his novel, Stabat mater.

== Selected works ==
- Venice is a fish (2003)
- Stabat mater (2009)
