= T. Raja =

T. Raja may refer to:

- T. Raja (social worker), Indian humanitarian and social worker
- T. Raja (judge), Indian judge

== See also ==
- Raja (name)
