= Auto Raja =

Auto Raja may refer to:

- Auto Raja (1980 film)
- Auto Raja (1982 film)
- Auto Raja (2013 film)
- T. Raja (social worker), an Indian humanitarian popularly known as Auto Raja
