= Margot Wölk =

German secretary, Adolf Hitler's personal food taster

Margot Wölk (sometimes Woelk; 27 December 1917 – 2014) was a German secretary who claimed that she was among 15 young women who, in 1942, were selected to taste German leader Adolf Hitler's food at the Wolf's Lair in East Prussia for two-and-a-half years to confirm that it was safe. According to Wölk, she was the only one of the 15 to survive World War II, and her background as Hitler's food taster was not revealed until a newspaper interview on her 95th birthday in December 2012.

== Early life ==
Wölk was born in Wilmersdorf, the inner city locality of Berlin, in 1917. As a young woman Wölk said she had refused to join the League of German Girls (Bund Deutscher Mädel or BDM), the girl's segment of the Hitler Youth, and her father had been condemned for refusing to join the Nazi Party.

Wölk received her education at the Goethe-Lyzeum and later trained as secretary. As a secretary she was employed by the Reichversicherungsanstalt für Angestellte (RfA), who were responsible for the payment of pensions to retired workers.

While working there she met Karl Wölk and they were married in 1939.

Wölk continued working as a secretary during the beginning of the war, but left her parents' bombed-out Berlin apartment in the winter of 1941, to relocate to her mother-in-law's home in the East Prussian village of Gross-Partsch, now Parcz, Poland. According to Wölk, allied bombs had damaged her Berlin apartment, which stood in knee-deep water. Her husband Karl was at war, though having heard nothing from him in two years, she had long since assumed he was dead. In Gross-Partsch, she stayed with his parents in a house with a large garden. Less than three kilometers away was the Wolfsschanze (Wolf's Lair), German leader Adolf Hitler's first Eastern Front military headquarters in World War II. The complex, which would become one of several Führerhauptquartiere (Führer Headquarters) located in various parts of occupied Europe, was built for the start of Operation Barbarossa - the invasion of the Soviet Union - in 1941.

== Hitler's food taster ==
After Wölk's arrival in Gross-Partsch, she and 14 other young women were selected by the local mayor and brought to the barracks in nearby Krausendorf (now Kruszewiec, Warmian-Masurian Voivodeship, Poland), where cooks prepared food for the Wolf's Lair in a two-story building. Wölk was picked up by a bus daily from her mother-in-law's residence. The tasting took place daily from 11 to 12 o'clock. The service personnel filled platters with vegetables, sauces, noodle dishes and exotic fruits, placing them in a room with a large wooden table, where the food had to be tasted. "There was never meat because Hitler was a vegetarian," Wölk said in an interview. "The food was good ... very good. But we couldn't enjoy it." There were rumors of Allied plans to poison Hitler. After the women confirmed that the food was safe, members of the SS brought it to the main headquarters in crates.

After Colonel Claus von Stauffenberg's failed 20 July plot in 1944 in the Wolf's Lair to assassinate Adolf Hitler and remove the Nazi Party from power, the security around the Wolf's Lair was tightened, and the food tasters were no longer allowed to stay at home. Instead, they were boarded in a vacant school building nearby. Each morning at 8 AM, Wölk was roused by the SS, who shouted "Margot, get up!" from beneath her window. By that time, she was only needed if Hitler was actually at the Wolf's Lair, though she says that she never actually saw him. She saw Hitler's German shepherd almost daily: "It often played on the open area in front of our office-shack." Later in 1944, when the Soviet Red Army was just a few kilometers away from reaching the Wolf's Lair, a lieutenant took Wölk aside and put her on a train to Berlin. After the war ended, Wölk met the lieutenant again, and he told her that all of the other 14 food tasters had been killed by Soviet soldiers.

== Aftermath ==
As Wölk returned to Berlin, she fell into the hands of the Soviet Army after the end of the Battle of Berlin. For two weeks, they raped her repeatedly, inflicting such injuries that she was never able to bear children. In 1946, she was reunited with her husband Karl; he was marked by years of war and imprisonment, but the married couple lived happily together until his death in 1980.

For decades after the war, Wölk never talked about what happened in Gross-Partsch; however, the experience came to her often in dreams. It was not until December 2012, on her 95th birthday, when a local Berlin journalist from the newspaper Berliner Zeitung paid her a visit and began asking questions, that she spoke about what she calls the worst years of her life. It was then, she suddenly decided to break her silence. Wölk died in 2014.

Historians have however expressed skepticism of Wölks story; such as Sven Felix Kellerhof who after a documentary about Margot Wölk was aired in 2014, noted that Hitler had stomach problems in his last years and was given special diet food - prepared in a separate kitchen in the innermost security area of the Wolf's Lair, the "Sperrkreis 1." It would therefore would have made little practical sense to transport the food outside of this area. to barracks in Krausendorf (as described by Wölk) which were located a few kilometers from the Wolf's Lair.

There in fact are no known eye-witness accounts or documents (despite Hitlers other staff being well-documented) proving the existence of a group of women whose sole function was to act as food tasters for Hitler. There are however accounts of Hitler's food being tasted, but by members of his entourage, his personal physician and SS-men.

Historian Felix Bohr has said that during his research into the structures of the Wolf's Lair, he "found no sources that confirm Margot Wölk's story," but neither did he find documents that prove otherwise."

== In popular culture ==
Two novels, At the Wolf's Table by Rosella Postorino and The Taster by V.S. Alexander, are based on Wölk's experiences. This novel is inspired by her life, but not all that it mentions is reality; the writer decided to start the book by positioning the main character at Hitler's suicide.

Hitler’s Tasters, a play by Michelle Kholos Brooks, is based on these women.
