= Piperno (surname) =

Piperno is an Italian surname. Notable people with the surname include:

- Alessandro Piperno (born 1972), Italian writer and literary critic of Jewish descent
- Dolores Piperno, American archaeologist specializing in archaeobotany
- Franco Piperno (1943–2025), Italian physicist and political activist
- Reginald of Piperno, or Reginald of Priverno (ca 1230-ca 1290), Italian Dominican, theologian and companion of St. Thomas Aquinas
