= Saif ur Rehman Raja =

Pakistani-Italian educator and author (born 1994)

- سیف الرحمان راجہ
- Born: 4 January 1994 (age 32); Rawalpindi, Punjab, Pakistan
- Citizenship: Pakistan; Italy
- Alma mater: University of Bologna (BS, 2021); University of Siena (PhD, 2025)
- Occupations: Educator; writer
- Writing career
- Language: Italian
- Years active: 2018–present
- Notable work: Hijra (2024)
- Notable awards: UAAR Graduation Award (2021); TIR Award for Prose (2025)

Saif ur Rehman Raja (Italian: [ˌsɛf ˈraːdʒa]; Urdu: سیف الرحمان راجہ [ˌsɛːfʊrːɛɦˈmaːn ˈraːdʒaː]; born 4 January 1994) is a Pakistani-Italian educator and author, known for his 2024 debut novel Hijra.

== Early life ==
Saif ur Rehman Raja was born in 1994 into a Pakistani Muslim family in the city of Rawalpindi, the oldest of three brothers. His given name (lit. 'sword of Allah') was chosen by his paternal grandfather, Farmaan, who wanted to celebrate the birth of his first grandson from one of his sons. At the time of Raja's birth, his father Shabbir was working in Italy, and he and his brothers were raised by their mother Shakeela. In 2003, suffering a heart condition, she relocated to Italy with most of the family, but, due to his father's low income, Raja was forced to stay with his maternal grandparents in Pakistan. In 2005, at the age of 11, he was ultimately able to join them in Belluno, Northeast Italy. Over the years, he regularly spent his vacations with his grandmother Sakina in Rawalpindi.

During his teenage years, Raja came out as gay to his mother, finding difficult acceptance in spite of her affection, and later to the rest of the family, with his father's violently rejecting his sexuality. He attended liceo delle scienze umane after failing his first year of liceo scientifico, where his father had enrolled him.

== Academic career ==
In 2021, Raja graduated in Education Sciences at the University of Bologna with a thesis on infidelity and jealousy in monogamy and ethical non-monogamy, which was awarded a prize by the Union of Rationalist Atheists and Agnostics (UAAR). He subsequently pursued a PhD at the University of Siena, graduating in December 2025.

As an education researcher, his main fields of interest are multiculturalism, critical race theory, postcolonial theory, whiteness studies, critical pedagogy and intersectionality. He is active on social media and podcasts. In one of them – recorded with Cristina Ali Farah, Giulia Caminito, Sabrina Efionayi, Paolo Giordano, Djarah Kan and Nadeesha Uyangoda – Raja has discussed the figure of American civil rights activist James Baldwin, to whose life experience as a gay brown man he has compared his own.

== Literary career ==
In 2023, Raja was a finalist in the 2023 edition of the Italo Calvino Prize, in the short story category. In April 2024, Fandango Libri published his autobiographical novel Hijra, which in 2022 received a special mention at the Calvino Prize for unpublished authors and in 2025 won the prose section of the TIR Award, assigned by the literary magazine The Italian Review. The book has enjoyed wide critical acclaim in Italy and has been translated into Slovene.

In Hijra – whose title references the term used in some South Asian cultures to designate transgender or non-binary people, which his father used against him – Raja describes the struggles of a homosexual boy who cannot fit either the cultural expectations of his Pakistani family nor those of the surrounding Italian society, and is constantly faced with racist, patriarchal and homophobic prejudice and discrimination, in addition to experiencing a feeling of alienation deriving from culture shock. The book, in both content and style, is intended to promote multiculturalism as opposed to societal stereotypes and "purity" standards, with the author asserting that "future belongs to mixed people (Italian: meticci)," and to prioritize respect for others as necessary for their self-acceptance. Raja has said that his writings are a way to transform his personal hardships into something the public could reflect on, and to give a voice to underrepresented communities in Italy, including South Asians.

When his novel was being published in April 2024, Raja participated in the Mutipli Forti festival, organized by the Istituto Italiano di Cultura in New York City to promote contemporary Italian fiction internationally. Notable figures who appeared alongside him were Francesca Archibugi, Matteo B. Bianchi, Giulia Calenda, Giulia Caminito, Giancarlo De Cataldo, Viola Di Grado, Alain Elkann, Emily Greenhouse, Isabella Hammad, Daniele Mencarelli, Andrea Molesini, Carmen Pellegrino, Tommaso Pincio, Alice Urciolo, Nadeesha Uyangoda, Marina Valensise, Massimo Vallerani and Carlo Vecce. The following year, Raja participated in the Fabula Festival in Celje, Slovenia, upon the publication of his novel's Slovene edition.

=== Translations ===
In October 2024, Raja's short story "Andrea" was translated by Óscar Esquivias into Spanish and published by Mirlo magazine in an issue dedicated entirely to the city of Bologna.

== Personal life ==
Since 2014, Raja has lived in Bologna. Until February 2025, he was in a civil union with a man he had begun dating eight years prior. He identifies with the term frocio ('faggot') as a form of reappropriation. His practice of Islam is centered on a decolonial and non-binary perspective.

== See also ==
- Pakistanis in Italy
- Racism in Italy
- LGBTQ rights in Italy
- LGBTQ rights in Pakistan
