= Matteo Masiello =

Italian painter (1933–2020)

Matteo Masiello (Palo del Colle, November 30, 1933 - Bitonto, March 28, 2020) was an Italian painter.

== Biography ==
He was a self-taught artist. He graduated in economics and then later became a ministerial manager. His artistic experience began in the early 1970s, when he started bringing his works in Rome to some exhibitions by institutions and private galleries. Nello Ponente, art historian and pupil of Lionello Venturi, presents him in 1978 at an exhibition in Palermo. Masiello participated to the XI National Quadrennial of art of Rome and other artistic events in several other Italian cities.

He has subsequently exhibited in the United States of America, Belgium, Russia, Romania, Spain, Switzerland, Greece, Portugal, China and Israel. The artist has also set up his own exhibition at the European Parliament in Strasbourg. During his career he has edited the illustration of books, newspapers and various publications. His works are present in museums and cultural institutions in Italy and abroad, churches, universities, private and public collections and galleries.

In 2007, thanks mainly to the donation of his works to the Municipality of Bitonto, to which are added works of Apulian artists of level (lived between 1800 and 1900), is established at the Angevin Tower (resolution of 2008), the Civic Gallery of Contemporary Art of Bitonto.

In 2013, close to the anniversary of his 80th birthday, Masiello decided to transfer his works to Trani, at the Museum of the Beltrani Palace of Arts. Here his artistic inspiration goes to enrich the already large heritage of the museum of Trani. In Bitonto the master over the years had always exhibited his works in various exhibitions, not forgetting to pay homage to his hometown of Palo del Colle (in 2016 the last exhibition in the center of Bari). There are many exhibition opportunities also in Bari, as well as in many other Italian areas and cities. Over the years, there have also been many volumes that have thoroughly examined his artistic itinerary, edited by Raffaele Nigro and Lorenzo Ostuni. Valuable also some catalogs of exhibitions. Of the master have written numerous critics and art historians, distinguished professors, journalists and intellectuals. Here the words of Oscar Iarussi about him and his art. A famous "self-portrait" written by Masiello, a sort of very short autobiography, tells the story of his life in the name of art, thought and irony, with high poetic strokes. A Gallery entitled to the name of Masiello, with donation of several of his works, is also present at the University of Bari. He died in Bitonto, on March 28, 2020.

== Sister projects ==
- Wikimedia Commons contiene immagini o altri file su Matteo Masiello
