= Raja (name) =

Given name and family name

Raja is a common given name and a surname, derived from Sanskrit राजन् (rajan), meaning "king", "ruler".

== Given name ==
- Raja (Tamil actor), Indian Tamil-language film actor
- Raja Abel (born 1978), Indian film actor
- Raja Babu (Punyamurthula Appalaraju, Adeel Raja; 1937–1983), Indian actor
- Raja Bell (born 1976), American basketball player
- Raja Bundela, Indian actor and politician
- Raja Chaudhary (born 1975), Indian television actor
- Raja Chelliah (1922–2009), Indian economist
- Raja Fenske (born 1988), American actor
- Raja Gemini (Sutan Amrull; born 1974), American make-up artist and drag performer
- Raja Gosnell (born 1958), American film director
- Raja Ali Haji (1808–1873), Malay historian, poet and scholar
- Raja Hasan (born 1979), Indian playback singer
- Raja Jebali (born 1997), Tunisian para-athlete
- Raja Juli Antoni (born 1977), Indonesian politician
- Raja Petra Kamarudin (RPK; born 1950), Malaysian blogger
- Raja Kannappan, Indian politician
- Raja Kashif (born 1978), British musician
- Raja Koduri, Indian-American computer engineer
- Raja Kumari (born 1986), American singer
- Raja Nawathe (1924–2005), Indian film director
- Raja Paranjape (1910–1979), Indian film actor and director
- Raja Pervaiz Ashraf (born 1950), Pakistani politician and businessman
- Raja Rafe (born 1983), Syrian footballer
- Raja Ramanna (1925–2004), Indian nuclear physicist
- Raja Rao (1908–2006), Indian philosopher and writer
- Raja Reza, Malaysian diplomat
- Raja Shehadeh (born 1951), Palestinian lawyer and writer
- Raja Sen (born 1955), Indian film and television director
- Raja Toumi (born 1978), Tunisian handball player
- Raja Ravi Varma (1848–1906), Indian artist

== Surname ==
- A. Raja (Andimuthu Raja; born 1963), Indian politician
- A. K. T. Raja, Indian politician
- A. M. Raja (politician) (born 1928), Indian politician
- Abid Raja (born 1975), Pakistani-Norwegian lawyer and politician
- Adeel Raja (born 1980), Pakistani-Dutch cricketer
- Allar Raja (born 1983), Estonian rower
- Altaf Raja (born 1967), Indian singer
- Andres Raja (born 1982), Estonian decathlete
- Anita Raja (born 1953), Italian literary translator and library director
- Basit Raja (born 1993), Danish cricketer
- D. Raja (born 1949), Indian politician
- Dharma Raja (1724–1798), Maharajas of Travancore
- Farzana Raja (born 1970), Pakistani politician
- Hason Raja (1854–1922), Bangladeshi poet
- Jewel Raja (born 1989), Indian football player
- K. S. Raja (Kanakaratnam Sriskandarajah; ?–1989), Sri Lankan radio journalist
- Kanishka Raja (born 1970), artist
- Karthik Raja (born 1973), Indian musician
- Kasthuri Raja, Indian film director
- L. Raja, Indian film director and actor
- M. Raja (Raja Mohan), Indian film director
- Masood Ashraf Raja (born 1965), Pakistani literary and political scientist and writer
- Pazhassi Raja (1753–1805), Indian freedom fighter
- Purav Raja (born 1985), Indian tennis player
- Ramiz Raja (born 1962), Pakistani former cricketer
- Rameez Raja (born 1987), Pakistani cricketer
- Review Raja, Canadian film critic
- Rubina Raja, Danish professor of Classical archaeology
- S. Raja, Tamil oratora and actor
- Saif ur Rehman Raja (born 1994), Pakistani-Italian educator and author
- Samina Raja (1961–2012), Pakistani writer and translator
- Shivani Raja (born 1994), British politician
- Sivaji Raja, Indian film actor
- T. Raja (social worker) (born 1967), Indian humanitarian
- T. K. Raja, Indian politician
- Tarana Raja (born 1977), Indian film and television actress and dancer
- Wasim Raja (1952–2006), Pakistani cricketer
- Yuvan Shankar Raja (born 1979), Indian playback singer and composer
- Zaeem Raja (born 1965), Pakistani former cricketer

Fictional characters

- Rajah, Jasmine's pet tiger in Aladdin.

== Similar Arabic name ==
Raja (Arabic: رجاء) is an Arabic given name. The meaning of name Raja is "Hope" or Hopeful.

- Raja ibn Haywa, was a prominent early Muslim theological and political adviser of the Umayyad caliphs Abd al-Malik (r. 685–705), al-Walid I (r. 705–715), Sulayman (r. 715–717) and Umayyad caliph Umar (r. 717–720).

== See also ==
- Rajah (disambiguation)
