= Carmine Abate =

Italian writer (born 1954)

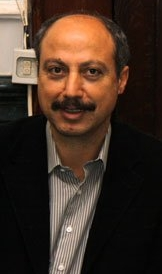
Carmine Abate

Carmine Abate (born 24 October 1954) is an Italian writer. He has written numerous short stories, novels and essays, mainly focusing on issues of migration and the encounters between disparate cultures.

== Life ==
Abate spent his childhood in Carfizzi, a small village of the Arbëreshë community in the southern region of Calabria. He grew up speaking Arbëresh, a variant of the Albanian language. After graduating from the University of Bari, he moved to Hamburg, where his father had earlier emigrated. There he taught at a school for immigrants and began publishing his first stories. In 1984, his first collection of short stories appeared under the title Den Koffer und weg! This was followed by a socio-anthropological study conducted jointly with Meike Behrmann; their account of a community of Calabrian emigrants was published as I Germanesi. Having spent more than a decade in Germany, Abate returned to Italy and settled in Besenello in Trentino, where he continues to work as a writer and teacher.

Abate has published several acclaimed novels and short story collections. Some of his award-winning books have been translated into English. The novel Tra due mari (2002) under the English title Between Two Seas; the novel La festa del ritorno (2004) as The Homecoming Party (2010); the collection of short stories Il banchetto di nozze e altri sapori (2016), as The Wedding Banquet and Other Flavors (2019); and the novel Il ballo tondo (1991) as The Round Dance (2023).

Abate's debut novel Il ballo tondo (1991) is an exclusive Bildungsroman set in Hora, a small Albanian colony built in the 15th century in the South of Italy that becomes a place of myth, legend, magic, love, life, and death, like the Macondo of Gabriel García Márquez. Published in 1991 by Marietti, relaunched by Fazi Editore in 2000, and then by Mondadori in 2005, the book has been translated and published in Germany, France, Albania, Portugal, Kosovo, Japan, and now in the United States, by Rutgers University Press. The novel won the ARGE ALP Readers' International Prize (2000) and was selected by Mondadori for the series “900 ITALIANO” (2016) as one of the100 best Italian novels of the twentieth century.

Abate's work has also been translated into several European languages and is now being translated into Arabic. He is represented by the leading publishing house Mondadori.

== Works ==
- Nel labirinto della vita, Rome: Juvenilia, 1977 (poetry)
- I Germanesi: storia e vita di una comunità calabrese e dei suoi emigranti, Carmine Abate and Meike Behrmann, Cosenza Pellegrini, 1986 (non-fiction)
- Il ballo tondo, Marietti, 1991 (novel)
- Shtegtimi i unazës, Pejë: Dukagjini, 1994
- Terre di andata, Argo, 1996 (poetry)
- La moto di Scanderbeg, Fazi, 1999. ISBN 978-88-04-57522-1 (winner of the Premio Racalmare-Leonardo Sciascia)
- Tra due mari, Mondadori, 2002 (winner of the Premio Società dei Lettori, Lucca-Roma)
- La festa del ritorno, Mondadori, (2004) (winner of the Premio Napoli, Premio Selezione Campiello and Premio Corrado Alvaro)
- Il muro dei muri, Mondadori, 2006 (short stories)
- Il mosaico del tempo grande, Mondadori, 2006 (novel)
- Gli anni veloci, Mondadori, 2008 (novel)
- Vivere per addizione a altri viaggi, Mondadori, 2010. ISBN 978-88-04-58541-1 (short stories)
- Terre di andata. Poesie & proesie, Il Maestrale, 2011.
- La collina del vento, Mondadori, 2012 (Premio Campiello).
- Le stagioni di Hora, Oscar Mondadori, 2012. [It includes: Il ballo tondo, La moto di Scanderbeg, Il mosaico del tempo grande] (novels)
- Il bacio del pane, Mondadori, 2013. ISBN 978-88-04-62927-6 (novel)
- La felicità dell'attesa, Mondadori, 2015. ISBN 978-88-04-65803-0 (novel)
- Il banchetto di nozze e altri sapori, Mondadori, 2016. (collection of short stories)
- Le rughe del sorriso, Mondadori, 2018. ISBN 978-88-04-70220-7 (novel)
- Il cercatore di luce, Mondadori, 2021. ISBN 978-88-04-73739-1 (novel)

== Works in English ==
- Between Two Seas (translated by Antony Shugaar), New York: Europa Editions, 2008. ISBN 978-1-933372-40-2
- The Homecoming Party (translated by Antony Shugaar), New York: Europa Editions, 2010. ISBN 978-1-933372-83-9
- The Wedding Banquet and Other Flavors (translated by Joseph A. Tamagni), Pesaro, Italy: Metauro, 2019.
- The Round Dance (translated by Michelangelo La Luna), New Brunswick, NJ: Rutgers University, 2023 (forthcoming).
