= Parcz =

- Village
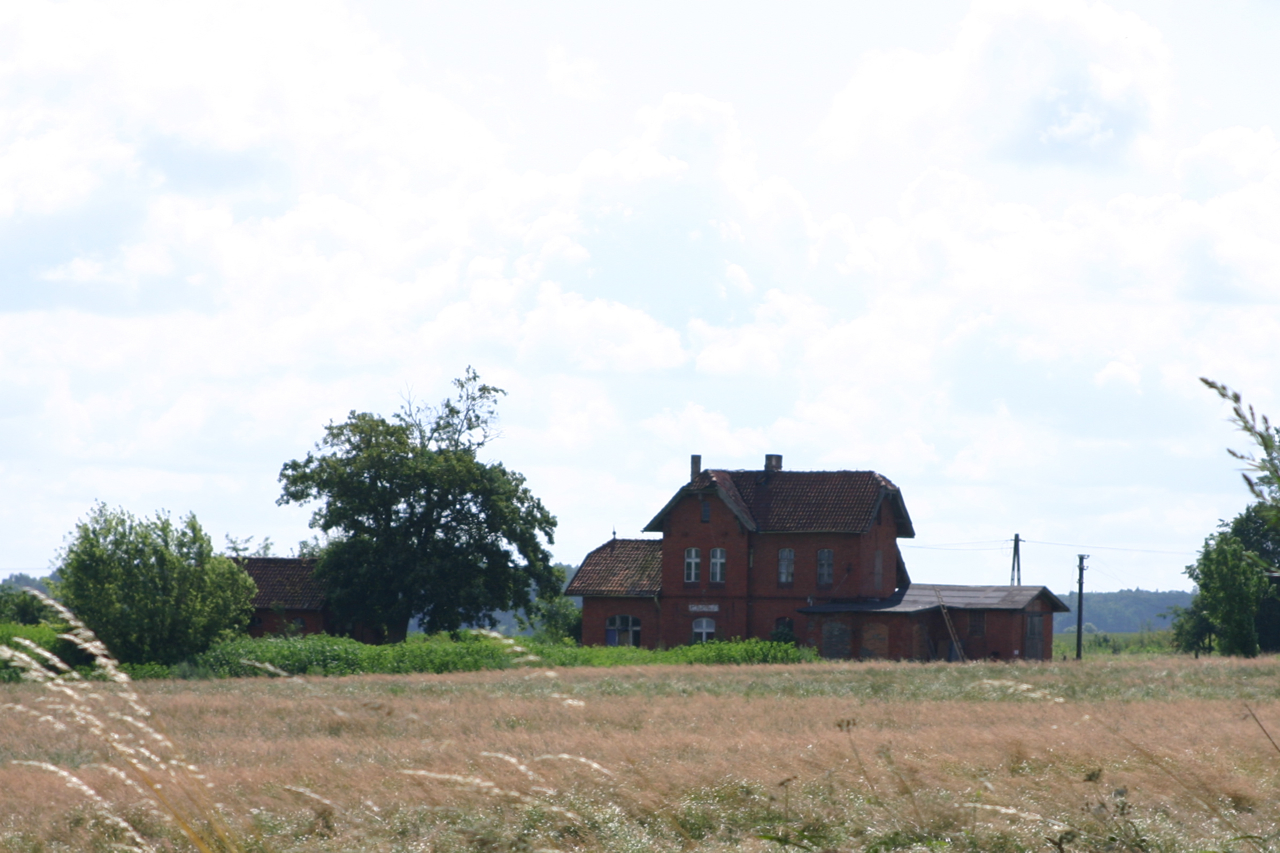

- Location within Poland
- Coordinates: 54°4′45″N 21°31′18″E
- Country: Poland
- Voivodeship: Warmian-Masurian
- County: Kętrzyn
- Gmina: Kętrzyn

Parcz [part͡ʂ] is a village in the administrative district of Gmina Kętrzyn, within Kętrzyn County, Warmian-Masurian Voivodeship, in northern Poland.

== History ==
In the area of the village in 1904, a barrow from the Bronze Age was discovered.

In the 14th century, there was a Prussian peasant village here, located on 16 włókas. There was one knight's service and a water mill. In 1378, the Grand Master of the Teutonic Knights Konrad von Wallenrod granted 60 włókas on Lake Parcz (the lake no longer exists today) under Chełmno law to two brothers, Więcek and Michał. The grant was witnessed by Ulrich von Jungingen.

In 1437, the owner of the village became Fryderyk von Partz. The name of the village was taken from the owner's surname. In the 16th century, the village belonged to the Kobylińskis, and in the 17th century to the Kalksteins. The most famous of this family is Krystian Kalkstein. His life story was presented in the television series Czarne chmur. Baron Fryderyk von Schenk zu Tautenberg bought the Parczów estates from the Kalksteins. Kętrzyński wrote about the Tautenbergs that they spoke Polish to their subjects. The Tautenbergs had their main family seat in Doba. In the 18th century, there was a windmill in the village. In 1913, the owner of Parcz was Georg Frhr. von Schenk zu Tautenberg (the family acquired the village at the beginning of the 19th century), and the lessee of the estate was Joachim Deuβ. The estate, together with the grange in Janków, had an area of 689 ha.

During World War II, a POW camp for Norwegians was located in Parcz, who were used for some work related to the construction of the Wolf's Lair. One of Adolf Hitler's food tasters, Margot Wölk, lived here for a time, after her house in Berlin was bombed in 1942.

The manor house in Parcz was built in the mid-19th century. The manor house is located between the park and the utility part. It is a two-storey building with a projection on the park side. The projection on the front elevation is preceded by a brick porch with a terrace. The manor house is covered with a gable roof. During World War II, the manor house was occupied for the needs of servicing the Wolf's Lair.

After 1945, a State Agricultural Farm was established in Parcz, which, before its liquidation, operated as an independent agricultural enterprise within the Pedigree Breeding Enterprise in Wopławki. The Agricultural Plant in Parcz included production facilities in Janków and Mażany. In Parcz there was a breeding farm of Złotnicka spotted pigs and a fur farm (foxes).
