= Ryan Mendoza =

American painter (born 1971)

Ryan Mendoza (born October 29, 1971, in New York City) is an American painter. He works and lives between Naples and Berlin. In his paintings, he counterbalances old master techniques with contemporary themes. In 2012, Ryan and his then 8-month-pregnant wife Fabia were briefly arrested in Naples after an art performance in solidarity with the Russian punk-rock band Pussy Riot in front of their studio in Rione Sanità.

His intimate diary Everything is Mine (Tutto è mio), curated by Simona Vinci, was released by the Italian publisher Bompiani in 2015.

In 2016, Mendoza was ranked number 147 of the 500 most successful US artists born after 1966 by Artnet.

== The White House ==
In 2016, he brought an entire house from Detroit to Europe. It was first on display at Art Rotterdam 2016. The White House is on permanent exhibition at the Verbeke Foundation, Belgium. With The White House, Mendoza wandered into a politically charged debate. He was initially only looking for a way of reconnecting with his identity as an American after living abroad for 24 years. However, The White House was described as a window into the Detroit's property problems.

The remnants of The White House project at 8 Mile and Livernois in Detroit were demolished in March 2016. Mendoza covered the costs of the demolition. A documentary on the project entitled The White House was directed by Fabia Mendoza.

== The Invitation ==
In June 2016, Mendoza painted two abandoned houses in Brightmoor, Detroit, for his installation The Invitation. Bullet-sized holes in the house façades spelled out the names Trump and Clinton. Mendoza officially invited the presidential candidates Hillary Clinton and Donald Trump to sleep a night in his installation, at what he called "the real White House," located in Detroit's troubled Brightmoor neighborhood. The presidential candidates both declined his invitation. Resident John O'Malley, a 60-year-old nurse battling cancer, was living between the two abandoned structures. He and urban activist Jonathan Pommerville reached out to Mendoza to help make his difficult situation public.

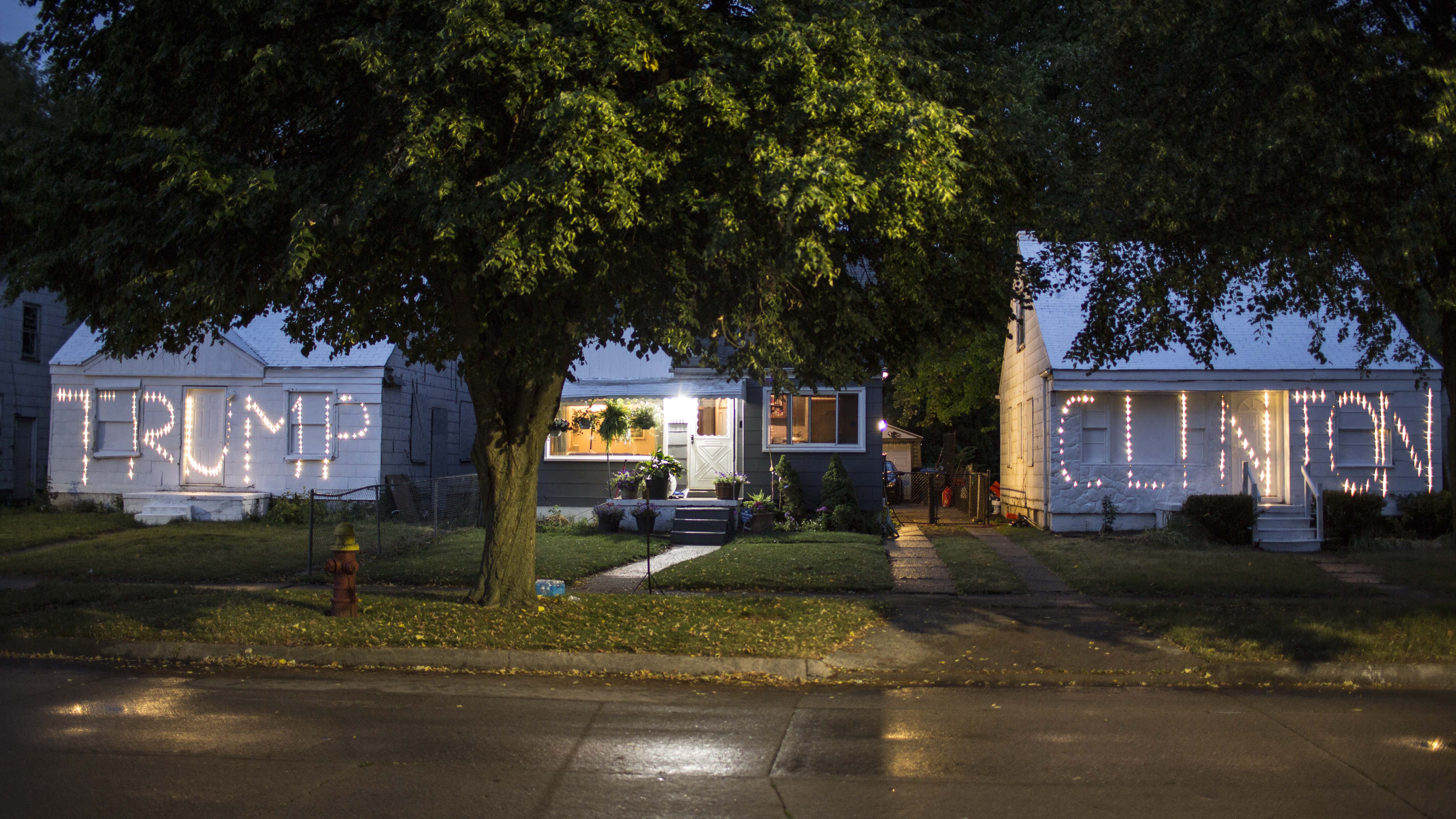

== Rosa Parks' House ==
Summer 2016, Rosa Parks' niece Rhea McCauley donated the former house where her aunt Rosa Parks lived from 1957 to 1959 in Detroit to Ryan Mendoza to help preserve the home of the American civil rights movement icon.

"All of my work deals with things and people who have been forgotten on some level," Mendoza stated to CNN in November 2016.

Rhea McCauley paid $500 to pull the house off the city's demolition list. Ryan Mendoza dismantled the house in 18 days with a group of friends, volunteers, musicians and those who made their tribute to Rosa Parks before the final demolition and shipped it to Europe where he rebuilt it in Berlin.

McCauley communicated to the press that as long as her aunt's legacy is not acknowledged in the US, she will bring the house to a place where it is acknowledged. "I know she has streets named after her and medals and awards, but I'm talking about truly understanding the significance of Auntie Rosa," said McCauley. "And I have talked to young people and they don't even know who my aunt is. And that's a shame. It's not their fault, but we as a country need to acknowledge, and if we can't, you know, I'll take her where she is acknowledged."

Both Mendoza and McCauley hoped that the house could eventually return one day to its rightful home, the US.

In October 2017, it was reported that the house would be shipped to and displayed in Providence, Rhode Island. Brown University was planning to exhibit the house, but the display was cancelled. The house was exhibited during part of 2018 in an arts centre Providence, Rhode Island.

== Other projects ==
Spring 2017, Mendoza painted the facade of a house in Moscow in the colors of the American flag. This street art project was followed by a series of about 50 photographs titled Putin, my Putin and shown by Berlin-based gallery Camera Work. American director and activist Rose McGowan was one of the models for the photographs.

== Selected Exhibits ==
2013: Les Aventures de la Vérité Peinture et Philosophie, Fondation Maeght, curated by Bernard-Henri Lévy

2013: Ryan Mendoza, Roger Ballen, Paul P., Gallerie Massimo Minini, Brescia

2011: Ryan Mendoza Selected works, Galerie Klueser2, Munich, Germany

2010: The Possessed Museo d’Arte Contemporanea Donna Regina, Naplel

2009: Chocolate Crocodile Galerie Lelong, Paris

2008: Ryan Mendoza Akira Ikeda Gallery, New York

2007: Don't look at me Galerie Lelong, Paris

2006: Happily ever Akira Ikeda Gallery, Berlin

2005: Ryan Mendoza Galerie Bernd Klueser, Munich

2004: Fear in a Time of Superheroes, Galleria Massimo Minini

2003: Sleeping Beauty Akira Ikeda Gallery, Taura, Japan

2002: Join Now for Instant Access White Cube, London

2002: Almost American, Museo di Castel Nuovo, Naples

2001: Ryan Mendoza, Overbeck Gesellschaft, Luebeck

2000: Ryan Mendoza Museo di arte moderna e contemporanea di Trento e Rovereto

1997: "Cadaver dog", Galleria studio legale, Caserta, Italy

== Literature ==
2016: Ryan Mendoza Welcome to America, Van Spijk Rekafa, ISBN 9789062169108

2015: Ryan Mendoza Tutto è mio, Bompiani, ISBN 978-88-452-7906-5

2010: Ryan Mendoza The Possessed, Electa, MAdRE, Text by Tiziano Scarpa, ISBN 978-88-370-7554-5 (2007): Ryan Mendoza The End, Text by Milan Kundera, ISBN 88-88098-12-7 (2007): Ryan Mendoza Don't look at me, Galerie Lelong

2003: Ryan Mendoza Sleeping Beauty, Taura, Japan

2002: Ryan Mendoza Almost American, Museo Castel Nuovo

2002: Ryan Mendoza Join Now for Instant Access, Text by Irvine Welsh

1998: Ryan Mendoza, Text by Alberto Fiz
