= At the Wolf's Table =

2018 novel

First edition

At the Wolf's Table (Italian: Le assaggiatrici; "The [Female] Tasters") is a 2018 novel by Italian author Rosella Postorino, with the English translation by Leah Janeczko. It is about a woman, Rosa Sauer, who becomes a food taster for Adolf Hitler during World War II. This is the first novel by Postorino to have an official English translation.

It was originally published by Giangiacomo Feltrinelli Editore in Italy in January 2018.

== Background ==
Postorino derived the story from that of real-life food taster Margot Wölk. The author used her own given name for the fictionalized version of the inspiration. Postorino learned about Wölk in 2014 after reading an article about her in an Italian newspaper, but Wölk died before Postorino had a chance to interview her. Postorino decided to write a novel with a fictional character due to the fact she never got to speak to Wölk.

== Plot ==
The main character is telling the story while in the present day as a senior citizen.

== Reception ==
The novel won the Premio Campiello literary prize.
