= Granzotto =

Granzotto is an Italian surname. Notable people with the surname include:

- Claudio Granzotto (1900–1947), Italian Franciscan friar and sculptor
- Gianni Granzotto (1914–1985), Italian writer, journalist, and war correspondent
