= Minimum fax =

minimum fax
- Founded: 1994; 32 years ago
- Founder: Marco Cassini and Daniele Di Gennaro
- Country of origin: Italy
- Headquarters location: Rome
- Publication types: Books
- Official website: www.minimumfax.com

minimum fax is an independent publishing house based in Rome. It was founded by Daniele di Gennaro and Marco Cassini in 1994 and it publishes books of Italian and foreign fiction, and popular non-fiction.

Among other foreign authors, it publishes in Italy books by Raymond Carver, Richard Yates, Charles Bukowski, David Foster Wallace, Lester Bangs, Donald Barthelme, John Barth, George Saunders, Lawrence Ferlinghetti, Leonard Cohen, Jonathan Lethem, Jennifer Egan, Kurt Vonnegut, Aimee Bender, etc.

In the Italian fiction collection, works by Ernesto Aloia, Antonio Pascale, Carlo Lucarelli, Andrea Camilleri, Paolo Cognetti, Raffaele La Capria, Nicola Lagioia, Valeria Parrella, Marcello Fois, Veronica Raimo, Claudia Durastanti, etc.

== History ==
The history of the minimum fax officially begins in 1993. Marco Cassini and Daniele Di Gennaro organized writing courses at the cultural association Essere o non-essere of Trastevere in Rome, until they decided to found their own magazine and to disseminate it via fax in offices, universities, schools, clubs.

=== Literary magazine ===
The magazine consisted mainly of a series of columns: "Ipse dixit", a series of flash self-reviews; "Mosaix", splinters of comic literature; "Faxtotum", a compass for orienting oneself in the universe of awards and events in the sector. The magazine also included an unpublished work signed by a big name and a space set up as a serial writing laboratory, which was attended by authors such as Dacia Maraini, Maria Luisa Spaziani, Dino Verde and Stanislao Nievo.

The magazine aroused the curiosity of many Italian intellectuals, including Raffaele La Capria, Sandro Veronesi, Filippo La Porta, Gino Castaldo, Goffredo Fofi.

=== From fax to paper books ===
In 1994 the first two series of books were born: "Filigrana", essays on the theory of writing, and "Typewriters", which for the first time brought to Italy the historical interview-books of Paris Review.

A short time later, the "Sotterranei" collection was released, dedicated to American fiction, music and poetry. Two new thematic collection have come to life from two branches of "Sotterranei": one was "Nichel", dedicated to the new Italian fiction, the other "I libri di Carver", which published the works of Raymond Carver.

=== Growth of the publishing house and new sectors ===
In 2003, from the meeting between Rosita Bonanno, Cassini and Di Gennaro, minimum fax media was born which aims to transform paper content into audiovisual, develop and produce audiovisuals for television and films for cinema.

In 2008, minimum fax published 35 books a year, has printed over 400 titles since birth, has a myriad of collaborators and organizes real happenings, where literature, music, theater and cinema coexist.

Turnover in 2007 is about one and a half million euros. In addition to the publishing house and minimum fax media, the following were born:

- minimum fax Libreria which took over a historic bookshop in Piazza di Santa Maria in Trastevere.
- minimum fax eventi which deals with readings and concerts.
- minimum lab which deals with training courses in publishing.

In 2017 Nicola Lagioia leaves the curatorship of the Italian fiction collection "Nichel", to which Fabio Stassi takes over.

In 2020 the novel by Remo Rapino Vita, morte e miracoli di Bonfiglio Liborio won the 58th edition of the Premio Campiello.

== The catalog ==
Indi
The collection dedicated to current events.
Sotterranei
The collection dedicated to American poetry and fiction, biographies and writings of the greats of jazz and Pop music.
Filigrana
The non-fiction collection.
I libri di Carver
The Complete Work of Raymond Carver.
Nichel
The collection dedicated to Italian fiction.
minimum classics
The collection of contemporary classics, unpublished or unavailable in Italy.
minimum fax cinema
The collection dedicated to screenplays, essays, interviews and reportages on cinema.
I Quindici
The collection that collects the best of fifteen years of hardback edition catalog.
I quaderni dello Straniero
The collection of social and cultural criticism directed by Goffredo Fofi.
Struffoli
The Italian and American humorous paperbacks.
La porta aperta
The review of the Teatro di Roma directed by Mario Martone.
I Mini
The collection of small books written by cult authors and translated by Italian writers, published in a limited edition.
Fuori collana
The collection dedicated to books that do not have a specific location in the catalog as they deal with the most disparate themes.
