= Veronica Raimo =

Italian screenwriter (born 1978)

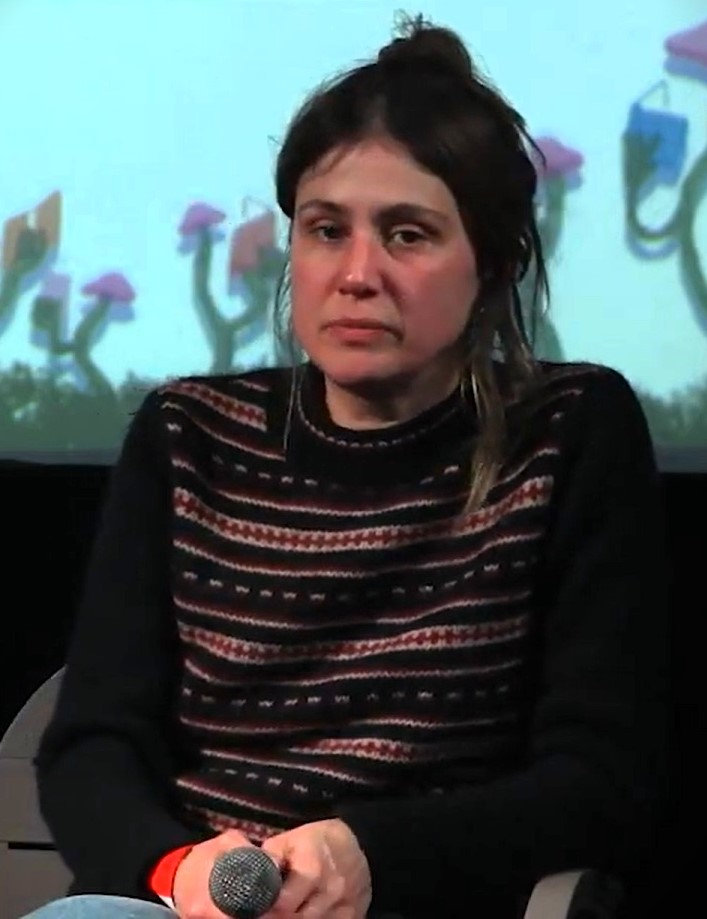
Raimo in 2024

Veronica Raimo (born 1978) is an Italian writer, translator, and screenwriter.

== Biography ==
Born in Rome in 1978, she earned a degree in literature with a thesis on German cinema. After graduation, she lived in Berlin, working as a researcher at Humboldt University. She is sister of the writer Christian Raimo.

== Career ==
After working as a translator from English for several publishing houses, Raimo published the novel Il dolore secondo Matteo in 2007. This debut was followed by two more novels, stories published in magazines and anthologies, and a collection of short stories published in Germany, Eines Tages alles dir. The Girl at the Door, published in October 2019 by Grove Atlantic, is her first novel to be translated into English.

In 2012, Raimo co-wrote the film Bella addormentata ("Sleeping Beauty") directed by Marco Bellocchio, receiving a 2013 Nastri d'argento (Silver Ribbon) nomination for best screenplay. Her articles and reviews have appeared in magazines and newspapers including Rolling Stone, la Repubblica XL, il manifesto, Corriere della Sera, and Amica. In 2022, she won the Premio Strega Giovani prize for her novel Niente di vero.

== Selected works ==
- Il dolore secondo Matteo, Minimum fax, 2007, ISBN 9788875211387
- Tutte le feste di domani, Rizzoli, 2013, ISBN 9788817064323
- Miden: romanzo, Mondadori, 2018, ISBN 9788804687580 (The girl at the door, 4th Estate, 2020, ISBN 9780008326364, trans. Stash Luczkiw)
- Le bambinacce, Feltrinelli, 2019, ISBN 9788807033599
- Lezioni di anatomia: il corpo umano in quindici storie, Minimum fax, 2019, ISBN 9788833890883
- Niente di vero, Einaudi, 2022, ISBN 9788806251895 (Lost on Me, Virago, 2023, ISBN 978080216204-5, trans. Leah Janeczko)
- La Vita è breve, eccetera 2023

== Links ==
Works by Veronica Raimo at Open Library
