= Marta Morazzoni =

Italian educator and writer (born 1950)

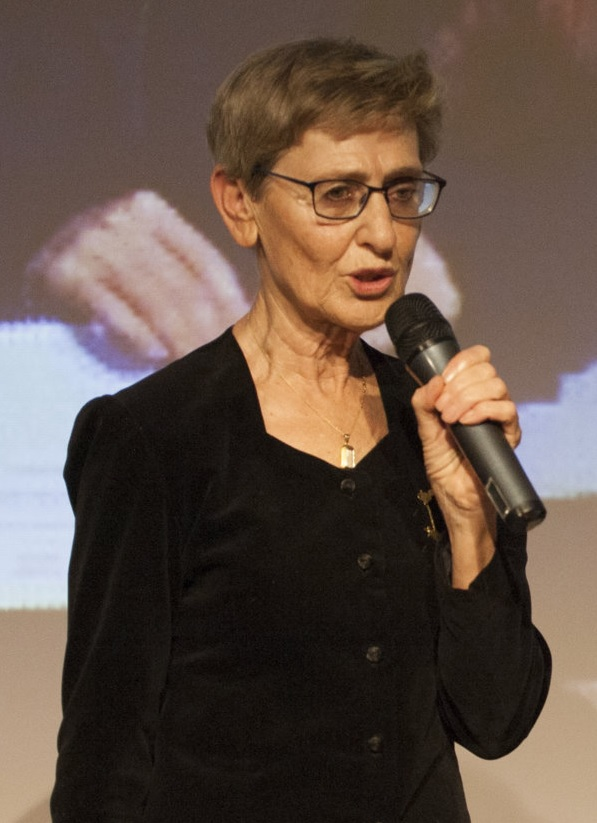

Marta Morazzoni (born 1950) is an Italian educator and writer.

She was born at Gallarate in Lombardy and studied philosophy at the University of Milan. She taught high school literature at Gallarate. She published La Ragazza col turbante (The Girl with the Turban), a group of stories, in 1986; it was translated into nine languages. Her 1988 novel L'invenzione della verità (The invention of truth) was a finalist for the Premio Campiello. The novel Il caso Courrier published in 1997 was awarded the Premio Campiello and, in 2001, the Independent Foreign Fiction Prize.

== Biography ==
The daughter of a textile machinery entrepreneur and the director of an embroidery workshop, after completing her classical high school education, she graduated from the Faculty of Philosophy at the University of Milan.

In 1986, she began working with the Longanesi publishing house: her debut novel, La ragazza col turbante (The Girl with the Turban), was a finalist for the Strega Prize and has been translated into nine languages. His subsequent works enjoyed similar critical acclaim: in 1988, L'invenzione della verità (The Invention of Truth) (Campiello Selection Prize); in 1992, Casa materna (Mother's House) (Campiello Selection Prize); and in 1997, Il caso Courrier (The Courrier Case) (Campiello Prize).

She has also written theater Magazine for specialized magazines.

In 1995, Corbaccio published his translation of Edith Wharton The Gods Arrive under the title Il canto delle muse (The Song of the Muses).

He taught literature at a technical institute in Gallarate. He has been a member of the technical jury of the Chiara Prize on several occasions (including as president), which he won in 2019.

As she herself stated, reading Cesare Pavese, Marcel Proust, and contemporary Scandinavian fiction was fundamental to her vocation as a writer.

== Selected works ==
- Casa materna (His Mother's House), novel (1992) - finalist for the Premio Campiello
- L'estuario (Estuary), novel (1996)
- Una lezione di stile (A lesson in style), novel (2002)
- Un incontro inatteso per il consigliere Goethe (An unexpected meeting for counsellor Geothe) (2005)
