= Rai Cinema =

Italian production company

Rai Cinema S.p.A.
- Company type: Società per azioni (S.p.A.)
- Industry: Entertainment
- Founded: 1 December 1999; 26 years ago
- Headquarters: Rome, Italy
- Key people: Paolo del Brocco (CEO)
- Revenue: ▲€284.0 million (2024)
- Net income: ▲€13.4 million (2024)
- Number of employees: 165 (2024)
- Parent: RAI
- Divisions: 01 Distribution
- Subsidiaries: Rai Cinema International Distribution
- Website: rai.it/raicinema

Rai Cinema S.p.A. is an Italian film production company owned by RAI, the national public broadcaster of Italy. Since its inception, the company has invested nearly €1 billion in the production of over 900 films.

== History ==
Rai Cinema was formed as a spin-off of RAI's former Acquisto, Produzione e Vendita (APV) branch. The company was incorporated on 1 December 1999, and operations commenced on 1 June 2000. Giuliano Montaldo was appointed its first president, a role he held until 2004. Franco Scaglia took over following Montaldo's departure, and remained in the position until 2013. Paolo Del Brocco was elected CEO in 2010.

By 2010, Rai Cinema had contributed to the production of over 300 films, investing a total of €425 million. In 2004, the company invested around €30 million in production costs for its films. That figure increased to €45 million in 2010 and €65 million in 2015. In May 2018, Rai Cinema joined the Globalgate Entertainment consortium. In 2022, the company invested €85 million in the production of 80 films.

== Divisions and subsidiaries ==
=== 01 Distribution ===
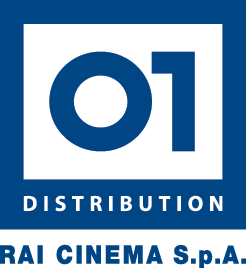

01 Distribution, a film distribution company, was founded in 2001 from a joint venture between Rai Cinema and French production and distribution company StudioCanal. StudioCanal divested itself from the venture in June 2003, and Rai Cinema acquired its 50% stake to become the sole owner. In 2010, Rai Cinema merged with 01 Distribution, with the latter becoming a division of the former. By that year, 01 Distribution had distributed a total of 240 films since its inception, 130 of which were Italian productions; they totaled 75 million admissions and €440 million grossed at the box office.

=== Rai Cinema International Distribution ===
Rai Cinema International Distribution, a standalone international film sales company, was launched by Rai Cinema in February 2024.
