= Ugo Riccarelli =

Italian writer (1954–2013)

Ugo Riccarelli (3 December 1954 – 21 July 2013) was an Italian novelist and short story writer.

Born in Turin, Riccarelli read philosophy at the University of Turin. He won the 1998 Campiello Prize for Un uomo che forse si chiamava Schulz and the 2004 Strega Prize for his novel, Il dolore perfetto (The Perfect Pain).
