= Premio Campiello =

Italian literary award

The Premio Campiello is an annual Italian literary prize. A jury of literary experts (giuria di letterati in Italian) identifies books published during the year and, in a public hearing, selects five of those as finalists. These books are called Premio Selezione Campiello. Then a jury of 300 readers (called giuria dei 300 lettori) representing different social, cultural and professional groups from each region of Italy, each with one vote, decides the winner of the selection. Since 2004, the jury of literary experts awards a Premio Campiello Opera Prima for the best debut.

== History ==
In 1962 Confindustria Veneto was seeking a contact between business and the literary sector and decided to formulate a literary prize. The first award was given to Primo Levi for his autobiographical book La tregua, translated in Britain as The Truce and in the United States as Reawakening. The ceremony took place in Venice's Teatro Verde on the island of San Giorgio Maggiore on 3 September 1963.

Today, the prize is still promoted by Italian businessmen from the Veneto region and it serves to promote Italian literature.

There is a literary prize for young authors, called Campiello Giovani. Participants must prove that they are between 15 and 22 years of age to qualify. The committee that determines the Campiello Giovani is made up of young people. Very often previous winners and finalists serve on the initial jury to determine the current participants. Then, three teachers vote for the five finalists, and the Jury of 300 select the winner.

Some foreign countries, like Germany and Spain, have begun to award a prize called Campiello using the same model.

== Name ==
The word campiello is the diminutive of campo. Unlike other cities that use the word piazza to designate plazas and squares, Venice uses the word campo. Campiello is a little square.

== Winners ==
Year	Winner	Author	Publisher	Other prizes
1963	La tregua	Primo Levi	Einaudi	
1964	Il male oscuro	Giuseppe Berto	Rizzoli	
1965	La compromissione	Mario Pomilio	Vallecchi	
1966	Questa specie d'amore	Alberto Bevilacqua	Rizzoli	
1967	Orfeo in Paradiso	Luigi Santucci	Mondadori	
1968	L'avventura di un povero cristiano	Ignazio Silone	Mondadori	
1969	L'Airone	Giorgio Bassani	Mondadori	
1970	L'attore	Mario Soldati	Mondadori	
1971	Ritratto in piedi	Gianna Manzini	Mondadori	
1972	Per le antiche scale	Mario Tobino	Mondadori	
1973	Il trono di legno	Carlo Sgorlon	Mondadori	
1974	Alessandra	Stefano Terra	Bompiani	
1975	Il prato in fondo al mare	Stanislao Nievo	Mondadori	
1976	Il busto di gesso	Gaetano Tumiati	Mursia	
1977	Il selvaggio di Santa Venere	Saverio Strati	Mondadori	
1978	Carlo Magno	Gianni Granzotto	Mondadori	
1979	Storia di Tönle	Mario Rigoni Stern	Einaudi	
1980	Il fratello italiano	Giovanni Arpino	Rizzoli	
1981	Diceria dell'untore	Gesualdo Bufalino	Sellerio	
1982	Se non-ora quando?	Primo Levi	Einaudi	
1983	La conchiglia di Anataj	Carlo Sgorlon	Mondadori	
1984	Per amore, solo per amore	Pasquale Festa Campanile	Bompiani	
1985	Gli occhi di una donna	Mario Biondi	Longanesi	
1986	La partita	Alberto Ongaro	Longanesi	
1987	I fuochi del Basento	Raffaele Nigro	Camunia	
1988	Le strade di polvere	Rosetta Loy	Einaudi	
1989	Effetti personali	Francesca Duranti	Rizzoli	
1990	La lunga vita di Marianna Ucrìa	Dacia Maraini	Rizzoli	
1991	Di buona famiglia	Isabella Bossi Fedrigotti	Longanesi	
1992	La casa a Nord-Est	Sergio Maldini	Marsilio	
1993	La valle dei cavalieri	Raffaele Crovi	Mondadori	
1994	Sostiene Pereira	Antonio Tabucchi	Feltrinelli	
1995	Il coraggio del pettirosso	Maurizio Maggiani	Feltrinelli	
1996	Esilio	Enzo Bettiza	Mondadori	
1997	Il caso Courrier	Marta Morazzoni	Longanesi	
1998	Il talento	Cesare De Marchi	Feltrinelli	
1999	Fuochi fiammanti a un’hora di notte	Ermanno Rea	Rizzoli	
2000	La forza del passato	Sandro Veronesi	Bompiani	
2001	Nati due volte	Giuseppe Pontiggia	Mondadori	
2002	Il custode dell’acqua	Franco Scaglia	Piemme	
2003	Il Maestro dei santi pallidi	Marco Santagata	Guanda	
2004	Una barca nel bosco	Paola Mastrocola	Guanda	Opera prima: Mosca più balena di Valeria Parrella
2005	Mandami a dire and Il sopravvissuto (tie)	Pino Roveredo; Antonio Scurati	Bompiani	Opera prima: Con le peggiori intenzioni di Alessandro Piperno
2006	La vedova scalza	Salvatore Niffoi	Adelphi	Opera prima: Senza coda di Marco Missiroli
2007	Mille anni che sto qui	Mariolina Venezia	Einaudi	Opera prima: Fìdeg di Paolo Colagrande
2008	Rossovermiglio	Benedetta Cibrario	Feltrinelli	Opera prima: La solitudine dei numeri primi di Paolo Giordano
2009	Venuto al mondo	Margaret Mazzantini	Mondadori	Opera prima: L'ultima estate di Cesarina Vighy
2010	Accabadora	Michela Murgia	Einaudi	Opera prima: Acciaio di Silvia Avallone
2011	Non tutti i bastardi sono di Vienna	Andrea Molesini	Sellerio	Opera prima: Settanta acrilico trenta lana di Viola Di Grado
2012	La collina del vento	Carmine Abate	Mondadori	Opera prima: Il trono vuoto di Roberto Andò
2013	L'amore graffia il mondo	Ugo Riccarelli	Mondadori	Opera prima: Cate, io di Matteo Cellini
2014	Morte di un uomo felice	Giorgio Fontana	Sellerio	Opera prima: La fabbrica del panico di Stefano Valenti
2015	L'ultimo arrivato	Marco Balzano	Sellerio	Opera prima: La vita prodigiosa di Isidoro Sifflotin di Enrico Ianniello; Fondazione Il Campiello: Sebastiano Vassalli; Campiello Giovani: Eva Luna Mascolino, Je Suis Charlie
2016	La prima verità	Simona Vinci	Einaudi	Opera prima: La teologia del cinghiale di Gesuino Némus; Fondazione Il Campiello: Ferdinando Camon; Campiello Giovani: Ludovica Medaglia, Wanderer (Viandante)
2017	L'arminuta	Donatella Di Pietrantonio	Einaudi	Opera prima: Un buon posto dove stare di Francesca Manfredi; Fondazione Il Campiello: Rosetta Loy; Campiello Giovani: Andrea Zancanaro, Ognuno ha il suo mostro
2018	Le assaggiatrici	Rosella Postorino	Feltrinelli	Opera prima: Gli 80 di Campo Rammaglia di Valerio Valentini; Fondazione Il Campiello: Marta Morazzoni; Campiello Giovani: Elettra Solignani, Con i mattoni
2019	Madrigale senza suono	Andrea Tarabbia	Bollati Boringhieri	Opera prima: Hamburg di Marco Lupo; Fondazione Il Campiello: Isabella Bossi Fedrigotti; Campiello Giovani: Matteo Porru, Talismani
2020	Vita, morte e miracoli di Bonfiglio Liborio	Remo Rapino	Minimum fax	Opera prima: Le isole di Norman di Veronica Galletta; Fondazione Il Campiello: Alessandro Baricco; Campiello Giovani: Michela Panichi, Meduse
2021	L'acqua del lago non è mai dolce	Giulia Caminito	Bompiani	Opera prima: Dieci storie quasi vere di Daniela Gambaro; Fondazione Il Campiello: Daniele Del Giudice; Campiello Giovani: Alice Scalas Bianco, Ritratto di Parigi
2022	I miei stupidi intenti	Bernardo Zannoni	Sellerio	Opera prima: Altro nulla da segnalare di Francesca Valente; Fondazione Il Campiello: Corrado Stajano; Campiello Giovani: Alberto Bartolo Varsalona, La Spartenza
2024	Alma	Federica Manzon	Feltrinelli	

== Premio Speciale ==
From 1997 to 2003 Fondazione Il Campiello awarded a special prize (Premio Speciale della Giuria dei Letterati) which recognized contemporary writers for distinguished work throughout their lifetime. The Premio Speciale was awarded to:

- Anna Maria Ortese (1997)
- Elio Pagliarani (1998)
- Maria Corti (1999)
- Franco Lucentini (2000)
- Raffaele La Capria (2001)
- Michel Tournier (2002)
- Edoardo Sanguineti (2003)
