= Giorgio Fontana =

Italian writer

Giorgio Fontana (born 22 April 1981) is an Italian writer currently living and working in Milan.

== Biography ==
Born and raised in the province of Varese, Fontana studied Philosophy at the University of Milan, and graduated with a final dissertation on Hilary Putnam's internal realism.

In 2007 he published his debut novel Buoni propositi per l'anno nuovo (Mondadori), which was followed by Novalis (Marsilio) in 2008.

With his narrative report on immigrants in Milan Babele 56. Otto fermate nella città che cambia (Terre di Mezzo), he became one of the finalists for the Premio Tondelli in 2009. In 2011, he released La velocità del buio, an essay on Berlusconism and Italian identity (Zona).

Per legge superiore (2011) won several literary prizes, such as the Premio Racalmare - Leonardo Sciascia 2012, the Premio lo Straniero 2012 and the 26th edition of the Premio Chianti. The book had seven reprints and has been translated into French (Seuil) German (Nagel&Kimche), Dutch (Wereldbibliotheek) and Spanish (Libros del Asteroide).

Morte di un uomo felice (Sellerio 2014) brings the justice and law diptych – started with Per legge superiore – to a close. The book won the Premio Campiello 2014 and the Premio Loria 2014 and was translated in eight countries.

After a brief novella (Un solo paradiso, Sellerio 2016) he published the vast family saga Prima di noi (Sellerio 2020), which won several prizes.

In 2019 he also published a comic book about the Deep Sea Slum in Nairobi, Lamiere (Feltrinelli), in collaboration with Danilo Deninotti e Lucio Ruvidotti.

At present, he lives and works in Milan. He is one of the scriptwriters for the weekly comic "Topolino", the popular Italian weekly newspaper containing illustrated tales with Mickey Mouse. He also collaborates with the Sunday magazine of "Sole 24 ore" and other Italian magazines, and teaches creative writing at Scuola Holden and Scuola Belleville.

== Works ==
=== Fiction ===
- Buoni propositi per l'anno nuovo, Mondadori 2007.
- Novalis, Marsilio 2008.
- Babele 56. Otto fermate nella città che cambia, Terre di Mezzo 2008 e 2014.
- Per legge superiore, Sellerio 2011.
- Morte di un uomo felice, Sellerio 2014. Awarded with the Premio Campiello 2014.
- Un solo paradiso, Sellerio 2016.
- Prima di noi, Sellerio 2020.
- Il mago di Riga, Sellerio, 2022.

=== Essays ===
- La velocità del buio, Zona 2011.

=== Comics ===
- Lamiere, Feltrinelli 2019 (con Danilo Deninotti e Lucio Ruvidotti)

== Awards ==
- Premio Sodalitas per il Giornalismo Sociale - Sezione Web 2011
- Premio lo Straniero 2012
- Premio Racalmare - Leonardo Sciascia 2012
- Premio Letterario Chianti - 26th edition - 2013
- Premio Campiello 2014
- Premio Loria 2014
- Premio Scrivere per Amore 2017
- Premio Salgari 2020
- Premio Mondello 2020
- Premio della critica del Premio Brianza 2020
- Premio Bagutta 2021
