= Francesca Manfredi =

Italian author

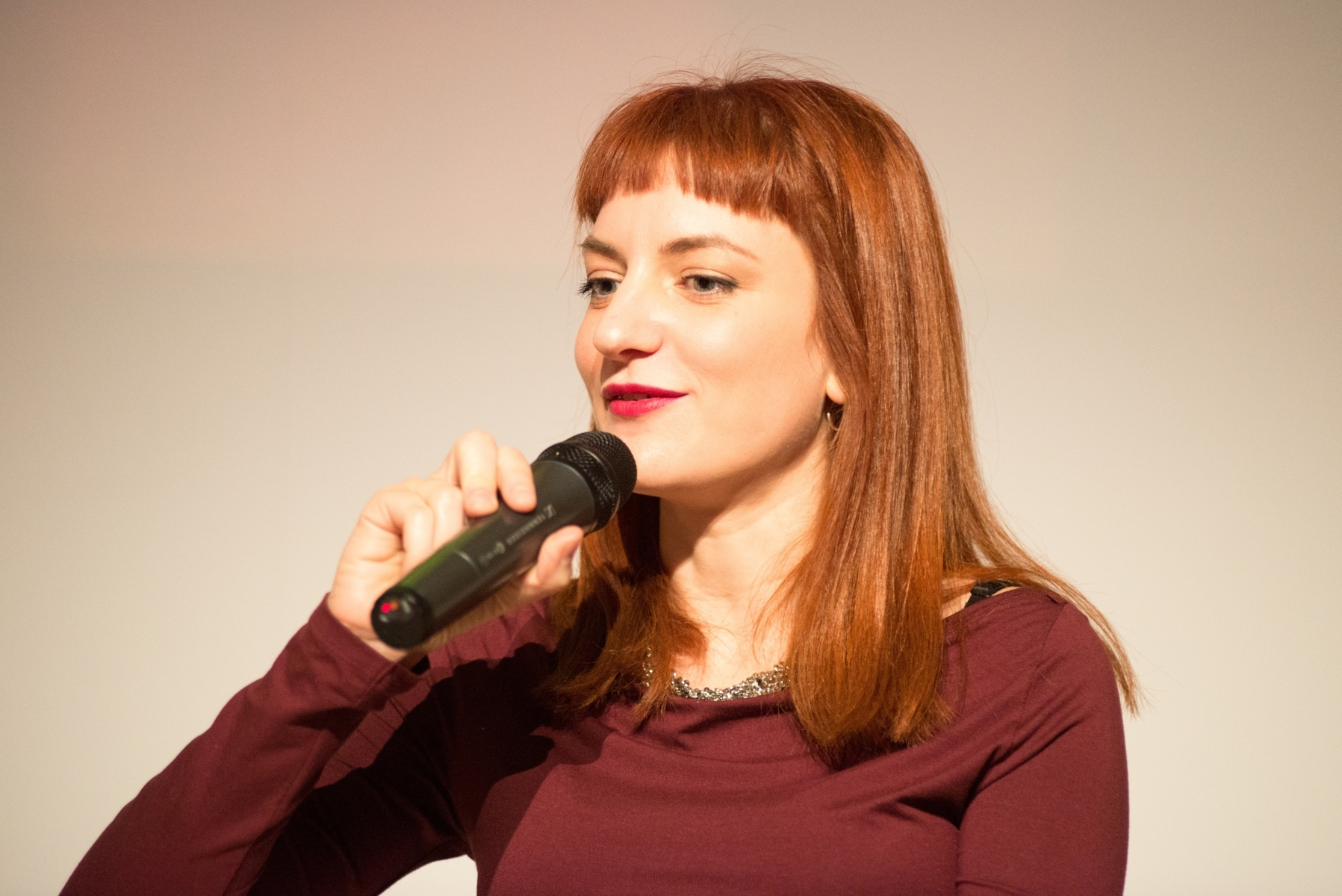
Francesca Manfredi

Francesca Manfredi (born 1988) is an Italian author.

== Biography ==
In 2015, Francesca was one of the authors who produced the theatre series "6Bianca" for Turin's Teatro Stabile. She holds courses at Turin's creative writing school Scuola Holden, which was founded in 1994 by Italian author Alessandro Baricco. Here, she met the American literary agent Andrew Wylie, on the occasion of a guest lecture that he held, and he later became her representative. Some of her works were published on the Italian magazine Linus and on the newspaper Corriere della Sera. In an interview, she claimed to have been influenced by Raymond Carver's minimalism. Her first collection of short stories, Un buon posto dove stare was awarded the "Premio Campiello" in the "Opera Prima 2017" section. In 2019, she published her first novel, L'impero della polvere with the publishing house "La nave di Teseo".

== Works ==
- 2017, Un buon posto dove stare, La nave di Teseo
- 2018, Ora di cena, De Piante Editore
- 2019, L'impero della polvere, La nave di Teseo
