= Raffaele Nigro =

Italian writer and journalist

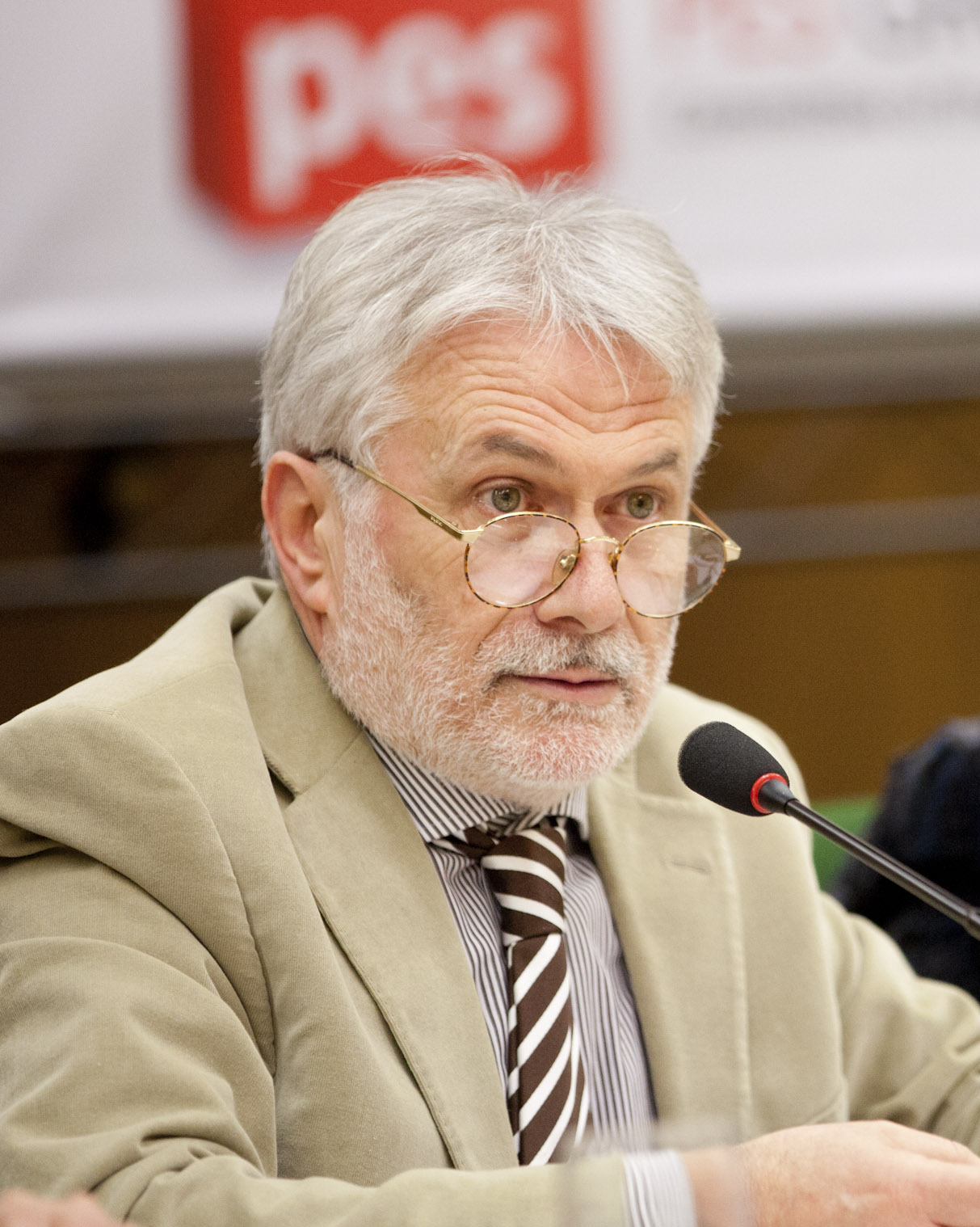
- Nigro in 2012
- Born: 9 November 1947 (age 78); Melfi, Province of Potenza, Italy
- Occupations: Writer, journalist

Raffaele Nigro (9 November 1947) is an Italian writer and journalist.

== Life and career ==
Raffaele Nigro was born in Melfi, Basilicata. He lives and works in Bari, where he was a programmer-director from 1979 to 1989. Member of the Order of Journalists of Apulia, he was appointed director and subsequently editor-in-chief for the regional headquarters of RAI.

As a journalist, Nigro collaborates with the newspapers Avvenire, Il Mattino, and Corriere della Sera. For his 1987 work I fuochi del Basento, he was awarded with the Premio Campiello and the Premio Napoli. In 1997, he published Adriatico, a finalist for the Premio Strega.

== Works ==
- A certe ore del giorno e della notte, Bastogi, 1986.
- I fuochi del Basento, Camunia, 1987.
- La baronessa dell'Olivento, Camunia, 1990.
- Il piantatore di lune e altri racconti, Rizzoli, 1991.
- Ombre sull'Ofanto, Camunia, 1992.
- Dio di Levante, Mondadori, 1994.
- Adriatico, Giunti, 1998.
- Desdemona e Cola Cola, Giunti, 1999
- Viaggio a Salamanca, Aragno, 2000
- Gli asini volanti, Aragno, 2002
- Malvarosa, Rizzoli, 2005.
- L'utopia della città felice: un racconto con dodici finali, Gremese, 2006.
- Maschere serene e disperate, Manni, 2008
- Santa Maria delle Battaglie, Rizzoli, 2009.
- Fernanda e gli elefanti bianchi di Hemingway, Rizzoli, 2010.
- Memorie di un barbaro e di un latino, Stilos, 2010.
- Gente in Adriatico, Mario Adda Editore, 2013.
- Il muro del mare, LBN, 2013.
- Il custode del museo delle cere, Rizzoli, 2013.
- Il cuoco dell'imperatore, La Nave di Teseo, 2021.
