= Valeria Parrella =

Italian author, playwright and activist

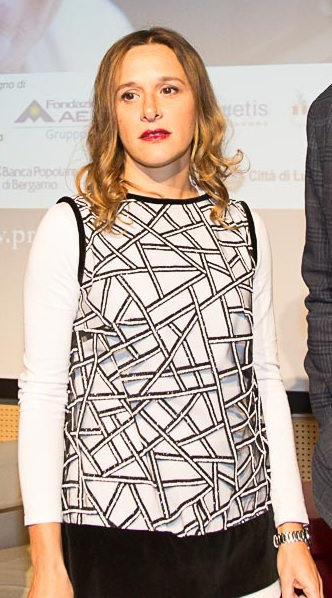
Valeria Parrella in 2016

Valeria Parrella (born 1974) is an Italian author, playwright and activist.

In 2005, her collection of short stories Per grazia ricevuta (For grace received, English translation by Antony Shugaar, 2009) was shortlisted for the Premio Strega, Italy's most prestigious literature award, and it won the Premio Renato Fucini for the best short stories collection. In 2020, she was shortlisted for the Premio Lattes Grinzane.

== Bibliography and publications ==
She was born in Torre del Greco in the Province of Naples, in 1974.

Parrella graduated in Classical Literature at University of Naples Federico II and later specialized in Italian Sign Language. In 2003, she published her first work, the collection of short stories Mosca più balena, for which she was awarded the Premio Campiello in 2004 for the best debut, as well as the Premio Procida-Isola di Arturo-Elsa Morante.

Her stories have appeared in the anthologies Pensa alla salute (2003), Bloody Europe (2004) and La qualità dell'aria (2004) and in numerous journals.

Since 2007, she has also been writing theatre pieces, while in 2008, she published her first novel, Lo spazio bianco, which won the Premio Letterario Basilicata. In 2009, the book was adapted into a movie with the same title, which was presented at the 66th Venice Film Festival. Thanks to this film, Parrella won the award Premio Tonino Guerra for best character at the Bari International Film Festival 2010. She has written several other short stories and novels, collaborates with the newspapers La Repubblica and L'Espresso and has her own column in the magazine Grazia.

== Works ==
Short Stories

- Mosca più balena, minimum fax, Roma. 2003
- Per grazia ricevuta, minimum fax, Roma, 2005, For grace received, English translation by Antony Shugaar, Europa editions, 2009
- Troppa importanza all'amore, 2015

Novels

- Lo spazio bianco, Einaudi, 2008
- Ma quale amore, Rizzoli, 2010
- Lettera di dimissioni, Einaudi, 2011
- Tempo di imparare, Einaudi, 2014
- Enciclopedia della donna. Aggiornamento, Einaudi, 2017
- Almarina, Einaudi, 2019
