= Franco Scaglia =

Italian writer and journalist

- Born: 27 March 1944; Camogli, Italy
- Died: 6 July 2015 (aged 71); Rome, Italy
- Occupation: Writer
- Spouse: Mascia Musy

Franco Scaglia (27 March 1944 – 6 July 2015) was an Italian writer and journalist.

== Biography ==
Born in Camogli, the son of the conductor Ferruccio, Scaglia started his career as a journalist, collaborating with the newspapers Il Messaggero, L'Unità, Il Tempo, Il Piccolo and Avanti!, among others. For over forty years he worked for RAI, notably being president of Rai Cinema between 2004 and 2013.

Scaglia was also a novelist, and among other things he wrote a cycle of novels about the adventures of a Franciscan friar, Padre Matteo (Father Matthew); the first novel of the series, Il custode dell'acqua, earned him the Campiello prize in 2002. During his varied career, he was also an essayist, an author of fables, a translator, a producer, a documentarist, a playwright, as well as a radio and television writer.
