= Saifur Rehman =

Saifur Rahman, Saif-ur-Rahman, Saifur Rehman or Saif-ur-Rehman (Arabic: سيف الرحمن, romanized: Sayf ar-Raḥmān, lit. 'sword of the Most Gracious') is a male Muslim name, chiefly used in South Asia. Notable people with the name include:

- Abu Taher Md. Saifur Rahman (born 1966), Bangladeshi judge
- Akhundzada Saif-ur-Rahman Mubarak (1925–2010), Afghan Sufi sheikh of the Naqshbandi Mujaddadi Tariqa
- Md. Saifur Rahman (born 1951), Bangladeshi politician
- Noor-e-Helal Saifur Rahman, Bangladeshi diplomat
- Saifur Rahman (Bangladeshi politician) (1932–2009), Bangladeshi economist and politician
- Saifur Rehman (Pakistani politician, born 1954)
- Saif-ur-Rehman (prisoner) (born 1982), Pakistani national detained in Chile on suspicion of terrorism
- Saifur Rahman Bhandari, Bangladeshi politician
- Saif-ur-Rehman Mansoor (died 2008), Afghan Taliban commander
- Saifur Rahman Halimi, Afghan-American political and legal representative
- Saif-ur-Rehman (cricketer, born 1996), Pakistani cricketer
- Saif-ur-Rehman (cricketer, born 1998), Pakistani cricketer
- Saifur Rehman Khan (Pakistani politician, 2018–)
- Saifur Rahman Moni (born 1981), Bangladeshi football player and coach
- Saifur Rahman Nizami (born 1916), Bangladeshi Islamic scholar
- Saif ur Rehman Raja (born 1994), Pakistani-Italian educator and author
- Saifur Rahman Rana, Bangladeshi politician

== See also ==
- Saifur Rahman Stadium, a multi-use stadium in Moulvibazar, Bangladesh
