= Viola Di Grado =

Italian writer

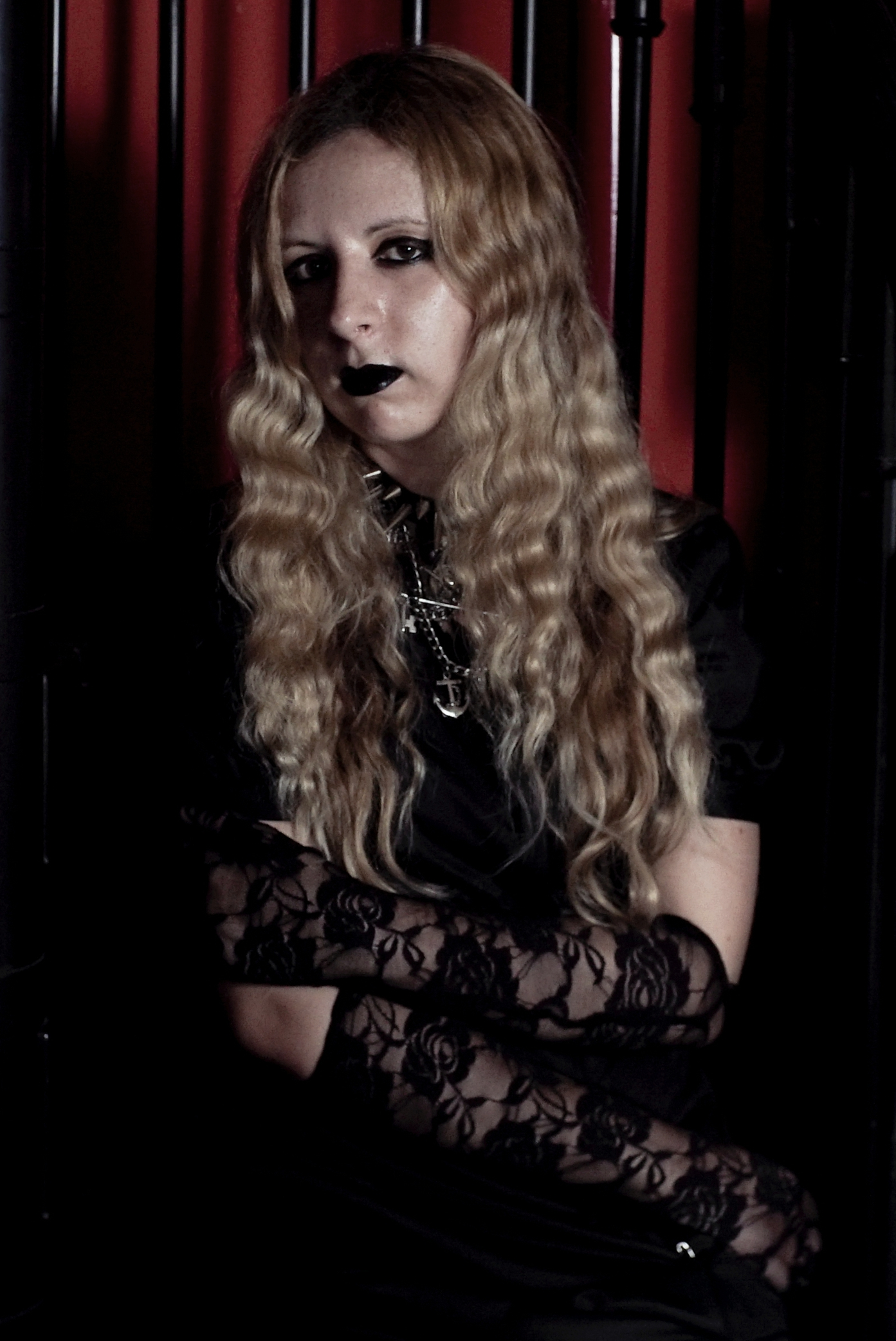
Viola Di Grado

Viola Di Grado (Catania, June 4, 1987) is an Italian writer. With her first novel 70% Acrylic 30% Wool, published when she was 23 years old, she became the youngest winner of the Premio Campiello Opera Prima and the youngest finalist for the Premio Strega.

== Biography ==
Daughter of the writer Elvira Seminara, she earned a Bachelor's in Eastern Languages (Chinese and Japanese) at the University of Turin and a Master's in East Asian Studies at the University of London. She lived in Leeds and Kyoto and is currently living in London.

Some of her works were published in Vogue, Nuovi Argomenti, La Psicoanalisi, Architectural Digest, La Stampa, and other magazines and anthologies. In 2011, her debut novel 70% Acrylic 30% Wool obtained several qualifications, including the Premio Campiello Opera Prima for its "linguistic invention pushed to the visionariness". In the same year, a theatre and music performance based on the book took place at the Festivaletteratura in Mantua, where Di Grado herself played the role of the protagonist. In 2012, after being translated into various languages, 70% Acrylic 30% Wool was included in the Marin Independent Journal′s top ten best-selling books in Marin County.

In 2013, Di Grado released her second novel, Hollow Heart. Moreover, she was granted with the Civitella Ranieri Fellowship to work on her third book, and was selected as one of the writers who opened the Vancouver Writers Fest. Di Grado was also mentioned as one of the most representative authors of the last decades in the Garzanti Dictionary 2013.

In 2015, Hollow Heart gained the first place in the Goodreads list of the most voted books for the Man Booker International Prize and in the following year it was among the finalists for several national and international awards (PEN Literary Award, IPTA Italian Prose in Translation Award, International Dublin Literary Award 2017). The novel tells the story of a 25-year-old girl after her suicide, in an attempt to pull down the barrier which separates life and death in the Western culture and "to present death not as an event, but as what it truly is: a process".

In April 2016 she published Bambini di ferro, a novel whose setting is a Japan of the near future, a world where even love and affection are no longer spontaneous and have to be artificially recreated by tailor-made machines.

In 2017 she was the only Italian author to participate in the Sydney Writers' Festival and the Auckland Festival in Australia and New Zealand.

Her novel Fuoco al cielo (March 2019) was awarded the Premio Viareggio jury's selection.

Some of Di Grado's main themes are the incommunicability, the alienation and the ego's own illusoriness, explored through a linguistic research rich in sonorities and symbolisms. In a radio interview, she claimed she wants to "forget the language", following the motto of the Chinese Taoist philosopher Zhuāngzǐ: "Language is like a fish trap. Once you've gotten the fish you can forget the trap".

She's a contributor for La Stampa and she has appeared at major festivals worldwide. Her works have been translated into over fifteen languages.

== Works ==
=== Fiction ===
• 70% Acrylic 30% Wool (Settanta acrilico trenta lana, Edizioni e/o, 2011), Europa Editions.
• Hollow Heart (Cuore cavo, Edizioni e/o, 2013), Europa Editions.
• Bambini di ferro, La nave di Teseo, 2016.
• Fuoco al cielo, La nave di Teseo, 2019.
• Blue Hunger (Fame blu, La nave di Teseo, 2022), Bloomsbury Publishing.
• Marabbecca, La nave di Teseo, 2024.
