= Rosella Postorino =

Italian author (born 1978)

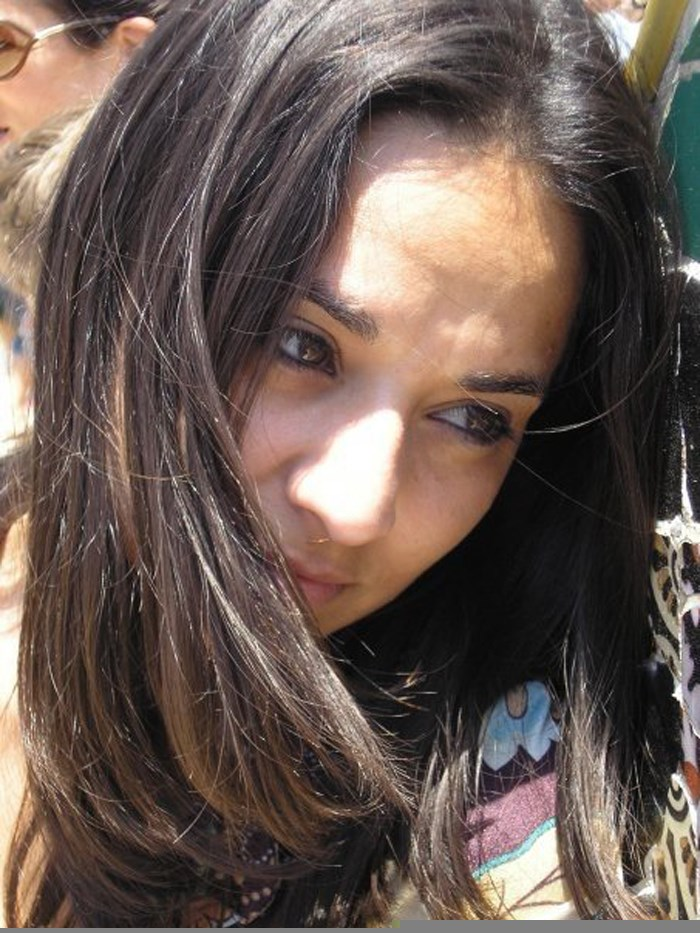
- Rosella Postorino
- Born: 1978 (age 47–48); Reggio Calabria, Italy
- Occupations: Writer and translator
- Writing career
- Language: Italian
- Years active: 2004–present
- Notable work: At the Wolf's Table

Rosella Postorino (Reggio Calabria, 1978) is an Italian author. In 2013, she won the International Prize Città di Penne, and in 2018 she won the Rapallo Carige Prize and the Premio Campiello.

== Life ==
Born in Reggio Calabria, southern Italy, in 1978, Postorino was raised in San Lorenzo al Mare, Liguria, northern Italy. In 2001 she moved to Rome.

Postorino published her first story "In una capsula" (In a Capsule) in 2004 in the anthology Ragazze che dovresti conoscere (Girls you Should Know). In 2007 she released her first novel, La stanza di sopra (The Room Upstairs).

Her 2018 novel Le assaggiatrici (At the Wolf's Table) won the 56th Campiello Prize, the Luigi Russo Prize, the Rapallo Prize and the Premio Vigevano Lucio Mastronardi.

Postorino has also translated and edited works by Marguerite Duras.

== Works ==
=== Novels ===
- La stanza di sopra, Vicenza: Neri Pozza, 2007 ISBN 978-88-545-0165-2
- L'estate che perdemmo Dio, Turin: Einaudi, 2009 ISBN 978-88-06-19625-7
- Il corpo docile, Turin: Einaudi, 2013 ISBN 978-88-06-19664-6
- Le assaggiatrici, Milan: Feltrinelli, 2018 ISBN 978-88-07-03269-1, published in English as At the Wolf's Table, trans. Leah Janeczko, New York: Flatiron books, 2019 ISBN 9781250179142.

=== Nonfiction ===
- Il mare in salita, Rome – Bari: GLF editori Laterza, 2011 ISBN 978-88-420-9682-5

=== Anthology ===
- Ragazze che dovresti conoscere, Turin: Einaudi, 2004 ISBN 88-06-17000-7
- Working for paradise, Milan: Bompiani, 2009 ISBN 978-88-452-6369-9

=== Translations ===
- Moderato cantabile of Marguerite Duras, Trieste: Nonostante, 2013 ISBN 978-88-98112-01-2
- Testi segreti di Marguerite Duras, Trieste: Nonostante, 2015 ISBN 978-88-98112-05-0

== Bibliography ==
- Anticorpi: dialoghi con Emma Dante e Rosella Postorino di Luisa Cavaliere, Napoli, Liguori, 2010 ISBN 978-88-207-5102-9
