= Gianni Granzotto =

Italian writer

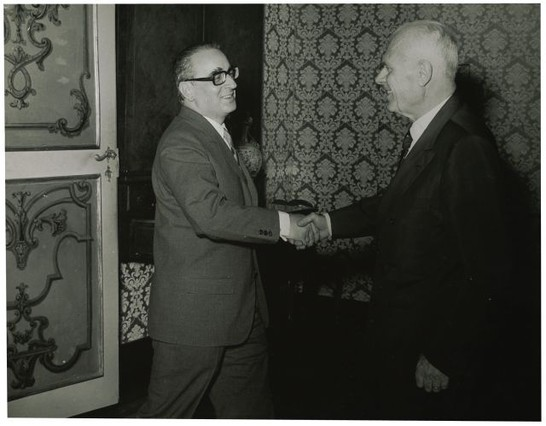
- Gianni Granzotto shaking Sandro Pertini's hand
- Born: Giovanni Granzotto; 12 January 1914; Padua, Italy
- Died: 8 March 1985 (aged 71); Rome, Italy
- Occupations: Reporter, writer

Gianni Granzotto (1914–1985) was an Italian military, writer, journalist and war correspondent. He was president of the Italian arm of Reuters between 1976 and 1985.

== Biography ==
From a Friulian family, Gianni Granzotto was born before the first World War in Padua on 12 January 1914, but spent his youth in Bologna, where he graduated in the Arts in 1936 with a thesis on Italo Svevo. In that same year, as a volunteer in Africa Orientale (what was the Italian East Africa) with the student battalion "Battaglione Universitario, Curtatone e Montanara", he took the first steps in his journalism career as a correspondent for the Turin daily newspaper Gazzetta del Popolo.

Once back in Italy, Gianni was appointed director of the Bologna magazine The Assault (founded in 1920), followed by twenty-five years at the Genoese newspaper The Work.

On the outbreak of World War II, he fulfilled his military obligations by overseeing military magazines (as Director of Foreign Translations) intended for the Albanian front (at the time an Italian colony). From this he drew experiences which would later be inspiration for his autobiography Vojussa, mia cara.

At the end of the conflict, acting as envoy to Time, for the Paris Peace Conference Gianni later remained in the French capital as a correspondent for the daily Roman newspaper as well as the weekly The Europeans and Time until 1952.

In 1953, as many Italians before and since, Gianni went to New York as a correspondent for the Italian Radio Auditions remaining there until 1955, when he was recalled to Italy to attend the working group that would give life to the new television news service, ensuring the first book review of foreign policy in Television News in the evening and then, in 1960, launching the successful broadcast program Electoral Tribune.

In 1962, Angelo Rizzoli's publishing house assigned him the task of preparing and then running a newspaper that was to be called Oggi (or Today) but which did not see the come through because, after more than three years of work and testing, Rizzoli canceled the project. Gianni then returned to the RAI, which in 1965 appointed him as CEO of Raitv and Sipra. However, when his post was to be renewed in 1969, he resigned.

In 1970, he was organizer of the Roman newspaper The Messenger and Secolo XIX. In 1972, he became President of the Federation of Newspaper Publishers (FIEG), and by 1974 he was based at Indro Montanelli and Perrone Group's Il Giornale, first as managing director and then as chairman.

Returning to his literary origins, in 1975 Gianni began to write prolifically, publishing biographies through Mondadori such as La battaglia di Lepanto (or The Battle of Lepanto) which was followed by Charles the Great, winner of the Campiello Prize, Hannibal, Maria Teresa, Maria Teresa, Christopher Columbus and the aforementioned Vojussa, mia cara.

In 1976, he was appointed president of the Italian equivalent of Reuters, the Associated Press National Agency ANSA, a position he held until 1985.

== Later years ==
By the end of his life he became incapacitated by an old disease that would lead to his eventual death in Lazio, Rome in March 1985 at the age of 71 – hepatitis – this he had contracted in Yugoslavia, where he had been sent to follow the rift between Josip Broz Tito and Joseph Stalin.

== Recognition ==
In his name the Estense Award, where Gianni served for many years as president, was established in 1985 in recognition for his "style in information".

His autobiography, however, was the most congenial of himself written and appeared in Volumes II of the traveler book published posthumously, with the title Vojussa, mia cara (or Vofussa my dear), with his collected memories of war in Albania.

== Works ==
- La battaglia di Lepanto. Milan, Mondadori, 1975
- Carlo Magno. Milan, Mondadori, 1978
- Annibale. Milan, Mondadori, 1980
- Maria Teresa, Maria Teresa. Milan, Mondadori, 1982
- Cristoforo Colombo. Milan, Mondadori, 1984
- Vojussa, mia cara. Milan, Mondadori, 1985

== Awards ==
- ANIE in 1957, the Group of manufacturers of Radio and television awarded him the "Golden Antenna"
- Premiolino in 1960 for clarity, information and the extent of his television commentaries and conducting Electoral Tribune
- Campiello Prize in 1978
- Castiglioncello Literary Prize in 1984 for Christopher Columbus.
