= Andrea Molesini =

Italian novelist

- Born: 28 December 1954 (age 71); Venice, Italy
- Occupation: Writer

Andrea Molesini (born 28 December 1954) is an Italian novelist.

Born in Venice, Molesini started his career as a translator and an author of stories for children and fables.

Also active as a poet and an essayist, his debut novel Not All Bastards Are from Vienna (Italian: Non tutti i bastardi sono di Vienna), earned him the Campiello Prize in 2010. He teaches comparative literature at the University of Padua.
