= Simona Vinci =

Italian writer (born 1970)

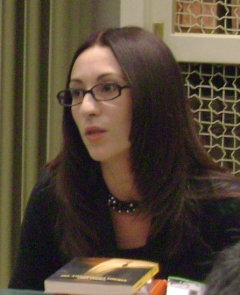
- Born: 6 March 1970 (age 56); Milan, Italy
- Education: University of Bologna
- Writing career
- Language: Italian

Simona Vinci (born 6 March 1970) is an Italian writer.

== Life ==
Vinci was born in Milan and studied modern literature at the University of Bologna. Vinci was a member of the editorial board for the online literary magazine Incubatoio 16. In 2000, she hosted the cultural television program Cenerentola.

In 1997, Vinci published the novel Dei bambini non si sa niente; in 2000, it was awarded the Elsa Morante award for best first work. It was translated into a number of different languages; its English title is A Game We Play. In Italy, the novel has been praised by some critics and condemned as perverted by others.

== Selected works ==
- In tutti i sensi come l'amore, short stories (1999), finalist for the Premio Campiello, translated into English as In Every Sense Like Love: Stories (2001)
- Corri Matilda, children's literature (1998)
- Matildacity, children's literature (1998)
- Come prima delle madri, novel (2003), finalist for the Premio Campiello
- Stanza 411, autobiographical fiction (2005)
