= Alessandro Piperno =

Italian writer

- Born: 25 March 1972 (age 54); Rome, Italy
- Occupation: Novelist
- Writing career
- Period: 2000–present
- Genres: historical, literary, criticism

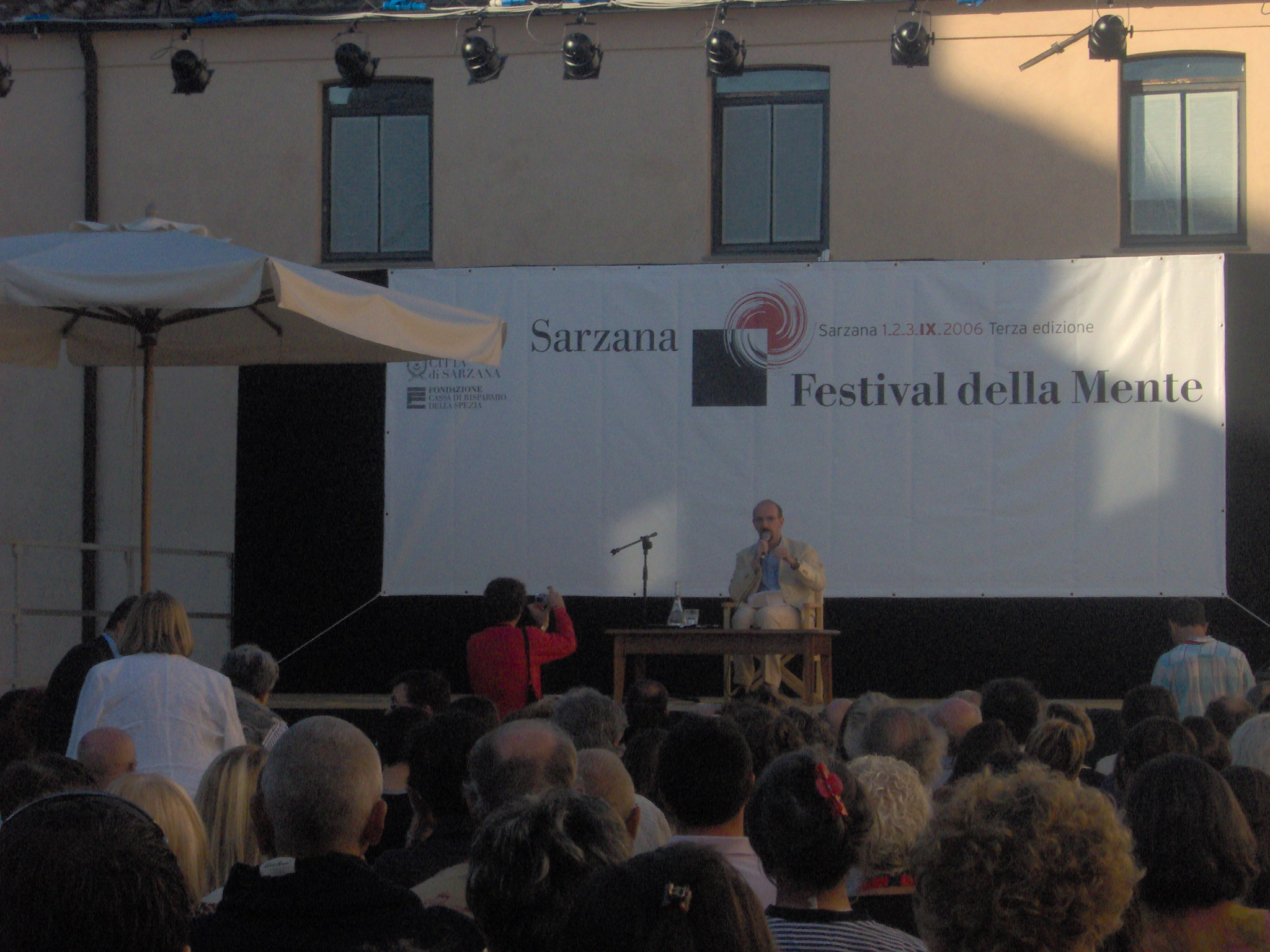

Alessandro Piperno (born 25 March 1972 in Rome) is an Italian writer and literary critic of Jewish descent, having a Jewish father and a Catholic mother.

He graduated in French Literature at the University of Rome, where he currently teaches and researches. In 2000, he published the controversial critical essay on Marcel Proust, inflammatorily entitled "Proust antiebreo (Proust, Anti-Jew)".

In 2005, he achieved notoriety with his first novel Con le peggiori intenzioni (translated as The Worst Intentions). Following general critical acclaim, and positive reviews on the Corriere della Sera (defining him the "new Proust"), his book became a bestseller in Italy (with 200,000 copies sold in a few months). For this book, he won the Premio Campiello for best first novel. The book narrates the story of the Sonnino family spanning half a century, and especially the life of its youngest member, Daniel. Piperno's book attracted noticeable interest from the media, involving Piperno in a number of TV interviews and literary debates. His writing is described both as ironic and ironically self-referential, with a disenchanted view of society and life in general. His critics have emphasised Piperno's difficult storyline and its allegedly confused narration. He states his inspiration as coming from the great literature of the 19th century, as well as that of contemporary America. Besides Proust (naturally), he's been associated with Philip Roth.

In 2012, Piperno won the Premio Strega, Italy's leading literary award, for his novel Inseparabili (2012). It traces the lives of two brothers, Philip and Samuel Pontecorvo, after the painful death of their father Leo Pontecorvo. It is a sequel to Persecuzione published in 2010.

Piperno studied guitar and has a strong interest in music. Until 2005, when he reached success as a writer, he was part of the Roman rock-blues Random as the solo guitarist and singer. He's also a fan of the soccer team Lazio.

== Bibliography ==
- Proust antiebreo (Proust, Anti-Jew), Franco Angeli Editore (Critical & Linguistic Series), 2000 ISBN 88-464-1876-X
- Con le peggiori intenzioni, Mondadori (Italian & Foreign Writers), 2005 ISBN 88-04-53802-3; Mondadori (Collana Oscar Bestseller), 2006 ISBN 88-04-55850-4
  - The Worst Intentions (Europa Editions, 2007) ISBN 978-1-933372-33-4
- Il demone reazionario. Sulle tracce del "Baudelaire" di Sartre, Gaffi Editore, (2007)
- La favola della vita vera, Corriere della Sera (Corti di Carta), short story, (2007)
- Persecuzione. Il fuoco amico dei ricordi, Mondadori, (2010)
- Contro la memoria, Roma, Fandango libri, (2012), ISBN 978-88-6044-279-6
- Inseparabili. Il fuoco amico dei ricordi, Mondadori, (2012)
- Pubblici infortuni, Mondadori, (2013) ISBN 978-88-04-62859-0
- Dove la storia finisce, Milano, Mondadori, (2016)
- Il manifesto del libero lettore: Otto scrittori di cui non so fare a meno, Mondadori, (2017)

== Excerpts ==
- "Yes, Swann tries to forget his own Judaism every so often, at least as much as Saint-Loup tries everything to let others forget he is, first of all, a Guermantes. Evidently, however, Judaism as much as aristocratic descent possess such a force that they totally overwhelm the single individual. Swann and Saint-Loup cannot do anything against chromosome enslavement. This is why Swann's face, at the end of his life, becomes as tragic and emaciated as that of Shylock, and why Saint-Loup's backside enlarges so much that it almost overlaps the similarly illustrious one of uncle Charlus."

--(transl. from "A la recherche de Proust", in The Gay Siècle, Monthly Diary, January 2006, p. 40)

- "What's the point of writing a book entitled All the Anti-Semitic Jews: From Otto Weininger to Phillip Roth, and including yourself implicitly in that rich list, when everyone knows that you are neither Jewish nor anti-Semitic but would like to be both? For the oldest reason in the world: cunning, sustained by the desire to live, to get the most out of the little life has to offer. Make it extreme. Render it attractive to others, at the cost of the deception inflicted on oneself… A half-Jew against the Jews. A half-Jew who accuses Jews of racism and a half-Catholic who accuses Catholics of ecumenism… that essay of yours is merely a grand anti-Semitic manipulation, devised to the detriment of your guiltless relatives, and to your advantage: that sense of pride that infuses you with a masochistic violence mistaken by too many for intellectual honesty."

--The Worst Intentions (2007)
