= Ermanno Rea =

Italian writer and journalist

- Born: 28 July 1927; Naples, Italy
- Died: 13 September 2016 (aged 89); Rome, Italy
- Occupation: Writer

Ermanno Rea (28 July 1927 – 13 September 2016) was an Italian novelist, essayist and journalist.

== Life and career ==
Rea was born in Naples. During World War II, he was a partisan of the Garibaldi Brigade "Gino Menconi". After the war, he started working as a journalist for a number of publications including L'Unità, Panorama, Il Giorno and Tempo Illustrato.

In 1996, Rea won the Viareggio Prize with the autobiographical novel Mistero napoletano; in 1999, he won the Campiello Prize with the novel Fuochi fiammanti a un'hora di notte. In 2008, he was a finalist for the Strega Prize with the novel Napoli ferrovia.

His 2002 novel La dismissione was adapted into a film, The Missing Star, directed by Gianni Amelio. His 2016 novel Nostalgia was adapted into the 2022 film of the same title directed by Mario Martone.

Rea died on 13 September 2016 at the age of 89.
