= Premio Napoli =

Award for Italian culture and language

- Description: Literary award for published works of poetry, fiction, and non-fiction
- Location: Naples
- Country: Italy
- Presented by: Fondazione Napoli
- First award: 1954
- Website: www.premionapoli.it

The Premio Napoli is an award for Italian culture and language, organized by the Fondazione Napoli. The award was established in 1954 and is given annually. The Foundation is headquartered at the Royal Palace in Naples.

== History ==
The Foundation, a non-profit public entity, was established as a Moral Entity by decree of the President of the Republic no. 900 of June 5, 1961: its board of directors includes the Municipality of Naples, the Province of Naples, the Campania Region, and the Chamber of Commerce of Naples.

Initially and for many years (1954–2002), the award was given to an Italian narrative work.

From 2003 to 2006, the award had four winning sections: Italian narrative, foreign narrative, international non-fiction, and poetry. For each section, a trio of winners was selected, and then a Super Winner was designated.

In 2007, the four categories and the trio-winning formula were maintained, but the final designation became Book of the Year.

From 2008 to 2011, the sections were two: Italian literature and foreign literatures.

From 2012 to 2016, the Prize was called the Premio Napoli for Italian language and culture, and it was awarded to numerous books in the first year, and later to literary personalities for their body of work.

Since 2017, there have been three sections: narrative, non-fiction, and poetry. The trios selected by the Technical Jury produce one winner each.

== Presidents ==
The following have been appointed as presidents of the Fondazione Napoli:

- Achille Lauro (1954–1955)
- Antonio Limongelli (1955–1957)
- Ernesto Pontieri (1958–1961)
- Giuseppe Tesauro (1961–1962)
- Vincenzo Maria Palmieri (1962–1965)
- Ferdinando Clemente di San Luca (1965–1980)
- Antonio Ghirelli (1980–1990)
- Sergio Zavoli (1991–2002)
- Ermanno Rea (2002–2007)
- Silvio Perrella (2007–2012)
- Gabriele Frasca (2012–2016)
- Domenico Ciruzzi (2016–2021)
- Gaetano Manfredi (2021–2023)
- Maurizio De Giovanni (from April 4, 2023, to present)

== Juries ==
Since 2003, a technical jury selects the writings for each section, which are then submitted to a popular jury. Previously, the popular jury formula was used. The technical jury consists of the current president and a panel of jurors chosen from writers, university professors, journalists, magistrates, and other personalities. The juries have an annual term.
