= Food taster =

Person ingesting food prepared for someone else to ensure it's safe to eat

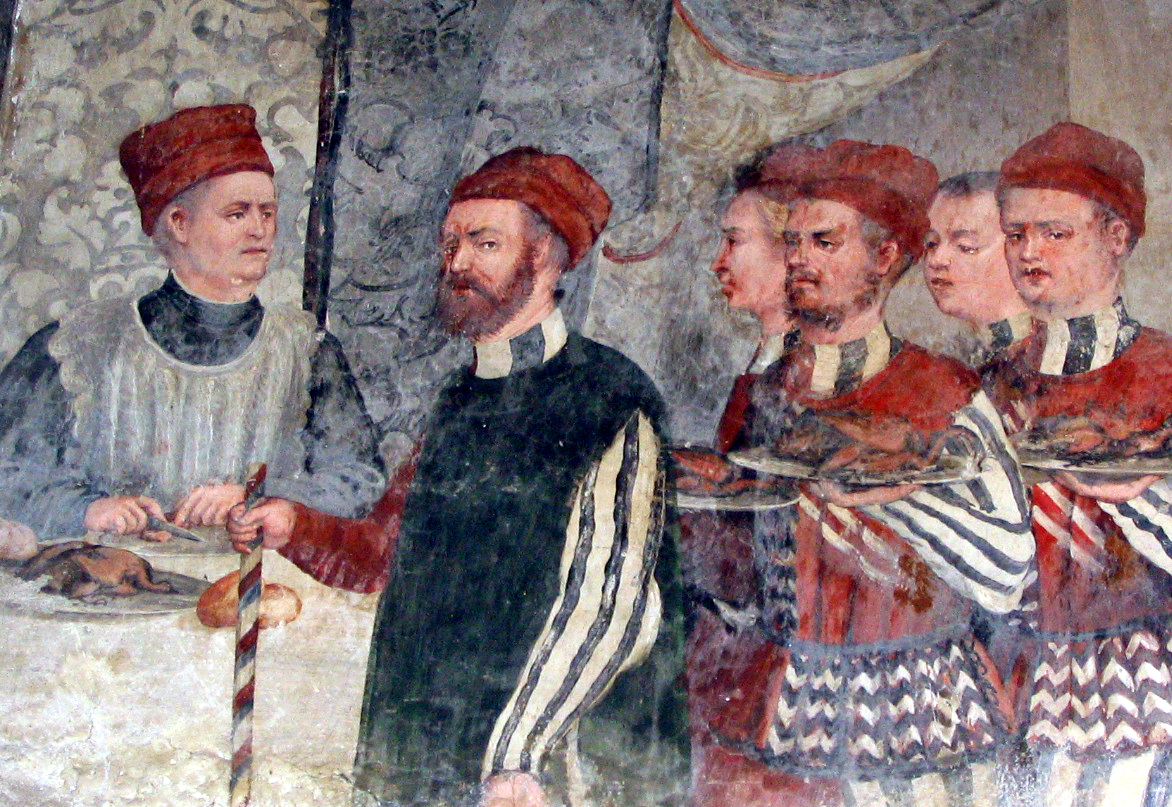
A head chef or food taster sampling dishes in Feast of Bartolomeo Colleoni in honor of Christian I of Denmark, attributed to Romanino (1467)

A food taster, also known as a poison taster, foretaster, or pregustator, is a person who ingests food that was prepared for someone else, to confirm it is safe to eat. One who tests drinks in this way is known as a cupbearer. The person to whom the food is to be served is usually an important person, such as a monarch or somebody under threat of assassination or harm.

== Role ==
Food tasters have a few functions:

- The safety of the food may be determined by observing whether or not the food taster subsequently becomes ill. However, food tasting is not effective against slow-acting poisons that take a long time to produce visible symptoms.
- The food taster may also prepare and serve food, so they can be even more diligent in preventing someone from poisoning the food.
- In the event the target falls ill or dies, the similar illness or death of the taster provides evidence of deliberate poisoning.

== Examples ==
In ancient Rome, the duty was often given to a slave (termed the praegustator). Roman Emperor Claudius was allegedly killed by poison in AD 54, even though he had a food taster named Halotus. Tasters were sometimes coerced.

Over history, presidents and royal families have hired food tasters or sacrifices, over fear of being poisoned. Queen Durdhara, the Mauryan empress, ate food that was prepared for her husband and died.

Adolf Hitler's food taster Margot Wölk tried the food at 8:00 am every day, and, if she did not fall ill, the food would be sent to Hitler's military headquarters.

President Vladimir Putin has hired a food taster who is part of his security staff to protect himself as well.

In recent times, animals such as mice have been used to detect impurities in food produced for humans, such as during the 2008 Olympic Games in China.

In the United States, a number of recent presidents, including Barack Obama, George W. Bush, Bill Clinton, George H. W. Bush, and Ronald Reagan, have been known to employ food tasters; however, their testers are privately employed, as the United States Secret Service engages in other protocols involving the testing of food which do not involve the usage of tasters.

== See also ==
- Food poisoning
- List of poisonings
