= T. Raja (social worker) =

Indian humanitarian and social worker

- Born: Thomas Raja; 1967 (age 58–59); Vaniyambadi, Tirupattur district, Tamil Nadu, India
- Other name: Auto Raja
- Occupations: Social worker, humanitarian
- Awards: 2001 Induvalu. H. Honnaiah Samaja Seva Prashasti Award; 2010 CNN-IBN Real Heroes Award; 2011 NDTV Man of The Year; 2011 Namma Bengaluru Award
- Website: official website

Thomas Raja, popularly known as Auto Raja (born 1967) is an Indian humanitarian, social worker and the founder of the New Ark Mission of India (NAMI), a non governmental organization engaged in helping the destitutes of Bengaluru, a south Indian metropolitan city. The organization houses around 750 inmates, providing them food, shelter and healthcare. Raja is a recipient of a number of awards including the NDTV Man of The Year Award, the CNN-IBN Real Heroes Award and the Namma Bengaluru Award.

== Biography ==
Thomas Raja was born in 1967 in Vaniyambadi, a village in Tirupattur district in the south Indian state of Tamil Nadu. His father, who worked as a lineman with Bharat Sanchar Nigam Limited, moved to Bengaluru with family when Raja was young. He dropped out of school at third standard and when his father kicked him out from home, went to Chennai with the money obtained by selling some goods stolen from his own home. He started drinking and gambling, slept on pavements and had to spend time in Chennai Central Prison after getting caught by the police. There, he fell ill and after recovering from the illness, he was released from jail and was taken back to Bengaluru by his family.

The life in the prison is said to have changed Raja's life who started driving an auto-rickshaw for a living. However, he continued his ruffian ways and even worked as a henchman to the secretary of the auto-rickshaw drivers' union. It was during his several trips along the Bengaluru streets that he came across the people who lived in the streets. He brought one such person, a destitute woman, home and sheltered her in the parking space of his auto-rickshaw. Later, he rented a small house and started looking after destitute people, initially with 13 inmates. Subsequently, with funds collected from the public, he bought a half-acre plot of land in Doddagubbi Village near the city, where he constructed a 2000 sq. ft building which served as the base for New Ark Mission of India, a non-governmental organization when he started it in 1997. The home, named Home of Hope, has since grown to manage one centre in Chikkagubbi village for men and two centres for women in Doddagubbi, housing around 750 inmates and also runs an ambulance service.

Raja is married and the couple has three children.

== Awards and honors ==
CNN-IBN selected Raja for the Real Heroes Award in 2010. He received the NDTV Man of The Year the next year; the same he was chosen for the Namma Bengaluru Award. A recipient of the Individual H. Honnaiah Samaja Seva Prashasti Award in 2001, Raja delivered a speech at TEDx Talks in 2012.

== See also ==
- Self Employed Women's Association
- Phoolbasan Bai Yadav
