= Mimesis =

Communication by means of imitation

Mimesis (/mɪˈmiːsɪs, maɪ-/; Ancient Greek: μίμησις, mīmēsis) is the representation of aspects of the real world, especially human actions, in literature and art. It is a concept used in philosophy, aesthetics and literary criticism, with many associated concepts, including imitatio, imitation, similarity, receptivity, representation, mimicry, the act of expression, the act of resembling, and the presentation of the self.

The original Ancient Greek term mīmēsis (μίμησις) derives from mīmeisthai (μιμεῖσθαι, 'to imitate'), itself coming from mimos (μῖμος, 'imitator, actor'). In ancient Greece, mīmēsis was an idea that governed the creation of works of art, in particular, with correspondence to the physical world understood as a model for beauty, truth, and the good. Plato contrasted mimesis, or imitation, with diegesis, or narrative. After Plato, the meaning of mimesis eventually shifted toward a specifically literary function in ancient Greek society.

One of the best-known modern studies of mimesis—understood in literature as a form of realism—is Erich Auerbach's Mimesis: The Representation of Reality in Western Literature, which opens with a comparison between the way the world is represented in Homer's Odyssey and the way it appears in the Bible.

In addition to Plato and Auerbach, mimesis has been theorised by thinkers as diverse as Aristotle, Philip Sidney, Jean Baudrillard (via his concept of Simulacra and Simulation), Gilles Deleuze (via his "event of sense" concept from The Logic of Sense), Samuel Taylor Coleridge, Adam Smith, Gabriel Tarde, Sigmund Freud, Walter Benjamin, Theodor Adorno, Paul Ricœur, Guy Debord (via his conceptual polemical tract, The Society of the Spectacle) Luce Irigaray, Jacques Derrida, René Girard, Nikolas Kompridis, Philippe Lacoue-Labarthe, Michael Taussig, Merlin Donald, Homi Bhabha, Roberto Calasso, and Nidesh Lawtoo. During the nineteenth century, the racial politics of imitation towards African Americans influenced the term mimesis and its evolution.

== Classical definitions ==
=== Plato ===
Both Plato and Aristotle saw in mimesis the representation of nature, including human nature, as reflected in the dramas of the period. Plato wrote about mimesis in both Ion and The Republic (Books II, III, and X). In Ion, he states that poetry is the art of divine madness, or inspiration. Because the poet is subject to this divine madness, instead of possessing "art" or "knowledge" (techne) of the subject, (Note: Plato, Ion, 532c) the poet does not speak truth (as characterized by Plato's account of the Forms). As Plato has it, truth is the concern of the philosopher. As culture in those days did not consist in the solitary reading of books, but in the listening to performances, the recitals of orators (and poets), or the acting out by classical actors of tragedy, Plato maintained in his critique that theatre was not sufficient in conveying the truth. (Note: Plato, Ion, 540c) He was concerned that actors or orators were thus able to persuade an audience by rhetoric rather than by telling the truth. (Note: Plato, Ion, 535b)

In Book II of The Republic, Plato describes Socrates' dialogue with his pupils. Socrates warns we should not seriously regard poetry as being capable of attaining the truth and that we who listen to poetry should be on our guard against its seductions, since the poet has no place in our idea of God. (Note: Plato, Republic, Book II, translated by B. Jowett.)

Developing upon this, in Book X, Plato told of Socrates's metaphor of the three beds: One bed exists as an idea made by God (the Platonic ideal, or form); one is made by the carpenter, in imitation of God's idea; and one is made by the artist in imitation of the carpenter's. (Note: Plato, Republic, Book X, translated by B. Jowett.)

So the artist's bed is twice removed from the truth. Those who copy only touch on a small part of things as they really are, where a bed may appear differently from various points of view, looked at obliquely or directly, or differently again in a mirror. So painters or poets, though they may paint or describe a carpenter, or any other maker of things, know nothing of the carpenter's (the craftsman's) art, and though the better painters or poets they are, the more faithfully their works of art will resemble the reality of the carpenter making a bed, the imitators will nonetheless still not attain the truth (of God's creation).

The poets, beginning with Homer, far from improving and educating humanity, do not possess the knowledge of craftsmen and are mere imitators who copy again and again images of virtue and rhapsodise about them, but never reach the truth in the way the superior philosophers do.

=== Aristotle ===
Similar to Plato's writings about mimesis, Aristotle also defined mimesis as the perfection and imitation of nature. Art is not only imitation but also the use of mathematical ideas and symmetry in the search for the perfect, the timeless, and contrasting being with becoming. Nature is full of change, decay, and cycles, but art can also search for what is everlasting and the first causes of natural phenomena. Aristotle wrote about the idea of four causes in nature. The first, the formal cause, is like a blueprint, or an immortal idea. The second cause is the material cause, or what a thing is made out of. The third cause is the efficient cause, that is, the process and the agent by which the thing is made. The fourth, the final cause, is the good, or the purpose and end of a thing, known as telos.

Aristotle's Poetics is often referred to as the counterpart to this Platonic conception of poetry. Poetics is his treatise on the subject of mimesis. Aristotle was not against literature as such; he stated that human beings are mimetic beings, feeling the urge to create texts (art) that reflect and represent reality.

Aristotle considered it important that there be a certain distance between the work of art on the one hand and life on the other; we draw knowledge and consolation from tragedies only because they do not happen to us. Without this distance, tragedy could not give rise to catharsis. However, it is equally important that the text causes the audience to identify with the characters and the events in the text, and unless this identification occurs, it does not touch us as an audience. Aristotle holds that it is through "simulated representation," mimesis, that we respond to the acting on the stage, which is conveying to us what the characters feel, so that we may empathise with them in this way through the mimetic form of dramatic roleplay. It is the task of the dramatist to produce the tragic enactment to accomplish this empathy by means of what is taking place on stage.

In short, catharsis can be achieved only if we see something that is both recognisable and distant. Aristotle argued that literature is more interesting as a means of learning than history, because history deals with specific facts that have happened, and which are contingent, whereas literature, although sometimes based on history, deals with events that could have taken place or ought to have taken place.

Aristotle thought of drama as being "an imitation of an action" and of tragedy as "falling from a higher to a lower estate" and so being removed to a less ideal situation in more tragic circumstances than before. He posited the characters in tragedy as being better than the average human being, and those of comedy as being worse.

Michael Davis, a translator and commentator of Aristotle writes:

At first glance, mimesis seems to be a stylizing of reality in which the ordinary features of our world are brought into focus by a certain exaggeration, the relationship of the imitation to the object it imitates being something like the relationship of dancing to walking. Imitation always involves selecting something from the continuum of experience, thus giving boundaries to what really has no beginning or end. Mimêsis involves a framing of reality that announces that what is contained within the frame is not simply real. Thus the more "real" the imitation the more fraudulent it becomes.

=== Contrast to diegesis ===
It was also Plato and Aristotle who contrasted mimesis with diegesis (Greek: διήγησις). Mimesis shows, rather than tells, by means of directly represented action that is enacted. Diegesis, however, is the telling of the story by a narrator; the author narrates action indirectly and describes what is in the characters' minds and emotions. The narrator may speak as a particular character or may be the "invisible narrator" or even the "all-knowing narrator" who speaks from above in the form of commenting on the action or the characters.

In Book III of his Republic (c. 373 BC), Plato examines the style of poetry (the term includes comedy, tragedy, and epic and lyric poetry): (Note: Plato, The Republic, Book III, translated by B. Jowett. (Also available via Project Gutenberg): You are aware, I suppose, that all mythology and poetry is a narration of events, either past, present, or to come? / Certainly, he replied. And narration may be either simple narration, or imitation, or a union of the two? / [...] / And this assimilation of himself to another, either by the use of voice or gesture, is the imitation of the person whose character he assumes? / Of course. / Then in this case the narrative of the poet may be said to proceed by way of imitation? / Very true. / Or, if the poet everywhere appears and never conceals himself, then again, the imitation is dropped, and his poetry becomes simple narration.) all types narrate events, he argues, but by differing means. He distinguishes between narration or report (diegesis) and imitation or representation (mimesis). Tragedy and comedy, he goes on to explain, are wholly imitative types; the dithyramb is wholly narrative; and their combination is found in epic poetry. When reporting or narrating, "the poet is speaking in his own person; he never leads us to suppose that he is anyone else;" when imitating, the poet produces an "assimilation of himself to another, either by the use of voice or gesture." (Note: Plato, 360 BC, The Republic, Book III, translated by B. Jowett. (Also available via Project Gutenberg).) In dramatic texts, the poet never speaks directly; in narrative texts, the poet speaks as himself or herself.

In his Poetics, Aristotle argues that kinds of poetry (the term includes drama, flute music, and lyre music for Aristotle) may be differentiated in three ways: according to their medium, according to their objects, and according to their mode or manner (section I); (Note: Aristotle, Poetics § I) "For the medium being the same, and the objects the same, the poet may imitate by narration—in which case he can either take another personality, as Homer does, or speak in his own person, unchanged—or he may present all his characters as living and moving before us." (Note: Aristotle, Poetics § III)

Though they conceive of mimesis in quite different ways, its relation with diegesis is identical in Plato's and Aristotle's formulations.

In ludology, mimesis is sometimes used to refer to the self-consistency of a represented world, and the availability of in-game rationalisations for elements of the gameplay. In this context, mimesis has an associated grade: highly self-consistent worlds that provide explanations for their puzzles and game mechanics are said to display a higher degree of mimesis. This usage can be traced back to the essay "Crimes Against Mimesis".

=== Dionysian imitatio ===
Dionysian imitatio is the influential literary method of imitation as formulated by Greek author Dionysius of Halicarnassus in the 1st century BC, who conceived it as technique of rhetoric: emulating, adapting, reworking, and enriching a source text by an earlier author.

Dionysius' concept marked a significant departure from the concept of mimesis formulated by Aristotle in the 4th century BC, which was only concerned with "imitation of nature" rather than the "imitation of other authors." Latin orators and rhetoricians adopted the literary method of Dionysius' imitatio and discarded Aristotle's mimesis.

== From mimesis to abstraction in art ==
The concept of mimesis, understood in painting as the accurate representation of visual perception, was the primary framework for Western visual art from the Renaissance through the development of linear perspective to create the illusion of three-dimensional space and techniques such as sfumato and chiaroscuro developed to be able to represent figures with increasing realism.

During the 18th and 19th centuries, this emphasis on physical accuracy was challenged by aesthetic theories that contrasted the sublime and the picturesque, both of which criticized the classical traditions in painting.

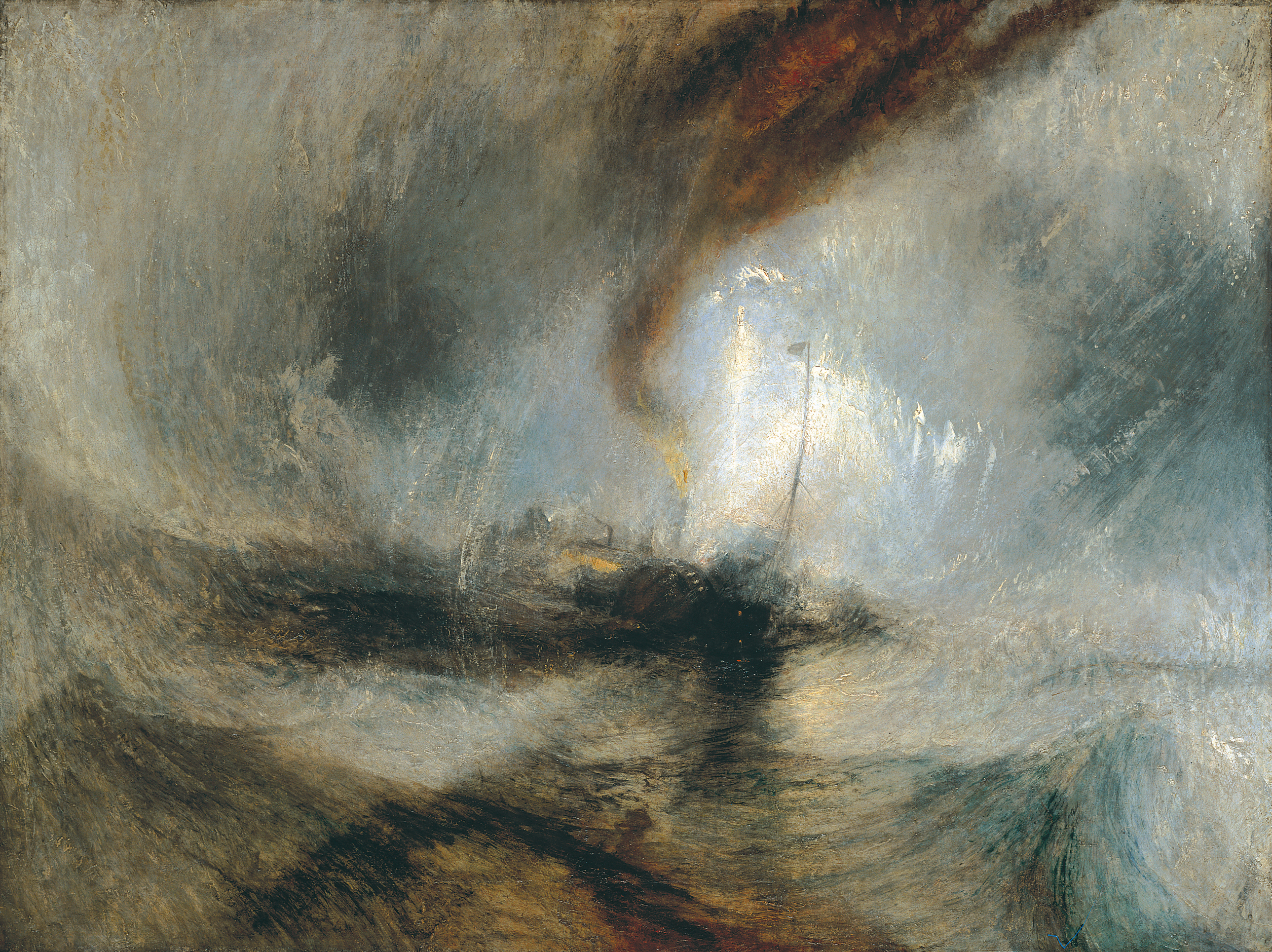
J.M.W. Turner, Snow Storm: Steam-Boat off a Harbour's Mouth (1842)

In 1757, Edmund Burke argued that a mimetic replication of nature undermined its affect, or emotional impact. For Burke, the true aim of art should be to capture the "sublime", understood as nature's capacity to generate in us deep emotions like awe and fear.

=== Turner: The turning point ===
The pioneering landscape painter J.M.W. Turner stepped up to the challenge posed by Burke. By dissolving solid forms into sweeping vortices of light and mist, Turner sought to transcend the limits of imitative representation in order to capture both the shifting ways in which the human eye perceives nature, as well as its deep emotional impact.

John Ruskin argued that since human vision naturally experiences distance, fog, and intense light as undefined shapes rather than with sharp outlines, Turner's style was a more accurate record of visual perception than a mimetic approach.

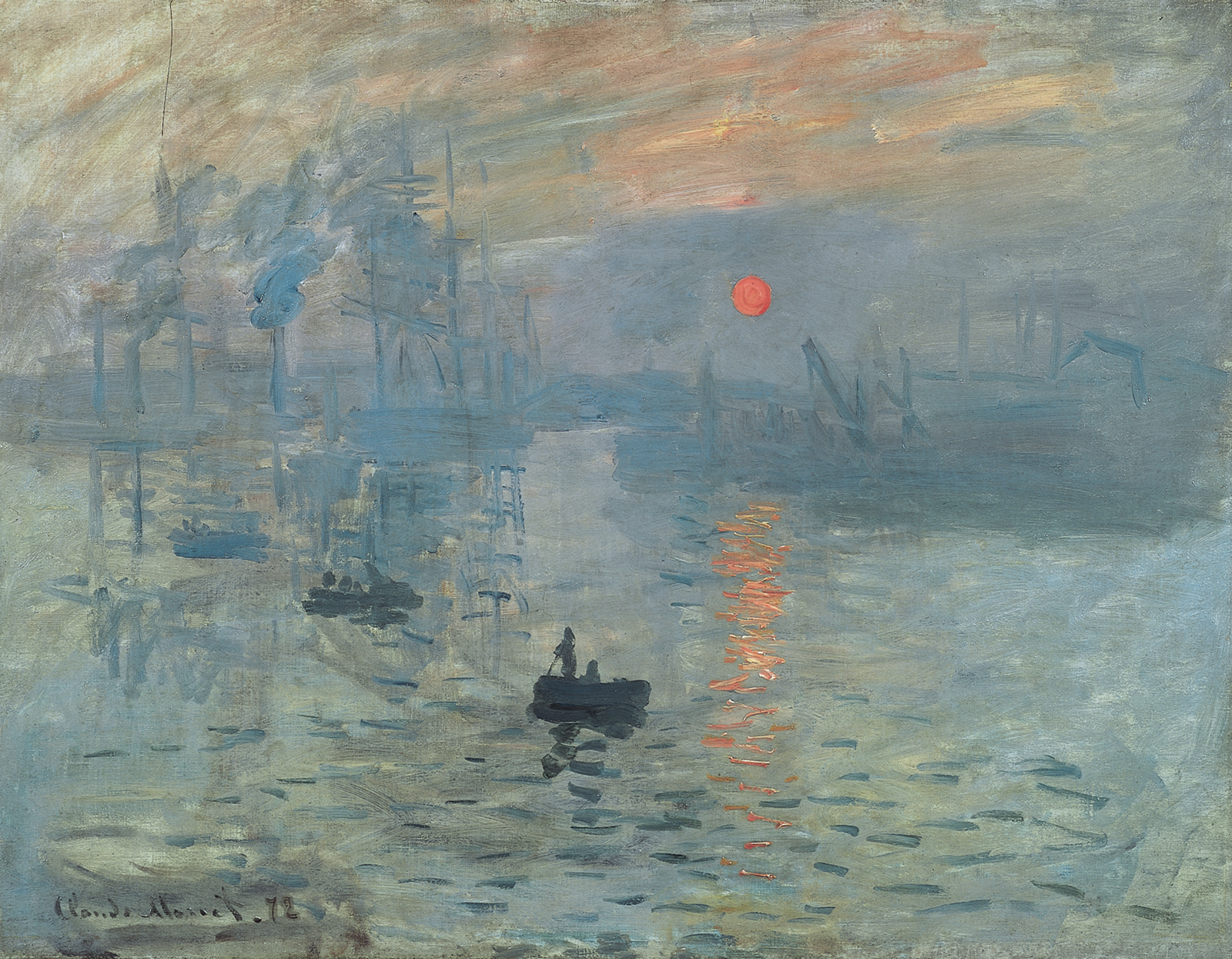
Claude Monet, Impression, Sunrise (1872). Musée Marmottan Monet, Paris.

But Ruskin went even further. For him, a truthful representation of nature had to generate the same emotions as the real experience would. In doing so, he completely reframed the definition of mimetic truth in aesthetics. This shift toward subjective perception provided the theoretical foundations of Impressionism and influenced Édouard Manet and Camille Pissarro. (Note: Claude Monet and Camille Pissarro saw Turner's paintings in 1870 and were deeply impressed. "It seems to me that we are all descended from the Englishman Turner," wrote Pissarro. "He was perhaps the first painter who knew how to make colours blaze out with their natural brilliance.)

The invention of photography provided a means of exact replication, which accelerated the transition of modern art movements toward abstraction.

== 20th Century ==
In the early 20th-century, the discourse about mimesis in art continued, and later shifted toward psychoanalysis and political resistance

=== In art ===
In the 20th century, mimesis became synonymous with realism, an attempt to picture reality in its everyday sense. A notable debate on the subject occurred between György Lukács, who argued that mimesis reveals the "truth of society" as opposed to "aristocratic tales", and Bertolt Brecht stating that the imitation of "dulled the audience's mind". Brecht recommended using shock art to promote critical thought through the estrangement effect. Post-Second World War, Erich Auerbach declared the reflection of nature "just as it is" to be the historical goal and pinnacle of artistic achievement. The ultimate mimesis in art is sometimes called verisimilitude.

=== In postcolonial theory ===
Postcolonial aspects of mimesis were developed by Michael Taussig and Homi K. Bhabha, with the latter arguing that the subaltern "camouflages" to look like the colonial masters in order to escape scrutiny while preparing for rebellion.

=== Samuel Taylor Coleridge ===
Referring to it as imitation, the concept of mimesis was crucial for Samuel Taylor Coleridge's theory of the imagination. Coleridge begins his thoughts on imitation and poetry from Plato, Aristotle, and Philip Sidney, adopting their concept of imitation of nature instead of other writers. His departure from the earlier thinkers lies in his arguing that art does not reveal a unity of essence through its ability to achieve sameness with nature. Coleridge claims:

[T]he composition of a poem is among the imitative arts; and that imitation, as opposed to copying, consists either in the interfusion of the SAME throughout the radically DIFFERENT, or the different throughout a base radically the same.

Here, Coleridge opposes imitation to copying, the latter referring to William Wordsworth's notion that poetry should duplicate nature by capturing actual speech. Coleridge instead argues that the unity of essence is revealed precisely through different materialities and media. Imitation, therefore, reveals the sameness of processes in nature.

=== Erich Auerbach ===
One of the best-known modern studies of mimesis—understood in literature as a form of realism—is Erich Auerbach's Mimesis: The Representation of Reality in Western Literature (1953), which opens with a famous comparison between the way the world is represented in Homer's Odyssey and the way it appears in the Bible. From these two seminal texts Auerbach builds the foundation for a unified theory of representation that spans the entire history of Western literature, including the Modernist novels being written at the time Auerbach began his study.

=== Walter Benjamin ===
In his essay "On The Mimetic Faculty" (1933), Walter Benjamin outlines connections between mimesis and sympathetic magic, imagining a possible origin of astrology arising from an interpretation of human birth that assumes its correspondence with the apparition of a seasonally rising constellation augurs that new life will take on aspects of the myth connected to the star.

=== Luce Irigaray ===
Belgian feminist Luce Irigaray used the term to describe a form of resistance where women imperfectly imitate stereotypes about themselves to expose and undermine such stereotypes.

=== Michael Taussig ===
In Mimesis and Alterity (1993), anthropologist Michael Taussig examines the way that people from one culture adopt another's nature and culture (the process of mimesis) at the same time as distancing themselves from it (the process of alterity). He describes how a legendary tribe, the "White Indians" (the Guna people of Panama and Colombia), have adopted in various representations figures and images reminiscent of the white people they encountered in the past (without acknowledging doing so).

Taussig, however, criticises anthropology for reducing yet another culture, that of the Guna, for having been so impressed by the exotic technologies of the whites that they raised them to the status of gods. To Taussig this reductionism is suspect, and he argues this from both sides in his Mimesis and Alterity to see values in the anthropologists' perspective while simultaneously defending the independence of a lived culture from the perspective of anthropological reductionism.

=== René Girard ===
In Things Hidden Since the Foundation of the World (1978), René Girard posits that human behavior is based upon mimesis, and that imitation can engender pointless conflict. Girard notes the productive potential of competition: "It is because of this unprecedented capacity to promote competition within limits that always remain socially, if not individually, acceptable that we have all the amazing achievements of the modern world," but states that competition stifles progress once it becomes an end in itself: "rivals are more apt to forget about whatever objects are the cause of the rivalry and instead become more fascinated with one another."

=== Roberto Calasso ===
In The Unnameable Present, Calasso outlines the way that mimesis, called "Mimickry" by Joseph Goebbels—although it is a universal human ability—was interpreted by the Third Reich as being a sort of original sin attributable to "the Jew". Thus, an objection to the tendency of human beings to mimic one another instead of "just being themselves" and a complementary, fantasized desire to achieve a return to an eternally static pattern of predation by means of "will" expressed as systematic mass-murder became the metaphysical argument (underlying circumstantial, temporally contingent arguments deployed opportunistically for propaganda purposes) for perpetrating the Holocaust among the Nazi elite. Insofar as this issue or this purpose was ever even explicitly discussed in print by Hitler's inner circle, in other words, this was the justification (appearing in the essay "Mimickry" in a war-time book published by Joseph Goebbels). The text suggests that a radical failure to understand the nature of mimesis as an innate human trait or a violent aversion to the same, tends to be a diagnostic symptom of the totalitarian or fascist character if it is not, in fact, the original unspoken occult impulse that has animated the production of totalitarian or fascist movements.

Calasso's argument here echoes, condenses, and introduces new evidence to reinforce one of the major themes of Adorno and Horkheimer's Dialectic of the Enlightenment (1944), which was itself in dialog with earlier work hinting in this direction by Walter Benjamin who died during an attempt to escape the gestapo. Calasso insinuates and references this lineage throughout the text. The work can be read as a clarification of their earlier gestures in this direction, written while the Holocaust was still unfolding.

Calasso's earlier book, The Celestial Hunter, written immediately before The Unnamable Present, is an informed and scholarly speculative cosmology depicting the possible origins and early prehistoric cultural evolution of the human mimetic faculty. In particular, the book's first and fifth chapters ("In The Time of the Great Raven" and "Sages & Predators") focus on the terrain of mimesis and its early origins, although insights on this motif permeate every other chapter of the book.

=== Nidesh Lawtoo ===
In Homo Mimeticus (2022) Swiss philosopher and critic Nidesh Lawtoo develops a relational theory of mimetic subjectivity arguing that not only desires but all affects are mimetic, for good and ill. Lawtoo opens up the transdisciplinary field of "mimetic studies" to account for the proliferation of hypermimetic affects in the digital age.

=== In artificial intelligence ===
A 2026 working paper extends the concept to generative artificial intelligence, proposing "mimetic role play" as a hypothesis linking the social speech patterns in large language model training data, reinforcement learning from human feedback, and conversational behaviour. Drawing on Girard's account of mediated desire, it argues that a synthetic speaker can act as an exemplar, evaluator or rival that shapes what users want, without itself experiencing desire, and that such a speaker can become socially consequential before questions about its consciousness are resolved.

== See also ==
- Similarity (philosophy)
- Man, Play and Games (Roger Caillois)
- Anti-mimesis
- Mimesis criticism
- Dionysian imitatio
