= Sang-sup Lee =

South Korean literary scholar (1937–2022)

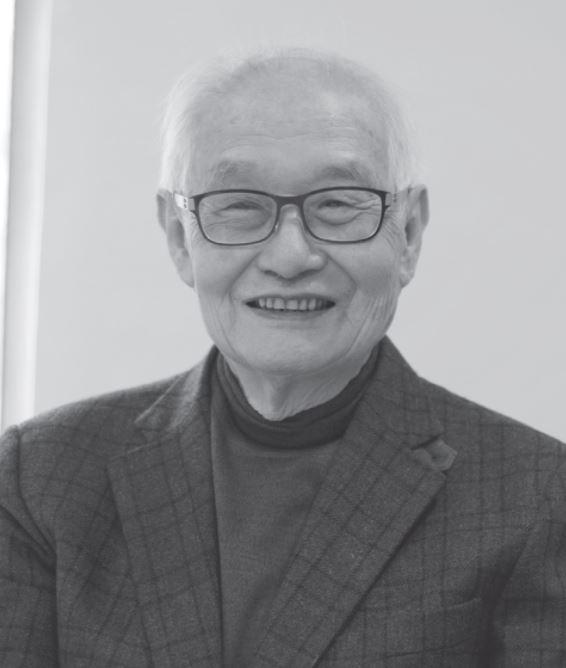
- Born: 1937; Pyongyang, Korea, Empire of Japan
- Died: August 2022 (aged 84–85); Seoul, South Korea

Academic background
- Education: Yonsei University (B.A., M.A.); Emory University (Ph.D.)

Academic work
- Discipline: English literature
- Sub-discipline: Elizabethan literature, Renaissance literature, William Shakespeare
- Main interests: Literary criticism theories, close reading, Korean corpus analysis, lexicography, Korean translation

Sang-sup Lee (Korean: 이상섭; Hanja: 李商燮; 1937 – August 2022) was a South Korean scholar of English literature, lexicographer, educationalist, and translator. He was a professor emeritus in the English Language and Literature Department at Yonsei University, who contributed to "establishing literary criticism as a systematic study of the humanities in South Korea" and implemented the concept of "corpus" in the South Korean dictionary compilation methodology. Also, Lee translated Western literary-critical terminology into appropriate Korean words, reflecting the tone and nuance of each language. For example, he rendered Viktor Shklovsky's concept of "defamiliarization" into a pure Korean expression—"낯설게 하기" ("making it unfamiliar")—without using Hanja or Chinese characters, which were often used to translate foreign literary critical terms. Given that Hanja has been incorporated into the Korean language since the Gojoseon period (400 BCE) and is still routinely used in South Korea despite the creation of Hangul (Korean alphabet; 1443), Lee's rejection of using it in his translation contributed to reviving the authentic national language of Korea.

Lee wrote and edited more than two dozen books on literary subjects, of which some representative ones are Methods of Literary Research: An Overview for Korean Application (문학연구의 방법: 그 한국적 적용을 위한 개관, 1972), Literary Criticism as Close Reading: Selected Critical Texts by Sang-sup Lee (자세히 읽기로서의 비평: 이상섭 평론집, 1988), History of British-American Criticism 1, 2, and 3 (영미 비평사 1,2,3, 1985⎼1996), and Discontents about History and Literature (역사에 대한 불만과 문학, 2002). In addition, he compiled Korean linguistic and historical corpus into several volumes of dictionaries, including Yonsei Korean Dictionary (연세 한국어사전, 1998), the first Korean dictionary made digitally, and the Yonsei Dong-A Elementary Korean Dictionary (연세 동아 초등 국어사전, 2002), the Korean dictionary for elementary school students.

Such endeavor to lay the linguistic foundation of Korean humanities beyond English literature was crucial for some of Lee's award winnings, including the 1999 Oesol Award from the Korean Association of Oesol, the 2010 Order of Cultural Merit from the Ministry of Culture, Sports and Tourism in South Korea, the 2017 Inchon Award from the Inchon Memorial Foundation, and the 2017 Yoo Yeong Translation Award for translating the Complete Works of Shakespeare for the first time in Korea.

Considering Lee's long-standing, deep interest in the language, Joon-hwan Kim, professor of English literature at Yonsei University, regards one of Lee's autobiographical phrases—"I was tied to letters"— as an expression that compresses Lee's academic achievements. Lee himself also referred to himself as "a scholar committed to the Korean alphabet" ("한글주의자"), emphasizing his great interest in linguistic theories.

== Life ==
=== Early life ===
Sang-sup Lee was born in Pyongyang, now the capital of North Korea, during the Japanese occupation in 1937. Following the emancipation of Korea in 1945, Lee's family moved to South Korea, and in 1956, Lee entered Yonsei University's Department of English Language and Literature.

Upon completing his master's degree in 1962, Lee became a faculty member at Yonsei University, but the dean strongly advised him to study for a doctoral degree in the United States. Thus, in 1964, Lee entered the Ph.D. program of Emory University, specializing in Renaissance literature. His doctoral dissertation, titled "A Study in the Varieties of Literary Opinion in the Elizabethan Age," encompassed theories about the nature of poetry, Elizabethan reactions to the problem of the use and abuse of poetry, and Elizabethan ideas concerning style and poetic rules.

=== Career ===
In 1967, Lee worked as an assistant professor at Murray State University, and in 1971, he became a full professor at Yonsei University. In 1979, Lee became the chair of the Department of English Language and Literature at Yonsei and later served as the dean of the College of Liberal Arts of the same university from August 1993 to July 1995. In 2002, Lee retired as a professor emeritus at Yonsei University.

In the meantime, he was a research fellow at Harvard University from September 1976 to June 1977, a visiting scholar at Virginia University from September 1984 to February 1985, and also at UCLA from September 1999 to February 2000.

Other career milestones of Lee include the President of the English Language and Literature Association of Korea (1997–99), the President of the Asian Association for Lexicography (1999–2001), and the Director of Yonsei University's Korean Dictionary Compilation Center (1989⎼93; 1995⎼2002).

== Work ==
=== Korean meta-criticism ===
In 1976, Sang-sup Lee compiled contemporary Western critical terms for South Korean scholars in A Glossary of Literary Criticism (문학비평용어사전). In this book, "which has been a steady seller in South Korea, Lee added his own critical and theoretical reinterpretation of each term, considering the local standpoint of the far East Asian literary culture." For instance, when he explained "rhyme", he mentioned the rhymes of Korean and Chinese poetries along with Western examples.

Other early works of Lee compare, contrast, and synthesize different criticism methodologies. One example is Method of Literary Research: An Overview for Korean Application (1972), where Lee categorized diverse critical approaches into historicism, formalism, socialism, ethicism, psychologism, and mythological criticism; and objects of literary analysis as mimesis, reader-response, expression, and structure. Lee saw the latter classification regarding literature as a "trans-historical" standard, asserting "the immutability of the system" in Historical Development of Literary Theory (문학이론의 역사적 전개, 1975).

In the mid-1980s through the 1990s, Lee published History of British-American Criticism 1,2,3 (영미비평사 1,2,3). In this series, Lee divided the discourses of literary criticism into three parts: Renaissance and Neoclassicism (1530⎼1800), British romanticism and Victorian aestheticism (1800⎼1900), and New Criticism. This diachronic trilogy is said to "have revived the various "voices" of even uncelebrated critics and writers, instead of summarizing the thoughts of few well-known ones, as Lee view[ed] criticism as 'a discussion between contemporary people rather than an expression of individual opinions.'" Lee emphasized in their prefaces that English literature study in South Korea should autonomously develop as a "South Korean" discipline that "South Koreans teach South Koreans in the Korean language."

=== New critical education ===
In the 1980s, Sang-sup Lee introduced a New Critical studying method in South Korean academia, which closely reads the literary content rather than paying much attention to its socio-historical contexts. This pedagogical style was influenced by his former career as an assistant professor at Murray State University in the 1960s. At that time, he mainly taught the course "Introduction to Literature," using An Approach to Literature (1952) as his textbook. In a 2012 interview, Lee recalled that he had found this work's text-centric questions were effective in understanding literature and that he was determined to bring it to South Korea.

Lee's acquaintance with New Criticism further influenced his critical works of the 1980s, such as History of British-American Criticism 3: New Criticism Study, the Poetics of Complexity (영미 비평사 3: 복합성의 시학, 뉴크리티시즘 연구, 1987) and Literary Criticism as Close Reading: Selected Critical Texts by Sang-sup Lee (1988). Lee adopted the methodology of New Criticism because it focuses on the "empirical reality and specific history" of the author's text rather than judging it according to other political or theoretical beliefs. In the same vein, Lee defined the purpose of critical theory as "finding the distinct voice of each literary work".

Nevertheless, Lee was more interested in the methodology of close reading as a tool for educating literature or a genuinely immersive experience to understand literature rather than agreeing with the New Critics' politico-philosophical viewpoints.

=== Korean corpus analysis ===
From the mid-1980s through the early 2000s, Sang-sup Lee's pursuit of founding a localized K-English literature study (English literature study as a "South Korean" discipline) reached into Korean literature. Specifically, Lee reevaluated two Korean poets, Yun Dong-ju and Han Yong-un, by organizing their rhetorics in the form of concordance. This text-based approach revealed how often the writers wrote a specific word in a particular context and what significant meaning those specific words produced in tandem. For example, Lee recognized for the first time that Han separately used two similar Korean words, "기룹다" [ki-lup-ta] ("miss"; "respectable"; "praiseworthy") and "그립다" [kŭ-lip-ta] ("miss"; "long for") in different parts of "The Silence of Love" (님의 沈默, 1926), one of Han's representative poetries. According to Lee, "기룹다" does not only refer to the feeling of longing but also bears a subtle hint of "admiration". However, before Lee analyzed Han's works using such a bibliographical approach, many South Korean editors arbitrarily had revised Han's "기룹다" into "그립다," a more familiar but slightly different Korean word.

Meanwhile, Lee collected the Korean corpus as the director of Yonsei University's Korean Dictionary Compilation Center from the late 1980s through the early 2000s. At that time, although decades had passed since emancipation, the history of Japanese colonization lingered in the everyday language of South Korean people. Thus, Lee compiled Korean dictionaries, including Yonsei Korean Dictionary (1998) and Yonsei Dong-A Elementary Korean Dictionary (2002), in order to facilitate the authentic Korean language culture. In the process, Lee first used the computational method in South Korea by assembling a database for dictionaries. Also, it is evaluated as the first Korean dictionary that vividly records the everyday language.

=== English-Korean translation ===
Sang-sup Lee translated the English literature of various writers, from Thomas Malory to Shakespeare, into the Korean language. In particular, Lee has focused on correcting mistranslations under the influence of the Japanese occupation. For instance, Koreans have long recited the most famous line in Shakespeare's Hamlet, "To be, or not to be," as "죽느냐 사느냐" [chuk-nŭ-nya sa-nŭ-nya] ("To live or to die"), following the Japanese translation. However, Lee points out it should be translated as "존재냐 부재냐" [chon-chae-nya pu-chae-nya] ("To subsist, or not to exist and disappear") instead because it is a line of Prince Hamlet, who studied philosophy at Wittenberg University. Further, Lee's translation is famous for its "delicately composed musicality", adjusted to the pitches of the Korean language "while preserving the rhymes of English." One example is his 2016 translation of Shakespeare's Measure for Measures. This problem play was introduced to Koreans under the Japanese title, "이척보척" [i-ch'ŏk-po-ch'ŏk] (以尺報尺), whose meaning is difficult for most Koreans to understand, and which has a different rhyme from the original, and does not convey the biblical connotation. Hence, Lee translated it as "눈은 눈으로, 이는 이로" [nun-ŭn nun-ŭ-lo, i-nŭn i-lo] ("An Eye for an Eye; a Tooth for a Tooth") to preserve the rhythmic nuance of Shakespeare's words while using the familiar Korean language. In the most recent interview in 2017, Lee said he wants to be remembered as a translator of Shakespeare above anything else.

== Criticism ==
Sang-sup Lee "distanced himself from all beliefs", neither praising nor disparaging a specific Western critical theory. This sense of balance, which was noticeable during his early and mid-term career as a scholar, sometimes became the target of criticism. For example, Gyung-ryul Jang, professor emeritus in the English Language and Literature Department at Seoul National University, pointed out that Lee's History of British-American Criticism 1, 2, and 3 failed to reveal his independent perspective sufficiently while excessively avoiding the risk of "arbitrary generalization".

== Major publications ==
=== Authored books ===
- Lee, Sang-sup. Understanding Literature. Seoul: Seomundang, 1972. [이상섭. 『문학의 이해』. 서울: 서문당, 1972.]
- Lee, Sang-sup. Method in Literary Research. Seoul: Tamgudang, 1972. [이상섭. 『문학 연구의 방법』. 서울: 탐구당, 1972.]
- Lee, Sang-sup. A History of Literary Theory. Seoul: Yonsei UP, 1975. [이상섭. 『문학이론의 역사적 전개』. 서울: 연세대학교, 1975.]
- Lee, Sang-sup. The Law of Words. Seoul: Minumsa, 1976. [이상섭. 『말의 질서』. 서울: 민음사, 1976.]
- Lee, Sang-sup. A Glossary of Literary Criticism. Seoul: Minumsa, 1976. [이상섭. 『문학비평용어사전』. 서울: 민음사, 1976.]
- Lee, Sang-sup. Language and Imagination: Literature Theory and Critical Texts. Seoul: Moonji Publishing, 1980. [이상섭. 『언어와 상상: 문학이론과 실제비평』. 서울: 문학과지성사, 1980.]
- Lee, Sang-sup. Vocabulary Structure of "The Silence of Love." Seoul: Tamgudang, 1984. [이상섭. 『"님의 침묵"의 어휘와 그 활용 구조』. 서울: 탐구당, 1984.]
- Lee, Sang-sup. History of British-American Criticism 1: The Renaissance and Neoclassical Criticism 1530⎼1800. Seoul: Minumsa, 1985. [이상섭. 『영미 비평사 1: 르네상스와 신고전주의 비평 1530~1800』. 서울: 민음사, 1985.]
- Lee, Sang-sup. Literature Education in Universities. Seoul: Goryeowon, 1985. [이상섭. 『대학문학 교육론』. 서울: 고려원, 1985.]
- Lee, Sang-sup. History of British-American Criticism 3: New Criticism Study, the Poetics of Complexity. Seoul: Minumsa, 1987. [이상섭. 『영미 비평사 3: 복합성의 시학, 뉴크리티시즘 연구』. 서울: 민음사, 1987.]
- Lee, Sang-sup. Close Reading: Selected Critical Texts by Sang-sup Lee. Seoul: Moonji Publishing, 1988. [이상섭. 『자세히 읽기로서의 비평』. 서울: 문학과지성사, 1988.]
- Lee Sang-sup. History of British-American Criticism 2: From Romanticism to Aestheticism 1800⎼1900. Seoul: Minumsa, 1996. [이상섭. 『영미 비평사 2: 낭만주의에서 심미주의까지 1800~1900』. 서울: 민음사, 1996.]
- Lee, Sang-sup. Selected Anti-Essays of Sang-sup Lee. Seoul: Cheong A Publishing Co., 2000. [이상섭. 『이상섭 안티에세이 모음』. 서울: 청아출판사, 2000.]
- Lee, Sang-sup. Literature, History, and Society. Seoul: Hankook Munhwasa, 2001. [이상섭. 『문학·역사·사회』. 서울: 한국문화사, 2001.]
- Lee, Sang-sup. A Study on Aristotle's Poetics. Seoul: Moonji Publishing, 2002. [이상섭. 『아리스토텔레스의 <시학> 연구』. 서울: 문학과지성사, 2002.]
- Lee, Sang-sup. Discontents about History and Literature. Seoul: Munhakdongne, 2002. [이상섭. 『역사에 대한 불만과 문학』. 서울: 문학동네, 2002.]
- Lee, Sang-sup. A Close Reading on Yun Dong-ju. Seoul: Hankook Munhwasa, 2007. [이상섭. 『윤동주 자세히 읽기』. 서울: 한국문화사, 2007.]

=== Edited books ===
- Selected English Critical Texts with Excerpts from Classical Criticism. Ed. Sang-sup Lee. Seoul: Shinasa, 1982.
- Yonsei Institute of Language and Information Studies. Lexicography Studies, Vol. 1⎼10. Ed. Sang-sup Lee. Seoul: Yonsei UP, 1988⎼2001. [연세대학교 언어정보연구원. 『사전편찬학연구』 1~10. 이상섭 등 편저. 서울: 연세대학교, 1988~2001.]
- Yonsei Institute of Language and Information Studies. Yonsei Korean Dictionary. Ed. Sang-sup Lee et al. Seoul: Yonsei UP, 1998. [연세대학교 언어정보연구원. 『연세 한국어사전』. 이상섭 등 편저. 서울: 연세대학교, 1998.]
- Yonsei Institute of Language and Information Studies. Yonsei Dong-A Elementary Korean Dictionary. Ed. Sang-sup Lee et al. Seoul: Yonsei UP, 2002. [연세대학교 언어정보연구원. 『연세 동아 초등 국어사전』. 이상섭 등 편저. 서울: 연세대학교, 2002.]

=== Translations ===
- Brewster Ghiselin. The Creative Process: A Symposium. Trans. Sang-sup Lee. Seoul: Yonsei UP, 1964. [브루스터 기셀린. 『예술 창조의 과정』. 이상섭 역. 서울: 연세대학교, 1964.]
- Dylan Thomas. Poem in October: Selected Poems of Dylan Thomas. Trans. Sang-sup Lee. Seoul: Minumsa, 1975. [딜런 토머스. 『시월의 시: 딜런 토머스 시 선집』. 이상섭 역. 서울: 민음사, 1975.]
- Alfred Lord Tennyson. Lyrical Ballads. Trans. Sang-sup Lee. Seoul: Minumsa, 1975. [알프레드 로드 테니슨. 『서정시집』. 이상섭 역. 서울: 민음사, 1975.]
- Saavedra, Miguel de Cervantes. Don Quijote de La Mancha, Vol 1,2. Trans. Sang-sup Lee. Seoul: Samsung Publishing, 1984. [미겔 데 세르반테스. 『동 끼호테』 1·2. 이상섭 역. 서울: 삼성, 1984.]
- Owen, Wilfred. Complete Works of Owen. Trans. Sang-sup Lee. Seoul: Hyewon, 1987. [윌프레드 오웬. 『오웬 전집』. 이상섭 역. 서울: 혜원, 1987.]
- Shakespeare, William. Sonnets of Shakespeare. Trans. Sang-sup Lee. Seoul: Hyewon, 1888. [윌리엄 셰익스피어. 『셰익스피어』. 이상섭 역. 서울: 혜원, 1988.; 『소네트집』 (2001)]
- Aristotle. Poetics. Trans. Sang-sup Lee. Seoul: Moonji Publishing, 2005. [아리스토텔레스. 『시학』. 이상섭 역. 서울: 문학과지성사, 2005.]
- Shakespeare, William. Shakespeare's Romance Plays. Trans. Sang-sup Lee. Seoul: Moonji Publishing, 2008. [윌리엄 셰익스피어. 『셰익스피어 로맨스 희곡 전집』. 이상섭 역. 서울: 문학과지성사, 2008.]
- Shakespeare, William. Complete Works of Shakespeare. Trans. Sang-sup Lee. Seoul: Moonji Publishing, 2016. [윌리엄 셰익스피어. 『셰익스피어 전집』. 이상섭 역. 서울: 문학과지성사, 2016.]

== See also ==
- New Criticism
- Close reading
- Reader-response theory
- Corpus Linguistics
