= Mimesis criticism =

Method of interpreting texts

Mimesis criticism is a method of interpreting texts in relation to their literary or cultural models. Mimesis, or imitation (imitatio), was a widely used rhetorical tool in antiquity up until the 18th century's romantic emphasis on originality. Mimesis criticism looks to identify intertextual relationships between two texts that go beyond simple echoes, allusions, citations, or redactions. The effects of imitation are usually manifested in the later text by means of distinct characterization, motifs, and/or plot structure.

As a critical method, mimesis criticism has been pioneered by Dennis MacDonald, especially in relation to New Testament and other early Christian narratives imitating the "canonical" works of Classical Greek literature.

== History ==
=== Aristotle ===
Greek rhetorician Aristotle (4th century BCE) discusses the rhetorical technique of mimesis or imitation; what Aristotle describes, however, is the author's imitation of nature, not earlier literary or cultural models.

=== Philodemus ===
Philodemus of Gadara (1st century BCE), an Epicurean philosopher and poet and one of Virgil's teachers, affirms that writers of prose histories and fictions used literary models. He writes (rhetorically) in book five of On Poetry, "Who would claim that the writing of prose is not reliant on the Homeric poems?" (5.30.36–31.)

=== Dionysius of Halicarnassus ===
A Greek historian and rhetorician from the late first century BCE/early first century CE, Dionysius of Halicarnassus represents a change from the Aristotelian rhetorical notion of mimesis, from imitation of nature's to imitation of literature. His most important work in this respect, On Mimesis (Περὶ μιμήσεως, Perì mimēseōs), survives only in fragments. Apparently, most of this work concerned the proper selection of literary models.

=== Quintilian ===
Roman rhetorician M. Fabius Quintilianus published his twelve-volume Institutio oratoria around 95 CE. In book 10, Quintilian—who was well-read with respect to both Greek and Latin rhetoricians, including Dionysius—gives advice to teachers who are instructing students in oration. He tells them that, by the time students begin composition, they should be so well-versed in exemplary models that are able to imitate them without physically consulting them (10.1.5). Quintilian writes,

For in everything which we teach examples are more effective even than the rules which are taught in the schools, so long as the student has reached a stage when he can appreciate such examples without the assistance of a teacher, and can rely on his own powers to imitate them. (10.1.15; Butler, LCL)

He also advises that students constantly reread the exemplary models (10.1.19), not only in sections but all the way through (10.1.20), so that they might be empowered to imitate these models with more craft and subtlety.

Of course, the selection of one's literary model is of the utmost importance. In Quintilian's opinion, one could find no better model than Homer, "for he has given us a model and an inspiration for very department of eloquence" (10.1.46; Butler, LCL). When it comes to the act of imitation itself, he writes,

There can be no doubt that in art no small portion of our task lies in imitation, since, although invention came first and is all-important, it is expedient to imitate whatever has been invented with success. And it is a universal rule of life that we should wish to copy what we approve in others. It is for this reason that boys copy the shapes of letters that they may learn to write, and that musicians take the voices of their teachers, painters the works of their predecessors, and peasants the principles of agriculture which have been proved in practice, as models for their imitation. In fact, we may note that the elementary study of every branch of learning is directed by reference to some definite standard that is placed before the learner. (10.2.1–2; Butler, LCL)

Furthermore, students are encouraged to improve upon their chosen models (10.2.12). One way for students to accomplish this task, Quintilian says, is to imitate several models in eclectic fashion: "We shall do well to keep a number of different excellences before our eyes, so that different qualities from different authors may impose themselves on our minds, to be adopted for use in the place that becomes them best" (10.2.26; Butler, LCL). On this point, Quintilian was at odds with Cicero, who felt it best for authors to imitate a single author.

== Criteria ==
In order to circumvent the capriciousness of subjectivity, MacDonald suggests six criteria for determining whether a claim for a mimetic connection between texts is reasonable: accessibility, analogy, density, order, distinctive traits, and interpretability. The first two criteria concern the status of the text used as a model ("ante-text"); the final four concern the later text that may have used the antetext.

- Accessibility: One must demonstrate that the author of the later text would have been reasonably able to access a copy of the text being imitated. Was the antetext well known or obscure at the time of the later text's composition?
- Analogy: If one text is discovered to imitate a certain antetext, it is probable that other texts have also done so. Are there examples of other authors using this antetext as a literary model?
- Density: The greater number of parallels one can induce between the two texts, the stronger one's case will be for a mimetic relationship between them.
- Order: The more frequently the parallels between the two texts follow the same order, the less likely it becomes that the parallels are just coincidental.
- Distinctive Traits: If there are parallels between two texts, but none of the parallels are anything but one would expect in their respective contexts, then it becomes difficult to argue for a mimetic connection. Especially helpful are non sequiturs or other unusual elements present in the later text which parallel the proposed model. It is also typical for authors to use significant names to alert the reader to the textual interplay.
- Interpretability: A common motivation for imitating an earlier text is to rival that text, whether philosophically, theologically, politically, or otherwise. If one can determine such a motivation in a compelling fashion, then there is a stronger case for imitation.

== Mimesis in Early Christianity ==
=== New Testament ===
Two examples of imitation within the New Testament will be outlined. The first pertains to Luke's use of 1 Kings 17 as a literary model. The second outlines Luke's imitation of Homer's Odyssey 10–12 in Acts 20.

1 Kings 17:9–24	Luke 7:11–16
Elijah went to Sarepta.	Jesus went to Nain.
Elijah saw a widow after approaching the city gate. Her son later becomes sick and dies.	Jesus saw a widow's dead son after approaching the city gate being carried out on a bier.
Elijah told the widow, "Give me your son."	Jesus told the widow, "Do not weep."
Elijah took the corpse and cried out angrily to God.	Jesus took the corpse and spoke directly to him.
The dead son revived and cried out (lxx).	The dead son sat up and began to speak.
"And he gave him to his mother."	"And he gave him to his mother."
The widow praised Elijah as "a man of God."	The crowd glorified God, calling Jesus "a great prophet."

One can justifiably argue that Luke used 1 Kings 17:9–24 as a model for Luke 7:11–16 because it meets the criteria of mimesis criticism. Criterion 1 (Accessibility): Luke cites this very story in Luke 4:25–26. Criterion 2 (Analogy): Mark provides an analogous imitation of 1 Kings 17 with his story about the raising of Jairus' daughter (Mark 5:35–43). Criteria 3 (Density), 4 (Order), and 5 (Distinctive Traits) can be identified in the above table. The most important aspect for criterion 5 is the identical Greek wording for "And he gave him to his mother." Criterion 6 (Interpretability): Luke improves upon his model in the following ways. In 1 Kings, the widow initiates the miracle by castigating Elijah for causing her son's death; in Luke, Jesus is the one to initiate the miracle. In 1 Kings, Elijah then reproaches God, asking if God has "brought calamity even upon the widow with whom I am staying, by killing her son" (17:20); in Luke, Jesus does not blame God for the boy's death but instead has compassion for her. In 1 Kings, it is the Lord who raises the boy, not Elijah; in Luke, it is Jesus himself. In 1 Kings, only the widow responds to the miracle; in Luke, a "large crowd" responds positively.

Odyssey 10–12	Acts 20:5–12
Odysseus and his crew left Troy and sailed back to Achaea.	Paul and his crew arrive at Troas en route to Jerusalem from Achaea.
The account is narrated in the first-person plural.	The account is narrated in the first-person plural.
After a sojourn, Odysseus and his crew ate a meal.	After a sojourn, Paul and the believers there ate a meal.
Disaster came at night.	Disaster came at midnight.
The crew slept in Circe's "darkened halls."	"There were many lamps in the room upstairs where they were meeting."
The narrator switches to the third person.	The narrator switches to the third person.
"There was a man, Elpenor, the youngest..."	"A young man named Eutychus, who was sitting in the window."
Elpenor fell into "sweet sleep."	Eutychus fell into a "deep sleep."
"[He] fell down from the roof. His neck / broke from the spine, and his soul went down to the house of Hades."	"He fell to the ground three floors below and was picked up dead. But Paul went down,...and said, 'Do not be alarmed, for his soul is in him.'"
Associates fetched the body, dead.	Associates took up the body, alive.
Elpenor was not buried until dawn.	Eutychus was not raised alive until dawn.

In the same way, one can justifiably argue that Luke has used the story of Elpenor from Odyssey 10–12 as a model for his account of Eutychus in Acts 20:5–12 using the criteria. Criterion 1 (Accessibility): Books 10–12 of Odyssey were among the most popular in antiquity. Criterion 2 (Analogy): Among the many imitations of these books in antiquity, Virgil's Aeneid contains two, the stories about Palinurus and Misenus. Criteria 3 (Density), 4 (Order), and 5 (Distinctive Traits) can be seen to be met by referring to the above table. Of particular significance is Luke's name choice: Homer often called Elpenor "unlucky" (Odyssey 11.61, 76, 80); Luke's Eutychus literally means "good fortune." Furthermore, the raising of Luke's Eutychus occurs in the Troad, the site of the Trojan War. Criterion 6 (Interpretability): Luke emulates Homer in the following ways. Elpenor fell to his death because he was in a drunken stupor; Eutychus appeared to die after falling asleep (out a window) while listening to Paul preach deep into the night. Odysseus was unaware of Elpenor's misfortune; Paul knew immediately about Eutychus' fall and also that "his soul [was] still in him." Later in Homer's story, Elpenor's body was buried at dawn; at dawn, the other believers lifted up Eutychus alive.

In addition to imitating the Septuagint and Homer's Odyssey, MacDonald proposes that Mark's Gospel and Luke-Acts used the following literary models: Homer's Iliad, several Homeric Hymns, Euripides' Bacchae and Madness of Heracles, and dialogues by Plato and Xenophon about Socrates.

=== Christian Apocrypha ===
In his seminal work Christianizing Homer: The Odyssey, Plato, and The Acts of Andrew, MacDonald argues that the second-century CE apocryphal work, the Acts of Andrew, was a Christian version of Homer's Iliad. Elsewhere, MacDonald has also argued for the presence of Homeric imitations in the Acts of Peter, another second-century CE apocryphal work.

== Reception ==
=== Scholarly Opposition ===
Karl Olav Sandnes, the most vocal of MacDonald's critics, objects that MacDonald's "reading of both Mark's Gospel and Acts assumes a readership with an in-depth as well as extensive familiarity with the Homeric epics. This implies that the curriculum of encyclical studies had penetrated into the Christian movement to an extent which the present study has not confirmed. Ancient education was designed for the upper strata of the population." Thus, Sandnes argues deductively: Since such familiarity with Homer was limited to the upper stratum of society, and since the authors of Mark and Luke-Acts (nor their audiences) are not believed to belong to this stratum, then the authors of Mark and Luke-Acts simply could not have imitated Homer in the way MacDonald suggests.

MacDonald's response has been threefold. First, a more sure decision about the education of the authors of Mark and Luke-Acts would result from an inductive approach to the question, rather than Sandnes' deductive approach. Second, access to Homer was not restricted to the cultural elite. According to a first-century CE writer, "From the earliest age, children beginning their studies are nursed on Homer's teaching. One might say that while we were still in swathing bands we sucked from his epics as from fresh milk. He assists the beginner and later the adult in his prime. In no stage of life, from boyhood to old age, do we ever cease to drink from him." Finally, MacDonald notes that Sandnes does not offer any other explanation for the parallels between the New Testament writings and Homer.

Margaret M. Mitchell has also published a critical response to MacDonald's work on Homeric imitation within the New Testament. MacDonald addresses Mitchell's critiques, as well as earlier criticism from Sandnes, in an article titled, "My Turn: A Critique of Critics of 'Mimesis Criticism'".

=== Implications for the Historicity of Jesus ===
Despite his stance that the Gospels and Acts of the Apostles, including the narratives about Jesus, were influenced by Homeric literature, MacDonald himself holds to a minimalist view of the Historical Jesus.

== See also ==
- Dionysian imitatio
- Homeric and Virgilian Centos
