= Dennis MacDonald =

American theologian and professor (born 1946)

Dennis Ronald MacDonald
- Born: 1946 (age 79–80)
- Known for: Idea that the New Testament were responses to the Homeric Epics
- Title: John Wesley Professor of New Testament and Christian Origins

Academic background
- Education: Bob Jones University, McCormick Theological Seminary
- Alma mater: Harvard University
- Thesis: (1978)

Academic work
- Discipline: Biblical studies
- Sub-discipline: New Testament studies
- Institutions: Claremont School of Theology

Dennis Ronald MacDonald (born 1946) is the John Wesley Professor of New Testament and Christian Origins at the Claremont School of Theology in California. MacDonald proposes a theory wherein the earliest books of the New Testament, including the Gospel of Mark and the Acts of the Apostles, were responses to the Homeric epics. The methodology he pioneered is called mimesis criticism. If his theories are correct then "nearly everything written on [the] early Christian narrative is flawed." According to him, modern biblical scholarship has failed to recognize the impact of Homeric Poetry.

The other major branch of MacDonald's scholarly activity is his contribution to the Synoptic Problem. He calls his solution the Q+/Papias hypothesis.

== Background ==
MacDonald earned his undergraduate degree from Bob Jones University, a Master of Divinity from McCormick Theological Seminary, and a Ph.D. from Harvard University. He taught Theology and Biblical Studies at the Iliff School of Theology in Denver, Colorado, from 1980 to 1998. Since 1998 to present he has been the John Wesley Professor of New Testament at the Claremont School of Theology and Professor of Religion at the Claremont Graduate University. He also is the director of the Institute for Antiquity and Christianity at Claremont.

== Christianizing Homer ==
In one of MacDonald's first books, Christianizing Homer: The Odyssey, Plato, and the Acts of Andrew, he posited the theory that the apocryphal Acts of Andrew was a Christian retelling of Homer's Iliad. In it he argued that one could detect trends that showed parallels between the Homeric epic and the Acts of Andrew. He argued that the Acts of Andrew is better understood in light of the Odyssey. That the order of events in the Acts follows those found in the Acts of Andrew, that certain events in the Acts are better understood when understood in context of the Homeric epics, and that the Homeric texts commonly were available during the first century AD. In subsequent works, MacDonald expanded his hypothesis to include the Acts of the Apostles and the Gospel of Mark as being Christian variations of the Homeric epics.

In Christianizing Homer, MacDonald lays down his principles of literary mimesis, his methodology for comparing ancient texts. There are six aspects he examines 1) accessibility, 2) analogy, 3) density, 4) order, 5) distinctive traits, and 6) interpretability. According to his hypothesis, not only was Homer readily available to the authors of the New Testament, but the Homeric epics would have been the basic texts upon which the New Testament authors learned to write Greek. MacDonald also argues that the number of common traits, the order in which they occur, and the distinctiveness thereof between the Homeric Texts and early Christian documents help to show that the New Testament writers were using Homeric models when writing various books.

In his earliest reviews, MacDonald only applied his hypothesis to works such as Tobit and the Acts of Peter. In later works, he posits the Acts of the Apostles, the Gospel of Mark, and Gospel of Luke merged two cultural classics of his time period in order to "depict Jesus as more compassionate, powerful, noble, and inured to suffering than Odysseus."

== Homeric epics and the Gospel of Mark ==
MacDonald's most famous work, however, is The Homeric Epics and the Gospel of Mark. According to MacDonald, the Gospel of Mark is "a deliberate and conscious anti-epic, an inversion of the Greek 'Bible' of Homer's Iliad and Odyssey, which in a sense updates and Judaizes the outdated heroic values presented by Homer, in the figure of a new hero."

The book begins by examining the role that the Homeric epics played in antiquity—namely that anybody who was considered educated at the time learned to read and write, and they did so by studying the Odyssey and Iliad. Students were expected, not only to understand the epics, but be able to rewrite the stories in their own words. Rewriting the Homeric epics was commonplace and accepted in biblical times.

In using the Homeric epics, the ancient writers were not trying to deceive their readers; in fact MacDonald believes the ancient readers understood the juxtapositions of Jesus with Odysseus. "Mark's purpose", he argues, "in creating so many stories about Jesus was to demonstrate how superior [Jesus] was to Greek heroes. Few readers of Mark fail to see how he portrays Jesus as superior to Jewish worthies... He does the same for Greek heroes."

MacDonald's thesis has not found acceptance and has received strong criticism by other scholars. Karl Olav Sandnes notes the vague nature of alleged parallels as the "Achilles' heel" of the "slippery" project. He has also questioned the nature of the alleged paralleled motifs, seeing MacDonald's interpretations of common motives. He states, "His [MacDonald's] reading is fascinating and contributes to a reader-orientated exegesis. But he fails to demonstrate authorial intention while he, in fact, neglects the OT intertextuality that is broadcast in this literature."

Daniel Gullotta from Stanford similarly writes "MacDonald's list of unconvincing comparisons goes on and has been noted by numerous critics. Despite MacDonald's worthy call for scholars to reexamine the educational practices of the ancient world, all of the evidence renders his position of Homeric influential dominance untenable."

Adam Winn, though adopting MacDonald's methods of mimetic criticism, concluded after a detailed analysis of MacDonald's theses and comparisons between Homer and Mark that "MacDonald is unable to provide a single example of clear and obvious Markan interpretation of Homer... because MacDonald's evidence is at best suggestive, it will ultimately convince few."

Kristian Larsson discusses the concept of intertextual density and its application in what MacDonald views as one of the most convincing cases of Markan imitation, namely the Cyclops – Circe complex in Odyssey 9-10 and the Gerasene demoniac story in Mark 5.

David Litwa argues that problematic parts of MacDonald's thesis include that he construes both large ranges of similarity in addition to large range of difference as evidence for parallel, that he alters his parallels in order to make them more convincing like suggesting that Jesus walking on water is comparable to Athena and Hermes flying above water, that he has an inconsistent application of his own six criteria (where he often uses only one or two to establish parallel and thus relies largely on loose structural standards of similarity), and that he often has completely unconvincing parallels such as his comparison of Odysseus on a floating island to Jesus sitting in a boat that floats on water.

== Selected works ==
=== Book ===
- MacDonald, Dennis R. (1983). The Legend and the Apostle: The Battle for Paul in Story and Canon. Philadelphia, PA: Westminster John Knox Press. ISBN 9780664244644. OCLC 8975344.
- ——— (1990). The Acts of Andrew and the Acts of Andrew and Matthias in the city of the cannibals. Texts and translations. Vol. 33. Atlanta, GA: Scholars Press. ISBN 9781555404925. OCLC 21950803.
- ——— (1994). Christianizing Homer: "The Odyssey," Plato, and "The Acts of Andrew". Oxford, UK & New York: Oxford University Press. ISBN 978-0-19-508722-2. OCLC 473473966.
- ——— (2000). The Homeric Epics and the Gospel of Mark. New Haven, CT: Yale University Press. ISBN 9780300080124. OCLC 42389595.
- ——— (2003). Does the New Testament Imitate Homer? Four Cases from the Acts of the Apostles. New Haven, CT: Yale University Press. ISBN 978-0-300-09770-2. OCLC 475204848.
- ——— (2005). Acts Of Andrew: Early Christian Apocrypha. Santa Rosa, CA: Polebridge Press. ISBN 9780944344552. OCLC 60550838.
- ——— (2012). Two Shipwrecked Gospels: the logoi of Jesus and Papias's exposition of logia about the Lord. Early Christianity and its Literature. Vol. 8. Atlanta, GA: Society of Biblical Literature. ISBN 9781589836907. OCLC 949184274.

=== Edited by ===
- ———, ed. (2001). Mimesis and Intertextuality in Antiquity and Christianity. Studies in antiquity and Christianity. Harrisburg, PA: Trinity Press International. ISBN 9781563383359. OCLC 44868965.
- ———; Brodie, Thomas L.; Porter, Stanley E., eds. (2006). The Intertextuality of the Epistles Explorations of Theory and Practice. New Testament monographs. Vol. 16. Sheffield, UK: Sheffield Phoenix Press. ISBN 9781905048625. OCLC 84673847.

=== Chapters ===
- ——— (2001). "Tobit and the Odyssey". In ——— (ed.). Mimesis and Intertextuality in Antiquity and Christianity. Studies in antiquity and Christianity. Harrisburg, PA: Trinity Press International. pp. 11–55. ISBN 9781563383359. OCLC 44868965.
- ——— (2006). "A Categorization of Antetextuality in the Gospels and Acts: a case for Luke's imitation of Plato and Xenophon to depict Paul as a Christian Socrates". In ———; Brodie, Thomas L.; Porter, Stanley E. (eds.). The Intertextuality of the Epistles Explorations of Theory and Practice. New Testament monographs. Vol. 16. Sheffield, UK: Sheffield Phoenix Press. pp. 211–25. ISBN 9781905048625. OCLC 84673847.
