= The Worldwide Machine =

1965 novel written by Paolo Volponi

La macchina mondiale
- Author: Paolo Volponi
- Language: Italian
- Genre: Philosophical fiction
- Publisher: Garzanti
- Publication date: 1965
- Publication place: Italy
- Pages: 196

The Worldwide Machine, also translated as The World Machine (Italian: La macchina mondiale), is a 1965 philosophical novel by Italian writer Paolo Volponi. An English translation by Belén Sevareid was published by Grossman Publishers in 1967. A new translation by Richard Dixon was published by Seagull Books and University of Chicago Press in 2024.

The novel won the Strega Prize in 1965 and has been translated into seven languages.

== Plot ==
The story is set in the Marche region of central Italy of the 1950s and '60s and is narrated by Anteo Crocioni, a young self-taught rustic philosopher, who lives in the hamlet of San Savino, near Frontone, in the province of Pesaro. He develops a theory that people are machines that have been built by other machines and that the true destiny of mankind is to build ever more sophisticated machines through which society will become liberated. He has begun to write down his techno-utopian vision of the world in a treatise entitled For the Constitution of a New Academy of Friendship of Qualified People which he hopes to publish and present to university professors in Rome and abroad.

But he is branded a communist for his ideas, and in preaching them he sets himself against the church authorities and a local landowner. Meanwhile he leaves his land uncultivated and alienates himself from those who might have helped him. His wife Massimina, whom he meets at the local market in Pergola, remains loyal to him despite his ill treatment of her, but finally leaves when he mortgages the house in a reckless investment on farm machinery that exposes them to financial ruin.

She flees to Rome and finds a job as a servant to a government official. Anteo is still in love with Massimina and travels to Rome in search of her. He finds odd jobs, working as an animal keeper in a circus, on a nougat stall, then selling lupini beans on the streets. Meanwhile he publishes part of his treatise and seeks to interest professors and students at the University, but they view his ideas with incomprehension. He finds Massimina who reports him to the police for harassment and cruelty, and he is arrested and expelled from Rome.

He returns to San Savino and isolates himself, foraging and stealing from his neighbours. His only friend is Liborio, a young priest he had met several years before, who is now the priest of Acquaviva, a local village.

Massimina returns to visit her family. Anteo tries to persuade her once again to return to live with him, and violates her, making her pregnant. She flees back to Rome. Nine months later she secretly gives birth to a child, who dies. Her employer discovers what has happened and she is arrested for concealment of a corpse.

Meanwhile Anteo appears before a magistrate in Pergola and is found guilty of illtreating his wife. The court in Urbino rejects his appeal and sentences him to a suspended period of imprisonment. Anteo obtains a quantity of dynamite from the local sulphur mine at Bellisio, locks the doors of his house, and prepares to blow himself up.

== Translations ==
The English translation of La macchina mondiale, by Belén Sevareid, appeared under the title The Worldwide Machine (Grossman, New York 1967; Calder and Boyars, London 1969). A new translation by Richard Dixon under the title The World Machine was published by Seagull Books and University of Chicago Press in 2024.

It has also been translated into German (Die Weltmaschine, trans. Gerhard Fasterding, S. Fischer Verlag, Frankfurt 1966; Piper Verlag, Monaco 1987; S. Fischer Verlag, Frankfurt 2016), French (Le Système d’Anteo Crocioni, trans. Maurice Javion, Bernard Grasset Editeur, Paris 1969), Romanian (Maşinăria universului, trans. Andrei Benedek, Colecţia Meridiane, Bucharest 1966), Serbian (Светска машина, trans. Ivan Klajn, Edizioni Protsveta, Belgrade 1967), Czech (Světa Stroj, trans. Zdeněk Digrin, Odeon, Prague 1968), and Japanese (『アンテオの世界』 (The World of Anteo), trans. K. Chigusa, Hayakawa Shobo, Tachō 1969).

== Critical reception ==
Contemporary Italian critics expressed differing views. Giuliano Manacorda felt the central character was less convincing than the protagonist in his previous novel Memoriale, while Romano Luperini found Crocioni's madness to be an effective tool for social condemnation and Walter Pedullà considered Anteo to be "the rightful heir of all rebels who in every age have rashly opposed established order".

Kirkus Reviews thought the novel was "closer to Musil and Kafka, to dehydrated prose, indirect representation, and allegorical issues. The first person narrator here exists in the closed world of his own mind, coolly spinning an abstract meditation on the evolutionary drive of the future and the bourgeois [f]olly of the present."

R. L. Clements described Volponi's narrator as "surely one of the most bewilderingly pathetic figures in contemporary Italian fiction."
