= Distant Light (novel) =

2013 novel by Antonio Moresco

- Author: Antonio Moresco
- Original title: La lucina
- Translator: Richard Dixon
- Language: Italian
- Publisher: Mondadori
- Publication date: 19 February 2013
- Publication place: Italy
- English publication date: 15 March 2016
- Pages: 168
- ISBN: 978-88-04-62508-7

Distant Light (Italian: La lucina, lit. 'The Little Light') is a 2013 novel by the Italian writer Antonio Moresco. It is a meditative story about a man who has withdrawn to an abandoned village and encounters a mysterious boy.

Kirkus Reviews called the book "unsettling and strangely tender". It was shortlisted for the 2018 International Dublin Literary Award.

The novel was the basis for the 2023 comic book La Petite Lumière by Grégory Panaccione.
