= Antonio Moresco =

Italian writer (born 1947)

- Born: 30 October 1947 (age 78); Mantua
- Occupation: Writer
- Writing career
- Genres: Fiction, Essay

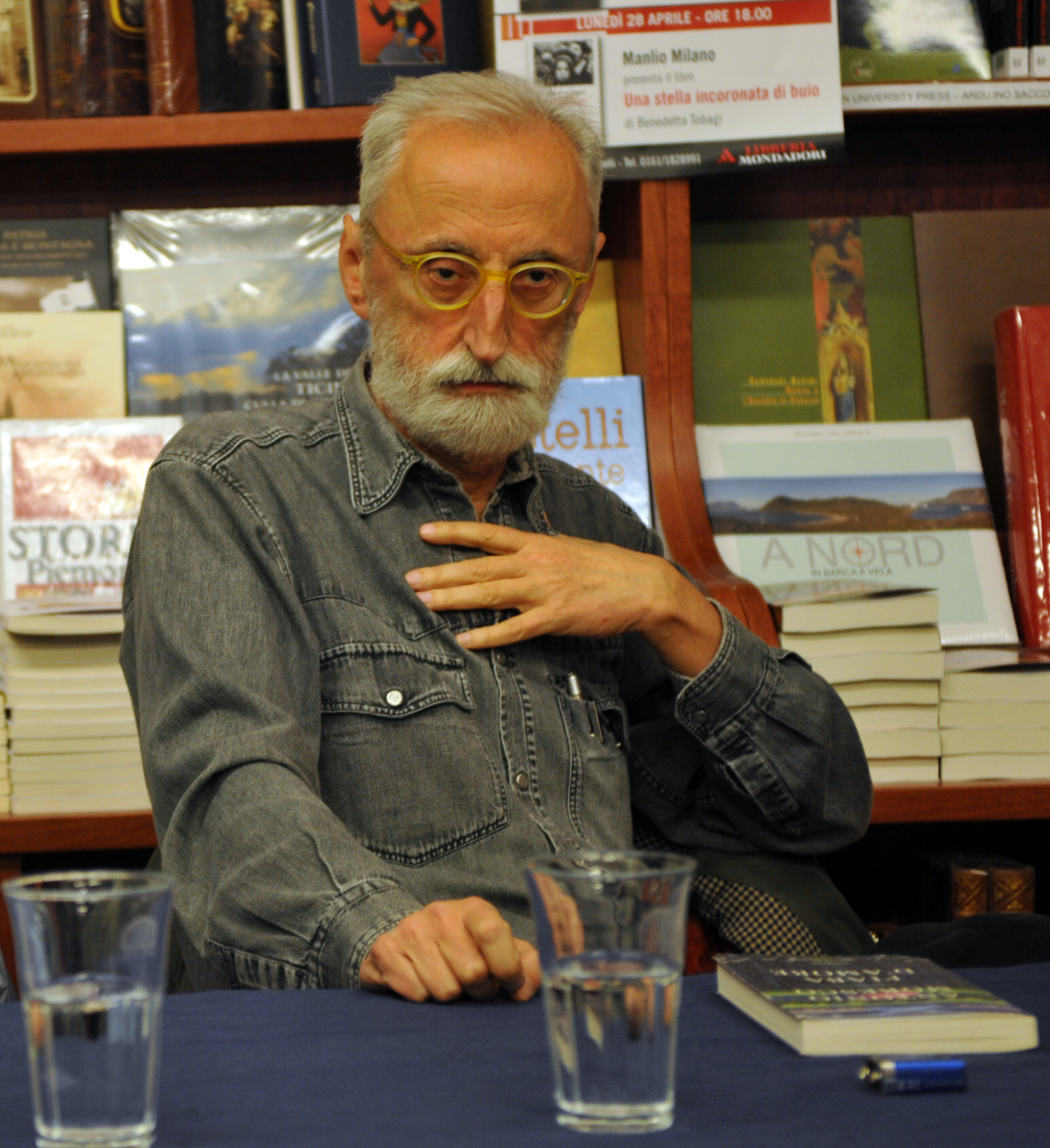
Antonio Moresco in 2014

Antonio Moresco (born 30 October 1947) is an Italian writer.

Defined as one of the founding fathers of a new line of Italian literature that moves beyond post-modernity, and likened to Don DeLillo and Thomas Pynchon, he has been described by Roberto Saviano as "a literary heritage".

His first publications appeared late in his life after he had been turned down by several publishers. In 1993, he published his first novel, Clandestinita', but his career-defining project is the monumental trilogy Giochi dell'eternità, made up of the following volumes: Gli esordi (Feltrinelli 1998, republished by Mondadori in 2011), Canti del caos (part 1 by Feltrinelli in 2001, part 2 by Rizzoli in 2003; republished by Mondadori in 2009), and Gli increati (Mondadori 2015). He has published many other works, such as the novel Distant Light, short stories, children's stories, and he has organized several collective marches throughout Italy and Europe, which have become the topics for some of his works.

== Works ==
- Clandestinità (Bollati Boringhieri, 1993)
- La cipolla (Bollati Boringhieri, 1995)
- Lettere a nessuno (Bollati Boringhieri, 1997)
- Gli esordi (Feltrinelli, 1998) - English translation by Max Lawton: The Beginnings (Deep Vellum, 2026)
- La visione (conversation with Carla Benedetti, KKP, 1999)
- Il vulcano (Bollati Boringhieri, 1999)
- Storia d'amore e di specchi (Portofranco, 2000)
- La santa (theatre play, Bollati Boringhieri, 2000)
- Canti del caos (part I, Feltrinelli, 2001)
- L'invasione (Rizzoli, 2002)
- Canti del caos (part II, Rizzoli, 2003)
- Lo sbrego (Holden Maps – Bur, Rizzoli, 2005)
- Scritti di viaggio, di combattimento e di sogno (Fanucci, 2005)
- Zio Demostene (Effigie, 2005)
- Merda e luce (Effigie, 2007)
- Le favole della Maria (Einaudi, 2007)
- Zingari di merda (Effigie, 2008)
- Lettere a nessuno (parts I and II, Einaudi, 2008)
- Canti del caos (parts I, II and III, Mondadori, 2009)
- Gli incendiati (Mondadori, 2010)
- Il combattimento (Mondadori, 2012) – includes Clandestinità, La cipolla and three short stories, La camera blu, La buca and Il re - English translation by Richard Dixon: Clandestinity (Deep Vellum, 2022)
- La lucina (Mondadori, 2013) - English translation by Richard Dixon: Distant Light (Archipelago, 2016), shortlisted for the American Literary Translators Association Italian Prose in Translation Award, 2017, shortlisted for the International Dublin Literary Award, 2018
- Tutto d'un fiato (XS Mondadori (ebook), 2013)
- Fiaba d'amore (Mondadori, 2014)
- Gli increati (Mondadori, 2015)
- L'addio (Giunti, 2016)
- Canto di D'Arco (Sem, 2019)
- Canto degli alberi (Aboca, 2020)
- Chisciotte, (Società Editrice Milanese, 2020)
- Stelle in gola, (Società Editrice Milanese, 2021)
- Diario del caos, (Wojtek, 2022)
- Canto del buio e della luce, (Feltrinelli, 2024)

== Collaborations ==
- Controinsurrezioni (Mondadori, 2008), with Valerio Evangelisti
- Otto preghierine per una nuova vita (Scuola di Urbino, 2012), illustrated by Giuliano Della Casa
- Fiabe (SEM Milan, 2017), illustrated by Nicola Samorì
