= Eugenio De Signoribus =

Italian poet (born 1947)

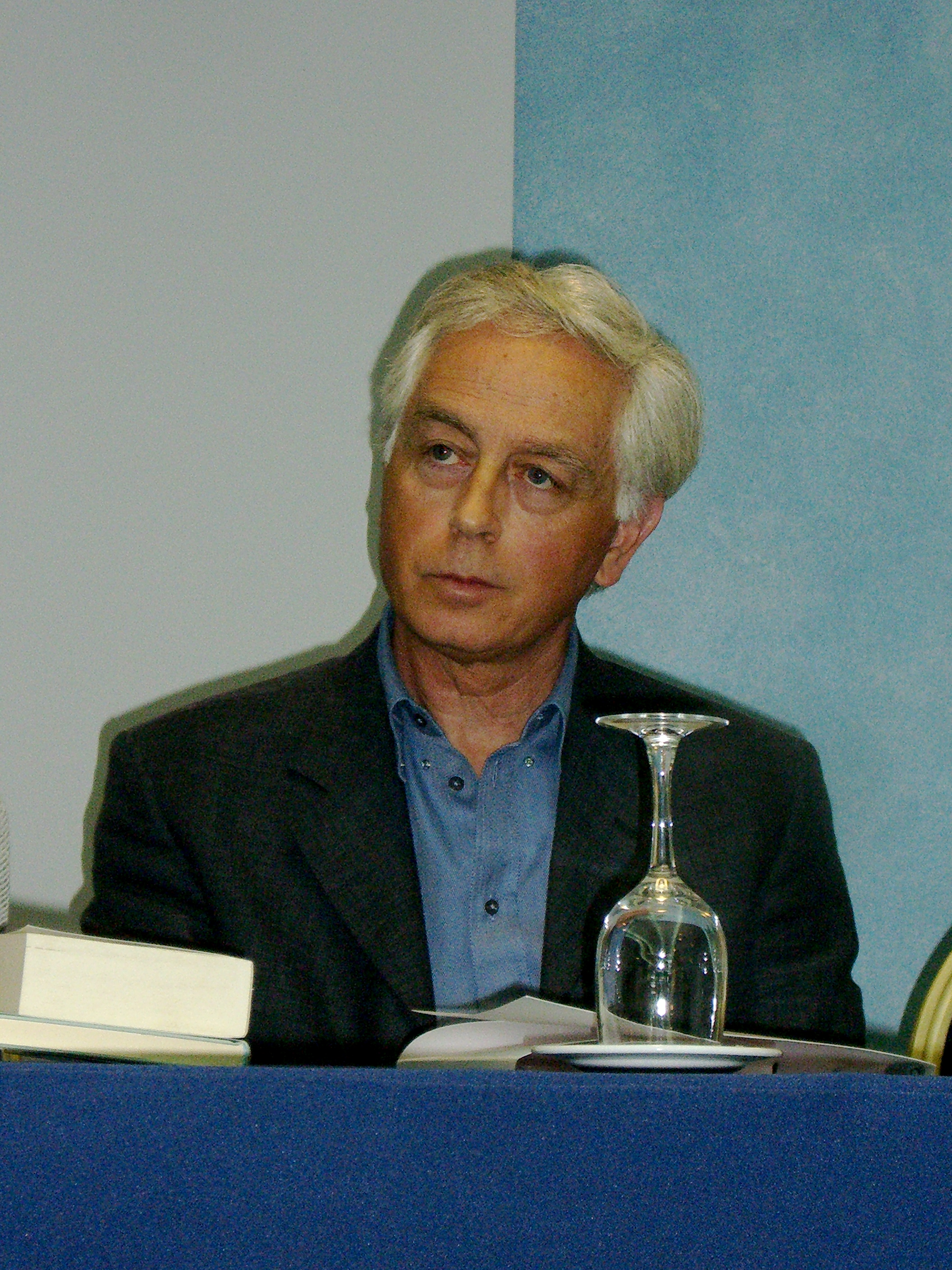
Eugenio De Signoribus

Eugenio De Signoribus (born 1947) is an Italian poet. He was born and lives in Cupra Marittima in the province of Ascoli Piceno, Italy. He was winner in 2002 of the Castelfiorentino Literature Prize and in 2008 of the Viareggio Prize.

Swedish Academician Kjell Espmark has described him as "a more severe and rigorous voice than those to which we are accustomed. His powerfully visionary poetry frees itself from every casual or superfluous element to give emphasis to the primary conditions of existence."

He is a co-editor of the Istmi literary journal.

== Works ==
- Case perdute, 1976–1985 (il lavoro editoriale,1989).
- Istmi e chiuse, 1989–1995 (Marsilio, 1996)
- Principio del giorno, 1990–1999 (Garzanti, 2000)
- Altre educazioni, 1980–1999 (Crocetti, 2001)
- Memoria del chiuso mondo (Quodlibet, 2002)
- Ronda dei conversi (Garzanti, 2005)
- Poesie (1976–2007) (Garzanti, 2008)
- Nessun luogo è elementare (Alberto Tallone Editore, 2010)
- Trinità dell'esodo, 2005–2010 (Garzanti, 2011)
- Veglie genovesi (Il Canneto Editore, 2013)
- Stazioni 1994-2017 (Manni, Lecce, 2018)

Poems by De Signoribus have appeared in the following English translations:

- by Christopher Whyte in Lines Review, 1994
- by Emanuel di Pasquale in New Italian Poetry: an anthology, 2006
- by Christopher Whyte and V. Joshua Adams in The FSG Book of Twentieth Century Italian Poetry, 2012
- by Johanna Bishop, Damiano Abeni and Moira Egan in Canone Inverso, Anthology of Contemporary Italian Literature, 2014
- by Richard Dixon in Nuovi Argomenti, 2013; The Journal of Italian Translation, 2013; Almost Island, 2014; Italian Contemporary Poets: an anthology, 2016;The Journal of Italian Translation, 2018;The World Poetry Review, Issue 9, 2024; Those Who From Afar Look Like Flies: An anthology of Italian Poetry from Pasolini to the present, Tome II, 1975-2015;

His poetry has also been translated into French and Swedish.
