= Hope (Pope Francis memoir) =

2024 memoir by Pope Francis

- First edition cover (2024)
- Author: Pope Francis
- Translator: Richard Dixon
- Subject: Religion
- Genre: Autobiography
- Publisher: Random House
- Publication date: 14 January 2025
- Pages: 320
- ISBN: 9780593978795

Hope: The Autobiography is a memoir by Pope Francis (born Jorge Mario Bergoglio). It was first published by Random House on 14 January 2025 (three months before his death), with the publisher describing it as the first memoir ever published by a sitting pope. (Note: According to The New York Times, it is not actually the first memoir published by a sitting pope. The newspaper credits the first memoir to Pope Pius II, whose "The Commentaries" was published during his lifetime in the 15th century. The Times also points out that other Popes have shared their life stories, such as through books published with journalists.) The book is based on notes from interviews that Francis conducted with the Italian journalist Carlo Musso over six years. Francis discusses his childhood in Buenos Aires, the conclave that elected him pope, and his direction of the church after his election.

== Contents ==
In the opening of the book, Francis recounts how his grandparents and father almost perished on their journey from Italy to Argentina. The family had booked tickets on a ship that would sink en route; however, at the last minute, they swapped their tickets for a different ship. Francis goes on to write about the death of his father, who suffered a heart attack at a soccer game in 1961. Following his father's death, Francis took on more responsibility for the family, including caring for his four younger siblings. In describing his childhood, The New York Times wrote: "[Francis] vividly recreates the colorful world where the young Jorge Mario Bergoglio grew up — a world that was a menagerie of migrants from various countries and colorful figures".

In the second half of the book, Francis writes about his election to the papacy and his subsequent leadership. He describes his emotions upon hearing that he had received enough votes to ascend to the highest position in the church. Other topics covered include his push to bring better financial practices to the administration of the Vatican; his approval of blessings for gay couples; and his support for immigrants.

Revelations from the memoir included the foiling of an assassination attempt on Francis's life during his 2021 visit to Iraq. The planned attack was discovered by British intelligence who informed Iraqi police. It involved two suicide bombers who would attack during a planned speech by Francis. The two planned attackers were subsequently killed by the Iraqi police before his visit. Francis writes about his plans for a simple funeral at Santa Maria Maggiore, his favorite church.

== Reception ==
In an article for The Guardian, British Catholic historian Catherine Pepinster gave the book a mixed review. Pepinster praised the insight the pope provided, but also noted how he skated over scandals such as his decision to hold a mass in Chile in 2018 with a bishop who was accused of covering up sex abuse, his claim that he was unaware of reports regarded sexual abuse committed by former cardinal Theodore McCarrick even after they were received by Vatican, and the controversy concerning his alleged failure to help two Jesuit priests who were tortured by the former Argentine junta when he was head of the Argentinean Jesuit order.

Nicole Winfield of the Associated Press praised Francis for his introspection and self-criticism concerning his youth, while criticizing his lack of self analysis when describing his papacy. Winfield writes: "The second half of the book, focusing on the papacy, is far less self-critical and in fact is strident in defending his sometimes controversial decisions".
