= Paolo Volponi =

Italian writer (1924–1994)

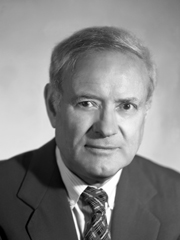

Personal details
- Born: 6 February 1924 Urbino, Kingdom of Italy
- Died: 23 August 1994 (aged 70) Ancona, Italy
- Education: University of Urbino
- Profession: Poet; writer

Paolo Volponi (6 February 1924 – 23 August 1994) was an Italian writer, poet, and politician.

== Biography ==
Volponi was born on 6 February 1924, in Urbino, Italy. He joined the Italian partisans in 1943.

He studied law at Urbino University, where he graduated in 1947. His career as a writer was profoundly influenced by his meeting with the enlightened social thinker and industrialist Adriano Olivetti in 1950, for whom he worked as an assistant and then as director of social services at the Olivetti factory at Ivrea. He moved to Turin in 1972 to join Fiat and was appointed president of the Fondazione Agnelli in 1975 but was obliged to resign because of his open support for the Italian Communist Party. He was elected to the Italian Senate in 1983.

Volponi died on 23 August 1994.

== Works ==
His first volume of poems, Il ramarro, was published in 1948; he won the Viareggio Prize in 1960 for Le porte dell'Appennino and the Mondello Prize in 1986 for Con testo a fronte.

His novels explore the ills of Italian society in the years of industrial expansion after the Second World War, while powerfully constructing a visionary fictional world. His first novel, Memoriale (1962), describes the atmosphere of growing violence in a factory environment and in society as seen through the eyes of a working man, leading to his alienation and gradual descent into madness.

La macchina mondiale won the Strega Prize in 1965. Its tragic main character, a peasant-philosopher living in the Marche region, has been described as "surely one of the most bewilderingly pathetic figures in contemporary Italian fiction".

In Corporale (1974), an ex-communist intellectual becomes obsessed by the threat of nuclear war and builds himself a shelter in the hope of emerging, once it is all over, closer to the animal world.

Il sipario ducale (1975), with which he won the Viareggio Prize in 1975 for the second time, marked a return to a more traditional form with a story told against the background of a bomb attack in Piazza Fontana, Milan in 1969.

Il pianeta irritabile (1978) is an allegorical story set in 2293 where four characters – a baboon, an elephant, a goose and a dwarf – escape a final explosion and wander off looking for a safe kingdom, encountering traps and terrifying obstacles, in a perpetual guerrilla activity whose scenes take place under diluvian rains that threaten to engulf the whole planet. There is no real end in sight, and this is the most disturbing aspect of the whole novel. "Everything is pointless. Volponi is the Samuel Beckett of science fiction in this work."

Il lanciatore di giavellotto (1981) contains a portrait of a troubled adolescent boy, Dami, which is, according to James Kirkup, "the most memorable of all such portraits since JD Salinger's The Catcher in the Rye, written 30 years before".

Le mosche del capitale (1989) charts the rise and fall of an industrialist poet.

With La strada per Roma (1991), Volponi became the first of only two Italian writers to win the Strega Prize twice.

== Bibliography ==
=== Fiction ===
- Memoriale (1962) – trans. Belén Sevareid – My Troubles Began (Grossman: New York, 1964); The Memorandum (Marion Boyars: London, 1967)
- La macchina mondiale (1965) – trans. Belén Sevareid – The Worldwide Machine (Grossman: New York, 1964; Calder and Boyars: London, 1969); trans. Richard Dixon – The World Machine (Seagull Books / University of Chicago Press, 2024)
- Corporale (1974)
- Il sipario ducale (1975) – trans. Peter Pedroni – Last Act in Urbino (Italica Press: New York, 1995)
- Il pianeta irritabile (1978)
- Il lanciatore di giavellotto (1981) – trans. Richard Dixon – The Javelin Thrower (Seagull Books / University of Chicago Press, 2019)
- Le mosche del capitale (1989)
- La strada per Roma (1991)

=== Poetry ===
- Il ramarro (1948)
- L'antica moneta (1955)
- Le porte dell'Appennino (1960);
- La nuova pesa (1964)
- Le mura di Urbino (1973)
- La vita (1974)
- Foglia mortale (1974)
- Con testo a fronte (1986)
- Nel silenzio campale (1990)
- È per un'impudente vanteria (1991)

=== Non-fiction ===
- Scritti dal margine (1994)
- Il leone e la volpe (1995)

=== Works in magazines ===
- Una luce celeste (1965)
- I sovrani e la ricchezza (1967)
- Accingersi all'impresa (1967)
- La barca Olimpia (1968)
- Olimpia e la pietra (1968)
- Case dell'alta valle del Metauro (1989)

=== Compilations ===
- Poesie e poemetti 1946–1966 (1980)
- Catalogo generale delle opere di Dolorès Puthod. Dipinti e disegni dal 1948 al 1994 (Milan, Giorgio Mondadori, 1994) ISBN 88-374-1379-3.
- Poesie (2001)
- Romanzi e prose I, II, III (2002–2003)

Volponi’s poems in translation appear in From Pure Silence to Impure Dialogue: a survey of post-war Italian poetry 1945–1965, edited and translated by Vittoria Bradshaw (New York: Las Americas, 1971).
