= Michael Taussig =

Australian anthropologist (born 1940)

Michael T. Taussig
- Born: 3 April 1940 (age 86); Sydney, Australia
- Children: Mateo Taussig-Rubbo, Santiago Taussig-Moore, Olivia Taussig-Rees
- Awards: Berlin Prize (2007); Guggenheim Fellowship (1998)

Academic background
- Education: University of Sydney; London School of Economics

Michael T. Taussig (born 3 April 1940 in Sydney) is an Australian anthropologist and professor at Columbia University. He is best known for his engagement with Marx's idea of commodity fetishism, especially in terms of the work of Walter Benjamin. Taussig has also published texts on medical anthropology.

He was awarded a Guggenheim Fellowship in 1998 and a Berlin Prize in 2007 from the American Academy in Berlin.

== Early life ==
Taussig was born in Sydney to Austrian refugee parents of German and Czech-Jewish ancestry. He completed his secondary education in 1958 at North Sydney Boys High School. He later earned a medical degree from the University of Sydney as well as a Master of Science in sociology at the London School of Economics and a PhD from the University of London.

== Books ==
=== The Devil and Commodity Fetishism (1980) ===
The Devil and Commodity Fetishism in South America is both a polemic about anthropology and an analysis of a set of magical beliefs held by workers in Colombia and Bolivia. Taussig's polemic is that the principal concern of anthropology should be to critique Western capitalist culture. He further argues that people living in the periphery of the world capitalist economy have a critical vantage point on capitalism and articulate their critiques of capitalism in terms of their own cultural idioms. He thus concludes that anthropologists should study these people as a way of gaining critical insight into the anthropologists' own culture.

Taussig applies this approach to two beliefs: one based on both his own field research and that of anthropologist June Nash, the second based solely on his own research. The first is the belief held by semi-proletarianized peasants in Colombia (with an analogous case among Bolivian tin miners) that sugar-cane cutters can make a deal with the devil that will earn them money, but that this money can be spent only on frivolous consumer goods and that the cutter will die an early and miserable death. Taussig suggests that earlier anthropologists might have argued that this belief is a hold-over from pre-capitalist culture, but instead he argues that this is peasants expressing their recognition of the alienation and commodity fetishism engendered by the capitalist system. The second belief, that some people engineer a switch that results in a peso being baptized rather than a baby, is another example of peasants representing their understanding of capitalism's claim that capital is productive.

=== Shamanism, Colonialism, and the Wild Man (1987) ===
Taussig's seminal work, Shamanism, Colonialism and the Wild Man: A Study in Terror and Healing, examines colonialism as it was carried out in South America. He uses firsthand accounts and his own ethnographic work.

Taussig begins by studying the rubber trade in the Putumayo river area of Colombia of the late 19th and early 20th century. The Europeans violently pressured the Indigenous population, who still lived under an economy based upon gift exchange, to extract rubber from the rubber trees of the area. The barons' reactions to Indigenous resistance was to carry out violence against the local population, which Taussig documents through firsthand accounts from the time and studies of Roger Casement's investigations.

In the second section, on healing, Taussig relates his ethnographic work with José García, an Indigenous shaman of the Putumayo, during the 1970s. He describes how García harnessed the mysterious and "wild" image projected onto him by the West in his practice as a shaman.

=== The Nervous System (1992) ===
Published in 1992, The Nervous System comprises nine essays, through which Taussig explores various forces that shape culture. This includes the commodification of the state by the people as well as how the state uses violence and media control to consolidate power. He argues that we live in a general state of emergency, citing Walter Benjamin, that is not. He also attempts to show the universality of the nervous system.

=== Mimesis and Alterity (1993) ===
Mimesis and Alterity looks primarily at the way people from different cultures experience cultural mimesis and alterity. Taussig studies this phenomenon through ethnographic accounts of the Guna people and through the ideas of Walter Benjamin.

The Guna have adopted a set of wooden figurines for magical ritual that look like white colonists, but deny connections between the figurines and historical colonizer figures, creating an epistemic dilemma where something that may appear obvious to anthropologists is not so obvious to the people they study. Taussig also mentions is the way in which the Guna have adopted images from Western pop culture in their traditional molas. Taussig criticises anthropology for reducing the Guna culture to one in which the Guna were impressed by colonists' ships and technologies and mistook them for gods. Taussig defends the independence of their lived culture from this anthropological reductionism.

== Bibliography ==
- The Devil and Commodity Fetishism in South America, 1980, ISBN 978-0-8078-4106-8.
- Shamanism, Colonialism, and the Wild Man: A Study in Terror and Healing, 1987, ISBN 978-0-226-79013-8.
- The Nervous System, 1992, ISBN 978-0-415-90445-2.
- Mimesis and Alterity: A Particular History of the Senses, 1993, ISBN 978-0-415-90687-6.
- The Magic of the State, 1997, ISBN 978-0-415-91791-9.
- Defacement: Public Secrecy and the Labor of the Negative, 1999, ISBN 978-0-8047-3200-0.
- Law in a Lawless Land: Diary of a Limpieza in Colombia, 2003, ISBN 978-0-226-79014-5.
- My Cocaine Museum, 2004, ISBN 978-0-226-79009-1.
- Walter Benjamin's Grave, 2006, ISBN 978-0-226-79004-6.
- What Color Is the Sacred?, 2009, ISBN 978-0-226-79006-0.
- I Swear I Saw This: Drawings in Fieldwork Notebooks, Namely My Own, 2011, ISBN 978-0-226-78982-8.
- Beauty and the Beast, 2012, ISBN 9780226789866.
- The Corn Wolf, 2015, ISBN 9780226310718.
- Mastery of Non-Mastery in the Age of Meltdown, 2020, ISBN 9780226698670.
- Speak the Wind by Hoda Afshar (with essay "Winds of History" by Michael Taussig), 2021, ISBN 978-1-913620-18-9.
- Corpse Magic: Echoes Active in the Slayer-Slain Nexus, 2025, ISBN 978-0226837413.
