= Richard Dixon (translator) =

English translator

Richard Dixon is an English translator of Italian literature. He translated the last works of Umberto Eco, including his novels The Prague Cemetery, shortlisted for the Independent Foreign Fiction Prize 2012, and Numero Zero, commended by the judges of the John Florio Prize, 2016. He has also translated works by Giacomo Leopardi, Roberto Calasso and Antonio Moresco.

== Life ==
Richard Dixon was born in Coventry, in 1956. He was educated at King Henry VIII School and Lanchester Polytechnic, where he graduated in Business Law. He practised as a barrister in London for ten years before moving to Italy in 1989, where he now lives.

== Selected translations ==
- The Prague Cemetery by Umberto Eco, 2011: shortlisted for the Independent Foreign Fiction Prize, 2012
- Inventing the Enemy by Umberto Eco, 2012
- Zibaldone by Giacomo Leopardi (with other translators), 2013
- The Combover by Adrián N. Bravi, 2013
- Author’s revisions to The Name of the Rose by Umberto Eco, 2014
- Ardor by Roberto Calasso, 2014
- The Art of the Publisher by Roberto Calasso, 2015
- Numero Zero by Umberto Eco, 2015: John Florio Prize, 2016: Commended translation
- Dante: The Story of His Life by Marco Santagata, 2016
- Distant Light by Antonio Moresco, 2016: shortlisted for the American Literary Translators Association Italian Prose in Translation Award, 2017, shortlisted for the International Dublin Literary Award, 2018
- The Experience of Pain by Carlo Emilio Gadda, 2017
- Chronicles of a Liquid Society by Umberto Eco, 2017
- The Ruin of Kasch by Roberto Calasso, 2018
- The Javelin Thrower by Paolo Volponi, 2019
- The Unnamable Present by Roberto Calasso, 2019
- Crossing the Rubicon: Caesar’s Decision and the Fate of Rome by Luca Fezzi, 2019
- The Celestial Hunter by Roberto Calasso, 2020
- The Lehman Trilogy by Stefano Massini, 2020
- How to Spot a Fascist by Umberto Eco (with co-translator Alastair McEwen), 2020
- Valse Triste by Marcello Fois, 2021
- The Book of Nonexistent Words by Stefano Massini, 2021
- South 1982 by Adrián N. Bravi, 2022
- Clandestinity by Antonio Moresco, 2022
- Philosophy of the Home: Domestic Space and Happiness by Emanuele Coccia, 2024
- The World Machine by Paolo Volponi, 2024
- Hope:The Autobiography by Pope Francis, 2025
- The Geek of Chic by Federico Marchetti, 2025
- There Was a Time for Such a Word by Gianni Solla, 2025

He has also translated contemporary Italian poets, including Franco Buffoni and Eugenio De Signoribus
