= Roberto Calasso =

Italian writer and publisher (1941–2021)

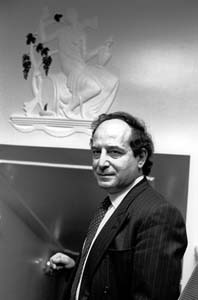
- Calasso in 1991
- Born: 30 May 1941; Florence, Italy
- Died: 28 July 2021 (aged 80); Milan, Italy
- Resting place: San Michele Cemetery, Venice
- Children: 3

Roberto Calasso (30 May 1941 – 28 July 2021) was an Italian writer and publisher. Apart from his mother tongue, Calasso was fluent in French, English, Spanish, German, Latin and ancient Greek. He also studied Sanskrit. He has been called "a literary institution of one". The fundamental thematic concept of his œuvre is the relationship between myth and the emergence of modern consciousness.

== Early life ==
Calasso was born in Florence in 1941, into a family of the Tuscan upper class, well connected with some of the great Italian intellectuals of their time. His maternal grandfather Ernesto Codignola was a professor of philosophy at Florence University. Codignola created a new publishing house called La Nuova Italia, in Florence, as his friend Benedetto Croce had done in Bari with Laterza. Calasso's uncle, Tristano Codignola, was a partisan during World War II who after the war joined the political life of the new republic, and was for a while Minister of Education. His mother Melisenda – who gave up an academic career to raise her three children – was a scholar of German literature, working on Hölderlin's translations of the Greek poet Pindar. Calasso's father Francesco was a law professor, first at Florence University and then in Rome, where he eventually became dean of his faculty. He was arrested by the fascist militia after the assassination of Giovanni Gentile and sentenced to be killed in reprisal, but was saved both by the intervention of friends of Gentile, with whom the family had connections on the maternal side, and by the German consul Gerhard Wolf.

At 12 Calasso met and was greatly influenced by a professor at Padua University, Enzo Turolla, and they became lifelong friends. In 1954 the family moved to Rome, where Calasso developed a passion for cinema. His English literature doctoral dissertation was Sir Thomas Browne's theory of hieroglyphs, which he completed under Mario Praz, while indulging himself with hashish.

== Career ==
Calasso worked for the publishing firm of Adelphi Edizioni since its founding by Roberto Bazlen in 1962 and became its Chairman in 1999. In 2015, he bought out the company to prevent it from being acquired by a larger publishing firm. His books have been translated into more than 20 languages.

He was the author of an unnamed ongoing work reflecting on the culture of modernity, which began with The Ruin of Kasch in 1983, a book admired by Italo Calvino. Dedicated to the French statesman Charles Maurice de Talleyrand-Périgord or, Talleyrand, it was followed in 1988 by The Marriage of Cadmus and Harmony, in which the tale of Cadmus and his wife Harmonia becomes a pretext for re-telling the great tales of Greek mythology and reflecting on the reception of Greek culture for a contemporary readership. Another world civilization is surveyed in Ka (1996, where the subject of the re-telling is Hindu mythology). K restricts the focus to a single author, Franz Kafka; this trend continues with Il rosa Tiepolo (Tiepolo Pink), inspired by an adjective used by Marcel Proust to describe a shade of pink used by Venetian artist Giambattista Tiepolo in his paintings. With La folie Baudelaire, Calasso once more broadens his scope from fresco to a whole civilisation, that of Paris in the latter half of the 19th century, reconsidering the lives and works of the post-romantic generation of writers and artists from Baudelaire to Valéry. In one of his more recent works, Ardore (2010), the author returns to India for an exhaustive analysis of the theory and practice of Vedic sacrifice and its significance for post-modern epistemology. Further entries in the series up to the time of his death include: The Celestial Hunter, The Unnamable Present, The Book of All Books, and The Tablet of Destiny.

His more narrowly focused essays relating to European modernity are collected in I quarantanove gradini (The Forty-nine Steps), addressed to Pierre Klossowski and his wife; Literature and the gods (2002) (based on his Weidenfeld Lectures at Oxford, on the decline and return of pagan imagery in the art of the west), and La follia che viene dalle ninfe (The Madness that Comes from the Nymphs), a collection of related essays ranging from Plato's Phaedrus to Nabokov's Lolita.

Along with his status as a major analyst specifically of the works of Kafka, Calasso was, more broadly, active in many essays in retrieving and re-invigorating the notion of a Central European literary culture. He also served as the president of the International Alexander Lernet-Holenia Society, which promotes the publication, translation and study of this multi-genre Austrian writer and his focus on the identity crisis of his characters at odds with postimperial Austria and Central Europe.

== Death ==
Calasso died in Milan on the evening of 28 July 2021, at the age of 80, a day before his two new books Bobi and Memè Scianca were released.

== Personal life ==
Calasso was survived by his wife, the Swiss writer Fleur Jaeggy, and two children, Josephine and Tancredi Calasso, both from the relationship with the German writer Anna Katharina Fröhlich.

== Reception ==
"Both critics and admirers have called Calasso a 'neo-gnostic', a master of secret knowledge", wrote Lila Azam Zanganeh of Calasso in a Paris Review article, where she also referred to him as "a literary institution of one". Terri Windling selected the English translation of The Marriage of Cadmus and Harmony as one of the best fantasy books of 1994, describing it as "a complex and intellectually dazzling novel using ancient Greek mythology to explore the origins of Western thought".

== Awards and honours ==
Roberto Calasso was elected an honorary member of the American Academy of Arts and Letters in 2015.

- 2001 Viareggio Prize, Special Prize, La letteratura e gli dei
- 2002 Bagutta Prize, La letteratura e gli dei
- 2018 Prix Formentor

== Bibliography ==
Original title	Year	English translation	Year	Translator	Notes
L'impuro folle	1974				Novel
La rovina di Kasch	1983	The Ruin of Kasch	1994	William Weaver and Stephen Sartarelli	Book-length essay about Charles Maurice de Talleyrand-Périgord
			2018	Richard Dixon	New translation
Le nozze di Cadmo e Armonia	1988	The Marriage of Cadmus and Harmony	1993	Tim Parks	Book-length essay, Prix européen de l'essai Charles Veillon
I quarantanove gradini	1991	The Forty-nine Steps	2001	John Shepley	Essays
Ka	1996	Ka: Stories of the Mind and Gods of India	1998	Tim Parks	Book-length essay. Parks' translation was retold in 2005 by Geeta Dharmarajan as Ka: The Story of Garuda
Sentieri tortuosi. Bruce Chatwin Fotografo	1998	Winding Paths: Photographs by Bruce Chatwin	1999		Photography by Bruce Chatwin, edited and introduced by Calasso
L'editoria come genere letterario Internet Archive copy	2001				Lecture given 17 October in Moscow, for an exhibition on the Adelphi publishing company; published on the online literary review Adelphiana, 16 November 2001
La letteratura e gli dèi	2001	Literature and the Gods	2001	Tim Parks	Essays, based on the 1999–2000 Weidenfeld Lectures at Oxford
K.	2002	K.	2005	Geoffrey Brock	Book-length essay about Franz Kafka
Cento lettere a uno sconosciuto	2003				Selection of cover notes ("blurbs") written by Calasso for Adelphi Editions publications
La follia che viene dalle Ninfe	2005				Essays
Il rosa Tiepolo	2006	Tiepolo Pink	2009	Alastair McEwen	Book-length essay about Giovanni Battista Tiepolo
La folie Baudelaire	2008	La folie Baudelaire	2012	Alastair McEwen	Book-length essay
L'ardore	2010	Ardor	2014	Richard Dixon	Essays about the Vedas वेद and their philosophy
L'impronta dell'editore	2013	The Art of the Publisher	2015	Richard Dixon	Essays and reflections about publishing and working as a publisher
Il Cacciatore Celeste	2016	The Celestial Hunter	2020	Richard Dixon	Meditations on prehistoric human consciousness
L'innominabile attuale	2017	The Unnamable Present	2019	Richard Dixon	A follow-up to The Ruin of Kasch examining the current state of the world
Il libro di tutti i libri	2019	The Book of All Books	2021	Tim Parks	A reimagining of stories from the Bible.
La Tavoletta dei Destini	2020	The Tablet of Destinies	2022	Tim Parks	An examination of origin stories of human civilization.
Come ordinare una biblioteca	2020				Four essays on books and libraries.
Allucinazioni americane	2021				Essays on cinema and the work of Alfred Hitchcock.
Bobi	2021				Released a day after his death.
Memè Scianca	2021				Released a day after his death.
