= The Unnamable Present =

2017 book by Roberto Calasso

- Author: Roberto Calasso
- Original title: L'innominabile attuale
- Translator: Richard Dixon
- Language: Italian
- Published: 2017
- Publisher: Farrar, Straus and Giroux and Penguin Books
- Publication place: Italy
- English publication date: 2019
- Media type: Print (Hardcover)
- Pages: 193 pp. (hardcover edition)
- ISBN: 0374279470

The Unnamable Present is a 2017 meditation by Roberto Calasso on the re-emergence of nationalism and totalitarianism in global politics and culture in the context of an artificially intelligent contemporary world-system. The ninth volume of Calasso's nameless cycle of reflections which began with the Ruin of Kasch, it is composed of two longer essays entitled "Tourists and Terrorists" and "The Vienna Gas Company" followed by a brief coda called "Sighting of the Towers."

== Essays ==
Tourists and Terrorists

Calasso discusses the feedback relationship between the rise of internet pornography and the rise of Islamic terrorism in the 21st century: how the unmanageable and inexorable spread of online porn's easy availability in culturally Muslim countries helped to fuel a radical (and ultimately violent) reaction against the West, how the consumerist model of "tourist" culture denudes the existential vapidity of the secular Enlightenment, and how all of these elements have contributed to a moment of cultural and geopolitical breakdown characterized by anomie, broken epistemology and existential threat by the time we arrive at the book's present in the year immediately predating--and, in many passages, apparently anticipating-- the cascade of elections introducing a new generation of nationalist world-leaders including Donald Trump, Duterte, Orban, Bolsonaro and others.

When combined with the context of the book's second essay, Calasso's reflections on utilitarianism and the metaphysics of free-market economy in the first half of the book reveal thematic and structural affinities to the Dialectic of the Enlightenment: the book comes to resemble an updated, condensed version of Adorno and Horkheimer's magnum opus laced with narratives, anecdotes and biographical sketches from the period in which that work was written.

The Vienna Gas Company

The title of this essay recalls a line from a grim joke told by Walter Benjamin in one of his World War II letters which presaged the nature and methods used to kill concentration camp victims in the (still ongoing and yet to be fully scaled in terms of its execution) Holocaust. The piece is an impressionistic evocation of the rise of Adolf Hitler and the Third Reich, with special emphasis on the perspectives of a wide variety of European intellectuals observing these events as they unfolded.
