= Acts of Andrew =

Earliest testimony of the acts and miracles of the Christian apostle Andrew

The Acts of Andrew (Latin: Acta Andreae) is a Christian apocryphal work describing acts and miracles of Andrew the Apostle. It is alluded to in a Coptic 3rd-century work titled the Manichaean Psalm Book, so it must have been composed prior to that century. By the 4th century, the stories told in the book were considered apocryphal, and the book was relegated to the New Testament apocrypha.

Historically, it was often classed as Gnostic in origin before the works discovered at Nag Hammadi clarified modern understanding of Gnosticism. It is now considered encratite—a product of an ascetical sect of Christians that forbade marriage.

Prior to the twentieth century, Acts of Andrew was known chiefly through a book about Andrew by the medieval bishop Gregory of Tours. At that time, Gregory's book was considered to be a reliable epitome of the Acts of Andrew. The first modern edition of the work was a reconstruction published in 1924 by M. R. James that was based on Gregory's book. A new edition was published in 1989 by Jean-Marc Prieur based on manuscripts that had come to light in the years since 1924.

Two main manuscript traditions have been rediscovered, (Note: Lieuwe Van Kampen, "Acta Andreae and Gregory's 'De miraculis Andreae'", Vigiliae Christianae 45.1 (March 1991), pp. 18-26.) as well as some citations and fragments that are assumed to have come from other lost sections. One of the two longer manuscripts is an early Coptic manuscript first published by Gilles Quispel in 1956 and now held at Utrecht University Library. Of an original fifteen pages, five had survived, constituting part of one of the narratives about Andrew. In this narrative, Andrew confronts a demon possessing a soldier. The other, much longer manuscript tradition is embodied in the Greek Martyrdom of Andrew (Martyrium Andreae prius), which, when supplemented by other manuscript fragments, totals 65 chapters.

According to Prieur, the Acts of Andrew shows several signs of a mid-2nd-century origin. "The distinctive christology of the text" and its lack of mention of church organisation, liturgy, and ecclesiastical rites, lead one to "militate for an early dating". Prieur also stated that its "serene tone" and innocence of any polemic or disputes concerning its ideas or awareness of heterodoxy, particularly in the area of christology, show that "it derived from a period when the christology of the Great Church had not yet taken firm shape".

Traditionally, the text is said to have been based on the Acts of John and the Acts of Peter, and even to have had the same author, the "Leucius Charinus" who is credited with all the 2nd-century romances. Like these works, the Acts of Andrew describes the travels of the title character, the miracles he performed during them, and finally his martyrdom. In fact, Dennis MacDonald, in his book Christianizing Homer: The Odyssey, Plato, and the Acts of Andrew, speculates that the book was a Christian retelling of Homer's Odyssey.

In a separate text known by the name of the Acts of Andrew and Matthias, which was edited by Max Bonnet in 1898 and translated by M.R. James, Matthias is portrayed as a captive in a country of anthropophagi (literally 'man-eaters', i.e. cannibals) and is rescued by Andrew and Jesus; it is no longer considered to be a portion of the text of Acta Andreae.

Like those in the two books of Acts on which it appears based, the miracles are extremely supernatural and highly extravagant. For example, aside from the usual miracles of raising the dead, healing the blind, and so forth, he survives being placed amongst fierce animals, calms storms, and defeats armies simply by crossing himself. There is also a great deal of moralising - Andrew causes an embryo which was illegitimate to die, and also rescues a boy from his incestuous mother, an act resulting in her laying false charges against them, requiring God to send an earthquake to free Andrew and the boy. So much does the text venture into the realm of extreme supernatural events, that, while being crucified, Andrew is still able to give sermons for three days.

Eusebius of Caesarea knew the work, which he dismissed as absurd and the production of a heretic. Gregory of Tours was delighted to find a copy and wrote a drastically reduced recension of it about 593, leaving out the parts for "which, because of its excessive verbosity, [it] was called by some apocryphal", for which he felt it had been condemned. His free version expunges the detail that the apostle's ascetic preaching induced the proconsul's wife to leave her husband—socially and morally unacceptable to a Merovingian audience— brings the narrative into conformity with catholic orthodoxy of his time, then adds new material.
