= Dionysian imitatio =

Literary technique

Dionysian imitatio is the influential literary method of imitation as formulated by Greek author Dionysius of Halicarnassus in the first century BCE, which conceived it as the rhetorical practice of emulating, adapting, reworking and enriching a source text by an earlier author. It is a departure from the concept of Aristotelian mimesis which only is concerned with "imitation of nature" instead of the "imitation of other authors."

== History ==
Three centuries after Aristotle's Poetics, from the 4th century BCE to the 1st century BCE, the meaning of mimesis as a literary method had shifted from "imitation of nature" to "imitation of other authors". No historical record is left to explain the reason for this change. Dionysius' three volume work On mimesis (On imitation), which was the most influential for Latin authors, is lost. Most of it contained advice on how to identify the most suitable writers to imitate and the best way to imitate them. For Dionysian imitatio, the object of imitation was not a single author but the qualities of many.

Latin orators and rhetoricians adopted the literary method of Dionysius' imitatio and discarded Aristotle's mimesis; the imitation literary approach is closely linked with the widespread observation that "everything has been said already", which was also stated by Egyptian scribes around 2000 BCE. The ideal aim of this approach to literature was not originality, but to surpass the predecessor by improving their writings and set the bar to a higher level. A prominent Latin follower of Dionysius was Quintilian, who shared with him the view of imitatio as the practice that leads to an historical progress of literature over time. Both Dionysius and Quintilian discuss imitation exclusively from the point of view of rhetoric. In Quintilian, and in classical rhetoric in general, rhetoric drew much attention to the process of imitatio; the four operations of quadripartita ratio that organize all the figures of speech, defined as a "ready-made framework" of "relatively mechanical procedures" for the emulation, adaptation, reworking and enrichment of a source text by an earlier author. This view of rhetoric was taken by Erasmus in De Copia Rerum.

== Mimesis ==
Dionysius' concept marked a significant departure from the concept of mimesis formulated by Aristotle in the 4th century BCE, which was only concerned with "imitation of nature" instead of the "imitation of other authors." Latin orators and rhetoricians adopted the literary method of Dionysius' imitatio and discarded Aristotle's mimesis. In Aristotle's Poetics, lyric poetry, epic poetry, drama, dancing, painting are all described as forms of mimesis.
