= List of Italian writers =

This is a list of notable Italian writers, including novelists, essayists, poets, and other people whose primary artistic output was literature.

== A ==
- Maddalena Aceiaiuoli (1557–1610)
- Crescenzo Alatri (1825–1897)
- Attilio Albergoni (born 1949)
- Sibilla Aleramo (1876–1960)
- Vittorio Alfieri (1749–1803)
- Dante Alighieri (1265–1321)
- Magdi Allam (born 1951)
- Ernesto Aloia (born 1965)
- Corrado Alvaro (1895–1956)
- Pasquale Amati (1726–1792)
- Niccolò Ammaniti (born 1966)
- Elisa S. Amore (born 1984)
- Andrea da Grosseto (13th century)
- Cecco Angiolieri (13th century)
- Giulio Angioni (1939–2017)
- Ludovico Ariosto (1474–1533)
- Giovanni Arpino (1927–1987)
- Antonia Arslan (born 1938)
- Devorà Ascarelli (16th century)

== B ==
- Emma Baeri (born 1942)
- Andrea Bajani(born 1975)
- Alfredo Balducci (1920–2011)
- Barbara Baraldi
- Ermolao Barbaro (1454–1493)
- Ermolao Barbaro (bishop) (1410–1474)
- Francesco Barbaro (1390–1454)
- Giosafat Barbaro (1413–1494)
- Marco Barbaro (1511–1570)
- Alessandro Baricco (born 1958)
- Giorgio Bassani (1916–2000)
- Cesare Beccaria (1738–1794)
- Pietro Bembo (1470–1547)
- Stefano Benni (1947–2025)
- Mario Benzing (1896–1958)
- Giuseppe Berto (1914–1978)
- Enzo Bettiza (1927–2017)
- Enzo Biagi (1920–2007)
- Luciano Bianciardi (1922–1971)
- Luther Blissett (born 1958)
- Giovanni Boccaccio (1313–1375)
- Matteo Maria Boiardo (1434–1494)
- Arrigo Boito (1842–1918)
- Camillo Boito (1836–1914)
- Franco Bolelli (1950–2020)
- Vitaliano Brancati (1907–1954)
- Enrico Brizzi (born 1974)
- Giordano Bruno (1548–1600)
- Gesualdo Bufalino (1920–1996)
- Aldo Busi (born 1948)
- Dino Buzzati (1906–1972)

== C ==
- Achille Giovanni Cagna (1847–1931)
- Nanni Cagnone (1939–2026)
- Roberto Calasso (1941–2021)
- Gianfranco Calligarich (1939–2024)
- Italo Calvino (1923–1985)
- Andrea Camilleri (1925–2019)
- Dino Campana (1885–1932)
- Manuela Campanelli (born 1962)
- Achille Campanile (1899–1977)
- Luigi Capuana (1839–1915)
- Enrichetta Caracciolo (1821–1901)
- Alberto Caramella (1928–2007)
- Giosuè Carducci (1835–1907)
- Nadia Cavalera (born 1950)
- Gianni Celati (1937–2022)
- Benvenuto Cellini (1500–1571)
- Vincenzo Cerami (1940–2013)
- Paolo Cerrati (1485–1540)
- Guido Cervo (born 1952)
- Saveria Chemotti (born 1947)
- John Ciardi (1916–1986)
- Pietro Citati (1930–2022)
- Paolo Cognetti (born 1978)
- Carlo Collodi (1826–1890)
- Vincenzo Consolo (1933–2012)
- Matteo Corradini (born 1975)
- Beppe Costa (1941–2026)
- Benedetto Croce (1866–1952)

== D ==
- Jacopone da Todi (1230–1306)
- Gabriele D'Annunzio (1863–1938)
- Massimo D'Azeglio (1798–1866)
- Edmondo De Amicis (1846–1908)
- Giacomo Debenedetti (1901–1967)
- Andrea De Carlo (born 1952)
- Grazia Deledda (1871–1936)
- Massimo del Pizzo (born - )
- Silvana De Mari (born 1953)
- Sergio De Santis (born 1953)
- Raffaella de' Sernigi (1473–1557)
- Jacobus de Voragine (1230–1298)
- Paola Drigo (1876–1938)

== E ==
- Umberto Eco (1932–2016)
- Muzi Epifani (1935–1984)
- Valerio Evangelisti (1952–2022)
- Julius Evola (1898–1974)

== F ==
- Francesco Falconi (born 1976)
- Giorgio Faletti (1950–2014)
- Oriana Fallaci (1929–2006)
- Beppe Fenoglio (1922–1963)
- Caterina Franceschi Ferrucci (1803–1887)
- Ennio Flaiano (1910–1972)
- Dario Fo (1926–2016)
- Antonio Fogazzaro (1842–1911)
- Marcello Fois (born 1960)
- Bruno Forte (born 1949)
- Ugo Foscolo (1778–1827)
- Carlo Fruttero (1926–2012)

== G ==
- Carlo Emilio Gadda (1893–1973)
- Barbara Gallavotti (born 1968)
- Pietro Luigi Galletti (1724–1790)
- Fabio Geda (born 1972)
- Robert "Bobby" Germaine (1925–1986)
- Natalia Ginzburg (1916–1991)
- Paolo Giordano (born 1982)
- Cinzia Giorgio (born 1975)
- Raffaello Giovagnoli (1838–1915)
- Guglielmo il Giuggiola (16th century)
- Giambattista Giraldi Cinzio (1504–1573)
- Carlo Goldoni (1707–1793)
- Corrado Govoni (1884–1965)
- Guido Gozzano (1883–1916)
- Paola Grosson (1866–1954)
- Giovannino Guareschi (1908–1968)
- Tonino Guerra (1920–2012)
- Laura Guidiccioni (1550 – c. 1597/9)

== H ==
- Petrus Haedus (1427–1504)

== I ==
- Ibn Hamdis (1056 - 1133)

== J ==
- Fleur Jaeggy (born 1940)

== L ==
- Tommaso Landolfi (1908–1979)
- Brunetto Latini (1220–1294)
- Bruno Leoni (1913–1967)
- Giacomo Leopardi (1798–1837)
- Franco Loi (1930–2021)
- Carlo Levi (1902–1975)
- Primo Levi (1919–1987)
- Giuseppe Lombardo Radice 1879–1938)
- Carlo Lucarelli (born 1960)
- Emilio Lussu (1890–1975)

== M ==
- Niccolò Machiavelli (1469–1527)
- Alessandra Macinghi Strozzi (1406–1471)
- Claudio Magris (born 1939)
- Maria Majocchi (1864–1917)
- Clementina Laura Majocchi (1866–1945)
- Curzio Malaparte (1898–1957)
- Marco Malvaldi (born 1974)
- Valerio Massimo Manfredi (born 1943)
- Giorgio Manganelli (1922 - 1990)
- Fabio Maniscalco (1965–2008)
- Gianna Manzini (1896–1974)
- Alessandro Manzoni (1785–1873)
- Dacia Maraini (born 1936)
- Fosco Maraini (1912–2004)
- Diego Marani (born 1959)
- Lucrezia Marinella (1571–1653)
- Stefano Massini (born 1975)
- Chiara Matraini (1515–1604)
- Margaret Mazzantini (born 1961)
- Carlo Mazzoni (born 1979)
- Melania Mazzucco (born 1966)
- Fulvio Melia (born 1956)
- Maria Messina (1887–1944)
- Mina Mezzadri (1926–2008)
- Grazyna Miller (1957–2009)
- Franco Mimmi (born 1942)
- Federico Moccia (born 1963)
- Massimo Mongai (1950–2016)
- Beatrice Monroy (born 1953)
- Valeria Montaldi (born 19??)
- Eugenio Montale (1896–1981)
- Maria Montessori (1870–1952)
- Giuliana Morandini (1938–2019)
- Elsa Morante (1912–1985)
- Olympia Morata (1526–1555)
- Alberto Moravia (1907–1990)
- Marta Morazzoni (born 1950)
- Antonio Moresco (born 1947)
- Michela Murgia (1972–2023)

== N ==
- Neera (Anna Radius Zuccari) (1846–1918)
- Ada Negri (1870–1945)
- Ippolito Nievo (1831–1861)

== P ==
- Aldo Palazzeschi (1885–1974)
- Giancarlo Pallavicini (born 1931)
- Angeliki Palli (1798–1875)
- Melissa Panarello (born 1985)
- Giovanni Papini (1881–1956)
- Goffredo Parise (1929–1986)
- Giovanni Pascoli (1855–1912)
- Pier Paolo Pasolini (1922–1975)
- Cesare Pavese (1908–1950)
- Roberto Pazzi (1946–2023)
- Silvio Pellico (1789–1854)
- Sandro Penna (1906–1977)
- Danilo Pennone (born 1963)
- Frank Peretti (born 1951)
- Giovanni Pico della Mirandola (1463–1494)
- Tommaso Pincio (born 1963)
- Luigi Pirandello (1867–1936)
- Fernanda Pivano (1917–2009)
- Joseph Pivato (born 1946)
- Angelo Poliziano (1454–1494)
- Marco Polo (1254–1324)
- Vasco Pratolini (1913–1991)
- Hugo Pratt (1927–1995)
- Mario Praz (1896–1982)
- Ottavio Profeta (1890–1963)
- Luigi Pulci (1432–1484)

== Q ==
- Roberto Quaglia (born 1962)
- Salvatore Quasimodo (1901–1968)

== R ==
- Lidia Ravera (born 1951)
- Mario Rigoni Stern (1921–2008)
- Gianni Rodari (1920–1980)
- Lalla Romano (1906–2001)
- Emanuela Da Ros (born 1959)

== S ==
- Umberto Saba (1883–1957)
- Emilio Salgari (1862–1911)
- Rubino Romeo Salmonì (1920–2011)
- Emilia Salvioni (1895–1967)
- Roberto Saviano (born 1979)
- Alberto Savinio (1891–1952)
- Leonardo Sciascia (1921–1989)
- Beppe Sebaste (1959–2026)
- Matilde Serao (1856–1927)
- Beppe Severgnini (born 1956)
- Ignazio Silone (1900–1978)
- Mario Soldati (1906–1999)
- Mario Spezi (1945–2016)
- Italo Svevo (1861–1928)

== T ==
- Antonio Tabucchi (1943–2012)
- Susanna Tamaro (born 1957)
- Torquato Tasso (1544–1595)
- Tiziano Terzani (1938–2004)
- Roberto Tiraboschi (born 1951)
- Giuseppe Tomasi di Lampedusa (1896–1957)
- Fulvio Tomizza (1935–1999)
- Pier Vittorio Tondelli (1955–1991)
- Marco Travaglio (born 1964)

== U ==
- Luigi Ugolini (1891–1980)
- Giuseppe Ungaretti (1888–1970)

== V ==
- Giorgio van Straten (born 1955)
- Giovanni Verga (1840–1922)
- Grazia Verasani (born 1964), crime writer
- Giuseppe Vergani
- Sandro Veronesi (born 1959)
- Anna Vertua Gentile (1850–1926)
- Mitì Vigliero Lami (born 1957)
- Simona Vinci (born 1970)
- Ottavia Vitagliano (1894–1975)
- Elio Vittorini (1908–1966)
- Paolo Volponi (1924–1994)

== W ==
- Wu Ming

== Z ==
- Enrica Zunic'

== See also ==
- List of Italian women writers
- Italian literature
- List of Italian language poets
- Lists of authors
