= Vergani =

Vergani is an Italian surname. Notable people with the surname include:

- Andrea Vergani (born 1997), Italian swimmer
- Beniamino Vergani (1863–1927), Italian chess player
- Edoardo Vergani (born 2001), Italian football player
- Giuseppe Vergani (18th century), Italian writer
- Lorenzo Vergani (born 1993), Italian track hurdler
- Paolo Vergani (1753–1820), Italian political economist
