= Benzing =

Benzing is a surname. Notable people with the surname include:

- Enrico Benzing (1932–2026), Italian engineer and journalist
- Johannes Benzing (1913–2001), German diplomat and linguist of Turkic languages
- Mario Benzing (1896–1958), Italian novelist and translator of German origins
- Robin Benzing (born 1989), German basketball player
