= Montaldi =

Montaldi is a surname. Notable people with the surname include:

- Danilo Montaldi (1929 – 1975), Italian writer, intellectual and Marxist activist
- Frank Montaldi, American cyclist
- Valeria Montaldi, Italian journalist and writer

== See also ==
- Montaldo (disambiguation)
