= Matteo Corradini =

Italian writer and hebraist (b.1975)

Matteo Corradini (born April 15, 1975, in Borgonovo Val Tidone) is an Italian writer and hebraist.

In Italy, his work is published by Bompiani, Rizzoli, Lapis, Erickson, and others. Internationally, he is published by Penguin Random House in Germany and Gallimard in France. His books are primarily aimed at young readers and have also been published in Austria, Switzerland, Spain, the United States, and Colombia. He contributes to the newspaper Avvenire. Over the years, he has expressed his ideas through various mediums, ranging from fiction and workshops to theatrical direction. His theatrical projects have been staged at venues including Teatro La Fenice and Teatro Goldoni in Venice, the Sala Verdi at the Milan Conservatory, the Auditorium Parco della Musica in Rome, Teatro Ponchielli in Cremona, Teatro Toselli in Cuneo, Teatro Foce and Teatro LAC in Lugano, the National Theatre of Genoa, the Dramma Popolare in San Miniato, the Sala dei Giganti in Padua, the Basilica Palladiana in Vicenza, and both the Teatro Municipale and Teatro dei Filodrammatici in Piacenza.

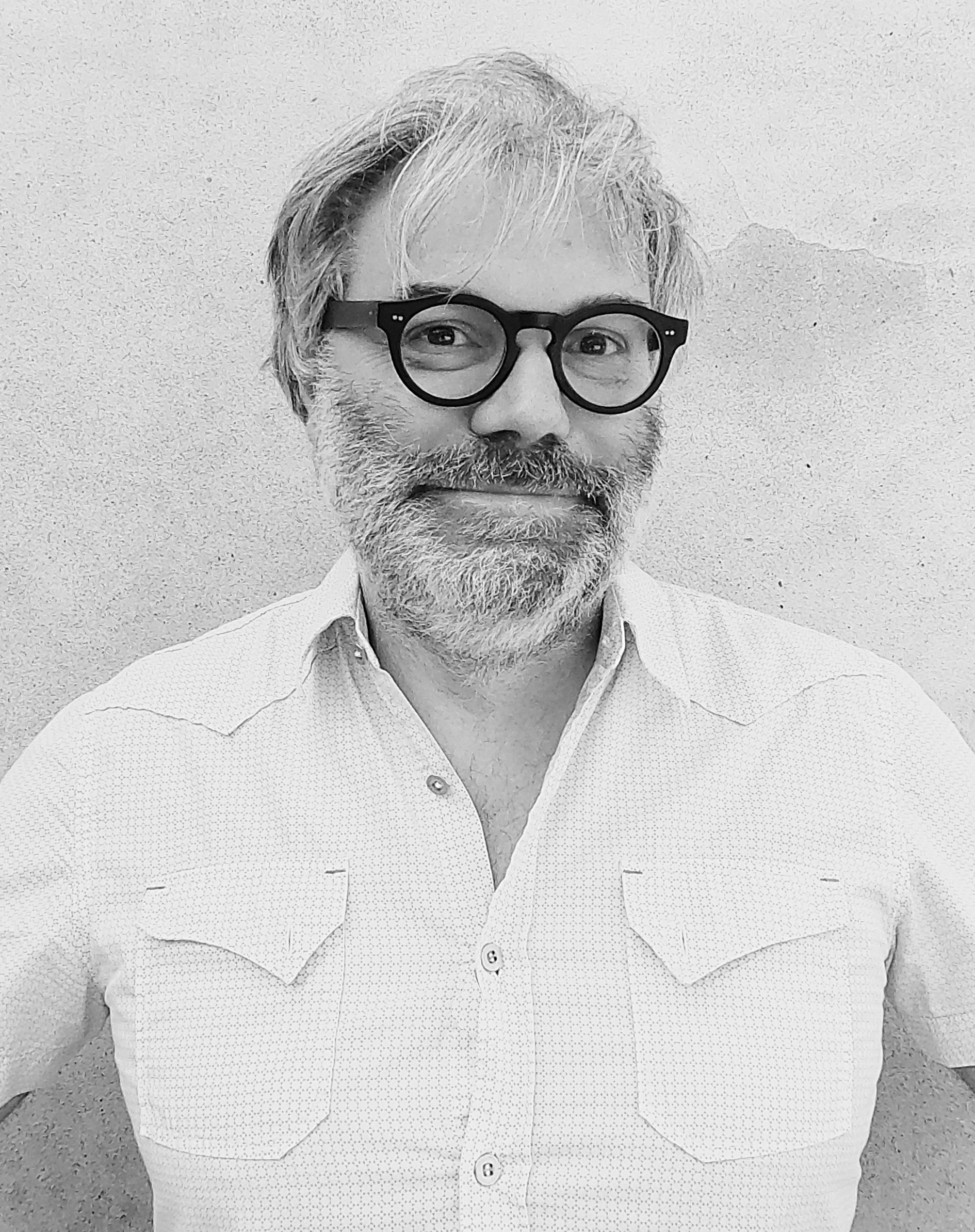
Matteo Corradini, is an Italian writer and hebraist.

As a scholar of Jewish studies, he focuses on Jewish mysticism and the Shoah. In particular, his research on the Terezín (Theresienstadt) concentration camp led him to recover musical instruments and various artifacts. In 2013, he founded the Pavel Zalud Quartet, followed in 2015 by the Pavel Zalud Orchestra and the Pavel Žalud Trio — musical ensembles that perform scores composed in Terezín, using original instruments from that era. In 2017, he was a co-founder of the Terezín Composers Institute, an international foundation based in Prague dedicated to researching and promoting the work of artists who were interned in the Terezín Ghetto. As of 2026, he is a member of the scientific committee of Figli della Shoah, an Italian association presided over by Liliana Segre.

Since 2010, he has served as one of the curators for the scrittorincittà festival in Cuneo. Over the years, he has collaborated on various events and performances with figures including Ben Kingsley, A.B. Yehoshua, Uri Orlev, Pacifico, Ottavia Piccolo, Amanda Sandrelli, Andrea Valente, Giulio Busi, Grazia Nidasio, Michele Serra, Marina Massironi, and Michela Murgia.

On January 27, 2015, he wrote the official speech delivered by Ben Kingsley at the commemoration of the 70th anniversary of the liberation from Nazi concentration camps, held at the Theresienstadt concentration camp (Czech Republic).

In 2017, he edited the new Italian edition of The Diary of Anne Frank. On October 26, 2017, he read an excerpt from the diary prior to the Juventus vs. SPAL football match, as part of an initiative by the Italian Football Federation (FIGC) to combat racism and antisemitism.

In 2018, he edited the memoirs of Inge Auerbacher, a Jewish survivor of the Terezín Ghetto. In the same year, he won the Andersen Award as a "Leading Figure in Children's Culture," and his novel Im Ghetto gibt es keine Schmetterlinge was selected by the Leipzig Youth Literature Jury as one of the six best novels published in Germany the previous year.

To mark the 90th anniversary of Anne Frank’s birth, on June 12, 2019, he organized a complete reading of The Diary of a Young Girl in the Campo di Ghetto Nuovo in Venice; 90 people took turns reading, a process that lasted 11 hours. The final segment was performed by actress Ottavia Piccolo.

In 2022, he edited the memoirs of Virginia Gattegno, an Italian Jewish survivor of the Auschwitz concentration camp. That same year, the main production at the Dramma Popolare festival in San Miniato was based on his book, Irma Kohn è stata qui ("Irma Kohn Was Here").

In 2023, he took part in the April 25th (Liberation Day) commemorations at the Teatro Toselli in Cuneo, attended by the President of the Italian Republic, Sergio Mattarella, and jazz musician Paolo Fresu. On stage, he collaborated with actress Claudia Perossini and two members of the band Pinguini Tattici Nucleari, Simone Pagani and Elio Biffi.

In 2024, he won the Andersen Award for the second time, receiving the "Jury’s Special Award" for his book Eravamo il suono ("We Were the Sound"), published by Lapis.

In 2025, he presented a musical reading—his second such performance at Venice’s Teatro La Fenice — as part of the city’s Holocaust Remembrance Day (Giorno della Memoria) ceremony. Titled Concerto per conchiglia e orchestra ("Concerto for Seashell and Orchestra"), the performance featured Nausicaa Bono (cello), Isabella Condini (viola), and Claudia Bianchi (violin). He collaborates with the Orchestra Olimpia of Pesaro, conducted by Francesca Perrotta, on the production of the show Eravamo il suono ("We Were the Sound") — based on the book of the same name — alongside Clio Gaudenzi (actress), Valeria Fornoni (director), Zeno Piovesan (dramaturg), Danilo Comitini (music and orchestration), Helen Cerina (costume designer), Vincenzo Pedata (lighting designer), Serena Sinigaglia (artistic supervisor), and Roberta Pandolfi (artistic production director). The show premiered at the Teatro Rossini in Pesaro.

In 2026, he presents his new production, Proserpina (La memoria è un tranello) ("Proserpina: Memory Is a Trap"), an original drama that weaves together mythology and the experiences of women during the Shoah, in Armenia, in Europe during the witch hunts, in Rwanda, and in present-day Iran. Produced in collaboration with the dancer by Iranian artist Saba Poori, it features video backdrops filmed in the Venetian Lagoon and has been staged in Brescia, Piacenza, Trento, and Cuneo.

== Books ==
- Rachel Hausfater, Latyk Olivier, Il bambino stella, translated by Matteo Corradini, Lapis, Roma, 2026. ISBN 979-12-5519-082-0
- Matteo Corradini, La spada non mi ha salvata, Pelledoca, Milano, 2025. ISBN 978-88-3279-119-8
- Matteo Corradini, Noi siamo memoria: didattica della memoria: percorsi su ebraismo e Shoah alla scuola secondaria, Erickson, Trento, 2024. ISBN 978-88-590-3957-0
- Matteo Corradini, Eravamo il suono, Lapis, Roma, 2024. ISBN 978-88-7874-965-8
- Marta Ascoli, Auschwitz è di tutti; afterword by Matteo Corradini, Rizzoli BUR, Milano, 2023. ISBN 978-88-17-17920-1
- Matteo Corradini, Tu sei memoria: didattica della memoria: percorsi su ebraismo e Shoah alla scuola primaria, Erickson, Trento, 2022. ISBN 978-88-590-2752-2
- Virginia Gattegno, Per chi splende questo lume; with Matteo Corradini; illustrations by Marco Palena; Rizzoli, Milano, 2022. ISBN 978-88-17-16039-1 e 2023 ISBN 978-88-17-17863-1
- Michael Gruenbaum, Il sole splende ancora: un ragazzo a Terezín; with Todd Hasak-Lowy; italian translation by Matteo Corradini, Lapis, Roma, 2022. ISBN 978-88-7874-864-4
- Matteo Corradini, Irma Kohn è stata qui, Rizzoli, Milano, 2021. ISBN 978-88-17-15432-1
- Matteo Corradini, L'étoile au coeur, Gallimard, Paris, 2021. ISBN 978-2-07-514706-4
- Matteo Corradini, Luci nella Shoah: le cose che mi hanno tenuto in vita nel buio, De Agostini, Milano, 2021. ISBN 978-88-511-8437-7
- Matteo Corradini, Veglia su di me; illustrations by Lucia Scuderi; music Orazio Sciortino; voice Amnda Sandrelli, Curci, Milano; Accademia nazionale di Santa Cecilia, Roma, 2020. ISBN 978-88-6395-336-7
- Matteo Corradini, Se la notte ha cuore, Bompiani, Milano, 2020. ISBN 978-88-301-0146-3
- Matteo Corradini, Solo una parola; illustrations by Sonia Cucculelli, BUR Rizzoli memoria, Milano, 2020. ISBN 978-88-17-10858-4 e 2021 ISBN 978-88-17-15438-3
- Matteo Corradini, Fu Stella, illustrations by Vittoria Facchini, Lapis, Roma, 2018. ISBN 978-88-7874-590-2
- Matteo Corradini, Il profumo dell'Eden: odori, spezie, idolatria nella mistica ebraica, Giuntina, Firenze, 2018. ISBN 978-88-8057-745-4
- Inge Auerbacher, Io sono una stella: la vera storia di speranza e sopravvivenza di una bambina della Shoah; edited by Matteo Corradini, Bompiani, Milano, 2018. ISBN 978-88-452-9677-2
- Matteo Corradini, Im Ghetto gibt es keine Schmetterlinge, CBJ Verlag - Penguin, München, 2017. ISBN 978-3-570-40355-6
- Matteo Corradini, La pioggia porterà le violette di maggio, Lapis, Roma, 2017. ISBN 978-88-7874-543-8
- Anne Frank, Diario; edited by Matteo Corradini; translated by Dafna Fiano, Rizzoli BUR ragazzi, Milano, 2017. ISBN 978-88-17-08615-8 e 2020. ISBN 978-88-17-08615-8
- Anne Frank, Diario; edited by Matteo Corradini; translated by Dafna Fiano; illustrations by Giovanni Gioz Scarduelli, Rizzoli BUR, Milano, 2023. ISBN 978-88-17-17864-8
- Anne Frank, Diario; edited by Matteo Corradini; preface by Sami Modiano; translated by Dafna Fiano, Rizzoli BUR, Milano, 2017. ISBN 978-88-17-08569-4
- Matteo Corradini, Siamo partiti cantando: Etty Hillesum, un treno, dieci canzoni; illustrations by Vittoria Facchini, RueBallu, Palermo, 2017. ISBN 978-88-95689-25-8
- Matteo Corradini, Improvviso scherzo notturno: un viaggio nella musica di Fryderyk Chopin; illustrations by Pia Valentinis, RueBallu, Palermo, 2015. ISBN 978-88-95689-17-3
- Matteo Corradini, Annalilla, Rizzoli, Milano, 2014. ISBN 978-88-17-07637-1 e BUR Rizzoli ragazzi, 2023. ISBN 978-88-17-18234-8
- Matteo Corradini, La pioggia porterà le violette di maggio: storia di un clarinetto; illustrations by Giorgio Bacchin; Einaudi scuola, Torino, 2014. ISBN 978-88-286-1641-2
- Matteo Corradini, La repubblica delle farfalle, Rizzoli BUR, Milano, 2015. ISBN 978-88-17-07876-4, 2018 ISBN 978-88-17-07876-4, 2020 ISBN 978-88-17-07876-4, 2021 ISBN 978-88-17-07876-4
- Matteo Corradini, La repubblica delle farfalle, Rizzoli, Milano, 2013. ISBN 978-88-17-06385-2 e 2014 ISBN 978-88-17-06385-2
- Mirjam Pressler, Io voglio vivere: la vera storia di Anne Frank; with a text by Matteo Corradini, Sonda, Casale Monferrato, 2013. ISBN 978-88-7106-720-9
- Matteo Corradini, Alfabeto ebraico: storie per imparare a leggere la meraviglia del mondo; illustrations by Grazia Nidasio, Salani, Milano, 2012. ISBN 978-88-6256-767-1 e 2017 ISBN 978-88-9381-228-3
- Tullio De Mauro e Dario Ianes (edited by), Giorni di scuola: pagine di un diario di chi ci crede ancora; with a text by Matteo Corradini, Erickson, Trento, 2011. 978-88-6137-794-3
- Matteo Corradini, Crear, Narcea, Madrid, 2011. ISBN 978-84-277-1734-3
- Matteo Corradini, Creare, Erickson, Trento, 2007. ISBN 978-88-6137-140-8
- Anna Peiretti (edited by) Le grandi storie; illustrations by Silvia Forzani; with a tale by Matteo Corradini, Editrice AVE, Roma, 2006. ISBN 978-88-8284-336-6 e 2008 ISBN 978-88-8284-336-6
- Brian Doyle, Il ragazzo invisibile; translated by Matteo Corradini, San Paolo, Milano, 2003. ISBN 978-88-215-4936-4

== Theaterography ==
- Proserpina (Memory Is a Trap) – a choreographic reading exploring the myth of Proserpina, the experiences of women during the Shoah, and the situation in present-day Iran. Featuring Saba Poori (voice and dance).
- Concerto for Seashell and Orchestra – a musical reading dedicated to the women’s orchestra of Auschwitz. Featuring Claudia Bianchi (violin), Isabella Condini (viola), and Nausicaa Bono (cello).
- Libertà, Freiheit, Liberté, Freedom – a musical reading dedicated to the Liberation of Italy from Nazi-fascism. Featuring Claudia Perossini, Elio Biffi (keyboards and accordion), and Simone Pagani (guitar and double bass).
- Between the Sea and the Sand – a musical reading based on the life of Virginia Gattegno, an Auschwitz survivor. Music by Fandujo.
- The Block – a theatrical monologue on identity, set in the locker room of a women’s volleyball team. Featuring Milo Prunotto.
- Fu Stella (She Was Stella) – a choreographic reading dedicated to ten individuals lost during the Shoah. Performed in rotation by dancers Fiammetta Carli Ballola and Eleonora Caselli.
- Fairy Tales on the Phone – a theatrical performance dedicated to the works of Gianni Rodari. Featuring Marina Massironi and Gek Tessaro, with original music by Paolo Apollo Negri.
- Wiegenlied (Lullaby) – A Lullaby for the Last Night in Terezín – a musical reading featuring original instruments from the Terezín Ghetto.
- Yours, Anne – a musical reading based on the diary of Anne Frank. Featuring Enrico Fink (flute and voice) and Marcella Carboni (harp and effects).
- The Resurrected Butterfly – a musical reading featuring original instruments from the Terezín Ghetto. Featuring Gabriele Coen (clarinet and saxophone), Enrico Fink (flute and voice), and Riccardo Battisti (accordion).
- Tango Viavai – a theatrical performance featuring dancers and live musicians. On stage: Andrea Valente and Francesco Mastrandrea. Animated backdrops by Emanuela Bussolati.
- – a theatrical performance dedicated to Gianni Rodari. On stage: Bruno Gambarotta and Linda Sutti. Animated backdrops by Alessandro Sanna.

== Acknowledgments ==
- Premio Benassi - Ordine dei Giornalisti Emilia-Romagna (2001)
- Premio Alberto Manzi (2004)
- Premio Primo Romanzo Cuneo (2014)
- Premio Leipziger Jugend-Literatur (2018)
- Premio Andersen (2018)
- Premio Andersen (2024)
- Premio La Magna Capitana (2025)
