= Enrico Benzing =

Italian engineer and journalist (1932–2026)

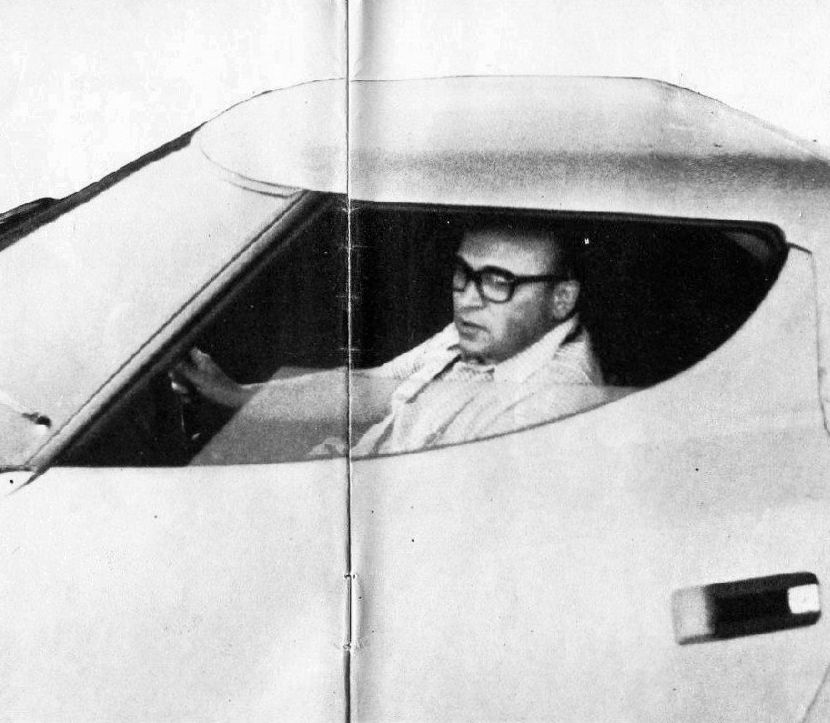
Enrico Benzing testing the Lancia Stratos HF Prototype for the Italian magazine Autosprint (1972)

Enrico Benzing (17 June 1932 – 8 February 2026) was an Italian engineer and journalist, son of the writer Mario Benzing.

== Life and career ==
Benzing wrote for the daily newspaper La Gazzetta dello Sport as Motoring-Editor and Formula One races reporter. Beginning in 1974, he wrote for Il Giornale, created by Indro Montanelli, with technical contributions about the Formula One races. In 1963, he won the first edition of the "Dino Ferrari" Prize. From 1978 to 1980, he represented Italy in the Technical Commission of the Fédération Internationale de l'Automobile. He projected wings for race cars, also Formula One, and he published twelve books: among them, monographs about single cars, treatises about engine technology, aerodynamics and the relations between aerodynamics and power in the race-cars.

== Death ==
Benzing died on 8 February 2026, at the age of 93.

== Selective bibliography ==
- Motori da corsa, Roma, 1968
- Rennmotoren im Examen. Triebwerktechnik und -Funktion, Stuttgart, 1973
- Ian Bamsey, Enrico Benzing, Mike Lawrence, Allan Staniforth, The 1000 BHP Grand Prix Cars, London, 1988
- Ferrari Formula 1, Catalogue raisonné 1948-1988, Milano, 1988
- Ferrari Formula 1 Annual, Milano, 1989
- Ferrari Formula 1 Annual 1990, Milano, 1990
- Ferrari Formula 1 Annual 1991, Milano, 1991
- Ali / Wings. Studio per tecnici e piloti di auto da corsa. Study for Racing Car Engineers and Drivers, Milano, 1992
- Dall'aerodinamica alla potenza in Formula 1. Mezzo secolo di motori in analisi, Milano, 2004
- Formula 1. Evoluzione, tecnica, regolamento, Milano, 2010
- Ali / Wings. Progettazione e applicazione su auto da corsa. Their design and application to racing cars, Milano, 2012
