= Ernesto Aloia =

Italian writer

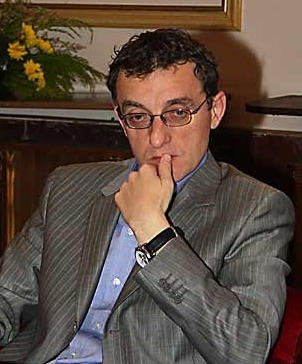
- Born: 5 December 1965 (age 60); Moncalieri

Ernesto Aloia (born December 5, 1965 Belluno) is an Italian writer based in Turin.

He was raised in Moncalieri (Turin). He was educated at The Real Collegio Carlo Alberto (Carlo Alberto Royal College) by Barnabites clerics; he depicted this background in his "Punto di domanda" ("Question mark"), the second story of the collection Sacra fame dell’oro. His short stories have appeared since 1996 in many publications, including Maltese Narrazioni, Campus, Linus and D la Repubblica. He is an editor at Maltese narrazioni.

His first stories collection, Chi si ricorda di Peter Szoke? (Who remembers Peter Szoke?), 2003, moves freely from hallucinated realism to a more intimate regard to the feelings of common people in apparently common situations hiding a sort of anxiety and perpetual bad omen. In "Pavel" for example, a young couple travel on the eve of a total sun eclipse to reach two friends who have just adopted a Russian child from Chernobyl and left the city to choose a harsh, premodern way of life.

Aloia’s second collection, Sacra Fame dell’Oro (A Sacred Hunger for Gold), 2006, appears more focused on social realism and on the specific theme of human greed for money, love, success or simply social status. The four stories of the collection, moving from the ‘50s to the ruinous financial frauds at the turn of the century draw a vivid portrayal of Italian history since the immediate postwar period. Aloia's stories are populated by both the mediocre and the truly vile - those ready to do anything in order to satisfy their "sacred hunger for gold". These are former Army officers as well as bank executives, aristocratic tycoons as well as urban proletarians. The disenchanted mood of some descriptions and the widespread sense of disillusion could evoke the name of the French Michel Houellebecq, as well as Jonathan Franzen’s and Don DeLillo’s works.

== Works ==
- Chi si ricorda di Peter Szoke? (Who remembers Peter Szoke?), 2003
- Sacra Fame dell’Oro (A Sacred Hunger for Gold), 2006
- I compagni del fuoco, appeared in April, 2007
