= Emilia Salvioni =

Italian writer (1895–1968)

Emilia Salvioni (April 2, 1895 – June 4, 1968) was an Italian writer.

The daughter of Giovanni Battista Salvioni, a statistics professor, and Rosa Schiratti, she was born in Bologna. A maternal aunt married writer Giuseppe Toniolo. Her mother died while she was still very young and Salvioni immersed herself in reading. She published her first short stories in 1918. She then published two novels in the literary journal L'avvenire d'Italia: Prima che ritorni il sole (Before the Sun Returns) in 1922 and Quella che aspettavo sei tu (You Are What I Was Waiting for) in 1923.

In 1927, after her father's death, she became librarian for the law school of the University of Bologna. She began contributing stories and poems for children to the journal Corrierino. After World War II, she founded the women's journal Serena and served as its director. She also served as editor for a series of novels for young women Collana Azzura published by the Cappelli publishing house. Salvioni also contributed articles on art, literature, theatre and cinema to various periodicals.

== Selected works ==
- La casa nuova (The New House), play
- Danaro (Money), novel (1934)
- Danaro, I nostri anni migliori (Our Best Years), novel (1934)
- Lavorare per vivere (Working to Live), novel (1941)
- Gli uomini sono cattivi (Men Are Bad), novel (1944)
- Carlotta Varzi S.A. (Her Highness Carlotta Varzi), novel (1947)
- E intanto Erminia ... (And in the Meantime, Erminia ...) (1956), received second prize for the Alessandro Manzoni Prize
