= Tommaso Pincio =

Italian writer

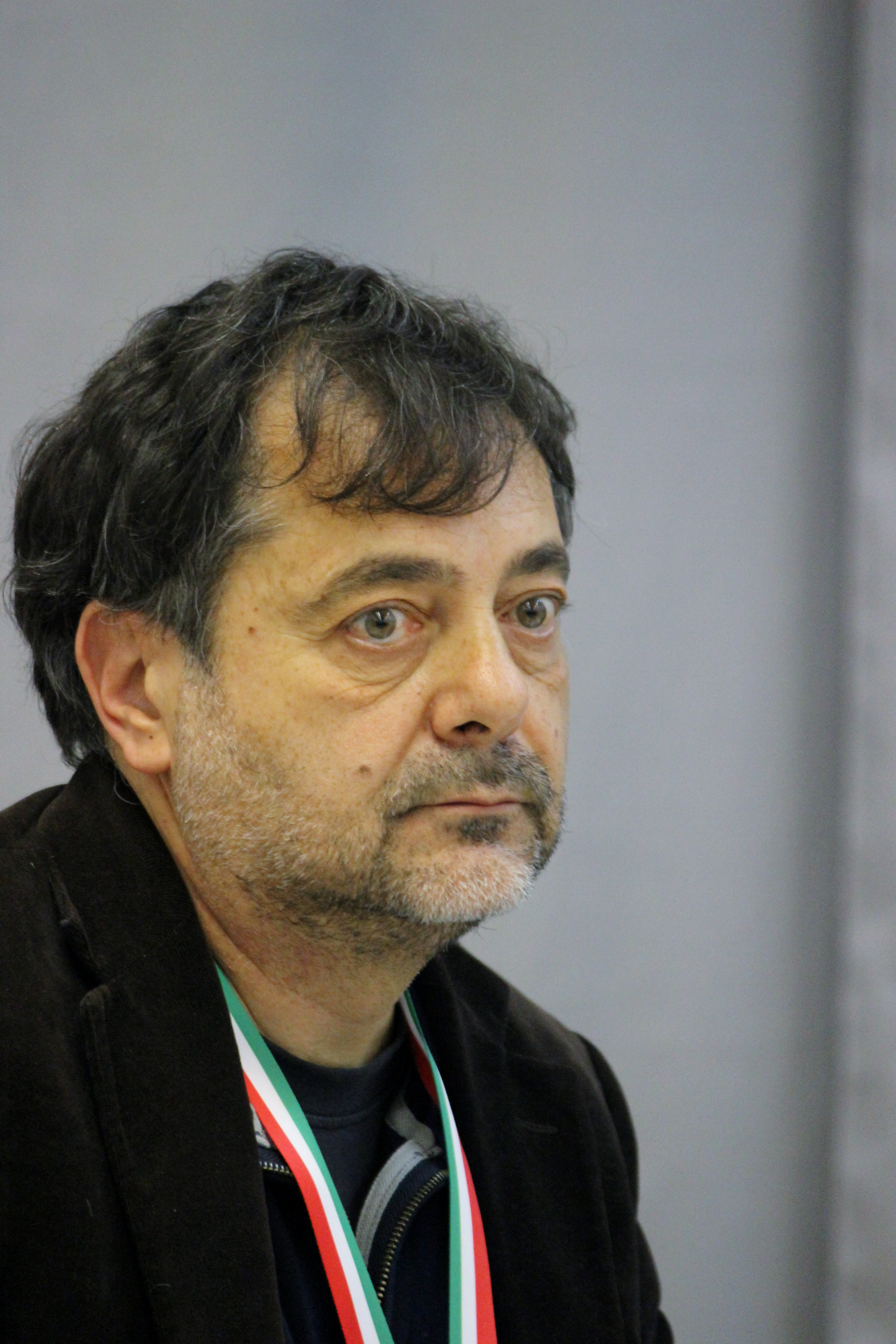
Pincio at the 20 Moscow International Fair Non/fiction 2018

Tommaso Pincio is the pseudonym of Marco Colapietro (born May 1, 1963), an Italian author of five novels, including Love-shaped story.

== Pseudonym ==
"Tommaso Pincio" is obviously an Italian rendering of Thomas Pynchon's name but this is not the sole reference for the pseudonym. "Pincio" is a hill in the center of Rome whose name comes from one of the families that occupied it in the 4th century AD, the Pincii. He claimed that he chose "Tommaso Pincio" as pseudonym just because it comes from his fiction (Tommaso Pincio is a minor character of his first novel); also, he claimed that the name "evokes a place (...). I stole its name because I love the sound of it".

== Biography ==
Even if he is not as extremely reclusive as his American namesake, very few things are known about Tommaso Pincio as a person. He was born in Rome sometime in the mid-1960s (an interview published in March 2008 describes him as a "forty-year-old Roman novelist") and graduated in Visual Arts. Apparently, he wanted to become a painter but dropped that ambition quite soon. During the 1980s he was an assistant of various artists while also working as a cartoonist. In 1991, he moved to New York City where he lived for some years. Going back to Italy, he became the director of a very well known and respected contemporary art gallery. He likely started to think about writing novels during his stay in the United States, getting in touch with the works of Thomas Pynchon, Don DeLillo, and Philip K. Dick who influenced him very strongly. His first novel, M., was published in 1999.

At present, Tommaso Pincio is based in Rome and Bangkok. He contributes for the Italian edition of Rolling Stone and several leading newspapers including La Repubblica.

== Bibliography ==
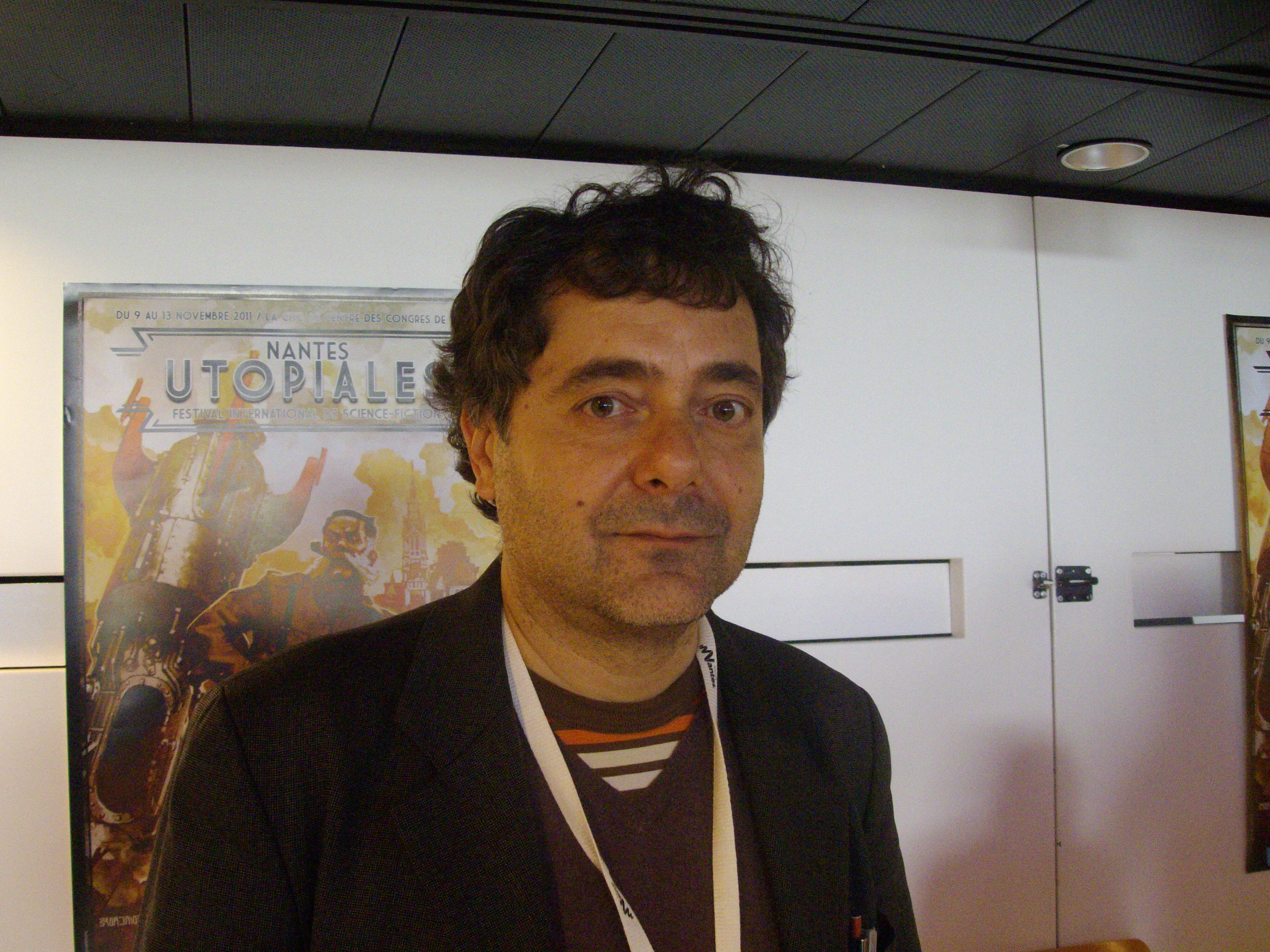
Pincio at the science fiction festival Utopiales, 2011

- Il dono di saper vivere, Roma: Giulio Einaudi Editore 2018
- Scrissi d'Arte, Roma: L'Orma Editore 2015
- Panorama, Milano: NN Editore 2015
- Acque Chete, Ascoli Piceno: Mirror Editore 2014
- Pulp Roma, Milan: Il Saggiatore Editore 2012
- Hotel a zero stelle, literary memoir, Bari: Laterza Editore 2011
- Cinacittà, novel, Turin: Giulio Einaudi Editore 2008
- Gli Alieni: come e perché sono giunti fra noi, historical essay, Rome: Fazi Editore 2006
- La ragazza che non era lei, novel, Turin: Giulio Einaudi Editore 2005
- Un amore dell'altro mondo, novel, Turin: Giulio Einaudi Editore 2002 (translated in English as Love-shaped Story by Jonathan Hunt, London (UK): HarperCollins 2004)
- Lo spazio sfinito, novel, Rome: Fanucci Editore, 2000 (translated in English as Beat Space by Acacia M. O'Connor, Rochester, NY: Open Letter 2016)
- M., novel, Naples: Cronopio Editore, 1999
