= Guido Cervo =

Italian writer

Guido Cervo (born 1952) is an Italian writer. He debuted as novelist in 2002 with Il legato romano, set in the Roman Gaul during the 3rd century. This was followed by La legione invincibile and L'onore di Roma, both featuring the same characters, including historical ones. Also set in the Roman Empire age are Il centurione di Augusto, Il segno di Attila, Le mura di Adrianopoli, and L'aquila sul Nilo.

He lives in Bergamo, where he teaches Political Economics.

== Works ==
=== The Roman Legacy series ===
- Il legato romano - Edizioni Piemme, 2002 (ISBN 978-88-566-5971-9)
- La legione invincibile - Edizioni Piemme, 2003 (ISBN 978-88-384-7063-9)
- L'onore di Roma - Edizioni Piemme, 2004 (ISBN 978-88-554-4649-5)
- Il generale di Diocleziano - Edizioni Piemme, 2020 (ISBN 978-88-566-7729-4)

=== Great Battles series ===
- Il centurione di Augusto - Edizioni Piemme, 2005 (ISBN 978-88-566-1256-1)
- Il segno di Attila - Edizioni Piemme, 2005 (ISBN 978-88-566-0295-1)
- Le mura di Adrianopoli - Edizioni Piemme, 2006 (ISBN 978-88-566-0377-4)

=== The Teuton series ===
- La croce perduta - Edizioni Piemme, 2010 (ISBN 978-88-683-6668-1)
- La battaglia sul lago ghiacciato - Edizioni Piemme, 2011 (ISBN 978-88-566-2903-3)
- La setta dei mantelli neri - Edizioni Piemme, 2013 (ISBN 978-88-683-6739-8)

=== Other novels ===
- L'aquila sul Nilo - Edizioni Piemme, 2007 (ISBN 978-88-566-0450-4)
- I ponti della delizia - Edizioni Piemme, 2009 (ISBN 978-88-566-2511-0)
- Bandiere rosse, aquile nere - Edizioni Piemme, 2016 (ISBN 978-88-566-5451-6)
