= Raffaella de' Sernigi =

Raffaella de' Sernigi (1472 or 1473 – 13 December 1557) was an Augustinian nun identified as the author of at least one 16th century mystery play.

== Biography ==
Raffaella de' Sernigi was born in Florence. Her play Rappresentazione di Moisè quando Idio gli dette le leggie in sul monte Sinai (The play of Moses when God gave him the Law on Mount Sinai) was first published some time between 1550 and 1557. A second edition was published in 1578 after her death. It was a one act play written in verse and was most likely intended for performance in convents.

She died in Florence on 13 December 1557, at the age of 84. At that time, she had been the prioress of the Santa Maria della Disciplina convent for 35 years.
