= Massimo del Pizzo =

Italian writer and critic

Massimo del Pizzo is an Italian science fiction writer and critic. From the Abruzzo region, del Pizzo teaches French Language and Literature in the Facoltà di Lingue of the Università degli Studi di Bari. He published studies on literary utopias, on fantasy and on French scientific imagination writing.

On the fiction front, he published a number of short stories in newspapers, magazines and anthologies. Many of his stories verge on the dream-like, while other are closer to science-fiction.

== Works ==
His works include:

- L'opera di Rosny Aîné. Dal realismo al naturalismo, dal fantastico alla fantascienza, Schena, 1990
- Alphonse Rabbe, la parola austera e la parola disperata, Schena, 1990
- Viaggi e passaggi. Letture di Jules Verne, Solfanelli 1995
- I microscopi dell'Altrove. Utopia, Fantastico, Fantascienza, B.A. Graphis, 1996
- Maurice Renard. Gli occhi dello scriba, B.A. Graphis, 2000
- Restif de la Bretonne e «Les Posthumes». Il diavolo in coppia, B.A. Graphis, 2001

As editor he worked on:

- Racconti di fantascienza. Il mondo attraverso la letteratura di immaginazione scientifica, Palumbo 2000.
- Altri mondi, Nord.
