= Anna Vertua Gentile =

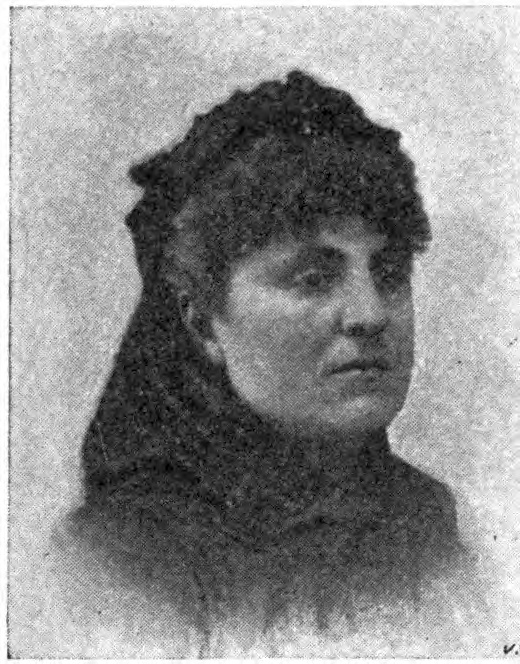
Anna Vertua Gentile

Anna Vertua Gentile (1850 (some sources say 1845) – 23 November 1926) was an Italian writer.

She was born in Dongo and began writing around 1868. Her first known work is Letture educative per Fanciulle (Educative letters for Girls) published under the name Annetta Vertua. She married Iginio Gentile, a professor at the University of Pavia. She published a series of children's stories from 1874 to 1893, following the birth of her son. Vertua Gentile also wrote novels, short stories, short plays for children and instructional manuals on conduct. She contributed to the magazines La Donna and Giornale delle Maestre. From 1905 to 1906, she was director for Fanciullezza italiana.

She died at the Istituto di Santa Savina in Lodi.

An elementary school in Codogno was named after her. An annual literary prize is offered by the Civica Biblioteca Popolare Luigi Ricca of Codogno in her honour.
