= Paola Grosson =

Italian journalist, writer, activist (1866–1954)

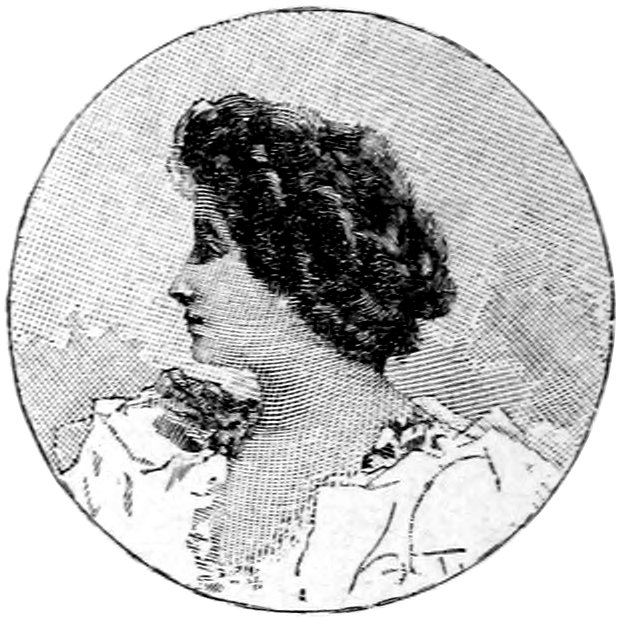
- Donna Paola, by Matilde Serao, Rome 1897
- Born: 11 January 1866; Bergamo, Kingdom of Italy
- Died: 13 May 1954 (aged 88); Quarto dei Mille, Italy
- Occupations: Journalist, writer, activist, editor

Paola Grosson also known by the pseudonym Donna Paola (or her married name, Paola Baronchelli Grosson) (11 January 1866 – 13 May 1954), was an Italian journalist, writer, activist, collaborator and editor of various magazines. She became a prominent figure of women's emancipation in Italy.

== Biography ==
Grosson was born in Bergamo, Italy, on 11 January 1866, into a wealthy aristocratic family that originated in Brittany, France and emigrated to Nice, in the south of France, during the French Revolution. Her father, Francesco Claudio, was a career soldier and her mother was Margherita Trolli. Her paternal grandfather had held a diplomatic position at the Italian court of Carlo Felice. The family's wealth allowed Grosson to receive a Catholic college education, as was customary at the time. In 1884, she married Pietro Baronchelli, a Sicilian doctor, from whom she separated immediately after the death of her son who lived only a few months.

She moved to Florence and, in 1895, made her journalism debut in Scena Illustrata, using the pseudonym she would keep for her entire career, Donna Paola. For the Florentine magazine, she wrote a fortnightly column of political, philosophical and literary comments titled “Calende e Idi” until 1914. From 1897 to 1908, thanks to her witty and critical writings, she worked as editor-in-chief of the Florentine magazine. Her career in journalism grew considerably, initiating her collaboration with numerous magazines and newspapers, such as Capitan Fracassa, Corriere di Napoli, Tribuna, Corriere dei Piccoli, Vita femminile, Fanfulla, Gazzetta del Popolo, Almanacco della donna italiana and others.

Still using the pseudonym Donna Paola, Grosson began publishing her writings in 1901 with Confessions of a Daughter of the Century. Letters of a Dead Woman, a novel of social commentary. The protagonist embodies the stereotypical condition of women, relegated to the role that men and society imposed on them throughout their lives. Her ideas on the role of women are condensed in Me and My Constituent: The Wishes and Missteps of a Future Congresswoman, a provocative text published in 1909 in the form of an interview, structured into ten conversations between the writer and an imaginary companion, in which the condition of women is intertwined with social, political and legal issues ranging from sexual education to the right to vote and the role of women in art, science and institutions.

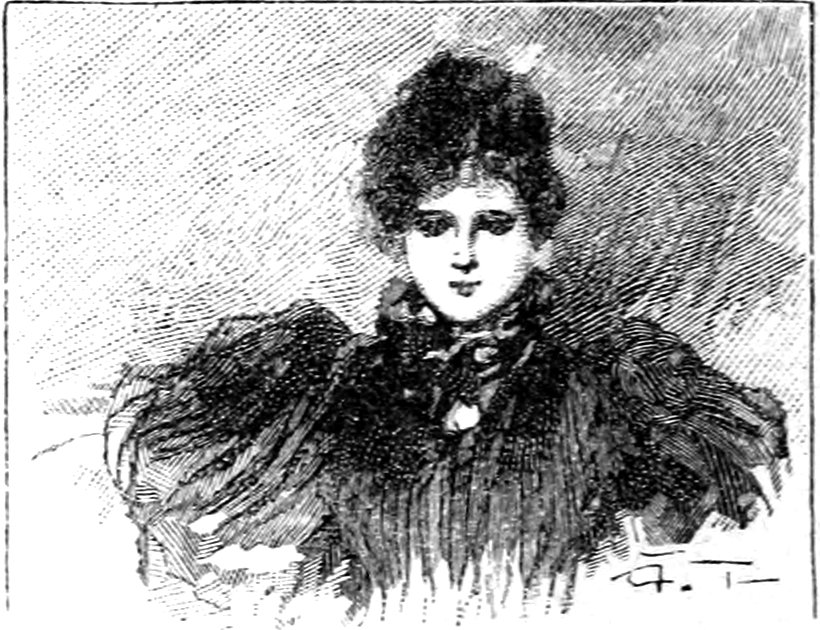
Donna Paoli (1897)

In 1911, she became editor of Fieramosca, a role she also held in 1918 at Il Popolo Romano. In 1913, her three–act comedy Sovrana was staged at the Argentina Theatre in Rome, which caused a public sensation because of her nonconformist ideas. In the early 20th–century, she became known for her strong positions on women's rights.

== Women's emancipation and war ==
With the outbreak of the First World War in 1914, Grosson's position regarding the role of women played a decisive part in the Italian social and intellectual landscape. From the very beginning, she professed to be a fervent interventionist and in favor of a massive mobilization of women. She illustrated her ideas on the war in two publications: The function of women in wartime (Bemporad, Florence, 1915) and Women in the New Italy. Documents of the female contribution to the war (May 1915 – May 1917) (Quintieri, Milan, 1917). Both works demonstrate her belief that women should become actively involved in war policies so they can achieve political and social recognition and a greater role in public life.

She also shows her nationalist focus in her Pippetto book trilogy for children: Pippetto wants to go to war (1916); Pippetto defends his homeland (1920) and Pippetto is Italian (1925), all three published by Bemporad in Florence. The protagonist of the three novels is an orphan, through whose adventures Grosson paints the socio-cultural panorama of the war and the post-war period, which was characterized by xenophobia, opportunism, the enthusiasm of volunteers, the trauma of war veterans and nationalist sentiments. Throughout the three novels, Pippetto is a role model for the younger generations during the years leading up to Benito Mussolini's fascist regime.

== Last years ==
During Italy's fascist regime, Grosson's journalistic and literary activity declined noticeably. She moved briefly to Rome but then settled in Nervi, near Genoa, where she wrote occasionally for newspapers. From this period she published The projection booth (1930), To win, you have to cheat (1932) and some stories for the Corriere dei Piccoli.

Paola Grosson died on 13 May 1954, in Quarto dei Mille in Genoa at 88.

== Selected writings ==
- Confessions of a Daughter of the Century. Letters of a Dead Woman, Milan, Carlo Aliprandi, 1901.
- These Times, published in installments in La Sera, Milan, 1903–1904.
- Me and My Voter. The Intentions and Mistakes of a Future Member of Parliament, Lanciano, Carabba, 1909.
- Always Up. Adventures of an Airplane, Verona, Baroni, 1910.
- Women and the Vote, Milan, Casa Editrice Nazionale, 1911.
- Sovrana, theatrical work, Rome, 1913.
- The Function of Women in Wartime, Florence, Bemporad, 1915.
- The Speaking Sphinx, Milan, Francesco Vallardi Editore, 1915.
- Pippetto wants to go to war, Florence, Bemporad, 1916.
- Women in the New Italy. Documents of Women's Contributions to the War (May 1915–May 1917), Milan, Riccardo Quintieri, 1917.
- Pippetto defends the homeland, Florence, Bemporad, 1920.
- Rabbit, Lionheart, Milan, Riccardo Quintieri, 1920.
- Pippetto plays the Italian, Florence, Bemporad, 1925.
- The projection booth, 1930.
- To win you have to cheat, Rome, Casa Editrice Nazionale, 1932.
