= Mina Mezzadri =

Italian playwright and theatre director (1926–2008)

- Born: 26 December 1926; Brescia, Italy
- Died: 19 August 2008 (aged 81); Brescia, Italy
- Occupation: Playwright · theatre director
- Years active: 1963–1998

Mina Mezzadri (26 December 1926 – 19 August 2008) was an Italian playwright and theatre director, remembered as the first female theatre director in Italy.

== Career ==
In 1963, Mina Mezzadri founded the Compagnia della Loggetta (later Ctb Teatro Stabile di Brescia) with Renato Borsoni, based on the Piccolo Teatro di Brescia. She would direct the company until 1969. With it, she staged classic texts by Luigi Pirandello, Georg Büchner, Anton Chekhov, and Aeschylus, as well as contemporary texts, including her own plays such as Eloisa e Abelardo (1966) and L'obbedienza non è più una virtù (1969), about the life of Don Milani.

After leaving her hometown, she worked in cities such as Genoa, Milan, and Cagliari, directing, among others, The Maids by Jean Genet and two plays by August Strindberg. She returned to Brescia in the 1990s, continuing to produce and write shows. In 1993 and 1994, Mezzadri directed Adelchi by Alessandro Manzoni, in the places where the main character Ermengarda would have spent her last years. In 1998, she staged Don Pirlimplino at the Centro Teatrale Bresciano.

== Art ==
Mina Mezzadri was the first woman to become a theatre director in Italy and was an innovator in the field, developing, among others, the document theatre genre: in the 1970s she organized evenings for specialists and curious people to participate in debates. Her work as a playwright is also considered significant. Her goal was to create a theatre free from conditioning, against the current, in contrast to power, that could be a tool for political and social analysis.

== Legacy ==
Her private library was acquired by the Fondazione Castello di Padernello and is now part of the Centro di Documentazione Teatrale Bresciano “Foppa 3” to make the volumes available to the public.

The Teatro Santa Chiara in Brescia is named after the artist, a theater space converted from a former monastery, which she herself inaugurated in 1963 with a performance of I giganti della montagna (The Giants of the Mountain) by Luigi Pirandello.

== Awards and honours ==
In 2007, she received the gold medal from the City of Brescia. In 2008, she was awarded the Premio Brescianità.
