= Petrus Haedus =

Italian priest and writer (1427-1504)

Not much is known about Haedus (1427–1504), also known as Pietro Cavretto. He was a priest from the Pordenone in Friuli, and part of the circle around Gerardo di Lisa, Cimbriacus, and Iacopo Gordino.

He wrote a book entitled Anterotica, sive de Amoris Generibus, which was composed for the benefit of the author's nephew, a student at Padua university. It is written in the form of a dialogue between Haedus, the poet Aemilianus Cimbriacus, who takes the position in praise of love, and the priest Antonino Filermo, who exposes all the evils and problems caused by love and passion. Haedeus sides with Filermo, and gives advice on love and sexuality. He covers passion, sexual attraction, marital relations, conduct and behaviour. He also discusses of more practical concerns such as jewellery and hairstyles. The work is prefixed by an introductory poem by Aemilianus Cimbriacus.

Haedus's early work Amores, written under the influence of being rejected by his beloved, can be seen as an earlier treatment of the same subject. It was clearly popular, with later editions following in 1503 and 1607.
