= Enrichetta Caracciolo =

Italian writer

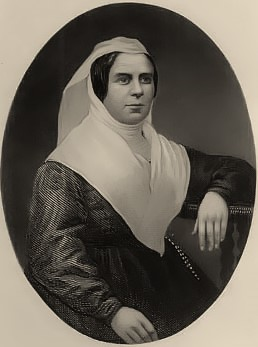
Enrichetta Caracciolo (1821-1901)

Enrichetta Caracciolo (17 February 1821 – 17 March 1901) was an Italian writer. She is best known for her 1864 autobiographical work Misteri del chiostro napoletano (Secrets of a Neapolitan cloister).

The daughter of Gennaro Caracciolo, prince of Forino, and Teresa Cutelli, she was born in Naples. When she was still young, the family moved frequently due to the nature of her father's job in government service. After his death, financial difficulties forced her mother to send Caracciolo to a Benedictine convent in 1840. She was not able to regain her freedom until 1860.

Caracciolo was made inspector for Naples' seminaries for girls by Giuseppe Garibaldi. She married Giovanni Greuther, who died in 1885. The first edition of Misteri del chiostro napoletano was reprinted six times; it also appeared in English and French translations. She also published two plays Un delitto impunito: fatto storico del 1838 (1866) and Un episodio dei misteri del Chiostro Napolitano (1883).

She was a correspondent for many magazines (including La rivista partenopea of Naples, La Tribuna of Salerno, and Il Nomade of Palermo) and, during her lifetime, received no official recognition from the Italian government, despite her notoriety and long activity. Garibaldi did not have time to sign the decree by which he intended to appoint her inspector to the educandati of Naples because he had left for the siege of Capua. Francesco de Sanctis, minister of education, after promising her a post, did not remember her. At the age of seventy, when Francesco Sciarelli wrote her biography, Enrichetta, her husband having died, was living alone and completely forgotten by her fellow citizens. She died in Naples on 17 March 1901.

Caracciolo worked as a journalist and lobbied for women's rights until her death in Naples at the age of 80.
