= Paolo Vergani =

- Born: 1750; Duchy of Milan (present-day Italy)
- Died: 23 October 1821; Pesaro, Papal States (present-day Italy)
- Occupations: Economist, philosopher

Paolo Vergani (1750–1821) was an Italian Catholic political economist who wrote on the economy of the Papal States.

== Biography ==
Born near Milan, as a student he devoted himself especially to ecclesiastical and civil law, and history. Having won distinction in theology, and been ordained priest, he went to Rome the better to prosecute his studies and soon became a Canon of St. John Lateran. It was then that he wrote the Trattato sulla pena di morte (2nd ed., Milan, 1780), the Discorso sulla giustizia criminale, and Dell'enormità del duello, which earned for him a distinguished position among the jurists of the eighteenth century and particularly contributed to the reform of the criminal law. It was also probably due to them that he was appointed assessor general of finances and commerce, and inspector of agriculture and he arts.

He wrote on the financial system of the Papal States as reformed by Pius VI (Rome, 1791), taking the position of an advocate of import duties for the protection of home industries, and maintaining that agriculture cannot be the only source of wealth in a state. He displays at the same time familiarity with the history of political economy, and also appeals to religion and the duty of Christian charity, asserting the necessity of protecting and fostering the home industries, which he argued provide occupation for a large number of people, while manufacturing and foreign importation give work to only a few. This literary activity was interrupted for some thirty years: the Lateran Chapter having been dispersed in 1811, Vergani went to Paris, where he supported himself by giving lessons in Italian, and where he died. He also published La législation de Napoléon-le-Grand considéréé dans ses rapports avec l'agriculture (Paris, 1812), Essai historique sur le dernière persécution de l'Église (1814) and Le idee liberali, ultimo rifugio dei nemici della regione e del trono. (1816)

== Works ==
- Della pena di morte. Milan: Giuseppe Richino Malatesta. 1777.
- Della importanza e dei pregi del nuovo sistema di finanza dello Stato pontifico. Rome: Lazzarini. 1794.
- La Législation de Napoléon-le-Grand considérée dans ses rapports avec l'agriculture. Paris: D. Colas. 1812.
- Essai historique sur la dernière persécution de l'Église. Paris: Égron. 1814.
- Le idee liberali, ultimo rifugio dei nemici della regione e del trono. Genoa: Stamperia Pagano. 1816.
- Discussion historique sur un point de la vie de Henri IV. Paris: Égron. 1818.
