= Giuseppe Vergani =

Italian accountant and writer

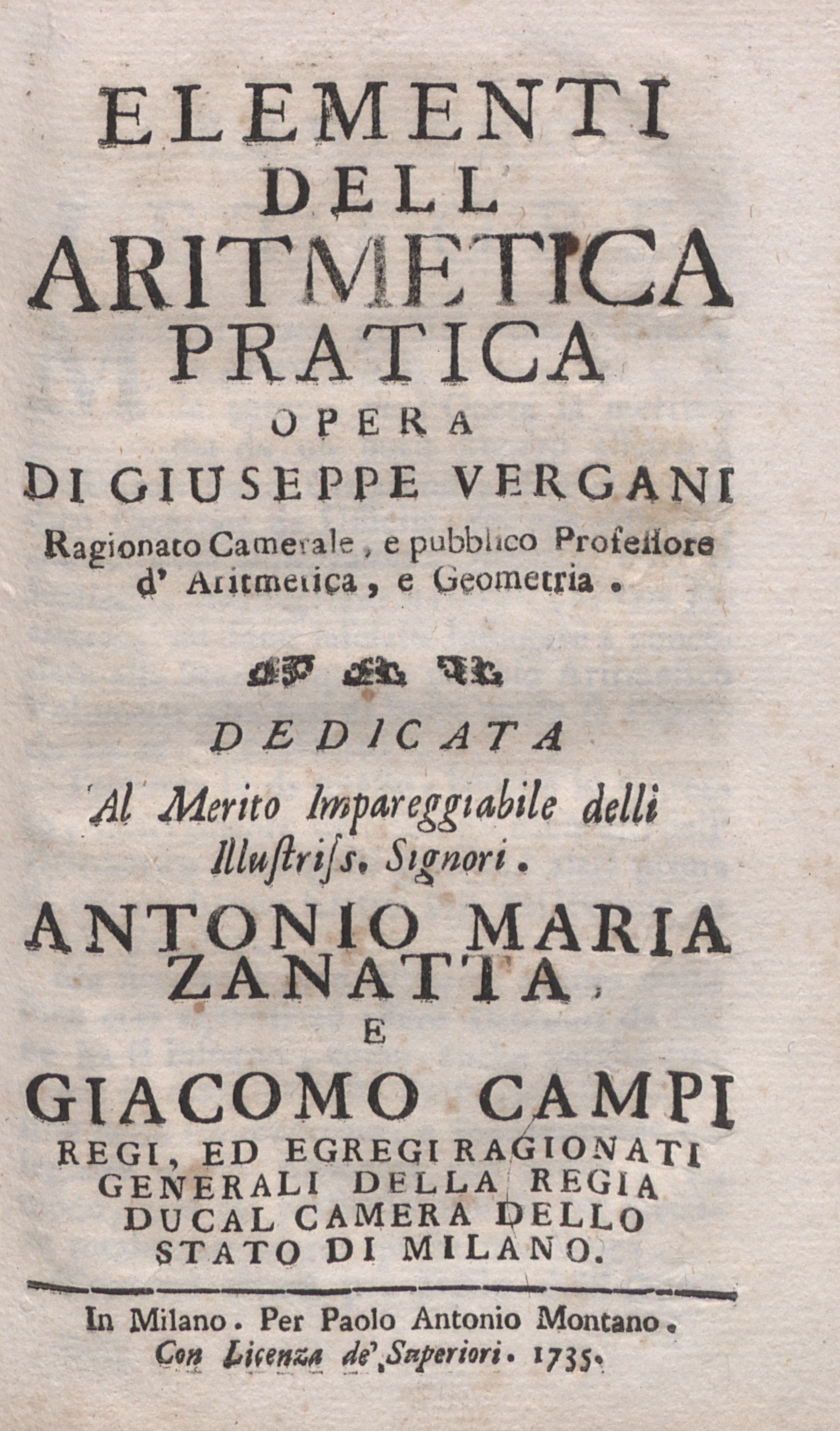
Elementi dell'aritmetica pratica, 1735

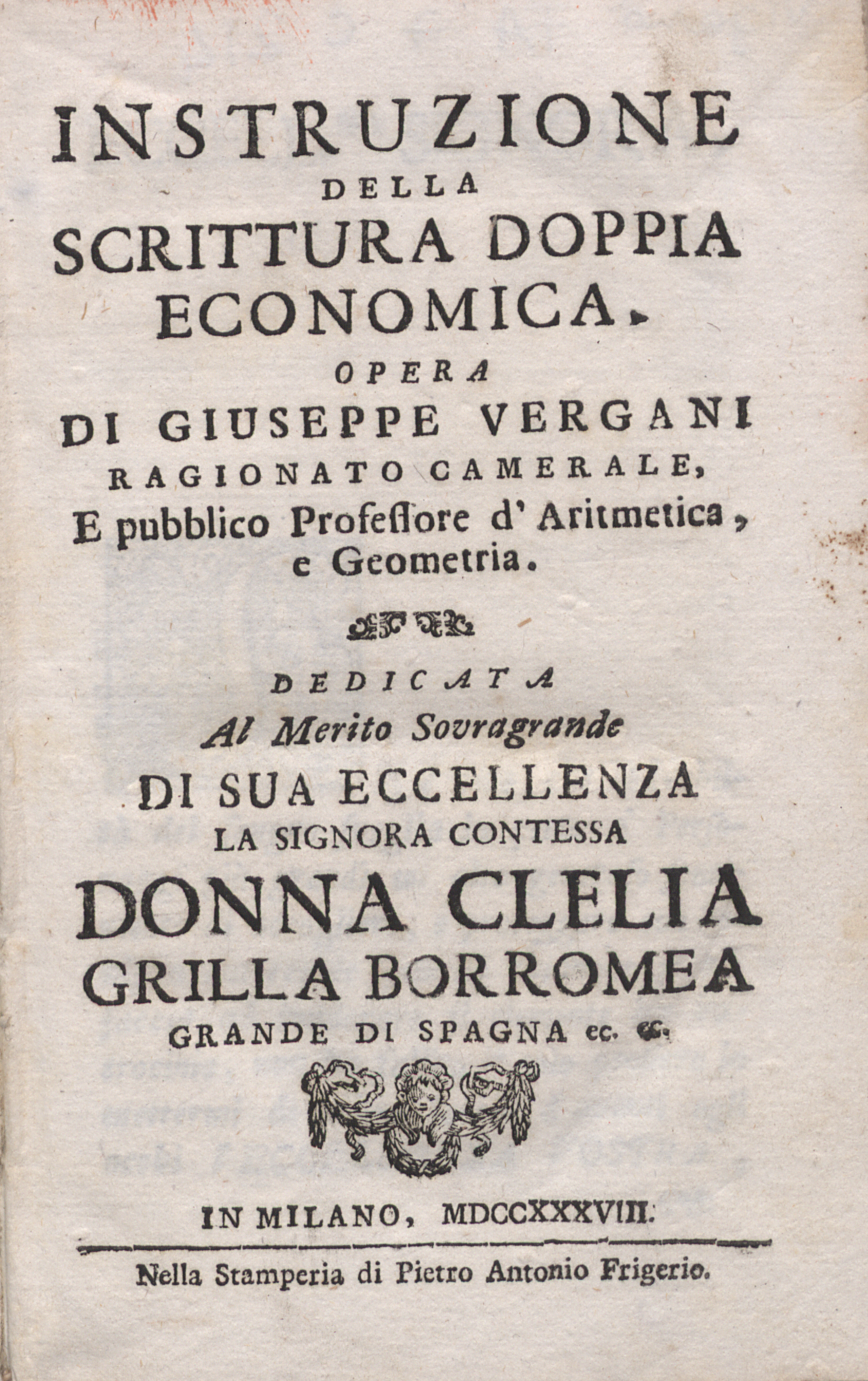
Instruzione della scrittura doppia economica, 1738

Giuseppe Carlo Vergani (fl. 1738–1741) was an Italian accountant and writer from Milan.

== Life ==
He was an official and a public professor of arithmetic and geometry.

Vergani published two significant works on accounting, which were reprinted on several occasions.

== Works ==
- Elementi dell'aritmetica pratica (in Italian). Milan: Paolo Antonio Montano. 1735.
- Instruzione della scrittura doppia economica (in Italian). Milan: Pietro Antonio Frigerio. 1738.
