= Valeria Montaldi =

Italian journalist and writer

- Born: 1949? Milan, Italy
- Education: Berchet Classical High School
- Occupation(s): journalist and writer
- Website: valeriamontaldi.it

Valeria Montaldi (born Milan, Italy) is an Italian journalist and writer.

Montaldi studied at the Berchet classical high school, later enrolled at a university and earned a degree in history of art criticism, with a research thesis on Italian advertising posters. After about twenty years of journalism dedicated to the art, cultural places and people in Milan, in 2001 she published her first novel, The Wool Merchant (Piemme), immediately acclaimed by both public and critics. The book received three prizes: the Premio Ostia Mare in Rome, the Premio Città di Cuneo, and the Premio Frignano. She later wrote several novels later on with The Lord of the Hawk (Piemme) in 2003 and The English Monk (Rizzoli) in 2006, both were selected for the Premio Bancarella; The Emperor's Manuscript in 2008, The Rebel in 2011, The Prisoner of Silence in 2013, The Stray in 2016, The Devil's Bread in 2018, and her latest work The Thread of Light in 2022.

Montaldi's stories take place in the mid-13th century, and move from the castles in the Aosta Valley to the streets of Milan, from the woods of Lombard county to the March of Treviso. She works aristocrats, commoners, monks, heretics, merchants, soldiers, witches, and inquisitors into her narrative.

Montaldi lives and works in Milan, while her works have been translated into multiple languages.

== Bibliography ==
Novels:

- The Wool Merchant, Edizioni Piemme (2001) ISBN 978-88-17-09857-1
- The Lord of the Hawk, Edizioni Piemme (2003) ISBN 978-88-17-08061-3
- The English Monk, Rizzoli (2006) ISBN 978-88-17-01678-0
- The Emperor's Manuscript, Rizzoli (2008) ISBN 978-88-17-03566-8
- The Rebel (2011) ISBN 978-88-17-05760-8
- The Prisoner of Silence (2013) ISBN 978-88-17-09757-4
- The Stray (2016) ISBN 978-88-566-5237-6
- The Devil's Bread (2018) ISBN 978-88-566-6643-4
- The Thread of Light (2022)

Essay:

- Piazza San Babila, Milan, L'Agrifoglio (1990)

Stories:

- Il sogno di Tarek, in L'estate degli scrittori, La Repubblica (2005)
- Il mistero di Piazza Cordusio, Gulliver (2006)
- Grigino il cavallino, in Le favole del Settimo Piano, RCS (2007)
- L'affresco, in History and Mystery, Piemme (2008)
- Il medaglione, in Eros and Thanatos, Supergiallo Mondadori (2010)
- Il ramo, in 365 Racconti erotici per un anno, Delos Books (2010)
- La bambina con la valigia, Avvenire (2011)
- La piccolo borghese, Satisfiction (2011)
- Venezia. A spasso nel Trecento, in Panorama Travel (2013)
- La Rosa del Pantano (ovvero lo strano caso di una donna e della sua bicicletta), in Milano mia, Polaris (2015)
