= Mario Benzing =

Italian novelist and translator (1896–1958)

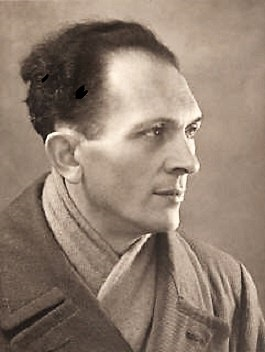
Benzing circa 1925

Mario Benzing (7 December 1896 – 29 November 1958) was an Italian novelist and translator of German origins, often forced to sign as Mario Benzi because of the period's fascist Italian laws.

== Career ==
Born in Como, Italy, Benzing settled in Milan. During the First World War, he enlisted in the Italian Army Medical Corps and in Milan, he made the acquaintance of Ernest Hemingway.

Between the two World Wars, he wrote several novels and biographies of historical figures in Italian. These figures included Messalina, Cleopatra and the Queen Christina of Sweden. As a literary translator from English, German and French, he specially devoted his work, often as first Italian translator, to Rudyard Kipling, Joseph Conrad (first Italian translation of The Shadow-Line in 1929), Jack London (first Italian translation of The Mutiny of the Elsinore in 1928), Arthur Schnitzler, Lewis Carroll, D. H. Lawrence (first Italian translation of The Rainbow in 1937), P. G. Wodehouse, Edgar Wallace, Hugh Walpole, Edgar Allan Poe, Vicki Baum, H. G. Wells (first Italian translation of The World of William Clissold in 1931), Ernst Theodor Amadeus Hoffmann, Ehm Welk, Eduard von Keyserling, Jakob Wassermann, Joseph Hergesheimer, Robert Louis Stevenson, Helen Hunt Jackson, Sigrid Undset, Edgar Rice Burroughs, Guy Boothby, William Le Queux, Sax Rohmer, Rose Macaulay, Richard Marsh, Alice Muriel Williamson and many others, showing a special sensitiveness in translating original poems in Italian verses.
