= Pierangelo =

Pierangelo or Pier Angelo is an Italian masculine given name, a compound of Piero and Angelo. Notable people with the name include:

- Pier Angelo Basili (c. 1550–1604), Italian painter
- Pierangelo Belli (1944–2026), Italian footballer
- Pierangelo Bertoli (1942–2002), Italian singer-songwriter and poet
- Pierangelo Bincoletto (born 1959), Italian cyclist
- Pierangelo Congiu (born 1951), Italian sprint canoeist
- Pier Angelo Conti Manzini (1946–2003), Italian rower
- Pier Angelo Fiorentino (1811–1864), Italian novelist, poet and
- Pierangelo Garegnani (1930–2011), Italian economist and academic
- Pierangelo Manzaroli (born 1969), Sammarinese footballer and manager
- Pier Angelo Manzolli, fictitious name for the author of Zodiacus Vitae
- Pier Angelo Mazzolotti (1890–1972), Italian screenwriter and film director
- Pierangelo Metrangolo (born 1972), Italian chemist
- Pierangelo Pira (born 1954), Italian boxer
- Pierangelo Sequeri (born 1944), Italian Catholic theologian
- Pier Angelo Soldini (1910–1974), Italian novelist, essayist and journalist
- Pierangelo Summa (1947–2015), Italian theatre director, theatre masks creator and puppeteer
- Pierangelo Vignati (born 1970), Italian paralympic cyclist

Notable people with the surname Pierangelo include:

- Claire A. Pierangelo, United States ambassador to Madagascar and the Comoros

== See also ==
- Pierangeli
- Pietrangeli
- Pietrangelo
- Pier Angelio Bargeo (1517–1596), Italian Renaissance humanist and poet
