= Bagutta Prize =

Italian literary award

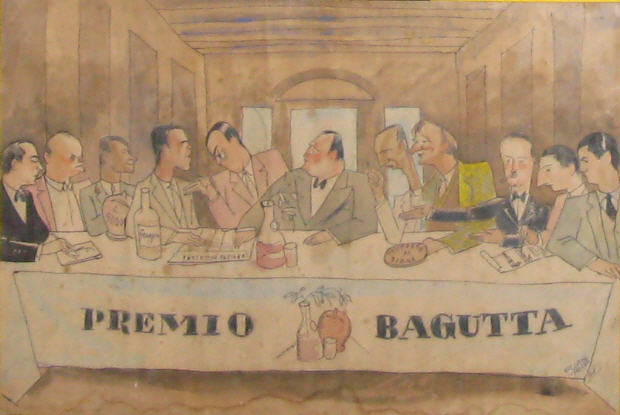
A caricature of Bagutta Prize ceremony

The Bagutta Prize is an Italian literary prize that is awarded annually to Italian writers. The prize originated among patrons of Milan's Bagutta Ristorante. The writer Riccardo Bacchelli discovered the restaurant and soon he regularly gathered numerous friends who would dine there together and discuss books. They began charging fines to the person who arrived last to an appointed meal, or who failed to appear.

At first, the funds so collected were spent on miscellaneous items, but on 11 November 1927, the group decided to use the funds to create a literary prize. They named it after the restaurant.

Other directors of the prize include Emilio Tadini, Mario Soldati and Isabella Bossi Fedrigotti.

== Prizewinners general prize ==
- 1927 Giovan Battista Angioletti: Il giorno del giudizio (Ribet)
- 1928 Giovanni Comisso: Gente di mare (Treves)
- 1929 Vincenzo Cardarelli: Il sole a picco (Mondadori)
- 1930 Gino Rocca: Gli ultimi furono i primi (Treves)
- 1931 Giovanni Titta Rosa: Il varco nel muro (Carabba)
- 1932 Leonida Rèpaci: Storia dei fratelli Rupe (Ceschina)
- 1933 Raul Radice: Vita comica di Corinna (Ceschina)
- 1934 Carlo Emilio Gadda: Il castello di Udine (Solaria)
- 1935 Enrico Sacchetti: Vita di artista (Treves)
- 1936 Silvio Negro: Vaticano minore (Hoepli)
- 1937-1946 Prize not awarded
- 1947 Dario Ortolani: Il sole bianco Garzanti)
- 1948 Pier Antonio Quarantotti Gambini: L'onda dell'incrociatore (Einaudi)
- 1949 Giulio Confalonieri: Prigionia di un artista (Genio)
- 1950 Vitaliano Brancati: Il bell'Antonio (Bompiani)
- 1951 Indro Montanelli: Pantheon minore (Longanesi)
- 1952 Francesco Serantini: L'osteria del gatto parlante (Garzanti)
- 1953 Leonardo Borghese: Primo amore (Garzanti)
- 1954 Giuseppe Marotta: Coraggio, guardiano (Bompiani)
- 1955 Alfonso Gatto: La forza degli occhi Mondadori)
- 1956 Giuseppe Lanza: Rosso sul lago (Cappelli)
- 1957 Pier Angelo Soldini: Sole e bandiere (Ceschina)
- 1958 Lorenzo Montano: A passo d'uomo (Rebellato)
- 1959 Italo Calvino: Racconti (Einaudi)
- 1960
  - Enrico Emanuelli: Uno di New York (Mondadori)
  - Antonio Barolini: Elegie di Croton, (Feltrinelli) (ex aequo)
- 1961 Giorgio Vigolo: Le notti romane (Bompiani)
- 1962 Giuseppe Dessì: Il dissertore (Feltrinelli)
- 1963 Ottiero Ottieri: La linea gotica (Bompiani)
- 1964 Tommaso Landolfi: Rien va (Vallecchi)
- 1965 Biagio Marin: Il non tempo del mare (Mondadori)
- 1966 Manlio Cancogni: La linea dei Tomori (Mondadori)
- 1967 Primo Levi: Storie naturali (Einaudi)
- 1968 Piero Chiara: Il balordo (Mondadori)
- 1969 Niccolò Tucci: Gli atlantici (Garzanti)
- 1970 Alberto Vigevani: L'invenzione (Vallecchi)
- 1971 Piero Gadda Conti: La paura (Ceschina)
- 1972 Anna Banti: Je vous écris d'un pays lointain (Mondadori)
- 1973 Sergio Solmi: Meditazione sullo scorpione (Adelphi)
- 1974 Gianni Celati: Le avventure di Guizzardi (Einaudi)
- 1975 Enzo Forcella: Celebrazioni d'un trentennio (Mondadori)
- 1976 Mario Soldati: Lo specchio inclinato (Mondadori)
- 1977 Sandro Penna: Stranezze (Garzanti)
- 1978 Carlo Cassola: L'uomo e il cane (Rizzoli)
- 1979 Mario Rigoni Stern: Storia di Tönle (Einaudi)
- 1980 Giovanni Macchia: L'angelo della notte (Rizzoli)
- 1981 Pietro Citati: Breve vita di Katherine Mansfield (Rizzoli)
- 1982 Vittorio Sereni: Il musicante di Saint-Merry (Einaudi)
- 1983 Giorgio Bassani: In rima e senza (Mondadori)
- 1984 Natalia Ginzburg: La famiglia Manzoni (Einaudi)
- 1985 Francesca Duranti: La casa sul lago della luna (Rizzoli)
- 1986 Leonardo Sciascia: Cronachette (Sellerio)
- 1987 Claudio Magris: Danubio (Garzanti)
- 1988 Luciano Erba: Il tranviere metafisico (Scheiwiller)
- 1989 Luigi Meneghello: Bau-sète! (Rizzoli)
- 1990 Fleur Jaeggy: I beati anni del castigo (Adelphi)
- 1991 Livio Garzanti: La fiera navigante (Garzanti)
- 1992 Giorgio Bocca: Il provinciale (Mondadori)
- 1993 Giovanni Giudici: Poesie 1953-1990 (Garzanti)
- 1994 Alberto Arbasino: Fratelli d'Italia (Adelphi)
- 1995 Daniele Del Giudice: Staccando l'ombra da terra (Einaudi)
- 1996 Raffaello Baldini: Ad nota (Mondadori)
- 1997 Sergio Ferrero: Gli occhi del padre (Mondadori)
- 1998 Giovanni Raboni: Tutte le poesie (1951–1993) (Garzanti)
- 1999 Fabio Carpi: Patchwork (Bollate Boringhieri)
- 2000
  - Andrea Zanzotto: Le poesie e prose scelte (Mondadori)
  - Mariano Bargellini: Mus utopicus (Gallino)
- 2001 Serena Vitale: La casa di ghiaccio. Venti piccole storie russe (Mondadori)
- 2002
  - Roberto Calasso: La letteratura e gli dei (Adelphi)
  - Giorgio Orelli: Il collo dell'anitra (Garzanti)
- 2003
  - Michele Mari: Tutto il ferro della Tour Eiffel (Einaudi)
  - Edoardo Sanguineti: Il gatto lupesco (Feltrinelli)
  - Eva Cantarella: Itaca (Feltrinelli)
- 2004 Franco Cordero: Le strane regole del sig. B (Garzanti)
- 2005 Rosetta Loy: Nero è l'albero dei ricordi, azzurra l'aria (Einaudi)
- 2006
  - Filippo Tuena: Le variazioni di Reinach (Rizzoli)
  - Eugenio Borgna: L'attesa e la speranza (Feltrinelli)
- 2007 Alessandro Spina: I confini dell'ombra (Morcelliana)
- 2008 Andrej Longo: Dieci (Adelphi)
- 2009 Melania Mazzucco: La lunga attesa dell'angelo (Rizzoli)
- 2010 Corrado Stajano: La città degli untori (Garzanti)
- 2011 Andrea Bajani: Ogni Promessa (MacLehose Press for the English edition, Every Promise)
- 2012
  - Gianfranco Calligarich: Privati abissi (Fazi editore)
  - Giovanni Mariotti: Il bene viene dai morti (Edizioni Et Al.)
- 2013 Antonella Tarpino: Spaesati. Luoghi dell'Italia in abbandono tra memoria e futuro (Einaudi)
- 2014
  - Maurizio Cucchi: Malaspina (Mondadori)
  - Valerio Magrelli: Geologia di un padre (Einaudi)
- 2015 Sandro Veronesi: Terre rare (Bompiani)
- 2016
  - Paolo Di Stefano: Ogni altra vita. Storia di italiani non illustri (Il Saggiatore)
  - Paolo Maurensig: Teoria delle ombre (Adelphi)
- 2017 Vivian Lamarque: Madre d'inverno (Mondadori)
- 2018 Helena Janeczek: La ragazza con la Leica (Guanda)
- 2019
  - Marco Balzano: Resto qui (Einaudi)
- 2020
  - Enrico Deaglio: La bomba (Feltrinelli)
- 2021
  - Giorgio Fontana: Prima di noi (Sellerio)
- 2022
  - Benedetta Craveri: La contessa (Adelphi)
- 2023 Marco Missiroli: Avere tutto (Einaudi)

== Prizewinners first book ==
- 1987 Franca Grisoni: La böba (San Marco dei Giustiniani)
- 1991 Bruno Arpaia: I forastieri (Leonardo)
- 1992
  - Antonio Franchini: Camerati. Quattro novelle su come diventare grandi (Leonardo)
  - Filippo Tuena: Lo sguardo della paura (Leonardo)
- 1994 Laura Bosio: I dimenticati (Feltrinelli)
- 1995 Piero Meldini: L'avvocata delle vertigini (Adelphi)
- 1996
  - Carola Susani: Il libro di Teresa (Giunti)
  - Alessandro Gennari: Le ragioni del sangue (Garzanti)
- 1997 Patrizia Veroli: Millos (LIM)
- 1998
  - Helena Janeczek: Lezioni di tenebra (Fazi)
  - Andrea Kerbaker: Fotogrammi (Scheiwiller)
- 1999
  - Tommaso Giartosio: Doppio Ritratto (Fazi)
  - Rosa Matteucci: Lourdes (Adelphi)
- 2000
  - Mariano Bargellini: Mus utopicus (Gallino)
  - Giovanni Chiara: L'agghiaccio (Marsilio)
- 2001
  - Silvia Di Natale: Kuraj (Feltrinelli)
  - Luigi Guarnieri: L’atlante criminale. Vita scriteriata di Cesare Lombroso (Mondadori)
- 2002 Paolo Maccari: Ospiti (Manni)
- 2003 Giuseppe Curonici: L'interruzione del Parsifal dopo il primo atto (Interlinea)
- 2004 Wanda Marasco: L'arciere d'infanzia (Manni)
- 2005 Sandro Lombardi: Gli anni felici. Realtà e memoria nel lavoro dell'attore (Garzanti)
- 2006 Ascanio Celestini: Storie di uno scemo di guerra (Einaudi)
- 2007 Pierluigi Cappello: Assetto di volo (Crocetti)
- 2008 Elena Varvello: L'economia delle cose (Fandango)
- 2009 Guido Rampoldi: La mendicante azzurra (Feltrinelli)
- 2010 Filippo Bologna: Come ho perso la guerra (Fandango)
- 2011
  - Alessio Torino: Undici decimi (Italic Pequod)
  - Daria Colombo: Meglio dirselo (Rizzoli)
- 2012 Marco Truzzi: Non ci sono pesci rossi nelle pozzanghere (Instar)
- 2013 Laura Fidaleo: Dammi un posto tra gli angeli (Nottetempo)
- 2014 Fabrizio Passanisi: Bert il mago (Nutrimenti)
- 2015 Enrico Ragazzoni: Una parete sottile (Neri Pozza)
- 2016 Nadia Terranova: Gli anni al contrario (Einaudi)
- 2017 Giulia Caminito: La grande A (Giunti)
- 2018 Roberto Venturini: Tutte le ragazze con una certa cultura hanno almeno un poster di un quadro di Schiele appeso in camera (SEM)
- 2019 Marco Amerighi: Le nostre ore contate (Mondanori)
- 2020 Jonathan Bazzi: Febbre
- 2021 Alessandro Valenti: Ho provato a morire e non ci sono riuscito (Blu Atlantide)
- 2022 Bernardo Zannoni: I miei stupidi intenti (Sellerio)
