= Balibar =

Balibar is a surname. Notable people with the surname include:

- Étienne Balibar (born 1942), French philosopher
- Françoise Balibar (born 1941), French physicist and science historian
- Jeanne Balibar (born 1968), French actress and singer
