= Borgna =

Borgna is an Italian surname. Notable people with the surname include:

- Eugenio Borgna (1930–2024), Italian psychiatrist and essayist
- Federico Borgna (born 1973), Italian politician

== See also ==
- Borga (disambiguation)
