= Digital notary =

Digital notary may refer to

- an eNotary, a notary or notary public who is able to perform notarial acts electronically.
- Trusted timestamping, an electronic method to create permanent evidence that a document or other electronic information existed in a certain form at a particular point in time.
