= Pietrangeli =

Pietrangeli is an Italian surname derived from the given name Pietrangelo. Notable people with the surname include:

- Anke Pietrangeli (born 1982), South African singer
- Antonio Pietrangeli (1919–1968), Italian film director and screenwriter
- Nicola Pietrangeli (1933–2025), Italian tennis player
- Paolo Pietrangeli (1945–2021), Italian film director and screenwriter

== See also ==
- Pierangeli
- Pierangelo
- Pietrangelo
- Pietro degli Angeli (1517–1596), Italian Renaissance humanist and poet
- Monte San Pietrangeli, municipality in Fermo, Italy
