= Beatrice Leanza =

Italian curator

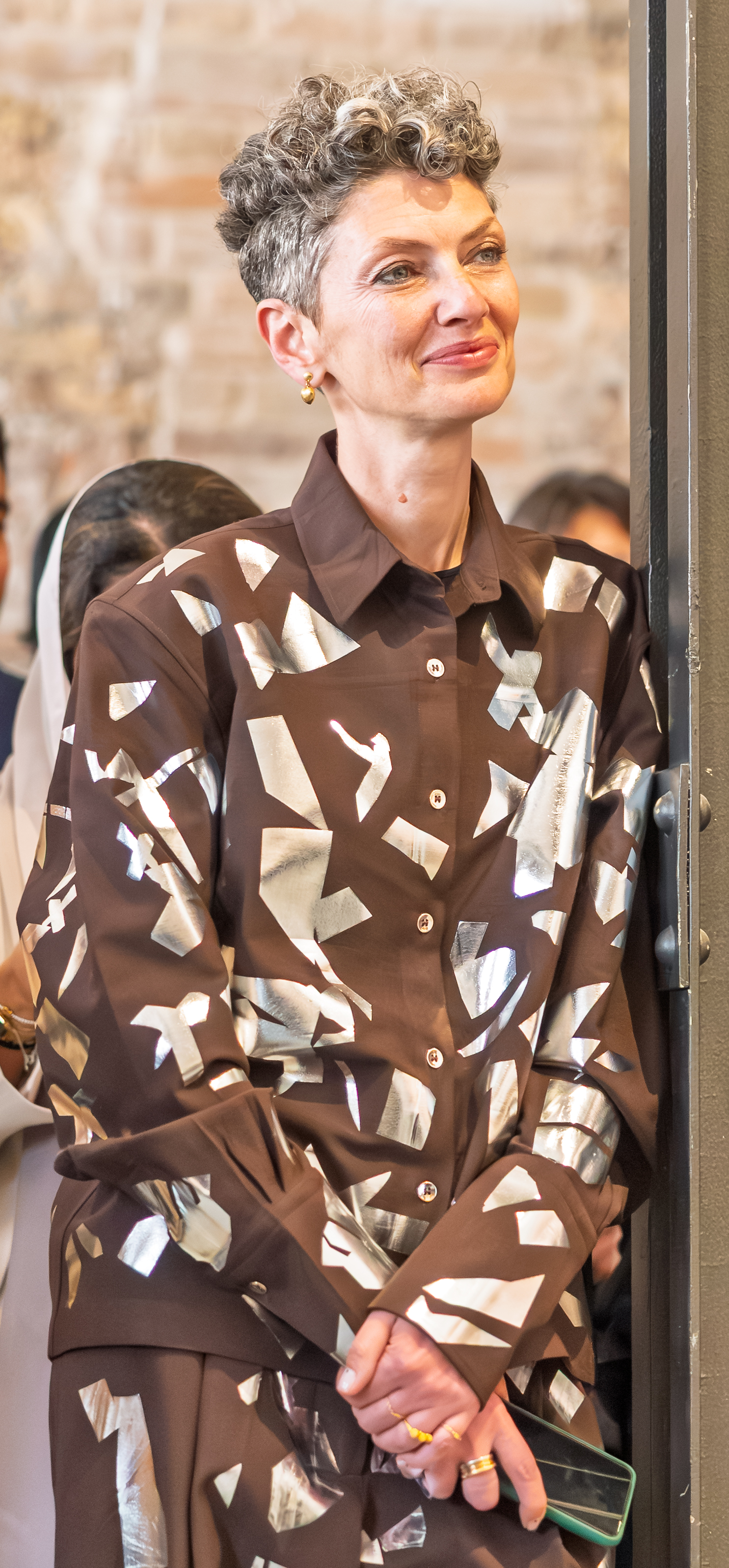
- Leanza at the 2025 Venice Architecture Biennale
- Born: 1978 (age 47–48); Milan
- Education: Ca' Foscari University of Venice
- Occupations: Curator, arts administrator, critic
- Employers: China Art Archives and Warehouse (2002–2005); Beijing Design Week (2013–2016); Museum of Art, Architecture and Technology (2019–2021); museum of Contemporary Design and Applied Arts (2023–)

Beatrice Leanza (born 1978 in Milan) is an Italian curator and museum director.

== Life ==
Leanza graduated from Ca’Foscari University of Venice in 2002 with a MA in East Asian studies.

From 2002 to 2019, she lived in Beijing. She was the director of China Art Archives and Warehouse (CAAW), a gallery founded by Ai Weiwei, from 2002 until 2005. In 2006 she founded BAO Atelier. From 2013 to 2016, she was creative director of Beijing Design Week.

From 2019 to 2021, she was executive director of the Museum of Art, Architecture and Technology in Lisbon, Portugal.

In 2022, she was named director for the Museum of Contemporary Design and Applied Arts in Lausanne, Switzerland.

After a six-months period of trial, she was not confirmed at the direction of the museum due to strategic issues.

== Works ==
- Ideas in Action: Critical Design Practice in China, Across Chinese Cities, 2016.
- DRIFT: Choreographing the Future, Phaidon, 2022. ISBN 9781838661717
