= Raffaello Baldini =

Italian poet in Romagnol language (1924–2005)

- Born: 24 November 1924; Santarcangelo di Romagna, Emilia-Romagna, Kingdom of Italy
- Died: 28 March 2005 (aged 80); Milan, Lombardy, Italy
- Education: University of Bologna
- Occupation: Poet
- Writing career
- Language: Romagnol, Italian
- Notable works: Ad nòta (1995); Furistír (1998); Intercity (2000)
- Notable awards: Bagutta Prize (1995); Viareggio Prize (1998)

Raffaello "Lello" Baldini (24 November 1924 – 28 March 2005), was an Italian poet in the Romagnol language.

Born in Santarcangelo di Romagna in 1924, Baldini was part of the town's literary-artistic circle, which met in a bar owned by his parents, and associated with fellow poets Tonino Guerra and Nino Pedretti. After graduating from the University of Bologna in 1949, he spent some years teaching in local secondary schools, before moving to Milan in 1955, where he worked as a journalist for Settimo Giorno, Rivista Pirelli, and then Panorama.

Baldini's first publication was Autotem (1967), a short comedy satirising fetishes for cars. É solitèri (1976) was Baldini's first collection of poems written in Romagnol, and was followed by Ad nòta (1995), which won the Bagutta Prize, and Intercity (2000), which is considered among Baldini's best works. As well as poems, Baldini wrote several theatrical monologues, such as Zitti tutti! (1993), and Furistír (1998), which won the Viareggio Prize. Baldini's style is described as surreal, grotesque, or dramatic, exploring the anxieties of the human condition through the monologues of ordinary people.

Baldini died in 2005. His works continue to be staged in theatres, and in 2018, Baldini was the subject of a documentary film by Silvio Soldini.

== Early life and education ==
Baldini was born in Santarcangelo di Romagna on 24 November 1924. In the immediate postwar period, the young poets from Santarcangelo gathered at the Caffè Trieste, on the Piazza delle Erbe, owned by Baldini's parents. These students rechristened the bar "the Circle of Wisdom" (Romagnol: È circal de giudêizi). Others in the circle included Tonino Guerra, Nino Pedretti, Gianni Fucci, Flavio Nicolini, Rina Macrelli, and other artists from the neighbouring countryside.

Baldini attended Rimini's classical lyceum. In July 1949, he graduated in philosophy from the University of Bologna, with a thesis on Blaise Pascal's "open morality". He spent some years teaching literature in secondary schools in Santarcangelo, where he became headteacher of the town's middle school, and philosophy in Forlì. For some time, he taught Italian at a lyceum in Rennes.

== Journalist career ==
Returning to Italy in 1955, Baldini moved to Milan to work as a writer and journalist at various newspapers. Between 1955 and 1960, he wrote for Settimo Giorno, followed by the Rivista Pirelli between 1964 and 1969.

In 1968, Baldini began as a journalist in the Milanese news magazine Panorama, where he worked for twenty years, first on religious affairs, then on cultural news. Baldini was editor of the magazine's cultural section.

== Writing career ==
His first publication and only novel, Autotem (1967), was a short comedy satirising fetishes for cars. Written in Italian, the book consists of twenty-nine fictitious letters to the editor of a magazine.

In 1976, Baldini financed the publication of É solitèri, his first collection of poems written in Romagnol. The poems describe humanity as doomed to an irremediable solitude in failure. It won the Gabbice Prize.

A further collection followed in La nàiva (1982), which reflected on the paranoia that results from self-invented opponents. Baldini won the Bagutta Prize with Ad nòta (1995), which discussed an elderly couple with insomnia terrorised by knocking at their door. Intercity (2000), a collection of 34 poems describing a train journey, is considered among Baldini's best works, a reflection of modernity and the dissonance between town and countryside, principally explored through a train journey.

As well as poems, Baldini wrote several theatrical monologues in his later life, such as Zitti tutti! (1993), which was premiered at Ravenna's Teatro Comunale Alighieri in a performance by actor Ivano Marescotti, a friend of Baldini. For Ravenna Teatro, a consortium of the city's theatres, Baldini wrote Furistír (1998), which narrated an agitated search for a building permit that would eventually not be used. The show was directed and adapted by Marco Martinelli, and won the Viareggio Prize. In the same year, Einaudi republished Baldini's Carta canta, Zitti tutti!, and Infondo a destra, a trilogy of Baldini's theatrical monologues. Carta canta premiered at the Teatro Alighieri with Marescotti on 12 February 1998.

Baldini's final collection of works, La fondazione, was published posthumously in 2008.

== Death and legacy ==
Baldini died in Milan on 28 March 2005.

Baldini's texts have been staged several times in theatres. In his lifetime, critic Pier Vincenzo Mengaldo counted him among "the three or four most important poets in Italy". Marescotti, who performed several of his theatrical monologues, said of Baldini:

People love Baldini, by now extremely popular. It's exalting to see how much people follow a show that proposes a simple reading of poems from one of the greatest contemporary poets, breaking down the traditional barriers between 'cultivated' and 'popular' poetry.

— Ivano Marescotti

In 2015, an area by the Candiano Canal in Ravenna was named after Baldini. In 2018, Baldini was the subject of a documentary film by Silvio Soldini, entitled Treno di parole (Train of Words). In 2019, Daniele Benati and Ermanno Cavazzoni published an anthology of Baldini's poets with Italian translations.

== Style ==
Baldini's poetry has been described as surreal, grotesque, or dramatic, often starting from precise details or characters from everyday life, but exposing the characters to anguish and mockery. While concerning ordinary people, his poems reflect psychological or spiritual themes, and are often written as a monologue exploring a character's inner anxieties. In this sense, according to Gerardo Filiberto Dasi, the poems consider the human condition of "fragile creatures gripped by eternal questions". Baldini said that in his works "we laugh, but with pain". A further recurring theme in Baldini's work is solitude.

In a 1996 interview, Baldini said that he wrote in Romagnol because "you can't say everything, but you can say some things better than in Italian", capturing the picturesque heritage of regional Italy. Baldini maintained: "There are things, people, situations, that happen in dialect". He believed that dialect "has no grammar, no syntax, no rules", requiring individual speakers and artists to craft their own. Matched with the content of his poems, Romagnol reinforces Baldini's ironic commentary of modernity: an obituary by Gian Luigi Beccaria reflected that Baldini "let Italian enter [into his monologues] in pieces, as an inexpressive, standardised, multimedia language".

Among Baldini's self-professed influences were Eugenio Montale, Heinrich von Kleist's Michael Kohlhass (1810), and Rainer Maria Rilke's The Notebooks of Malte Laurids Brigge (1910).

== Works ==
=== Novels ===
- Baldini, Raffaello (1967). Autotem (in Italian). Bompiani.

=== Collections of poetry ===
- Baldini, Raffaello (1976). É solitèri [The loner] (in Romagnol). Imola: Galeati. (Gabicce Prize)
- Baldini, Raffaello (1982). La nàiva [The snow] (in Romagnol).
- Baldini, Raffaello (1988). Furistír [Foreigners] (in Romagnol). Einaudi. (Viareggio Prize)
- Baldini, Raffaello (1995). Ad nòta [Of the night] (in Romagnol). Arnoldo Mondadori Editore. (Bagutta Prize)
- Baldini, Raffaello (2000). Ciacri [Chatter] (in Romagnol).
- Baldini, Raffaello (2000). Intercity (in Romagnol). Einaudi.
- Baldini, Raffaello (2001). Te sònn (in Romagnol).

=== Theatrical monologues ===
- Baldini, Raffaello (1993). Zitti tutti! [Everyone shush!] (in Italian). Ubulibri.
- Baldini, Raffaello (1998). Carta canta, Zitti tutti!, In fondo a destra [Paper sings, Shush everyone!, At the back on the left] (in Italian). Einaudi.
- Baldini, Raffaello (2008). La fondazione [The foundation] (in Italian). Einaudi. (published posthumously)

== See also ==
- Aldo Spallicci
