= Notary public (Virginia) =

Public Office in Virginia, United States

A notary public in Virginia is authorized to acknowledge signatures, administer oaths, and certify copies (excluding documents in governmental custody, e.g., birth certificates, death certificates, etc.) On July 1, 2012, Virginia became the first state to authorize a signer to be in a remote location and have a document notarized electronically by an approved Virginia electronic notary using audio-visual conference technology by passing the bills SB 827 and HB 2318.

== Responsibilities ==
A notary may authenticate a person based upon that person's documentation of their identity (such as a driver's license or identification card), by the notary's own personal knowledge of the person appearing before them, or through credible independent witnesses. A notary may not authenticate their own signature or that of their spouse, nor may a notary authenticate any document to which they or their spouse are a party. An example given is that a notary could authenticate a will, even if they are an executor, but could not do so if they are a beneficiary of that will.

== Eligibility ==
An individual who is a resident of Virginia (or a resident of another state who normally works in Virginia) may become a notary public. They must be at least 18 years of age, have no unpardoned felony convictions, be able to read and write, and fill out an application (which itself must be notarized) which is sent to the Secretary of the Commonwealth. The application used to require the applicant obtain signatures of two Virginia voters attesting to the honesty and character of the applicant; this provision has been eliminated effective July 1. The application to become a notary points out that since the persons who sign the application as voters are parties to the document, the notary who authenticates the applicant's signature cannot be either of those persons. Virginia officials request, but do not require, that the applicant include their social security number (they have also accepted Virginia drivers license numbers) on the form, for use as a unique identifier. The applicant may, by checking a box on the application, choose to remove the words "in the year of Our Lord" which normally appear before the year the commission is issued. While the applicant must swear that they have read the notary laws, there is no test or special knowledge required.

== Seal requirements ==
Virginia law requires a notary to use a seal on every document they notarize. The law specifies that when a seal is used that it must be sharp, legible, permanent and photographically reproducible. Also, it is recommended that the notary seal be imprinted or stamped just below the notarial statement. Care should be taken to not obscure the signatures or other parts of the document.

== 2007 notary law change ==
Beginning July 1, 2007, the law in Virginia changed. Changes included:

- All notarial statements require that the notary's registration number appear on the document. This is a serial number that appears at the bottom of the commission and has been on commissions issued since at least 2006.
- If no oath is required, the signer of a document may sign or acknowledge an earlier signature in the presence of the notary at the time of notarization (Code of Virginia § 47.1-2).
- The notarial certificate must be on the same page as the signatures being notarized.
- In 2008, no approval by a public official is necessary but the notary applicant must sign the application in the presence of a notary or other official who is able to administer oaths and take acknowledgments.

The new provisions effective July 1, 2008 also permitted authentication of documents for electronic commerce. In addition, the 2007 change requiring that the notarial certificate appear on the same page as the signatures being notarized was significantly limited to apply only in cases where the "notarial certificate does not include the name of each person whose signature is being notarized", per Virginia Code Title 47.1.
