= Marcello Pelillo =

Electrical engineer

Marcello Pelillo from the University of Venice, Venezia Mestre, Italy was named Fellow of the Institute of Electrical and Electronics Engineers (IEEE) in 2013 for contributions to graph-theoretic and optimization-based approaches in pattern recognition and computer vision.
