= Le Stade de Wimbledon =

French film

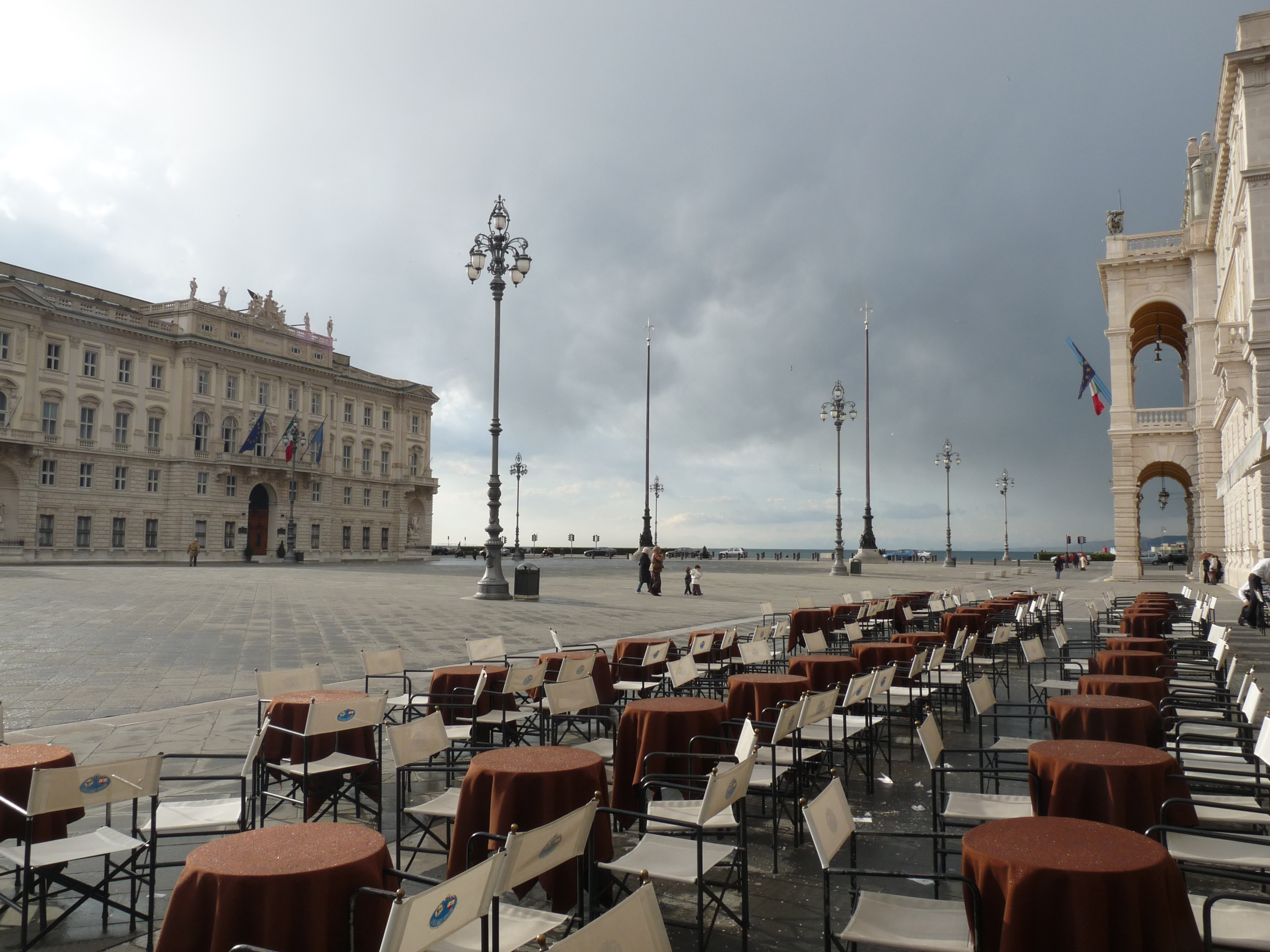
- La piazza Unità d'Italia à Trieste et le caffè degli Specchi
- Directed by: Mathieu Amalric
- Written by: Mathieu Amalric Daniele Del Giudice
- Produced by: Gémini Films Paulo Branco
- Starring: Jeanne Balibar
- Release date: 2002
- Running time: 70 minutes

Le Stade de Wimbledon is a French film directed by Mathieu Amalric, which premiered at the Locarno Film Festival in August 2001, followed by a general release in France on 13 February 2002. The director's second feature, this is a faithful adaptation of Italian writer Daniele Del Giudice's 1983 homonym novel, which, contrary to what its title suggests, is the story of a personal and literary quest in the Italian border town of Trieste. The film's main protagonist is played by actress Jeanne Balibar, who also acts as narrator.

Well-received by the critics, this work, with its distinctive aesthetic and rhythm, has enabled Mathieu Amalric to be seen by the profession and the public alike as a director in his own right in French auteur cinema, and not just as one of its leading players. The film's selection as one of the nine finalists for the 2002 Prix Louis-Delluc is just one element in this recognition.

== Synopsis ==
In the streets of Trieste, Italy, a young woman sets out to find a writer, Bobi Wohler, who never published a book during his lifetime, apart from his Italian translations of the works of Robert Musil and Franz Kafka. This ghost-writer died in the 1960s and became a figure in the literary and intellectual milieu of this border town, which was nourished by the triple cultural influence of the Austro-Hungarian Empire at the turn of the century, Italy at the beginning of its unity, and post-war Yugoslavia. Wohler frequented Italo Svevo, Eugenio Montale and James Joyce.

Over the course of an entire year, she makes four trips to the city (one per season), each lasting one day, interviewing old booksellers and people close to Wohler for her work, in an increasingly personal, quasi-metaphysical quest whose real reasons are not revealed - although it is probably academic research in nature. Her journey ends in London, England, where she meets Ljuba Blumenthal, a former companion of the writer, to whom she submits her work. After an unsuccessful one-night stand in an English pub, she wanders the deserted bays of Wimbledon stadium's center court.

== Crew ==
- Title: Le Stade de Wimbledon
- Director: Mathieu Amalric (assisted by Elsa Amiel)
- Screenplay: Mathieu Amalric and Daniele Del Giudice after his novel Le Stade de Wimbledon (1983)
- Photography: Christophe Beaucarne assisted by Ursula Sigon and Guillaume Deffontaines
- Sound: Philippe Morel
- Editing: François Gédigier, Laurence Briaud, Barbara Bascou
- Original music: Wimbledon Gates by Grégoire Hetzel (adapted from China Gates (1977) by John Adams) performed on piano by Jérôme Ducros
- Additional music: Rodolphe Burger and Thomas Lago (Beauty Mask), Gianmaria Testa (Polvere di gesso), Joseph Haydn (sonata no 58 in C major)
- Line producer: Paulo Branco
- Production and distribution: Gémini Films
- Budget: approx. 3 million francs (~ 460,000 euros)
- Country of origin: France (visa n° 98.849)
- Genre: drama
- Format: 35 mm - 1.85:1 - Dolby SRD
- Language: French, Italian, English, Friulian, Slovenian
- Running time: 70 minutes
- National release dates:
  - 24 January 2002 in the Netherlands
  - 13 February 2002 in France
  - 8 March 2002 in the United States
  - 12 March 2002 in Argentina
  - 7 August 2002 in Belgium
  - 4 October 2002 in Portugal
  - DVD release: 4 June 2007. (Includes an 18-minute "postscript" entitled Malus as Bonus)

== Cast ==
- Jeanne Balibar: The young woman
- Esther Gorintin: Ljuba Blumenthal
- Anna Prucnal: the blonde woman
- Ariella Reggio: the hospital lady
- Anton Petje: the man with the wine
- Peter Hudson: the general on the train
- Claudio Birsa: bookseller Tulio Misan
- Rosa de Riter: the dark-haired woman
- Alexandra Raffa: the student on the train
- Paul-Jean Franceschini: the man in the café
- Elio Delana: the nurse
- Duccio Pugliesi: student translator
- Ariel Haddad: the rabbi
- Giulio Kirchmayr: Israel Israel
- Marko Sosic: Anton, the conservatory director
- Alessandro Mizzi: surveyor
- Paul Cuniffe: Mr. Porter, the B&B owner
- Gail Porter: Ms. Porter, the B&B owner

== Production ==
=== Script ===
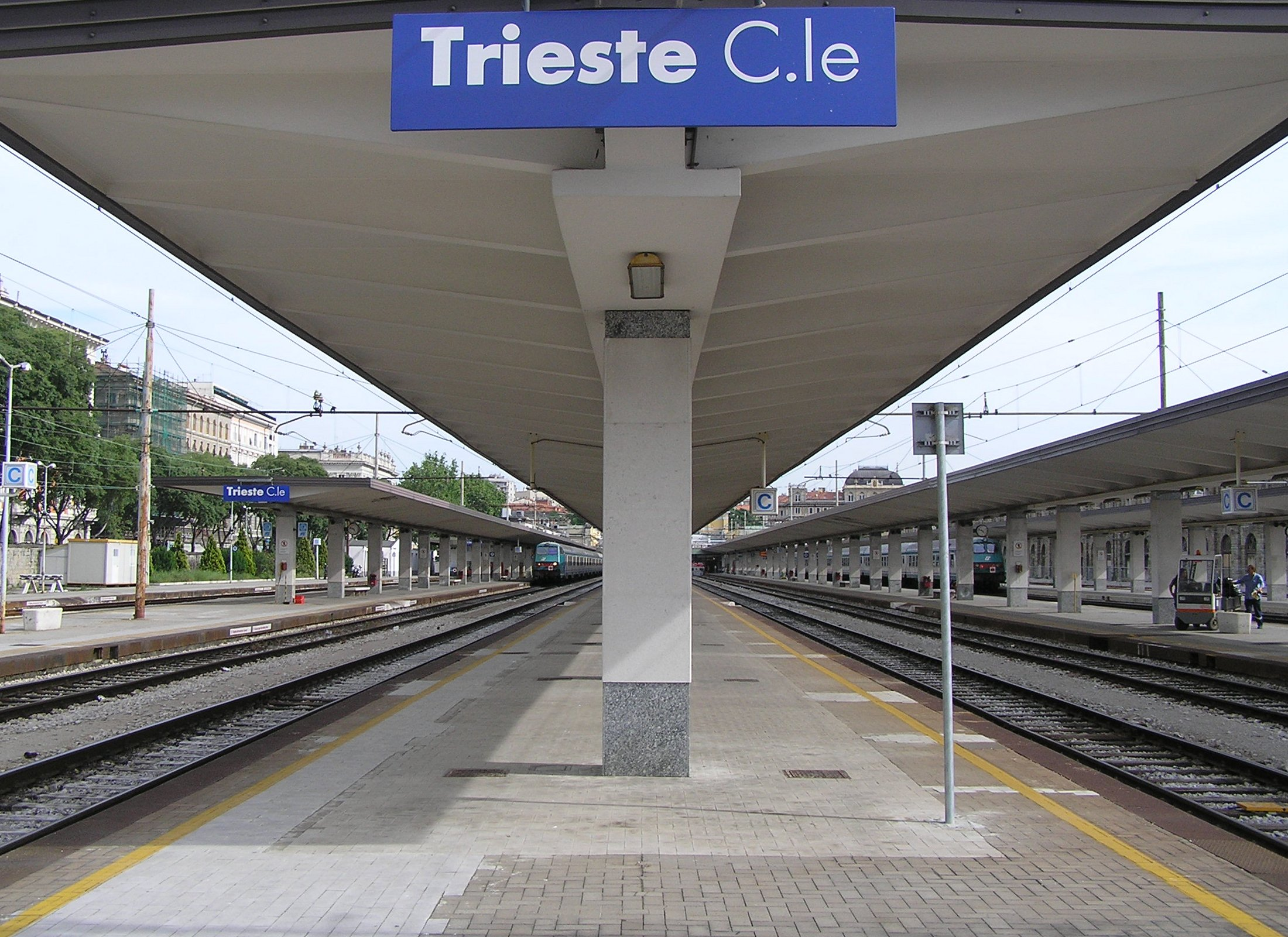
Arrivals and departures at Trieste's main railway station punctuate the work.

Le Stade de Wimbledon is Mathieu Amalric's second feature film. It is an adaptation of the novel of the same name by Daniele Del Giudice, originally published in 1983 -and winner of the Viareggio prize for first novels- but used in part in an original translation by Jean-Paul Manganaro made for the film, in which he portrays a woman, played by his then partner Jeanne Balibar, in search of a work and a writer who never published in his lifetime. The novelist and director were inspired by the real-life story of the Triestine poet and writer Roberto "Bobi" Bazlen (1902-1965), who became the film's "Bobi Wohler". For Mathieu Amalric, this poetic search is that of a fantasized and therefore necessarily unfulfilled artistic ideal but also a desire to make a quasi "investigation of Jeanne [Balibar] and light."

Mathieu Amalric's choice of novel was a matter of chance, as he decided to adapt the first book he came across at random. To do so, he picked a book from the library of the country home of Étienne and Françoise Balibar, Jeanne Balibar's parents in the same way that Jean-Yves Dubois, the main character in Mange ta soupe (1997), did in a scene from his previous film. The desire and challenge of adapting this difficult, action-free novel about an impossible quest also took shape in the director's mind, given that Trieste is "virgin territory" for cinema, with no past references and far removed from the clichés and images of Italian cities. Its use in cinema therefore opens up the possibility of new discoveries, and more strongly stimulates an imagination nourished by the diversity of this border city with its many influences, languages and cultures. Another important element of the adaptation is the filmmaker's choice to transform the novel's main character - who is a man - into a woman, following a suggestion by Jeanne Balibar, initially made in jest, to star in her partner's film, and with the enthusiastic agreement of Daniele Del Giudice.

The film was produced by Paulo Branco, who, at Mathieu Amalric's request, authorized him to begin shooting part of the film on the sly, under the pretext of location scouting in Trieste, without having yet secured the required financing or finalized the entire project. The total budget for the film was around 3 million francs.

== Filming and post-production ==
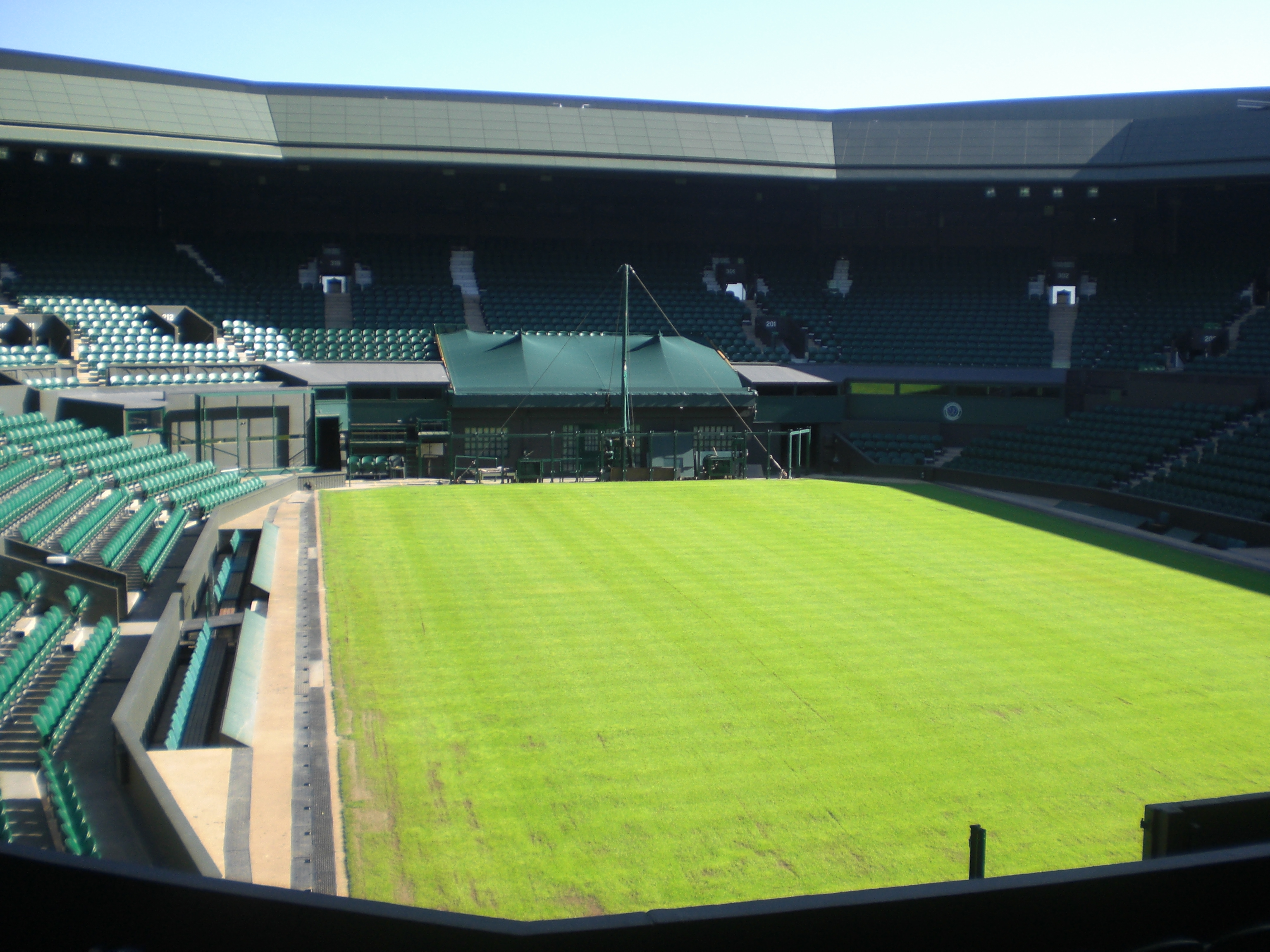
The center court of the All England Club at Wimbledon stadium, where the film ends.

Shooting took place mainly in the Italian city of Trieste in Friuli-Venezia Giulia, over a period of a year and a half, at a rate of one week's shooting per quarter, to respect the seasons mentioned, and in the chronological order of the main scenes in order to preserve these elements of the novel. A large number of scenes were shot with a very limited crew of just a few people, depending on the light and the mood of the moment on the set, whether that of Jeanne Balibar or that of the director through his desire and his view of his actress, without prior preparation or special administrative authorization. Mathieu Amalric directs his crew with his annotated book in hand and occasionally calls Daniele Del Giudice to clarify certain passages or the reality of certain locations. With Le Stade de Wimbledon, the director declares:

"I wanted to get to the heart of cinema, its core. It was like a command to myself" - Mathieu Amalric, February 2002

In agreement with his cinematographer Christophe Beaucarne, Mathieu Amalric decided to shoot in 35 mm with very low-sensitivity film, using natural light according to the conditions of the moment and without artificial lighting. In addition to the streets and squares, the main city locations used for filming included Trieste main railway station, the city's synagogue, Caffè San Marco and Caffè Tommaseo, the Galleria Fabris restaurant, Trieste bookshops including Antiquaria Umberto Saba and the city library, Trieste's unisex beach on the molo Fratelli Bandiera, Miramare Castle, and the apartments of people who actually knew Roberto Bazlen. The part of the film set in England was shot in the streets and neighborhood of Wimbledon in London, including Wimbledon Park tube station, as well as in Streatham for the B&B, and in Clapham for the pub scene. The film's final scene was shot almost in flight at the All England Club hosting the Wimbledon tournament, due to the lack of filming permission received by the production.

During editing, voice-overs were added, essentially excerpts read from the novel adapted by Jean-Paul Manganaro, as well as a few quotations from Roberto Bazlen himself. For the film's soundtrack, Mathieu Amalric asked Grégoire Hetzel to write an original score, which the composer entitled Wimbledon Gates, and which was directly inspired by a work of minimalist music, China Gates (1977), by John Adams. The piece is performed on piano by Jérôme Ducros, who had already played the passages from Bach's Partitas that formed the soundtrack to the director's previous film, Mange ta soupe (1997).

== Festival presentations and national releases ==
Le Stade de Wimbledon was first presented to the public at the 54th Locarno International Film Festival in Switzerland on 12 August 2001, closing the "Cinéastes du présent " section, and at the Rotterdam International Film Festival on 24 January 2002. The film was widely released in France on the big screen on 13 February 2002, with twenty copies distributed. The same year, it was presented in New York at the "Rendez-Vous with French Cinema" on 8 March, and in Argentina at the Mar del Plata International Film Festival on 12 March.

The film's theatrical run since its release in 2002 has been accompanied by 36,809 admissions in Europe, most of them in France with 34,277 spectators.

On 4 June 2007 Cahiers du cinéma published the film on a double DVD in the "Deux films de..." collection, along with the director's first film, Mange ta soupe (1997). The film is complemented by an 18-minute bonus documentary, a veritable "work in its own right" entitled Malus, presenting the creative work surrounding the film - preparatory notes, fittings, location scouting, and an interview with the Italian novelist - and a "mishap" experienced by Mathieu Amalric during the editing and mixing of Wimbledon Stadium.

== Critical reception ==
Mathieu Amalric's adaptation of Daniele Del Giudice's novel was judged to be convincingly faithful to the spirit of the book. For Les Inrocks, the Wimbledon Stadium is a "strange, poetic work", with which the film critic, enthusiastically, considers that Mathieu Amalric has totally succeeded in "overcoming the formidable hurdle of the second film, but also [given] confirmation of a true filmmaker's eye". This observation is shared in the same journal by Serge Kaganski, for whom Amalric is no longer just an actor, but has become a "very good filmmaker" who must be perceived as such "in the eyes of the public", as well as by the editors of Cahiers du cinéma and Positif, for whom this film confirms the hopes placed in Amalric as a filmmaker. Jean Antoine Gili, Positif's specialist on Italian cinema, adds that this work achieves a beautiful "narrative development" and the "portrait of a character in hollow" without falling into "pure intellectual data", thanks to a "figurative concretization" that relies on the way Trieste is filmed as a central subject "that secretes mystery and strangeness", while Cahiers du cinéma similarly concludes that, to the question "how do you film emptiness?" the director proposes the solution of permanent displacements in space and time within the city, where the "own pulsation" of each place is depicted. Philippe Azoury, the first French critic to review the film at Locarno, wrote in Libération that he "came away from this journey full of a beautiful, dark Adriatic melancholy". In their 2003 Annuel du cinéma, Les Fiches du cinéma describe the film as a "philosophical and literary quest for the self" served up by a "magnificent Jeanne Balibar, both determined and dreamy". The book underlines the director's desire to make a work about "the emptiness and vertigo of decided non-creativity", which results in a film that is "mobile, physical, yet introspective and contemplative, with a powerful charm", and is particularly enthusiastic about its "rigorous direction" and "beautiful framing and lighting". Télérama magazine sees in this film a "surprising self-portrait of the filmmaker as... Jeanne Balibar", pointing out that this work reveals the filmmaker's "sort of maladjustment to practical reality, a reluctance to inhabit the immediate present in favor of the before or after". In a similar vein, the weekly highlights the work of cinematographer Christophe Beaucarne, whose "elegant framing and natural lighting", combined with that of composer Grégoire Hetzel, help create a "beautiful film on its own" with "acute sensations". The work's mastery of shots has been compared to that of films by Michelangelo Antonioni or Wim Wenders.

Relatively negative, the critic from La Dépêche du Midi considers that the director's approach of making "cinema out of nothing [...] isn't always enough", resulting in "emptiness" despite the "elegance [and] 'intelligence'" of his filming style. The same reticence was expressed in similar terms in L'Express on the DVD release in 2007, which noted that the film "lacks [a] little surprise to be completely convincing", despite the luminous presence of Jeanne Balibar.

In the English-speaking world, reviews are divided. In the UK, Le Stade de Wimbledon was well received, described as "a typically European film of ideas and mood, which is a beautiful, open, enigmatic fable", aptly likening its ending to that of Michelangelo Antonioni's Blow-Up (1966). When the film was released in the U.S. in March 2002 at the "Rendez-Vous" Festival of French Cinema at Lincoln Center in New York, the reception was more mixed. On the one hand, IndieWire's critic enthused about the film, calling it "the most valuable discovery [of the festival], [...] small on plot, big on ideas", noting in particular the "sincere, delicate style, genuine tenderness [...] or deep love for each of the characters". In contrast, Variety considers the film "an arty treat that seems to outlast its meager 70 minutes" made for independent film festivals, judging - in a major departure - that the "painterly photography is either unnecessarily oblique or captivatingly mysterious".

== Distinction ==
Year	Ceremony or award	Nomination
2002	Prix Louis-Delluc	Best filmnote

== Analysis ==
=== Book survey ===
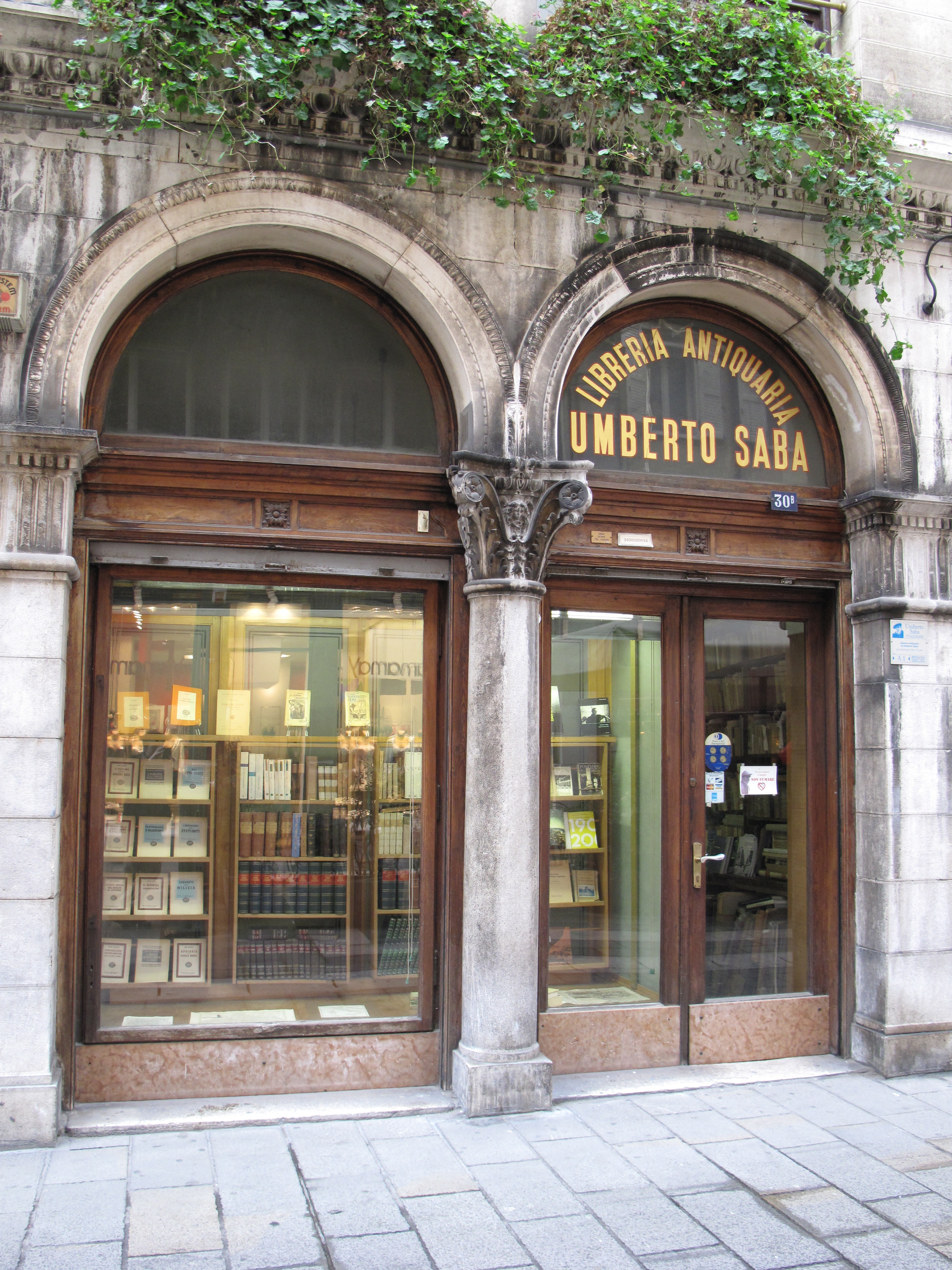
The Umberto Saba bookshop on Via San Nicolò in Trieste, one of Italy's most important literary venues and one of the film's focal points.

While the Wimbledon Stadium remains a film of self-inspection - described by one academic in 2009 as Mathieu Amalric's "autoscopy by proxy", an analysis confirmed by Amalric himself - in which an author examines the need for, and motivations behind, literary and, more broadly, artistic creation, it is also, on the filmmaker's part, a film in the negative of his previous, highly autobiographical opus, Mange ta soupe (Eat Your Soup), released in 1997. In contrast, both are about books and their approach: the overflow of books in the first feature, to the point of suffocation in the literal sense with the collapse of a library and the burial of the main character, is followed by an absence of books in the second; the second film, on the other hand, replaces a desperate search for non-existent books and an "en-quête" into an unpublished writer in a city paradoxically teeming with illustrious literary ghosts; a film "en plein" on the question of remembrance is followed by a film "en creux" on the search for a missing person. To this can be added the film's transformation of the name "Bazlen" into "Wohler", which is highly significant phonetically, without it being obvious to whom it belongs - the writer Bazlen, the novelist Del Giudice or the filmmaker Amalric (or all of them at once), while noting that the latter has often declared, in his own regard, that he acts like a "vampire" in the making of his films.

Filmmaker Arnaud Larrieu offers an analysis in which he considers this work to be a "portrait film", but one that is constructed in a complex way, since it is not played out as a two-way mirror (that of the model and the artist depicting him), but as a four-way one, involving the young woman and her quest for authorship, as well as the city of Trieste and the filmmaker's own quest. The magazines Positif and Télérama make a similar analysis, calling the transposition of Daniele Del Giudice into Mathieu Amalric and himself into Jeanne Balibar "highly productive of meaning ". As she is not named once in the entire film, just as the narrator-investigator was not named in the novel, "Elle" is all the more able to embody several beings at once, in a reflexive manner, as her person is further effaced behind the meaning, nature and object of her literary quest. Apart from the apparent solitude, perhaps even emotional solitude, that surrounds the investigator, nothing indicative of her private life, experiences or personality shines through, thus further reinforcing the pre-eminence of the film's fundamental object (the quest) over its subject (the woman who carries it out). To transpose this into the image, Mathieu Amalric imposes on the viewer, from the very start of the film, to follow, a few meters back, the evolution of the different stages of this search, filming Jeanne Balibar from behind as she moves or in long travellings. To do this, he uses the cinematic codes of the detective story: a quasi-police investigation, with written or voice-over reports; a transformation of Bobi Wohler's character into a virtual MacGuffin; strolls through the city streets, like a detective in a raincoat.

=== The importance of location and light ===
To address these themes, the city of Trieste, with its particularly rich literary past, offers a significant setting used by Daniele Del Giudice at the heart of his novel, and fully preserved by the director for his film, which maintains the mystery of the city, its "own palpitations" with multiple confluences and influences, marked by the history of Mitteleuropa. However, despite the softness of the lights and the passing of the seasons, the mystery of Triest is not devoid of an element of anguish, which is particularly evident in the windsurfing scene at sea, where the narrator suddenly sees a figurative - and perhaps reflective of her personal life - abyss opening up beneath her, as indicated by her cry of anguish in the London night after a failed evening in a pub - that marks a climax with the state of her own research and her confrontation with the absence of totally satisfactory answers and reasons to explain Bobi Wohler/Bazlen's literary rejection. This state of unaccomplishment, this fictional psychological stage that gave the novel its title, reaches a climax at the end of the narrator's quest, when she finds herself facing the emptiness of the Wimbledon tennis center court (and alone with herself), where even the lines of the playing court are absent, like a totally blank page, to be written or never written. Jean-Paul Manganaro, in a study published in 2001, underlines this constancy of "impediment, failure and incompletion" in Daniele Del Giudice's work, which is marked by "wandering, the wandering of the narrator in her own history" within the research she has undertaken - which brings more questions than answers, and whose subject, Bazlen, becomes "vanifie" as it progresses - and by the "fractioning" of spaces, whether place or journey, into smaller spaces.

Lights on Trieste's port facilities, towards the Audace molo.

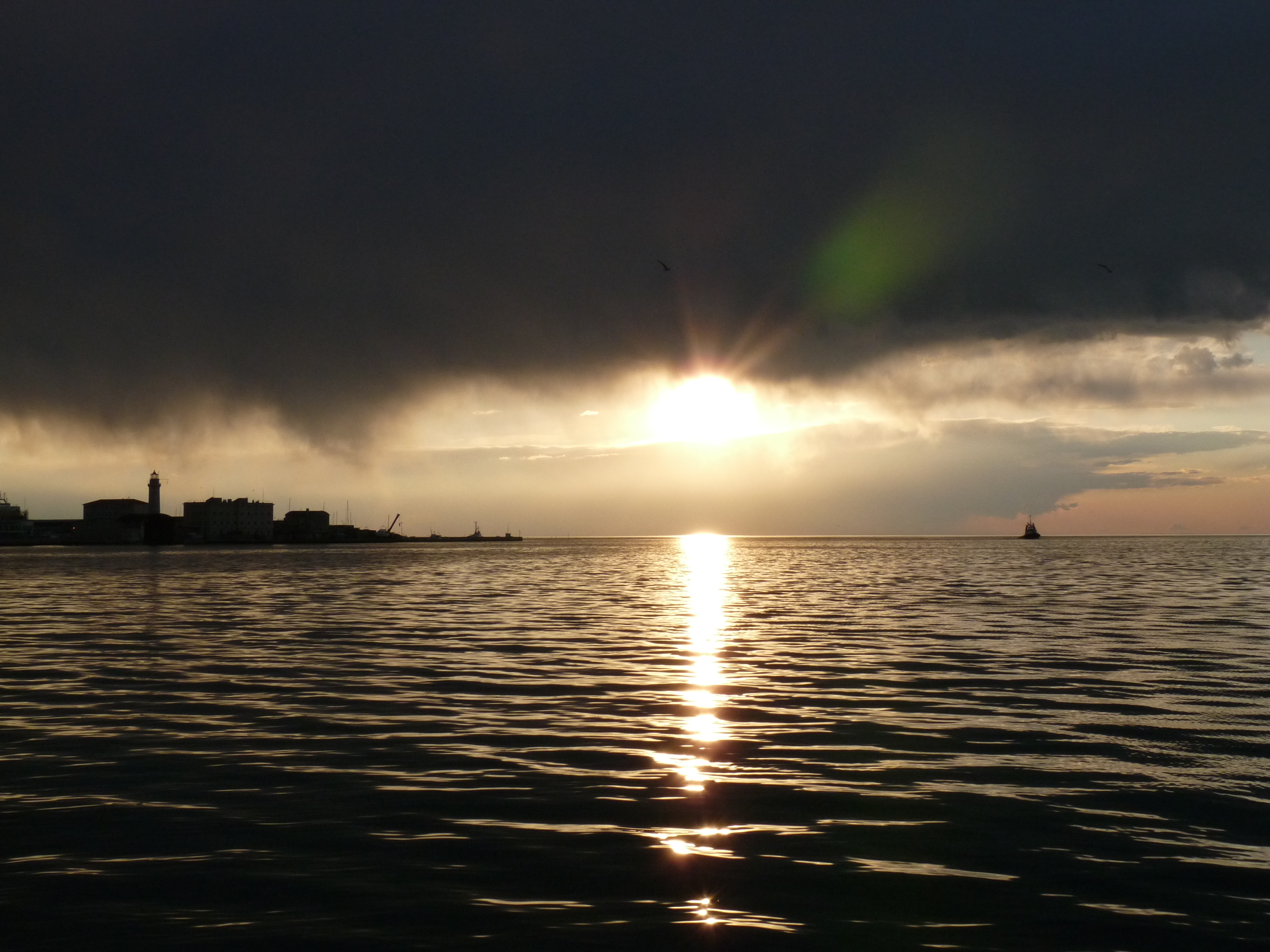

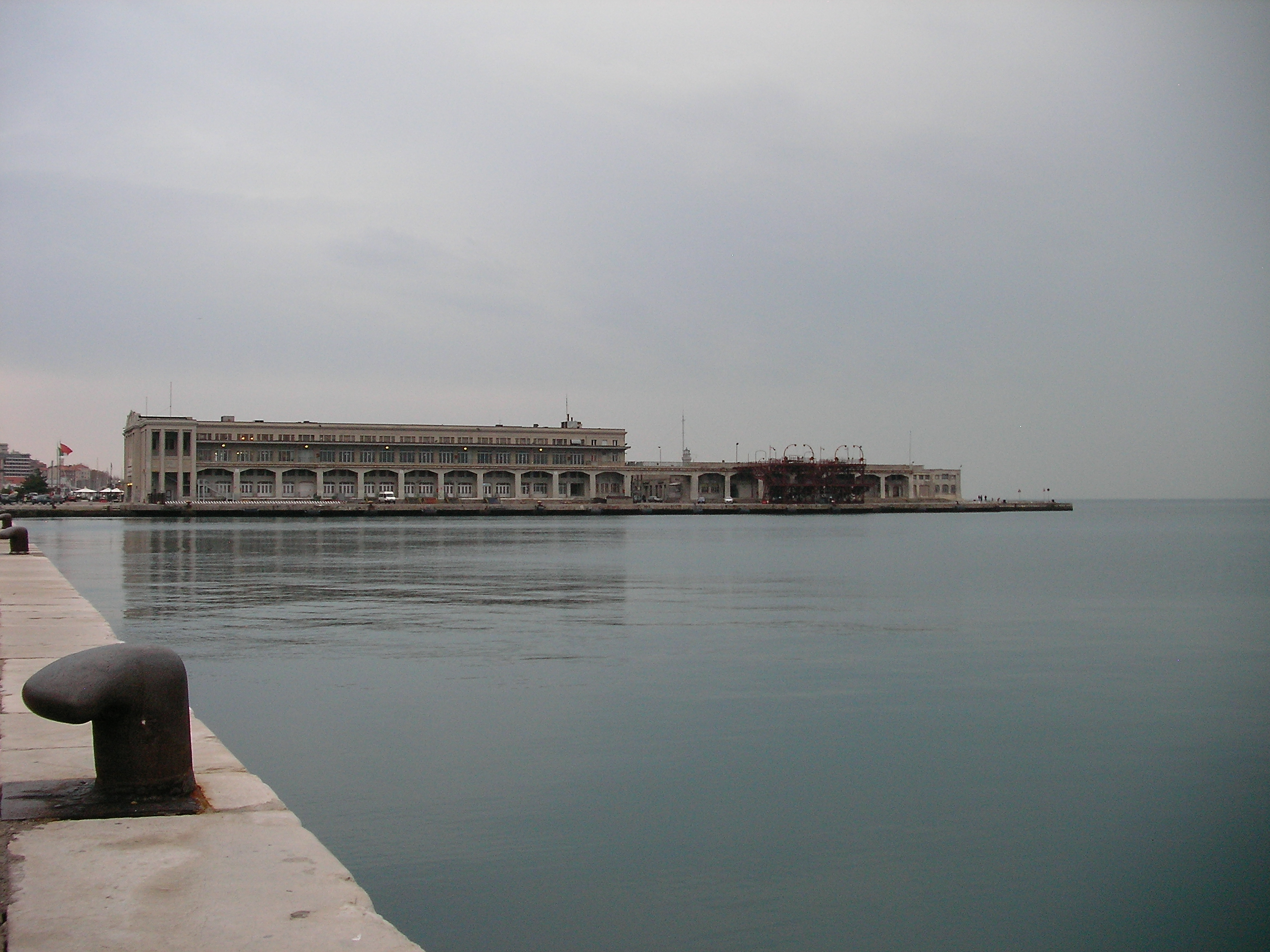

In numerous interviews, Mathieu Amalric has also stressed the importance of natural light in the city at the time of shooting. Apart from a few location scouts for certain scenes in which the sun's reflections play on the walls (in the cafés), the main thing was to "catch the world's photogenic light " as and when it presented itself, as we wandered the streets, beaches and places of Trieste. Light thus becomes one of the director's strategies for "filming the void " - that is, the absence of books, writers and history - thus making full use of the specificity of cinema vis-à-vis literature.

== See also ==
Novel: Le Stade de Wimbledon by Daniele Del Giudice

Short film: Malus by Mathieu Amalric

== Bibliography ==
- Del Giudice, Daniele (1983). Lo stadio di Wimbledon (in Italian). Einaudi. ISBN 978-8806141097.
- Del Giudice, Daniele (1985). Le Stade de Wimbledon. Translated by de Ceccatty, René. éditions Rivages. ISBN 978-2903059811.
