= Pietrangelo =

Pietrangelo is an Italian masculine given name and surname, a compound of Pietro and Angelo. Notable people with the name include:

- Alex Pietrangelo (born 1990), Canadian ice hockey defenceman
- Amelia Pietrangelo (born 1993), Canadian soccer striker
- Frank Pietrangelo (born 1964), Canadian ice hockey goaltender
- Pietrangelo Pettenò (born 1960), Italian politician

== See also ==
- Pierangeli
- Pierangelo
- Pietrangeli
