= Piero Gadda Conti =

Italian novelist and film critic

- Born: 13 February 1902; Milan, Italy
- Died: 22 January 1999 (aged 96); Milan, Italy
- Occupations: Novelist, film critic

Piero Gadda Conti (13 February 1902 – 22 January 1999) was an Italian novelist and film critic.

Born in Milan, the cousin of Carlo Emilio Gadda, he debuted as a novelist in 1924 with L' estusiastica estate. He got his breakout in 1930 with the novel Mozzo, and in 1970 he won the Bagutta Prize with the novel La paura. A film critic for the magazine La Fiera Letteraria and for the newspaper Il Popolo, Gadda Conti was a jury member of the Venice Film Festival five times, in 1950, 1951, 1955, 1958, and 1963.

== Biography ==
His father Giuseppe was an Engineer and entrepreneur active in the production of machinery and electrical systems and was a cousin of Carlo Emilio Gadda (who was the son of Francesco Ippolito Gadda, brother of Pietro Gadda, Giuseppe's father, in fact).

His mother Matilde Conti was sister of Ettore Conti, Count of Verampio, also an engineer and partner of his father Joseph. In 1939 this very uncle Ettore adopted Piero (along with Lia Baglia, daughter of another sister and former wife of prominent architect Piero Portaluppi); from then on Piero added his uncle's surname to his own.

Piero maintained a long epistolary correspondence with his novelist uncle, and shortly after his death collected these letters into a book, titling it The Confessions of Carlo Emilio Gadda.

He graduated in law from the University of Pavia and soon began to collaborate, especially as a Film criticism, with newspapers and magazines, including La Perseveranza, L'Ambrosiano, La Fiera Letteraria (his column “Cinelandia”), il Resto del Carlino, La Stampa, Pegaso, Nuova Antologia, Il Popolo, La Tribuna.

He served on the Jury of the Venice International Film Festival in 1950, 1951, 1955, 1958, 1963.

In 1970 he won the Bagutta Prize with La paura.

He was also a translator of works by Paul Gauguin, Aldous Huxley, Robert Louis Stevenson, Mark Twain, John Steinbeck, and Alphonse Daudet.

He died at the age of 96 in a clinic in Arzo, Switzerland.

He is buried in the necropolis of Cimitero Monumentale di Milano.
