= Raul Radice =

Italian novelist and journalist

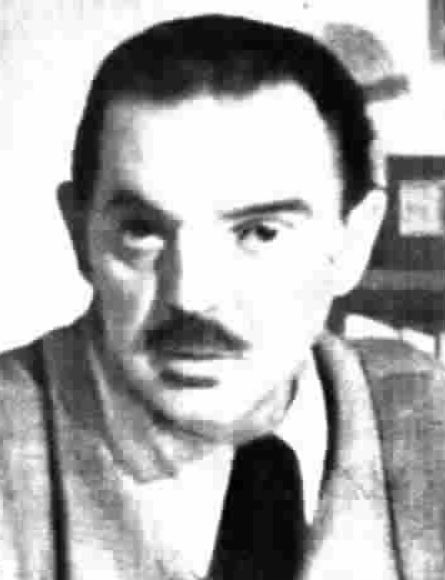
- Born: 19 March 1902; Milan, Italy
- Died: 1988; Rome, Italy

Raul Radice (19 March 1902 - 1988) was an Italian novelist and journalist.

Born in Milan, Radice was a theatrical and film critic for various publications, including Il Giornale d'Italia and Corriere della Sera. Also a novelist, in 1934 he won the Bagutta Prize for his novel Vita comica di Corinna.

After the death of founder Silvio D'Amico, Radice served as president of the Accademia d'Arte Drammatica in Rome.
