= Change Nothing =

- Directed by: Pedro Costa
- Written by: Pedro Costa
- Produced by: Abel Ribeiro Chaves
- Starring: Jeanne Balibar
- Cinematography: Pedro Costa
- Edited by: Patricia Saramago
- Release dates: May 15, 2009 (Cannes); January 27, 2010 (France)
- Running time: 100 minutes
- Country: Portugal
- Language: French

Change Nothing (French: Ne change rien) is a 2009 documentary directed by Portuguese filmmaker Pedro Costa. The documentary focuses on the French singer Jeanne Balibar in rehearsal and concert as seen through Costa's characteristically long, stark takes.
