= Silvio Negro =

Italian essayist and journalist (1897–1959)

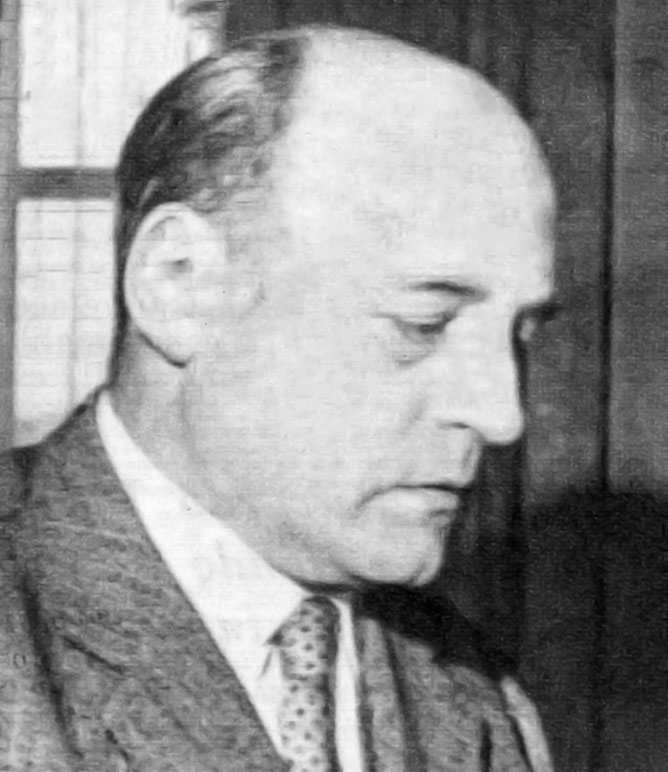
- Silvio Negro in Radiocorriere magazine, 1958.
- Born: 15 April 1897; Chiampo, Italy
- Died: 3 November 1959 (aged 62); Rome, Italy

Silvio Negro (15 April 1897 – 3 November 1959) was an Italian essayist and journalist.

Born in Chiampo, the son of a humble farmer, Negro was a mountain artillery officer during World War I and also received several decorations. After the war, he started composing poems under the pseudonym "Orsobruno" and graduated in letters at the University of Padua in 1922.

Thanks to a post-graduation scholarship, Negro moved to Rome, where he started collaborating with the Vatican newspaper L'Osservatore Romano. In 1923, he moved to Milan, where he first collaborated with the catholic publication L'Italia, and in 1926 he was enrolled on the newspaper Corriere della Sera, of which he was the Vaticanist from 1931 until his death.

In 1937, Negro won the Bagutta Prize for the book Vaticano Minore. He was also a collector of vintage pictures, of which he organized several exhibitions; the pictures are now held by the foundation Fondo Negro.
