= Pierangeli =

Pierangeli is an Italian surname derived from the given name Pierangelo. Notable people with the surname include:

- Anna Maria Pierangeli (1932–1971), known as Pier Angeli, Italian actress, model and singer
- Maria Luisa Pierangeli (1932–2023), known as Marisa Pavan, Italian and French actress
- Mario Bernardo Pierangeli (1914–1988), Italian tax lawyer, forger and pretender
- Ulderico Pierangeli (1866–?), the abusive husband of Italian author Sibilla Aleramo

== See also ==
- Pierangelo
- Pietrangeli
- Pietrangelo
