= Take-off (book) =

1994 essay collection by Daniele Del Giudice

- Author: Daniele Del Giudice
- Original title: Staccando l'ombra da terra
- Translator: Joseph Farrell
- Language: Italian
- Subject: aviation
- Genre: essays; memoir
- Publisher: Giulio Einaudi Editore
- Publication date: 1994
- Publication place: Italy
- English publication date: 1 May 1997
- Pages: 122
- ISBN: 9788806135843

Take-off (Italian: Staccando l'ombra da terra, lit. 'Detaching the Shadow from the Ground'), published in the United States as Takeoff: The Pilot's Lore, is a 1994 essay collection by the Italian writer and aviator Daniele Del Giudice. It consists of Del Giudice's personal reflections and memories about flight, as well as other aviation anecdotes related to World War II and the years after it. The book was written on the request of Federico Fellini after Del Giudice told him some aviation stories.

Several critics likened the book to the works of Antoine de Saint-Exupéry; The Spectator called it "a direct descendent of the Saint-Exupéry school of aeronautical/philosophical writing". In Italy, it was awarded the Bagutta Prize and Flaiano Prize and was one of five finalists for the Campiello Prize. The English translation by Joseph Farrell received the John Florio Prize.
