= Giulio Confalonieri =

Italian musician and musicologist (1896–1972)

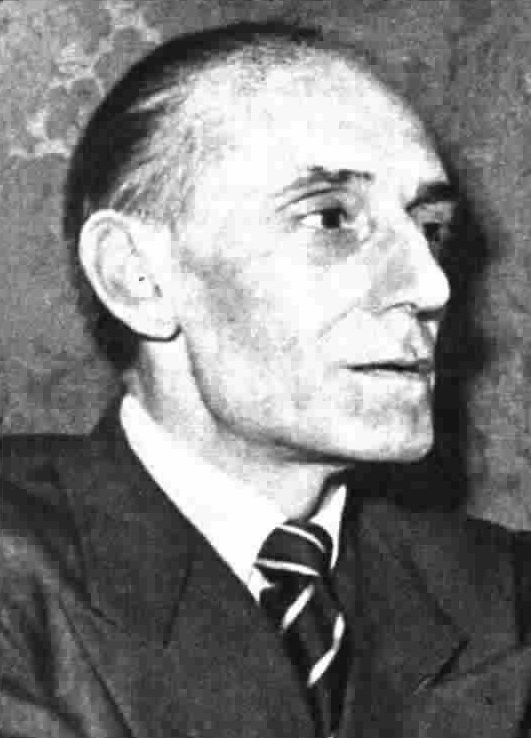
- Confalonieri in Radiocorriere magazine, 1954.
- Born: 23 May 1896; Milan, Italy
- Died: 29 June 1972 (aged 76); Milan, Italy

Giulio Confalonieri (23 May 1896 - 29 June 1972) was an Italian musician, musicologist, composer and musical critic.

Born in Milan, Confalonieri graduated in letters at the Accademia scientifico-letteraria di Milano and in piano at the Bologna Conservatory. Between 1919 and 1920 he composed his first opera, "Rosaspina", which was eventually staged only in 1939. In 1921 he moved to Paris, where he became friends with Paul Dukas, and then to London, where he stayed until 1927 teaching piano, performing as a concert pianist, and composing incidental music.

Returned to Italy, after a long period of isolation and study, in the late 1930s Confalonieri resumed his activity as a composer, and in 1940, he started collaborating with the magazine Settegiorni as a musical critic. In 1944 he lost the use of a leg because of an accident, and then focused on writing, collaborating with a large number of publications, notably Il Giorno, Oggi and Epoca.

Confalonieri wrote several books including a History of Music and a children's novel, Il Cavalier Cuccagna. He won the Bagutta Prize in 1949 with Prigionia di un artista, a monography about Luigi Cherubini. He also directed the singing school of La Scala, founded and directed the "Ettore Pozzoli" International Piano Competition in Seregno, collaborated for years with the radio program Il Contemporaneo and in 1957-8 was a lecturer of Italian opera at the Cincinnati Conservatory.

Confalonieri died on 29 June 1972, aged 76, following a heart attack.
