= Enrico Emanuelli =

Italian novelist, essayist and journalist

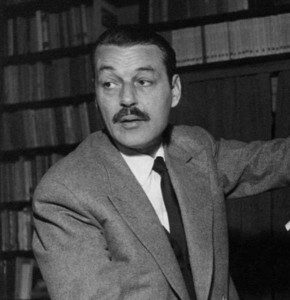
- Born: 17 April 1909; Novara, Italy
- Died: 1 July 1967 (aged 58); Milan, Italy

Enrico Emanuelli (17 April 1909 - 1 July 1967) was an Italian novelist, essayist and journalist.

Born in Novara into a wealthy family, Emanuelli studied as an autodidact after primary school. In 1928 he co-founded, with Mario Soldati and Mario Bonfantini, the literary prestigious magazine La Libra (1928-1930). The same year he made his novel debut with Memolo, ovvero vita, morte e miracoli di un uomo, which got him critical comparisons to Ugo Foscolo and Giacomo Leopardi.

In 1929 Emanuelli started his journalistic career, collaborating with the Genoa newspaper Il Lavoro. He later directed the magazine Costume and worked, often for reports from abroad, for La Stampa and Corriere della Sera. His travels inspired him to several books in the form of travel diaries such as Giornale Indiano and La Cina è vicina. His 1959 novel The man from New York (Italian: Uno di New York) got him a Bagutta Prize as well as critical praises which paired him to Gustave Flaubert and Alain Robbe-Grillet.

Emanuelli died of a heart attack on 1 July 1967. His last novel, Curriculum mortis, was released posthumously and incomplete in 1968, yet it was received as his masterpiece.
