= Daniele Del Giudice =

Italian author and lecturer (1949–2021)

Daniele Del Giudice (11 January 1949 – 2 September 2021) was an Italian author and lecturer. He lived in Venice, where he taught theatrical literature at the University Iuav of Venice.

== Biography ==
Born in Rome in 1949, Del Giudice researched avant-garde theatre first in Wrocław, Poland, and later political theatre, focusing on the Italian playwright and actor Dario Fo. He also worked for various newspapers, becoming an established essayist and literary critic. His first novel in 1983, Lo stadio di Wimbledon (Wimbledon Stadium) told the story of writer Roberto Bazlen, who gives up writing to lead an active life. The novel was made into a film in 2002. Del Giudice's 1994 book Take-off, which consists of his reflections, memories and anecdotes about aviation, was awarded the Bagutta Prize and Flaiano Prize. Del Giudice died on 2 September 2021 at the age of 72.

== Prizes ==
- Viareggio Prize (1983) (Opera Prima Narrativa)
- Bergamo Prize (1986)
- Bagutta Prize (1995)
- Flaiano Prize (1995)
- Selezione Premio Campiello (1995, 1997)
- Feltrinelli Prize (2002)
- European Union Prize for Literature (2009)

== List of works ==
- Lo stadio di Wimbledon (1983) Translated by Anne Milano Appel as A Fictional Inquiry, published in 2025 by New Vessel Press.
- Atlante occidentale (1985) Translated by Norman MacAfee and Luigi Fontanella as Lines of Light (1988)
- Nel museo di Reims (1988)
- Taccuino Australe (1990) A 6-part diary of a journey to Antarctica, published in Corriere della Sera and Frankfurter Allgemeine Zeitung
- Staccando l'ombra da terra (1994) Translated by Joseph Farrell as Take-off (UK) Takeoff: The Pilot's Lore (US) (1996)
- Mania (1997)
- Orizzonte mobile (2009)
