= Beijing Design Week =

Annual design event in Beijing, China

Beijing Design Week (BJDW) is an annual design event that takes place in Beijing, China during the fall. In 2012, Beijing joined UNESCO's Creative Cities Network as a City of Design. The purpose of Beijing Design Week is to raise public awareness of design as well as to help develop stronger design infrastructures and discourses in Beijing.

BJDW is an initiative of the Ministry of Education of the PRC, the Ministry of Science and Technology of the PRC, the Ministry of Culture of the PRC, and the People's Government of Beijing Municipality's. It is undertaken by Beijing's Gehua Cultural Development Group and Beijing Industrial Design Center.

== Opening and award ceremonies ==
The opening ceremony and the Beijing Design Awards mark the beginning of Beijing Design Week. The Design Awards honor organizations, individuals, or pieces that excel in encouraging social progress, cultural development, trade promotion, and construction. These awards also present China's achievements in the design field, promote design innovation, stimulate the design industry, and ultimately set the trend for Beijing's design market. These awards are widely respected inside and outside the design industry as one of the most significant international design awards.

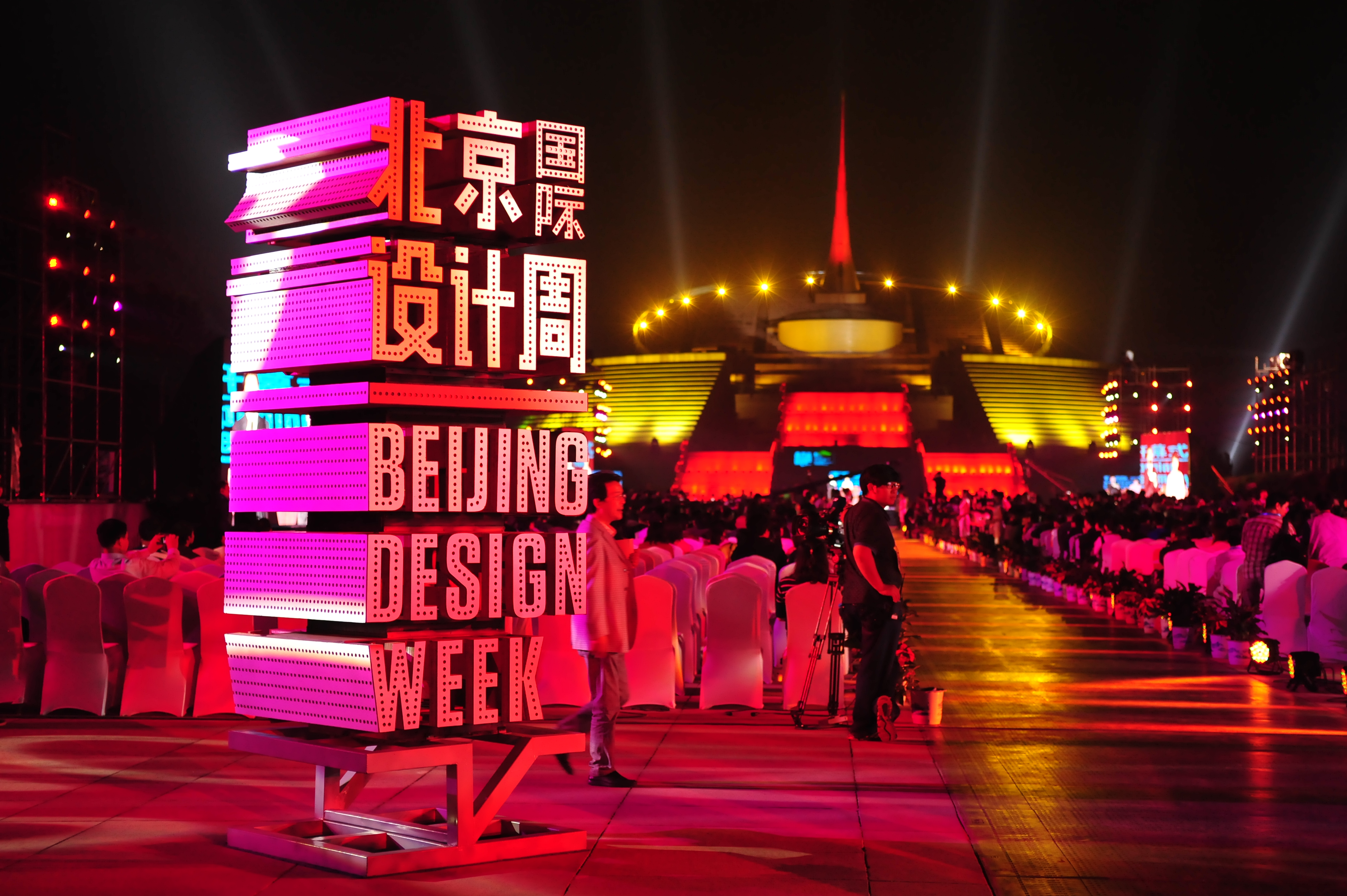
Opening Ceremony of the Beijing Design Week at the China Millennium Monument in 2011.

== Forum ==
The Beijing Design Week Forum is one of the main sections of BJDW. Policymakers and industry leaders aim to share their experience in design during the day-long event. The BJDW Forum articulates itself around different themes depending on the year. Past speakers have included Daan Roosegaarde, Masayuki Kurokawa, Marcel Wanders, and Min Wang.

== Guest city ==
Every year, BJDW hosts a guest city representative to share their wisdom and experience. The aim is to promote institutional exchange as well as commercial and economic opportunities amongst the two cities. Past participants have been London, Milan, Amsterdam, and in 2014, Barcelona.

== Design Fair ==
The Beijing design market is the platform for trading design and copyrights, products, talents, and services. The development of the Beijing Design Market focuses on two aspects: design trading and market consumption.

== Design Hop ==
The Design Hop is the exhibition component of the BJDW. Located in different areas in Beijing, it showcases projects from designers and companies from around the world. Design Hop is considered to be one of the most dynamic sections of BJDW, involving events, exhibitions, installations, seminars, and lectures.

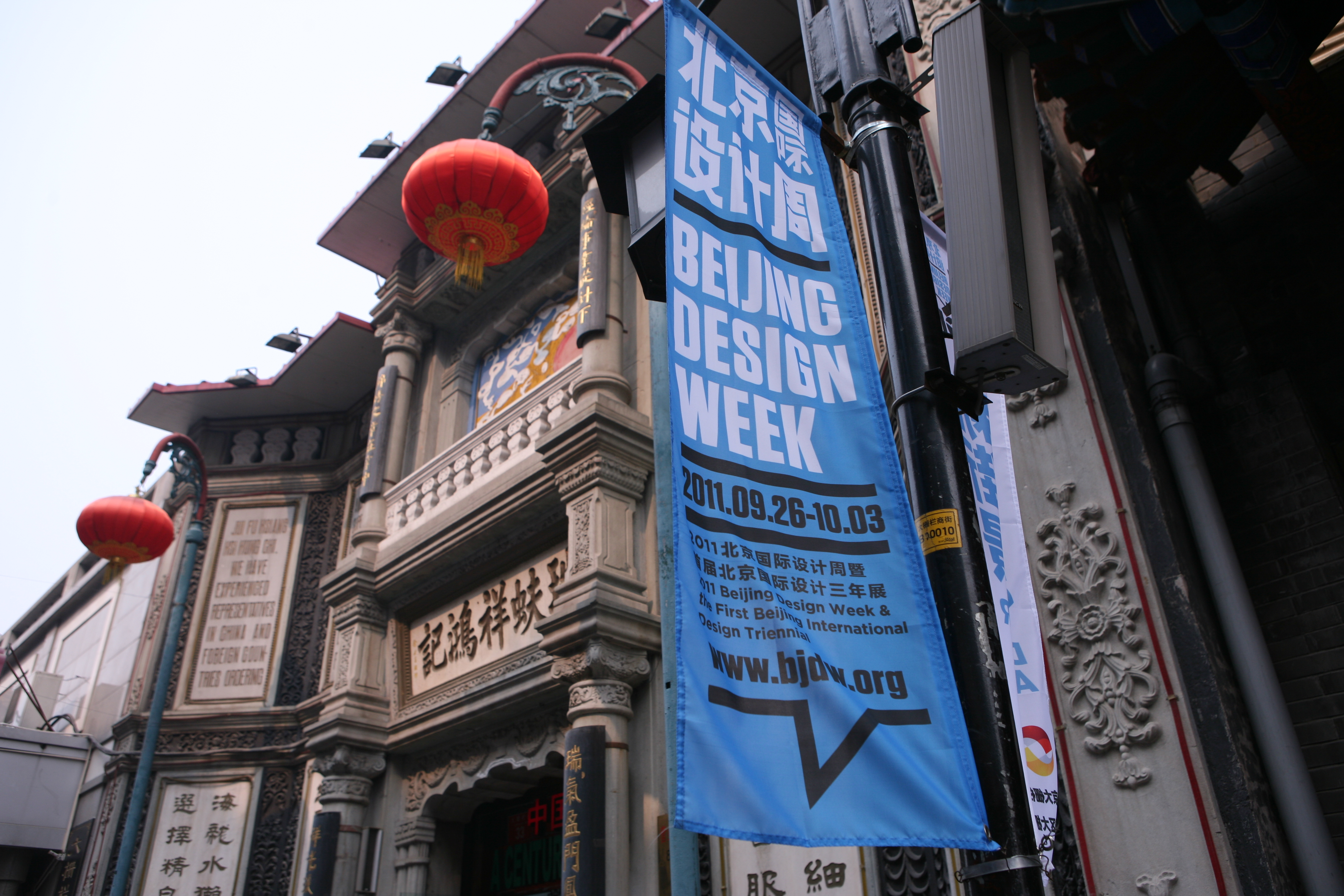
One of the Design Hop banners during the 2011 Beijing Design Week in the Dashilar area

== Design Copyright Service ==
Initiated by Beijing Design Week and International Copyright Exchange Center, Design Copyright Service is a website for design copyright registration. With this initiative, the new rule of the design market will be "first the copyright, then the design". The features of this service are electronic notarization for design copyright conducted via the internet, as well as patent registration and copyright registration, special technology for protection that cannot be reversed, exclusive digital password, a database of national standard to ensure secrecy and safety of the documents.
