= Gianfranco Calligarich =

Italian writer (1939–2024)

- Born: 3 May 1939; Asmara, Italian East Africa (now Eritrea)
- Died: 25 November 2024 (aged 85)
- Occupation: Writer

Gianfranco Calligarich (3 May 1939 – 25 November 2024) was an Italian novelist, screenwriter and dramatist.

== Life and career ==
Born in Asmara to a family of Trieste origins, after the World War II Calligarich moved with his family to Milan, where he started working as a journalist. In 1961, he was sent by the magazine he worked for to Rome to run the local department, and from then on he settled in the capital. After writing a few short stories, in 1973 he released his debut novel Last Summer in the City (L'ultima estate in città), which after having been rejected from all the major editors was published by Garzanti upon suggestion of Natalia Ginzburg. In the following years, Calligarich focused on television and film screenwriting, and in 1994 he founded the stage company Teatro XX Secolo.

Calligarich made his literary return in 2002, with the collection of short stories Posta prioritaria ("Priority Mail"). In 2011, he won the Bagutta Prize with Privati abissi ("Private abysses"), and in 2017 he won the Viareggio Prize with La malinconia dei Crusich ("Melancholy of the Crusichs").

Calligarich died on 25 November 2024, at the age of 85.

== English translations ==
- Last Summer in the City (L'ultima estate in città) translated by Howard Curtis, Farrar Straus & Giroux (USA) & Picador (UK), 2021
