= Roberto Meneguzzo =

Roberto Meneguzzo (born February 6, 1956) is an Italian business financier and investor, notable for founding and heading a leading Italian merchant banking firm, Palladio Finanziaria S.p.A.

== Biography ==
Born in Malo (Province of Vicenza), Meneguzzo graduated from Ca' Foscari University of Venice in 1979. He is an Italian Chartered Accountant since 1981 and has followed specialization courses at various American universities including U.C. Berkeley, Boston University and University of Massachusetts Amherst.

In 1980, Meneguzzo founded Palladio Leasing S.p.A., a leasing firm operating in the North-East of Italy which was later sold, after a period of exceptional growth and economic results, to Mediobanca (a leading Italian investment bank) which acquired a majority share in 1989 and the residual share ownership at various steps in the 1990s.

During this time, in 1982, Meneguzzo also founded Palladio Finanziaria S.p.A., which has become one of the most important merchant banks operating in the North-East regions of Italy catering to Italian medium-size companies. As CEO he currently manages over €700 million which is invested through controlled or affiliated investment companies and private equity funds and advises top medium-size companies on corporate finance issues and M&A transactions. Palladio Finanziaria is controlled by Roberto Meneguzzo and the management team and is participated by Veneto Banca, Banco Popolare and leading industrialists of the Veneto region. The firm is based in Vicenza, Milan and Luxembourg.

Roberto Meneguzzo sits on the Board of several prominent Italian financial companies including Palladio Finanziaria S.p.A., Venice S.p.A., Alcedo SGR S.p.A., and Ferak S.p.A.

== See also ==
- Merchant banking
- History of private equity and venture capital
- Private equity
- Leveraged buyout
