= Carola Susani =

Italian writer (born 1965)

Carola Susani (born 1965) is an Italian writer. She was born in Marostica (Vicenza). She published her first novel Il libro di Teresa (Teresa’s Book) in 1995. Her most recent book Eravamo bambini abbastanza (We Were Young Enough, 2012) won the Lo Straniero Prize and the Prata Prize for Fiction. She has also written children's books.

Her work has been translated into German, Polish and English. She is on the editorial staff of Nuovi Argomenti, a major literary journal in Italy.

== Works ==
- Il libro di Teresa (Teresa’s Book), 1995
- La terra dei dinosauri (The Land of the Dinosaurs), 1998
- Il viaggiatore (The Traveller; short story) in anthology Italville: New Italian Writing (Exile Editions, Toronto), 2005
- Maisons sans plus de porte (reportage) in Last and Lost (Noir sur Blanc, Paris), 2007
- Pecore vive (Live Sheep; short stories), 2007 - longlisted for the Strega Prize
- Eravamo bambini abbastanza (We Were Young Enough), 2012 - winner of the Lo Straniero Prize and the Prata Prize for Fiction
