= Jeanne Balibar =

French actress and singer (born 1968)

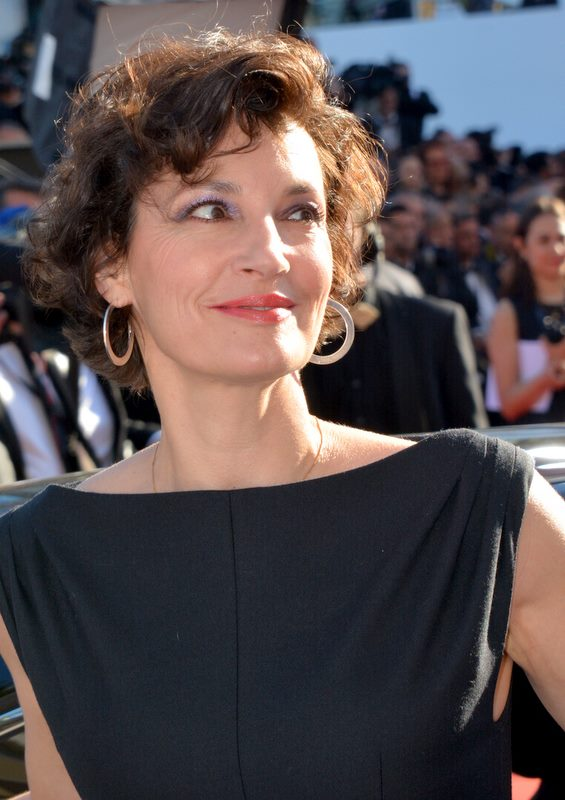
- Balibar in 2017
- Born: 13 April 1968 (age 58); Paris, France
- Occupations: Actress, singer
- Years active: 1992–present
- Children: 2
- Parents: Étienne Balibar; Françoise Balibar

Jeanne Balibar (born 13 April 1968) is a French actress and singer.

== Life and career ==
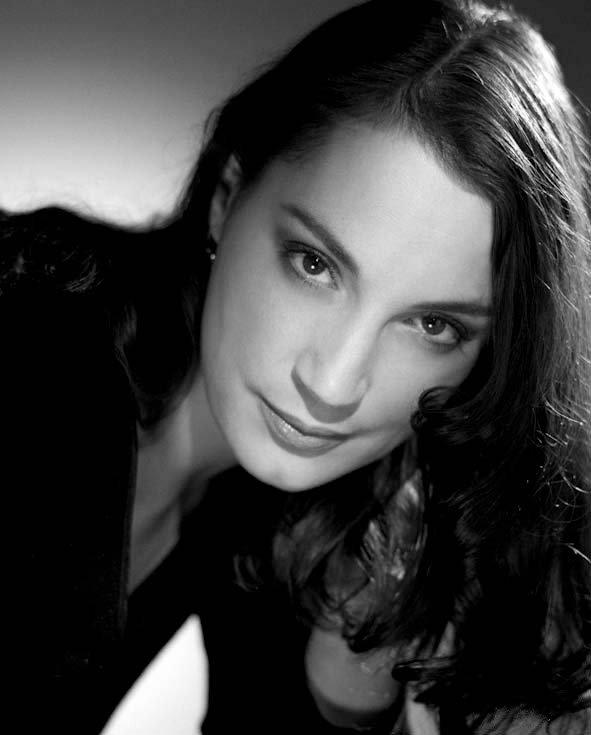
Balibar in 1998

Balibar was born in Paris, the daughter of Marxist philosopher Étienne Balibar and physicist Françoise Balibar. She started her career as a student in the famous French theater school "Cours Florent", in Paris, with her friends, actor Eric Ruf and photographer & actor Gregory Herpe. She began her acting career on the stage, in "Don Juan" at the Festival d'Avignon. Her first film role was in Arnaud Desplechin's 1992 film The Sentinel. She continues to perform in both spheres. She has supported François Hollande's 2012 presidential campaign.

She starred in Ne change rien (2009) directed by Pedro Costa. Among other films, she appeared in 17 Times Cécile Cassard (2002), directed by Christophe Honoré, with Béatrice Dalle and Romain Duris; All the Fine Promises (2003), directed by Jean-Paul Civeyrac, with Bulle Ogier and Valérie Crunchant; and Clean (2004), directed by Olivier Assayas, with Maggie Cheung and Nick Nolte.

== Filmography ==
Year	Title	Original title	Character
1992	The Sentinel	La sentinelle	partygoer (uncredited)
1996	My Sex Life... or How I Got into an Argument	Comment je me suis disputé... (ma vie sexuelle)	Valérie
1998	Late August, Early September	Fin août, début septembre	Jenny
2000	Comedy of Innocence	Comédie de l'innocence	Isabella
2000	Tomorrow's Another Day	Ça ira mieux demain	Elisabeth
2001	Le Stade de Wimbledon	—N/a	the young woman
2001	Who knows?	Va savoir	Camille
2002	A Private Affair	Une affaire privée	Sylvie
2002	Seventeen Times Cecile Cassard	17 fois Cécile Cassard	Edith
2003	Code 46	—N/a	Sylvie
2004	Clean	—N/a	Irene Paolini
2007	The Duchess of Langeais	Ne touchez pas la hache	Antoinette
2008	Sagan	—N/a	Peggy Roche
2009	All About Actresses	Le Bal des actrices	Herself
2009	A Town Called Panic	Panique au village	Jacqueline Longrée
2014	Grace of Monaco	—N/a	Countess of Baciocchi
2014	Portrait of the Artist	Le Dos rouge	Célia Bhy
2016	Never Ever	À jamais	Isabelle
2017	Barbara	—N/a	Brigitte
2018	Cold War	Zimna wojna	Juliette
2019	Les Misérables	—N/a	The Commissioner
2021	Lost Illusions	Illusions perdues	Marquise d'Espard
2021	Memoria	məmorᴉa	Agnes Cerkinsky
2021	The Rope (Miniseries)	La Corde	Sophie Rauk
2022	Irma Vep (Miniseries)	—N/a	Zoe
2023	Les Indésirables	—N/a	
2024	Franklin (Miniseries)	—N/a	Anne-Catherine de Ligniville, Madame Helvétius
2025	Nino	—N/a	Nino's mother
2025	Once Upon My Mother	Ma mère, Dieu et Sylvie Vartan	Mme Fleury
2026	Quelqu'un devrait interdire les dimanches après-midi (Miniseries)	—N/a	Alix

== Discography ==
- Paramour (2003)
- Slalom Dame (2006)
- D'ici là tout l'été (2023)

== Decorations ==
- Officer of the Order of Arts and Letters (2016)
- 2017: Lumière Award for Best Actress
- 2017: César Award for Best Actress
