= Bruno Arpaia =

Italian writer and journalist

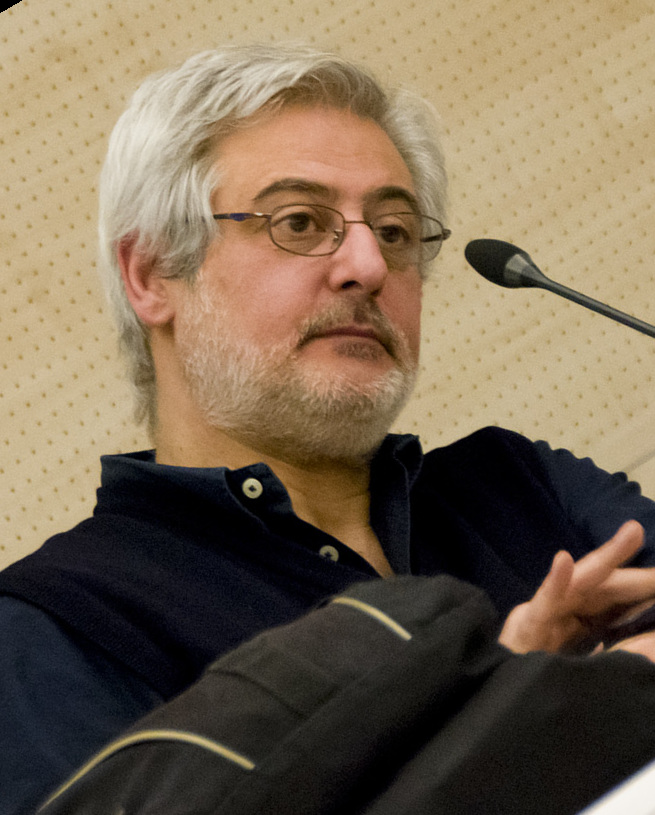
- Bruno Arpaia
- Born: 1957 (age 68–69); Naples, Italy
- Education: University of Naples
- Occupations: Writer, Journalist

Bruno Arpaia, born in Naples (Italy) in 1957, is an Italian writer and journalist.

== Life ==
After his degree in political sciences and a specialisation in American history at the University of Naples, he taught there and then became a journalist with the Italian newspaper Il Mattino of Naples, subsequently moving to Milan in 1989, where he worked for the daily La Repubblica.

In 1990, he published his first novel, I forestieri (The Foreigners), which won the Bagutta Prize the following year. Arpaia published another three novels after leaving the newspaper La Repubblica in 1998, in order to dedicate himself solely to writing and freelance journalism.

L'Angelo della storia (Guanda, 2001) is his most successful novel, also being selected for the prestigious Campiello Prize in 2001. Translated into English in 2006 with the title The Angel of History by Minna Proctor, under the patronage of the Scottish Arts Council and the Italian Cultural Institute, it tells the partly fictional story of philosopher Walter Benjamin and a young Spanish militant in 1940. Arpaia's twofold narrative retraces Benjamin's flight across Europe and the Spaniard's youthful activism, as both men battle to assert their beliefs in the face of ultimate extinction.

Arpaia lives in Milan and currently alternates between translation, journalism and writing novels. He is also a publishing consultant for several Italian newspapers and publishing houses.

== Bibliography ==
- (in Italian) I forestieri, Leonardo Editore, 1990.
- (in Italian) Il futuro in punta di piedi, Donzelli, 1994.
- (in Italian) Tempo perso, Marco Tropea editore, 1997; Guanda, 2003.
- (in Italian) L'Angelo della storia, Guanda, 2001.
- (in English) The Angel of History, Canongate, 2006
- (in Italian) Il passato davanti a noi, Guanda, 2006.
- (in Italian) Per una sinistra reazionaria, Guanda, 2007.
- (in Italian) L'energia del vuoto, Guanda, 2011.
- (in Italian) Qualcosa, là fuori, Guanda, 2016.
