= Pierangelo Summa =

Italian thestre director, artist, puppeteer (1947–2015)

Pierangelo Summa (19 August 1947 – 15 July 2015) also known as Piero Summa, was an Italian theatre director, theatre masks creator, and puppeteer.

== Biography ==
Born in Como, Italy, he is mostly known in Europe. Even if he can be considered as one of the leaders of the Italian theater movement of the 1970s, for his puppets, commedia dell'arte masks and theatre directing, he mainly became known in France from the 1980s on, and even more after his death in 2015, when his work was rediscovered and brought to light by his son, Robin Summa.

Summa first started his activity by participating in a few puppet troupes, one of which, La Gabbia dei Giupitt, animated the television show Il Giudice di Roccastorta on Swiss television Radiotelevisione svizzera (RSI) in 1977.

In the 1990s, his work progressively became more and more concentrated on theatre directing, in France, Italy, but also Germany, Lebanon or Georgia.

Since 2019, his son, Robin Summa, took over his commedia dell'arte masks creation in Naples, Italy, where he opened a shop dedicated to theatre masks' crafting, La maschera è libertà.

He also edited some writings and lessons of his father in Italy. The book has the same title as the shop.

Summa died in Paris, France.
