= Eugenio Borgna =

Italian psychiatrist and essayist (1930–2024)

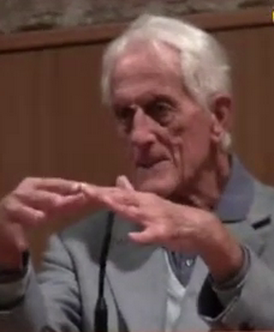
- Borgna in 2012
- Born: 22 July 1930; Borgomanero, Italy
- Died: 4 December 2024 (aged 94); Borgomanero, Italy
- Occupations: Psychiatrist; Writer

Eugenio Borgna (22 July 1930 – 4 December 2024) was an Italian psychiatrist and essayist.

== Life and career ==
Born in Borgomanero, the son of a lawyer and anti-fascist resistance partisan, in 1954 Borgna graduated in medicine and surgery from the University of Turin, and in 1957 specialised in nervous and mental diseases at the University of Milan, where he was already serving as a lecturer. In 1963, he became director of the women's ward of the Novara psychiatric hospital, where he banned the use of medical restraint and coercive therapies and launched a different therapeutic approach based on dialogue with the patients.

A proponent of phenomenological psychiatry and a supporter of Franco Basaglia's principles, Borgna was author of numerous studies and essays, particularly focusing on schizophrenia and depression. In 2005, he was awarded the Bagutta Prize for the essay L'attesa e la speranza ('The wait and the hope'). His last work was an essay about female suicide, L'ora che non ha più sorelle ('The hour that has no more sisters'), published by Einaudi in November 2024.

Borgna died on 4 December 2024, at the age of 94.
