= Pier Angelo Soldini =

Italian writer and journalist (1910–1974)

- Born: 25 May 1910; Castelnuovo Scrivia, Italy
- Died: 12 July 1974 (aged 64); Volpedo, Italy

Pier Angelo Soldini (25 May 1910 – 12 July 1974) was an Italian novelist, essayist and journalist.

Born in Castelnuovo Scrivia, in 1935 Soldini won a special Viareggio Prize for best first work thanks to his debut novel Alghe e meduse. In 1937, he won the Bagutta Prize for the book Sole e bandiere.

Soldini collaborated as a journalist with various publications and was the editorial director of the publishing house Palazzi. He died on 12 July 1974 in Volpedo, where he was spending his holidays.
