= Borga =

Borga may refer to:

- Borga, in Swedish Porvoo
- Borga Base, semipermanent Antarctic research station operated by South Africa

== People ==
- Antonin Borga (born 1987), Swiss racing driver
- Jessica Borga (born 1989), American bare-knuckle boxer and mixed martial artist
- José Luís Borga (born 1964), Portuguese Catholic priest and Christian contemporary musician
- Mally Burjam-Borga (1874 – 1919), Finnish opera singer
- Rebecca Borga (born 1998), Italian sprinter
