= Rina Macrelli =

Italian screenwriter (1929–2020)

- Born: 2 September 1929; Santarcangelo di Romagna, Kingdom of Italy
- Died: 7 November 2020 (aged 91); Cattolica, Italy
- Occupation: Screenwriter

Rina Macrelli (2 September 1929 – 7 November 2020) was an Italian screenwriter and essayist. She also worked as an assistant director for Liliana Cavani and Michelangelo Antonioni and a director of dubbing.

== Biography ==
Born in Santarcangelo di Romagna, Macrelli studied at Ca' Foscari University of Venice. She went to Paris in 1952 on a scholarship to carry out research for her thesis at the Faculty of Letters at the University of Paris. She returned to Italy at the beginning of 1954 and graduated later that same year after defending her thesis on the short stories and novels of Voltaire.

Macrelli's career in culture and cinema began at the end of the 1950s. She moved to Rome to serve as assistant director for several French and Italian filmmakers. Notably, she collaborated with Michelangelo Antonioni for the film Zabriskie Point in 1970. Her activities subsequently spread to the television industry. She wrote a series of screenplays and scripts, notably collaborating with Liliana Cavani.

Macrelli was also an essayist, serving as one of the main animators for E' circal de' giudéizi, promoting the cultural and linguistic heritage of Romagna. A feminist, she was heavily and socially involved with the promotion of women's rights.

Rina Macrelli died in Cattolica on 7 November 2020 at the age of 91.

== Screenwriting ==
- Bernadette Devlin (1971)
- Astronave Terra (1971)
- Il numero 10 (1972)
- Aut aut. Cronaca di una rapina (1976)
- Il passatore (1977)

== Essays ==
- Il coro della guerra. Venti storie parlate (1963)
- Ridiamo su Proudhon. Alle origini della teoria neo-patriarcale (1979)
- L'indegna schiavitù. Anna Maria Mozzoni e la lotta contro la prostituzione di Stato (1980)

== Awards ==
- Arcangelo d'Oro of the commune of Santarcangelo di Romagna with Gianni Fucci (2012)
