= Ca' Foscari University of Venice =

Public university in Venice, Italy

- Latin: Venetiarum universitas in domo Foscari
- Former names: Regia Scuola Superiore di Commercio, Istituto Superiore di Economia e Commercio di Venezia
- Type: Public
- Established: 6 August 1868
- Rector: Tiziana Lippiello
- Students: 21,000
- Location: Venice, Veneto, Italy; 45.4345°N 12.3265°E
- Campus: Urban
- Website: unive.it

Ca' Foscari University of Venice (Italian: Università Ca' Foscari Venezia), or simply Ca' Foscari, is a public research university and business school in Venice, Italy. Since its foundation in 1868, it has been housed in the Venetian Gothic palace of Ca' Foscari, from which it takes its name. The palace stands on the Grand Canal, between the Rialto and San Marco, in the sestiere of Dorsoduro, while the rest of the University is scattered around the historical centre. In addition to the historical centre of Venice, Ca' Foscari also has campuses in Mestre and Treviso.

Ca' Foscari was founded in 1868 after the annexation of the Veneto region in the Kingdom of Italy as the Regia Scuola Superiore di Commercio (Royal College of Commerce). As such, it is the second oldest business school in the world, after the Institut Supérieur de Commerce d'Anvers, founded in 1853. Ca' Foscari expanded throughout the 1900s and became a full-fledged university in 1968. It currently has eight departments and almost 21,000 students, and is Venice's biggest university.

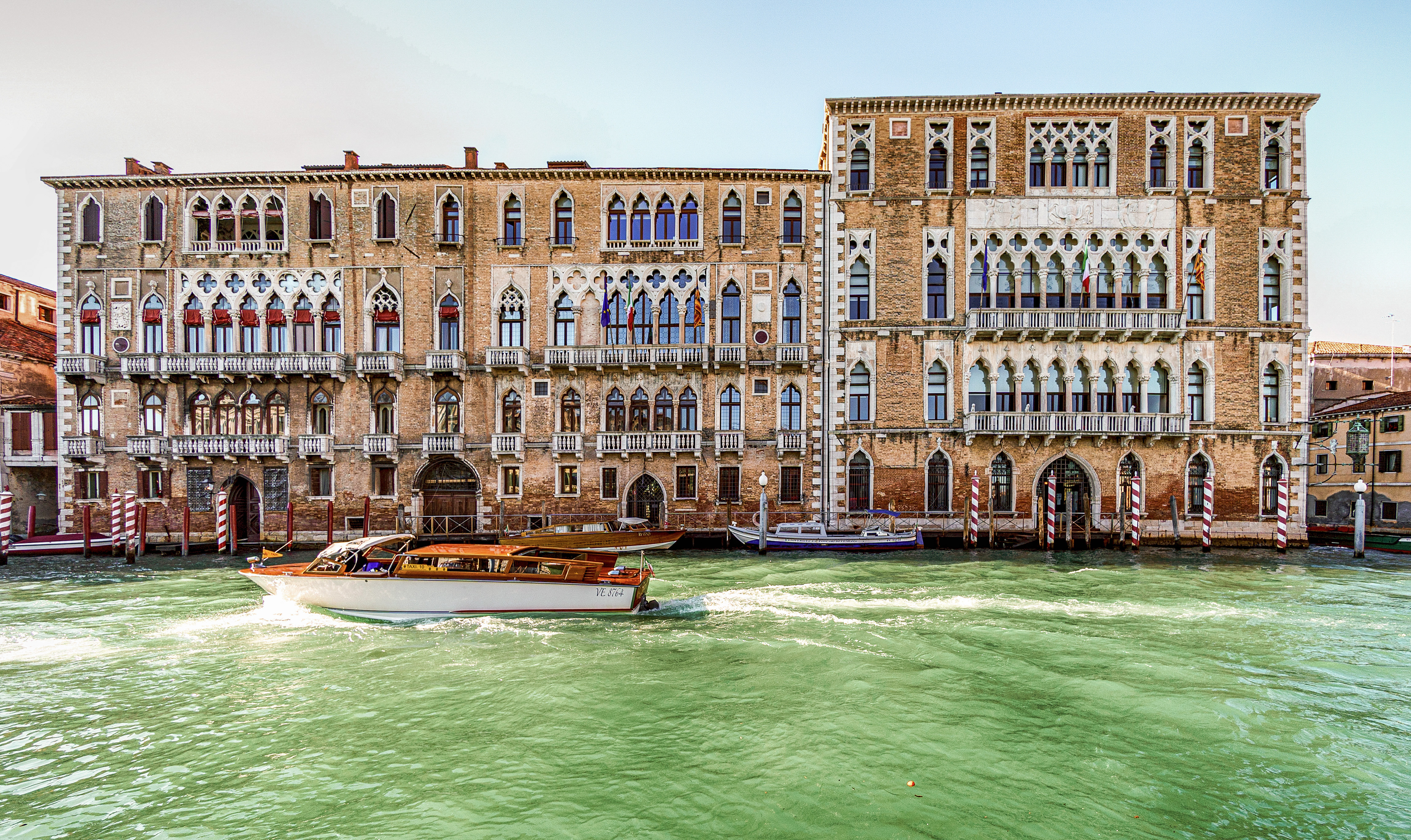
The Ca' Foscari Palace seen from the Grand Canal.

Its teaching and research is centred around economics & business, humanities, and modern languages.

== History ==
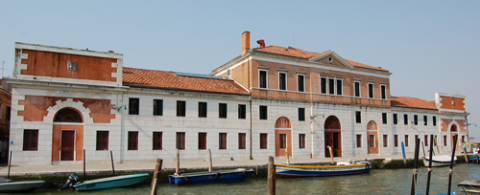
San Giobbe Campus, Ca' Foscari's Department of Economics.

Ca' Foscari was founded as the "Regia Scuola Superiore di Commercio" (Royal College of Commerce) by a Royal Decree dated 6 August 1868, and teaching commenced in December of the same year. The idea of establishing such a school had arisen after the annexation of the Veneto to the new Kingdom of Italy in 1866, and was promoted by three people in particular: the political economist Luigi Luzzatti, later Prime Minister of Italy; Edoardo Deodati, senator of the Kingdom of Italy and vice-president of the province of Venice; and the Sicilian political economist Francesco Ferrara, director of the school for its first thirty years.

The school was the first institute of higher education in commerce in Italy. It also had a diplomatic section to train and educate Diplomats and commercial consular staff for overseas service and international law. In addition, Ca' Foscari was also created to operate as a training college for secondary school teachers of commercial subjects. Foreign languages were taught from the start as well as the study of foreign cultures. The school was parallelled only by the Institut Supérieur de Commerce d'Anvers, founded in 1853 in Antwerp, Belgium. Today, Ca' Foscari is still a specialised university for the study of business economics, humanitites and languages.

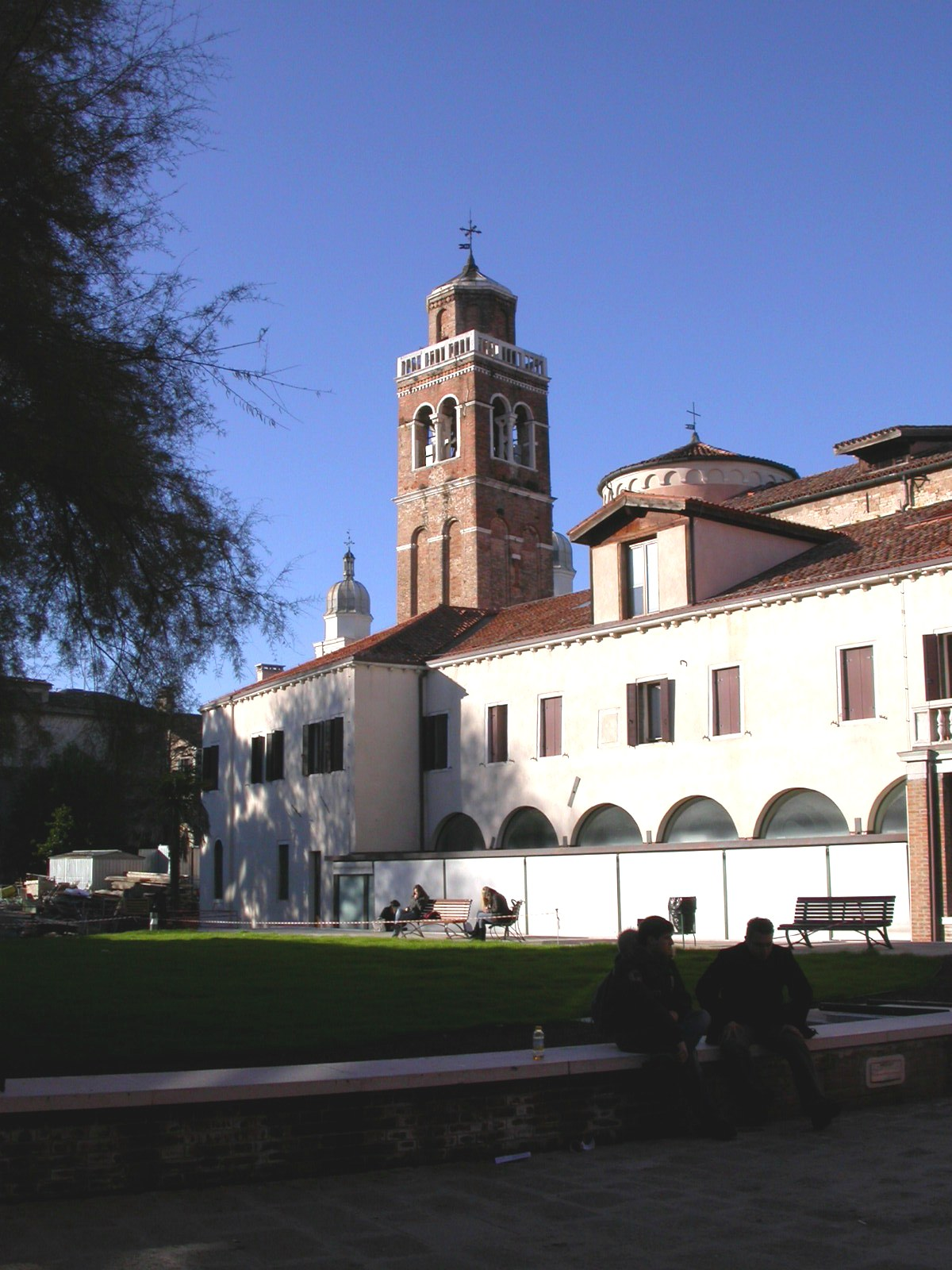
San Sebastiano Campus.

Following the establishment of a national syllabus for university teaching in 1935, the Istituto Superiore di Economia e Commercio di Venezia, as it was by then called, was authorised to award four-year laurea degrees. In 1968 it obtained university status, and the name was changed to Università degli Studi di Venezia. In the following year two new faculties were created, of industrial chemistry and of philosophy and letters.

Currently, Ca' Foscari hosts eight strategic research centers: the Center for Cultural Heritage and Technology, the Euro-Mediterranean Center on Climate Change, the European Centre for Living Technology, the Center for Humanities and Social Change, the Institute for Global Challenges, the Marco Polo Centre, the Venice Centre for Digital and Public Humanities, and the Venice Centre in Economic and Risk Analytics for Public Policies.

== Organisation ==
The university is divided into eight departments:

- Economics
- Philosophy and cultural heritage
- Management
- Environmental science, computer science and statistics
- Molecular science and nanosystems
- Linguistic and comparative cultural studies
- Humanities
- Asian and Mediterranean African studies

It also hosts the European Centre for Living Technology as well as a Law Center.

== Rankings ==
University rankings

Global – Overall
- QS World: =660 (2026)
- THE World: 601–800 (2020)
- USNWR Global: 941 (2020)

The QS World University Ranking by subject has placed Ca’ Foscari of Venice among the top 100 universities in the world for modern languages, among the top 150 in the world for humanities, and among the top 200 in the world for economics and management.

The university also ranked as the third best public university in Italy for their quality of research according to ANVUR (the National Agency for the Evaluation of University Research Systems) in 2018.

== Notable alumni ==
Among the alumni of the university are:

- Simone Albrigi, comic artist, known by the pen name “Sio”
- Michele Boldrin, economist
- Carlo Carraro, economist and Ca' Foscari's president between 2009 and 2014
- Paolo Costa, economist and politician
- Ida d'Este, educator, politician and partisan
- Giuseppe De'Longhi, businessman
- Nicolò Degiorgis, artist, publisher, curator
- Giuseppe Durato, manga artist
- Barbara Frale, historian
- Massimiliano Frani, pianist
- Mario Fratti, playwright and drama critic
- Lilli Gruber, politician, author, journalist and TV-personality
- Carla Lavatelli, Italian-American artist
- Beatrice Leanza, curator
- Giancarlo Ligabue, palaeontologist and politician
- Ugo La Malfa, politician
- Rina Macrelli, screenwriter and essayist
- Roberto Meneguzzo, banker and investor
- Damiano Michieletto, opera director
- Sara Moretto, politician
- Lionello Perera, banker, patron of the arts
- Flaminio Piccoli, politician
- Renzo Rosso, businessman, founder of the clothing brand Diesel
- Francesca Trivellato, historian
- Paul Watzlawick, philosopher and psychologist
- Lella Vignelli, architect and designer
- Guglielmo Cinque, linguist
- Homayoun Ershadi, actor and architect

== See also ==
- List of universities in Italy
