= Françoise Balibar =

French physicist (born 1941)

- Born: Françoise Dumesnil; 1941 (age 84–85)
- Education: École Normale Supérieure
- Occupations: Physicist, epistemologist
- Spouse: Étienne Balibar
- Children: Jeanne Balibar

Françoise Balibar (born Françoise Dumesnil; 1941) is a French physicist and science historian, a professor emeritus at Paris Diderot University. She has extensively published works on Albert Einstein, the theory of relativity, and the history and epistemology of physics.

== Biography ==
Françoise Balibar studied at École Normale Supérieure from 1960 to 1964. She has written numerous articles in national and international journals and led the CNRS team in charge of six volumes of the French edition of Einstein's selected works. She is also the author of several books, including The Science of Crystals and Einstein: Decoding the Universe.

She is married to philosopher Étienne Balibar and the mother of the actress Jeanne Balibar. She has appeared in two films: Mange ta soupe in 1997 and Modern Life in 2000.

== Selected publications ==
- Co-author with Jean-Marc Lévy-Leblond, Quantics: Rudiments of Quantum Physics, North-Holland, 1990
- Co-author with Jean-Pierre Maury, How Things Fly, Barron's Educational Series, 1990
- The Science of Crystals, McGraw-Hill Companies, 1992
- Einstein : La joie de la pensée, collection « Découvertes Gallimard » (nº 193), série Sciences et techniques. Éditions Gallimard, 1993 (new edition in 2011)
  - US edition – Einstein: Decoding the Universe, “Abrams Discoveries” series. Harry N. Abrams, 2001
  - UK edition – Einstein: Decoding the Universe, ‘New Horizons’ series. Thames & Hudson, 2005
- Marie Curie : Femme savante ou Sainte Vierge de la science ?, collection « Découvertes Gallimard » (nº 497), série Sciences et techniques. Éditions Gallimard, 2006
