= Pietro degli Angeli =

Italian Renaissance humanist (1517 – 1596)

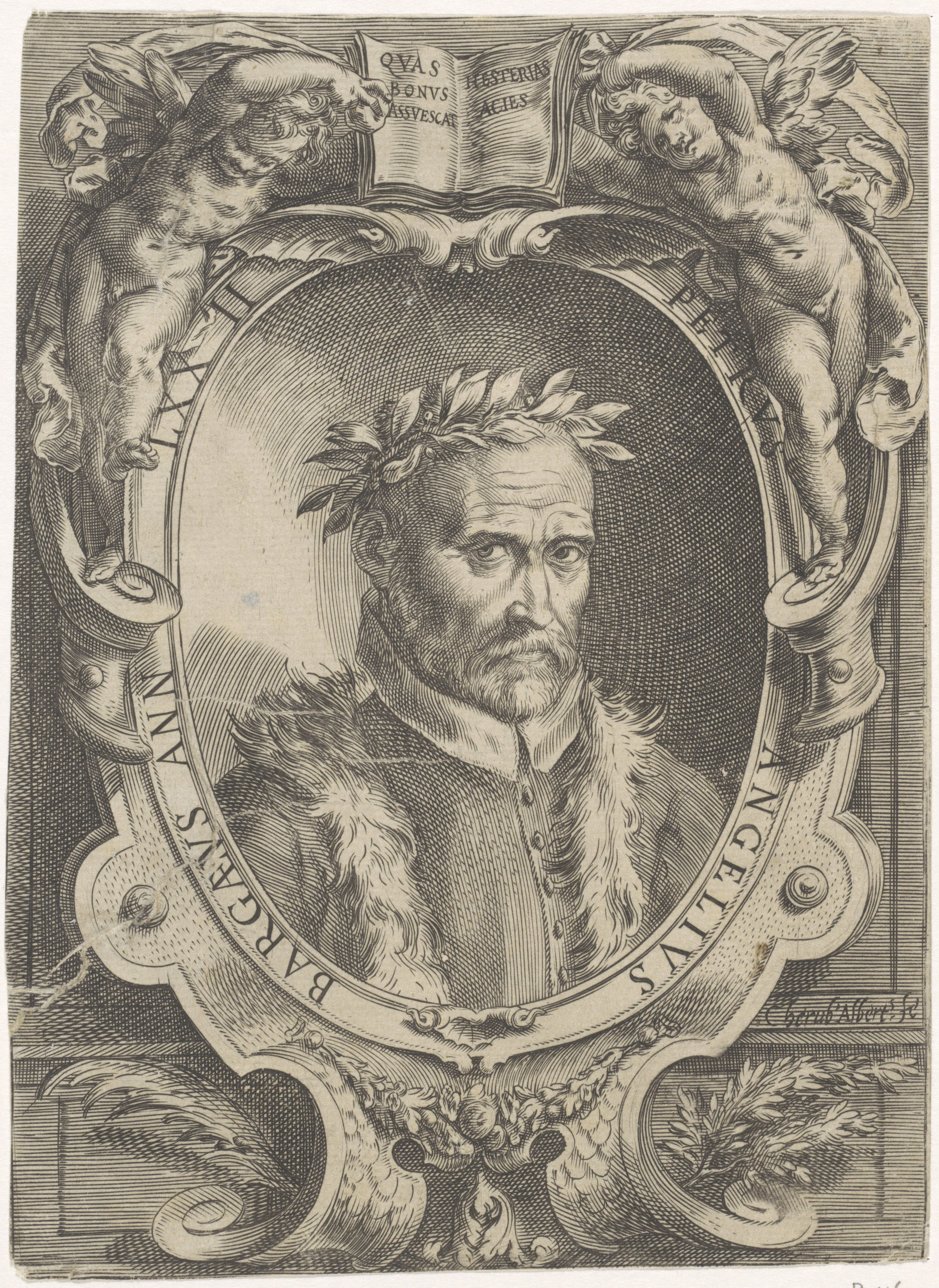
- Pietro degli Angeli
- Born: 22 April 1517; Barga, Grand Duchy of Tuscany
- Died: 29 February 1596 (aged 78); Pisa, Grand Duchy of Tuscany
- Burial place: Camposanto Monumentale, Pisa
- Occupations: Poet; Renaissance humanist; diplomat
- Parent: Iacopo di ser Niccolao Angeli

Academic background
- Education: University of Bologna
- Influences: Torquato Tasso

Academic work
- Era: Renaissance
- Institutions: University of Pisa

Pietro degli Angeli or Pier Angelio Bargeo (Latin: Petrus Angelius Bargaeus; 22 April 1517 – 29 February 1596) was an Italian Renaissance humanist and poet.

== Biography ==
A native of Barga, a little town of Tuscany, from whence he was commonly surnamed Bargaeus, Pietro degli Angeli studied law and the humanities in Bologna. A love-affair was the cause of his quitting that city, and he went to Venice. Then he undertook a journey to Constantinople, made another journey to France, and finally returned to Italy, where he was public teacher of Greek at Reggio Emilia in 1546. He was next professor at Pisa, and at the same time adviser on matters of learning to Cardinal Ferdinando de' Medici, first at Rome and later at Florence. His acquaintance was very wide among the literary men of his time, and his name is often encountered in their works. He was one of the five principal critics to whom Tasso's Jerusalem Delivered was submitted. He died at Pisa in 1596 and was buried in the Camposanto Monumentale.

== Works ==
- De Ordine legendi Scriptores Historiæ Romanæ, 1576, 4to., 1642, 8vo., and in the work of Grotius, De Studiis Instituendis, 1643, 1645; translated also into Italian, and annexed to Paolo Del Rosso’s Vite dei XII. Cesari di Suetonio, Florence, 1611, 8vo.; afterwards at Venice, 1738, 4to.
- Commentarius de Obelisco ad Sixtum Quintum, Rome, 1586, 4to., and De Privatorum Publicorumque Urbis Romæ Eversoribus Epistola, Florence, 1589, 4to. These two treatises are well known to scholars, having been inserted by Graevius in his Thesaurus Antiquitatum Romanarum, tom. IV. pp. 1869-1936.
- A short Latin narrative, drawn up from personal observation, of the expulsion of the French from Siena by Cosimo de’ Medici in 1555: De Bello Senensi Commentarius, first published, with notes by Domenico Moreni, at Florence, in 1812, 8vo.
- An Italian translation of the Oedipus Rex of Sophocles, printed at Florence in 1589, 8vo., both separately, as it would appear, and in a volume of love-poems in the same language, Poesie Toscane, by Bargaeus and Mario Colonna. Caro speaks of the translation somewhat disparagingly; but Crescimbeni pronounces it to be the best Italian translation of the Oedipus.
- Petri Angelii Bargaei Poemata omnia diligenter ab ipso recognita, Rome, Zanetti, 1585, 4to. The thick volume thus entitled contains the following pieces: 1) Cynegeticon vel de Venatione Libri sex. This poem on hunting had already been twice published, at Leyden, by Gryphius, 1562, 4to., and at Florence by the Giunti, 1568, 8vo. The Cynegeticon is Bargaeus' best-known poem. 2) Ixeuticon vel de Aucupio Liber primus, previously published at Florence by the Giunti, 1566, 4to. 3) Epithalamium in Nuptias Francisci Medicis, previously printed by the Giunti, Florence, 1566, 4to. 4) Eclogæ Quatuor. 5) Epistolarum Liber unus. 6) Carminum Libri quatuor. The Epithalamium, the eclogues, and a large number of the principal pieces among the Carmina, are in Gruter’s Deliciæ Italorum Poetarum, part I. 1608, pp. 111-159; and a selection, differing from Gruter’s only in minor particulars, will be found in the Florentine Carmina Illustrium Poetarum Italorum, t I. 1719, pp. 191-237.
- Syriados Libri sex priores. The first two books of this poem had already been printed at Paris, by order of Henry III, 1582, fol.: the six books included in this edition of 1585, adding four to the two previously published, left the work still but half-finished. The whole poem, containing twelve books, was first printed by the Giunti at Florence, 1591, 4to. There is another complete edition from the same press, 1616, 4to.; and Mazzucchelli names also a Venetian edition of 1616, in 4to. The Syriad, - an epic poem treating of the First Crusade under Godfrey of Bouillon, - is curious both for its contents and for its history. When, in 1575, Torquato Tasso sent the manuscript of the Jerusalem Delivered to Scipione Gonzaga, to be by him submitted to the critical censure of literary men in Rome, Bargaeus had just arrived in that city. He was one of those most anxiously consulted; and his name occurs frequently in the course of the interesting correspondence, in which the results of the scrutiny are recorded. Bargaeus seems to have expressed himself freely, and to have made many suggestions of alteration, some of which went very deeply into the structure of the poem. But his objections do not appear to have been either unkindly meant or unkindly taken: and Tasso himself, in the midst of the irritation into which this unhappy correspondence threw him, always speaks of the “Signor Barga” not only with deference, but even with indications of liking. The odd circumstance, however, is, that Bargaeus had long before commenced his own poem on the same theme with Tasso’s; for in his preface to the edition of 1591, he asserts that he had designed the Syriad, and had even begun to write it, nearly thirty years before. Tasso, in speaking of the Syriad long afterwards, uses expressions which seem to mean, that before having completed his own poem he was aware of the other being in progress. But in the correspondence, the Syriad is never named: and Tasso had evidently no previous personal acquaintance with its author, about whom, indeed, he asks in one place, with an amusing earnestness, whether Barga be his family name, or the name of his birthplace. It is of little importance, however, whether, and how soon, Tasso knew of the Syriad. Bargaeus was not discouraged by becoming acquainted with the Jerusalem Delivered. His self-love, indeed, was supported, not only by the praises wafted to him from France, but by the exhortations of his Florentine patron, the Cardinal Ferdinando, who hoped that a poet patronised by the House of Medici might throw into the shade a poet patronised by the House of Este. When the first two books of the Syriad were printed at Paris, the poem of Tasso, newly published, was in the highest flush of its celebrity: its reputation was probably yet greater when Bargaeus, by publishing the first half of his work in Italy itself, challenged a direct comparison. There is even reason for believing that he wrote the whole of it, except the first and second books, after the Jerusalem Delivered had been published; for the four books following these would probably have been printed with them if they had then existed; and as to the remaining six, he himself declares that he did not begin to compose them till after the marriage of Ferdinando de’ Medici, which took place in 1589. Bargaeus, was both by his example and by some of his academical discourses, a distinguished advocate of classicism. To the complete editions of his poem there are annexed a hundred pages of scholia by the Florentine philologist Roberto Titi.

== Bibliography ==
- "Angèlio, or Degli Angeli, Pietro". The Biographical Dictionary of the Society for the Diffusion of Useful Knowledge. Vol. 2 Part 2. Longman, Brown, Green, and Longmans. 1843. pp. 709–712.
- Sanleolini, Francesco (1661). "Delle lodi di Piero degli Angioli di Barga". In Carlo Roberto Dati (ed.). Prose Florentine. Vol. I Part I. pp. 151–211.
- Giammaria Mazzucchelli, Scrittori d'Italia;
- Girolamo Tiraboschi, Storia della Letteratura Italiana, 4to. ed. 1787-1794, tom. VII. part IV. p. 1462–1464.
- Francesco Saverio Quadrio, Storia e Ragione d'Ogni Poesia, II. 270. III. 103.
- Crescimbeni, Giovanni Mario. Dell'Istoria della Volgar Poesia. Vol. IV. p. 86.
- Pierre-Louis Ginguené, Histoire littéraire d'Italie, continuée par Francesco Saverio Salfi, X. 262–316.
- Adrien Baillet, Jugemens des Savans, Paris, 1686, VIII. 27. No. 1349, Poètes Modernes.
- Teissier, Antoine (1715). Éloges des hommes savans. Vol. IV. Leyden: T. Haak. p. 251.
- Brown, Peter M. (1970). "Pietro degli Angeli da Barga: "Humanista dello Studio di Pisa"". Italica. 47 (3): 285–295. doi:10.2307/478033. JSTOR 478033.
- Asor-Rosa, Alberto (1961). "ANGÈLI, Pietro". Dizionario Biografico degli Italiani (in Italian). Vol. 3: Ammirato–Arcoleo. Rome: Istituto dell'Enciclopedia Italiana. OCLC 883370.
