= ENotary =

Notary public who notarizes documents electronically

An eNotary is a notary public who notarizes documents electronically. One of the methods employed by eNotaries is the use of a digital signature and digital notary seal to notarize digital documents and validate with a digital certificate. Also known as remote online notarization (RON), electronic notarization is a process whereby a notary affixes an electronic signature and notary seal using a secure Public key to an electronic document (such as a PDF or Word document). Once affixed to the electronic document, the document is rendered tamper evident such that unauthorized attempts to alter the document will be evident to relying parties. The e-notary will use cryptography and Public key infrastructure to create, manage, distribute, use, store, and revoke the digital certificate. The Electronic Notary also must keep an electronic register of each act performed.

In most cases, electronic notarizations does not mean that the notary can perform the electronic notarizations remotely as most states still require that the participants and the notary must all be physically present at the time of signing. There are also significant benefits to having the notarizations done electronically such as cost savings, superior security, authenticity, audit trails, and document integrity, which are things that are not available to paper based notarizations.

== Jurisdiction ==
=== United States ===
Much of this variation reflects uneven state adoption of the Uniform Law Commission's Revised Uniform Law on Notarial Acts (RULONA), first approved in 2010 and amended in 2018 to add a framework for remote online notarization. By the end of 2018, RULONA (2010) had been enacted in 12 states, and 9 states had separately passed their own remote notarization laws.

Currently, laws regarding eNotarizations vary by jurisdiction and are permitted in, at least, Arizona, California, Colorado, Delaware, Florida, Georgia, Indiana, Kansas, Kentucky, Michigan, Minnesota, New Mexico, North Carolina, Oregon, Pennsylvania, Texas, Utah, Wisconsin, and Virginia.

The COVID-19 pandemic drove rapid expansion of remote online notarization. By mid-April 2020, at least 43 states had authorized it in some form, permanently or temporarily. As of 2026, the American Land Title Association (ALTA) reported that 48 states and the District of Columbia had passed a permanent law or executive order authorizing it, with California becoming the 45th state to do so in September 2023.

=== Canada ===
In Quebec, remote notarization has been possible since March 27, 2020, when the provincial government adopted a ministerial order allowing electronic signatures to complete notarial acts, a measure taken to avoid interrupting real estate transactions during the COVID-19 pandemic.

=== Austria ===
In Austria, remote online notarization is regulated under § 69b of the Notariatsordnung (Notarial Code). The law permits the execution of notarial acts electronically, provided that adequate technical means are available. The law mandates that:

- The identity of parties who are not physically present must be verified using a secure electronic process, either via a government-issued photo ID in a video-assisted electronic procedure or through a legally prescribed method that provides equivalent identification.
- The notarial act must comply with the regulations for electronically created notarial deeds, with modifications as specified in the law.

=== Germany ===
Germany regulates electronic notarization through § 33 of the Bundesnotarordnung (BNotO).

The law states that:

- Notaries must use a qualified electronic signature issued by a qualified trust service provider.
- The signature must be certified in a way that verifies the notary's office location and jurisdiction.
- The electronic signing process must use a secure cryptographic device that prevents unauthorized access.
- The notary is prohibited from sharing their cryptographic keys or authentication credentials with any third party.

== Remote eNotary ==
On July 1, 2012, Virginia became the first state to authorize a signer to be in a remote location and have a document notarized electronically by an e-notary using audio-visual conference technology (webcam), by passing the bills SB 827 and HB 2318. Commercial services offering notarization by webcam were reported around the same period. In 2011, TechCrunch reported that the electronic signature company SignNow operated NotaryNow, a service that connected users to a notary by webcam in order to notarize documents.

In Virginia the case of an electronic notarization, "satisfactory evidence of identity" may be based on video and audio conference technology, in accordance with the standards for electronic video and audio communications set out in subdivisions B 1, B 2, and B 3, that permits the notary to communicate with and identify the principal at the time of the notarial act, provided that such identification is confirmed by (a) personal knowledge, (b) an antecedent in-person identity proofing process in accordance with the specifications of the Federal Bridge Certification Authority, or (c) a valid digital certificate accessed by biometric data or by use of an interoperable personal identity verification card that is designed, issued, and managed in accordance with the specifications published by the National Institute of Standards and Technology and in Federal Information Processing Standards.

== Legality ==
The National Association of Secretaries of State (NASS) affirms the role of the Secretary of State or other state notary commissioning entity as the sole authority to establish standards enabling electronic notarizations that will protect signature credibility, avoid identity fraud and provide accountability to the public in order to promote secure electronic commerce.
