= Carofiglio =

Carofiglio is an Italian family name meaning "dear son".

== People ==
- Desiree Carofiglio (born 2000), Italian artistic gymnast
- Dora Carofiglio (born 1963), alias Valerie Dore, Italian singer
- Francesco Carofiglio (born 1964), Italian architect, writer and director
- Gianrico Carofiglio (born 1961), Italian novelist and former judge
