= Involuntary Witness =

- Author: Gianrico Carofiglio
- Original title: Testimone Inconsapevole
- Translator: Patrick Creagh
- Language: Italian
- Series: Guido Guerrieri #1
- Genre: Legal thriller novel
- Publisher: Bitter Lemon Press
- Publication date: 2002
- Publication place: Italy
- English publication date: July 2005
- Media type: Print (Hardback & Paperback)
- Pages: 274 pp
- ISBN: 1-904738-07-9
- OCLC: 62353862
- Dewey Decimal: 853/.92 22
- LC Class: PQ4903.A665 T4713 2005

Involuntary Witness (Italian: Testimone Inconsapevole) is a legal thriller by Italian writer Gianrico Carofiglio, published originally in 2002 and translated into English by Patrick Creagh in 2005.
