= Premio Brancati =

Italian literary award

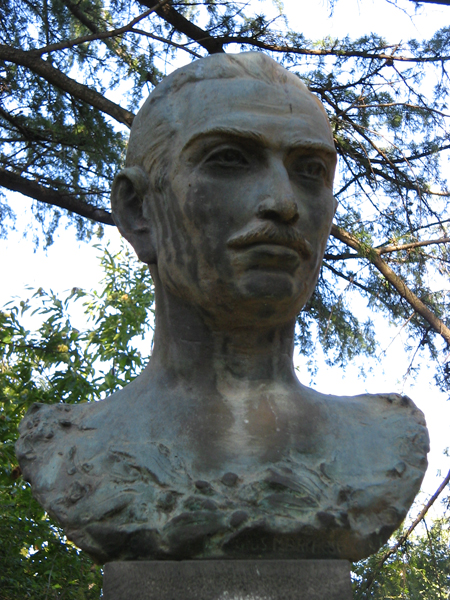
Bust of Vitaliano Brancati

The Premio Brancati Zafferana, more concisely known as the Premio Brancati, is a literary prize named in memory of the Italian writer Vitaliano Brancati.

== Background ==
The Premio Brancati was launched in 1967. Originally a single award, the prize has been given since 1996 in the categories of narrative fiction, non-fiction, poetry, and, since 2015, emerging young writer. The winners in each category are announced over the course of several days at a convention held in September every year in Zafferana Etnea in Sicily, Italy, where Brancati customarily spent part of each year and where one of his novels, Paolo il caldo, was set.
