= John Florio Prize =

Award for Italian translators

John Florio Prize for Italian Translation
- Sponsored by: Society of Authors, Italian Cultural Institute, Arts Council England
- Country: United Kingdom
- Established: 1963
- Website: https://www2.societyofauthors.org/prizes/translation-prizes/italian-john-florio-prize/

The John Florio Prize for Italian translation is awarded by the Society of Authors, with the co-sponsorship of the Italian Cultural Institute and Arts Council England. Named after the Tudor Anglo-Italian writer-translator John Florio, the prize was established in 1963. As of 1980 it is awarded biannually for the best English translation of a full-length work of literary merit and general interest from Italian.

== Winners and shortlistees ==
=== 1960–1979 annual run ===
Year	Translator	Work	Reference
1963	Donata Origo	The Deserter by Giuseppe Dessi	
1963	Eric Mosbacher	Hekura by Fosco Maraini	
1964	Angus Davidson	More Roman Tales by Alberto Moravia	
1964	H. S. Vere-Hodge	The Odes of Dante	
1964	Professor E. R. Vincent	A Diary of One of Garibaldi's Thousand by Giuseppe Cesare Abba	
1965	W. H. Darwell	Dongo: The Last Act by Pier Luigi Bellini delle Stelle & Urbano Lazzaro	
1966	Stuart Woolf	The Truce by Primo Levi	
1966	Jane Grigson and Father Kenelm Foster	The Columns of Infamy of Crime and Punishments by Cesare Beccaria	
1967	Isabel Quigly	The Transfers by Silvano Ceccherini	
1968	Muriel Grindrod	The Popes in the 20th Century by Carlo Falconi	
1968	Raleigh Trevelyan	The Outlaws by Luigi Meneghello	
1969	Sacha Rabinovitch	Francis Bacon: from Magic to Science by Paolo Rossi	
1969	William Weaver	A Violent Life by Pier Pasolini	
1970	Angus Davidson	On Neoclassicism by Mario Praz	
1971	William Weaver	The Heron by Giorgio Bassani	
1971	William Weaver	Time and the Hunter by Italo Calvino	
1972	Patrick Creagh	Selected Poems by Giuseppe Ungaretti	
1973	Bernard Wall	Wrestling with Christ by Luigi Santucci	
1974	Stephen M. Hellman	Letters from Inside the Italian Communist Party by Maria Antonietta Macciocchi	
1975	Cormac O’Cuilleanain	Cagliostro by Roberto Gervaso	
1976	Frances Frenaye	The Forests of Norbio by Giuseppe Dessi	
1977	Ruth Feldman & Brian Swann	Shema, Collected Poems of Primo Levi	
1979	Quintin Hoare	Selections from Political Writings 1921–26 by Antonio Gramsci	

=== 1980–2004 biennial winners ===
Year	Writer	Work	Reference
1980	Julian Mitchell	Henry IV by Pirandello	
1982	Christopher Holme	Ebla: An Empire Rediscovered by Paolo Matthiae	
1984	Bruce Penman	China (The moments of civilisation) by Gildo Fossati	
1986	Avril Bardoni	The Wine Dark Sea by Leonardo Sciascia	
1988	J. G. Nichols	The Colloquies by Guido Gozzano	
1990	Patrick Creagh	Danube by Claudio Magris	
1990	Patrick Creagh	Blind Argus by Gesualdo Bufalino	
1992	William Weaver	The Dust Roads of Monferrato by Rosetta Loy	
1992	Tim Parks	Sweet Days of Discipline by Fleur Jaeggy	
1994	Tim Parks	The Road to San Giovanni by Italo Calvino	
1996	Emma Rose	His Mother's House by Marta Morazzoni	
1998	Joseph Farrell	Take-off by Daniele del Giudice	
2000	Martin McLaughlin	Why Read the Classics? by Italo Calvino	
2002	Stephen Sartarelli	Prince of the Clouds by Gianni Riotta	
2002	Alastair McEwen	Senior Service by Carlo Feltrinelli	
2004	Howard Curtis	Coming Back by Edoardo Albinati	

=== 2006–present biennial winners, runners-up, and shortlisted works ===
= winner

Year	Writer	Work	Result	Reference
2006	Carol O’Sullivan and Martin Thom	Kuraj by Silvia Di Natale	Winner	
2006	Aubrey Botsford	The Ballad of the Low Lifes by Enrico Remmert	Runner-up	
2008	Peter Robinson	The Greener Meadow by Luciano Erba	Winner	
2008	Alastair McEwen	Turning Back the Clock by Umberto Eco	Runner-up	
2010	Jamie McKendrick	The Embrace: Selected Poems by Valerio Magrelli	Winner	
2010	Abigail Asher	The Natural Order of Things by Andrea Canobbio	Runner-up	
2012	Anne Milano Appel	Scent of a Woman by Giovanni Arpino	Winner	
2012	Howard Curtis	In the Sea There are Crocodiles by Fabio Geda	Commended	
2012	Shaun Whiteside	Stabat Mater by Tiziano Scarpa	Commended	
2014	Patrick Creagh	Memory of the Abyss by Marcello Fois	Winner	
2014	Cristina Viti	A Life Apart by Mariapia Veladiano	Commended	
2016	Jamie McKendrick	Archipelago by Antonella Anedda	Winner	
2016	Richard Dixon	Numero Zero by Umberto Eco	Commended	
2018	Gini Alhadeff	I Am the Brother of XX by Fleur Jaeggy	Winner	
2018	Cristina Viti	Stigmata by Gëzim Hajdari	Runner-up	
2018	Jamie McKendrick	Within the Walls by Giorgio Bassani	Shortlisted	
2018	Mario Petrucci	Xenia by Eugenio Montale	Shortlisted	
2018	Cristina Viti	The World Saved by Kids by Elsa Morante	Shortlisted	
2020	Jhumpa Lahiri	Trick by Domenico Starnone	Winner	
2020	Jenny McPhee	The Kremlin Ball by Curzio Malaparte	Runner-up	
2020	Anne Milano Appel	A Devil Comes to Town by Paolo Maurensig	Shortlisted	
2020	Ekin Oklap	Flowers Over the Inferno by Ilaria Tuti	Shortlisted	
2020	Taije Silverman and Marina Della Putta Johnson	Selected Poems of Giovanni Pascoli by Giovanni Pascoli	Shortlisted	
2020	Howard Curtis	Soul of the Border by Matteo Righetto	Shortlisted	
2022	Nicholas Benson and Elena Coda	My Karst and My City by Scipio Slataper	Winner	
2022	J Ockenden	Snow, Dog, Foot by Claudio Morandini	Runner-up	
2022	Tim Parks	The House on The Hill and The Moon and the Bonfires by Cesare Pavese	Runner-up	
2022	Elena Pala	The Hummingbird by Sandro Veronesi	Shortlisted	
2022	Stash Luczkwi	Without Ever Reaching the Summit by Paolo Cognetti	Shortlisted	
2022	Stephen Twilley	Diary of a Foreigner in Paris by Curzio Malaparte	Shortlisted	

== 2024 judges ==
=== Maame Blue ===
Maame Blue is a creative writing tutor and author of the novel Bad Love, which won the 2021 Betty Trask award. Her short stories have been published in three anthologies and her writing has appeared in Writers Mosaic, Refinery29 and The Author Magazine. Her second novel The Rest Of You will be published by Amistad (US) and Verve Books (UK) in Autumn 2024.

=== Jamie McKendrick ===
Jamie McKendrick was born in Liverpool in 1955. He is the author of six collections of poetry, including The Marble Fly, winner of the Forward Prize for Best Collection and a Poetry Book Society Choice; Ink Stone, shortlisted for the T.S. Eliot Prize and the Whitbread Poetry Award; and Crocodiles & Obelisks, shortlisted for the Forward Prize. Out There won the Hawthornden Prize. An earlier selection of his poems was published as Sky Nails, and he is editor of 20th-Century Italian Poems. The Embrace, his translations of Valerio Magrelli’s poetry, won the Oxford-Weidenfeld and the John Florio prizes.

=== Sandra Silipo ===
Sandra Silipo has been studying and working with languages for over 30 years. She has a BA in Classics, an MA in Translation and an MA in Applied Linguistics. She has worked for the language industry in a variety of roles: as an associate lecturer and author for the Open University, as a free-lance translator, as a principal examiner for the IBO, as a language teacher and as a teachers’ trainer. Her profession has taught her that every word and every language tells a story. She loves to spend her time listening to those stories, and retelling them.
