= Don Giovanni in Sicilia =

Don Giovanni in Sicilia may refer to:

- Don Giovanni in Sicilia (novel), a 1941 novel by Vitaliano Brancati
- Don Juan in Sicily, a 1967 film by Alberto Lattuada based on Brancati's novel
