= Umberto Zanotti Bianco =

Italian archaeologist, environmentalist and lifetime senator

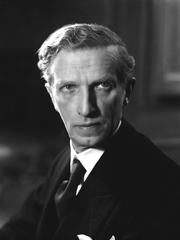
- Born: 22 January 1889; Chania, Greece
- Died: 28 August 1963 (aged 74); Rome, Italy
- Education: University of Turin
- Occupation: Archeologist
- Known for: Senator for life (1952), Founder of Italia Nostra

Umberto Zanotti Bianco (22 January 1889 – 28 August 1963) was an Italian historian social activist. He was once President of the Italian Red Cross.

== Career ==
In 1920, Umberto Zanotti Bianco founded the Società Magna Grecia. In 1955, he co-founded the Italian patrimonial non-profit Italia Nostra along with Pietro Paolo Trompeo, Giorgio Bassani, Desideria Pasolini dall'Onda, Elena Croce, Luigi Magnani, and Hubert Howard,
