= Jamie McKendrick =

British poet and translator (born 1955)

Jamie McKendrick (born 27 October 1955) is a British poet and translator.

== Early life and education ==
McKendrick was born in Liverpool and educated at Bootham School, a Quaker school in York, and Liverpool College. He studied English literature at the University of Nottingham where he was tutored by Tom Paulin and John Lucas in English and by Alastair Smart and John Wilton-Ely in the History of Art. After graduating from Nottingham, he began a BLitt at the University of Oxford on the poetry of Hart Crane, though he never completed this degree.

== Career ==
In 1978 he moved to a housing co-operative in Hackney, London and worked as a visiting lecturer in American literature at the Roehampton Institute before leaving academia to work as a plasterer and decorator in London. He returned to academia in 1985 as a lettore at the University of Salerno. He returned to the UK in 1989 and took up various building and teaching jobs in Liverpool, London and Oxford. From 1992 to 1996 he was writer-in-residence at Hertford College, Oxford. He has held writer-in-residence posts at the University of Gothenburg, Masaryk University in Brno, the University of Nottingham, and University College London. He has taught for the Oxford programmes of Stanford University and Sarah Lawrence College and for over ten years has offered a translation workshop for Oxford University's Creative Writing MSt.

McKendrick’s papers are held by the British Library.

== Poetry ==
McKendrick has published eight collections of poetry and two Selected Poems. He is also the editor of The Faber Book of 20th-Century Italian Poems (2004).

== Criticism ==
McKendrick has written reviews and essays on literature and art for numerous newspapers and magazines, including The Observer, TLS, the LRB, Independent on Sunday, Poetry Review, Poetry Ireland Review, Athenaeum Review (US), Subtropics (US), and Modern Painters. His essays have been published in several books including: Elizabeth Bishop: Poet of the Periphery (Bloodaxe, 2002); Writers on Art (DK, 2002); Literary Activism: A Symposium (Boiler House Press, 2017). He has also written catalogue essays for Donald Wilkinson (Wordsworth Trust, 2002), Arturo Di Stefano (Purdey Hicks Gallery, 2012), and an introduction to Tom Lubbock's English Graphic (Frances Lincoln, 2012).

A collection of his writings on art, poetry and translation, The Foreign Connection, was published by Legenda in 2020, ISBN 978-1-78188-500-0

== Translations ==
McKendrick has translated six books of fiction by the Italian novelist Giorgio Bassani (including The Garden of the Finzi-Continis), published as individual volumes by Penguin and in a collected edition by Penguin and by Norton in the US.

He is the editor of and a major contributor to The Faber Book of 20th-Century Italian Poems (2004) and has published book length translations of the poems of Valerio Magrelli and Antonella Anedda as well as a verse play by Pier Paolo Pasolini.

== Artwork ==
McKendrick’s paintings have appeared on several of his book covers such as The Sirocco Room, The Kiosk on the Brink, Sky Nails and The Foreign Connection. His self-illustrated chapbook of poems, The Years, illustrated predominantly in ink and watercolour, won the Michael Marks Illustration Award in 2020.

He has held numerous exhibitions, including at the Verandah Gallery in Oxford (1992 and 1999) and the Mary Ogilvie Gallery of St Anne's, Oxford (2015 and 2021). His work has also been a part of group shows, the two most recent being Lines & Marks: A Group Drawing Show at the Lewes Gallery in Sussex (2025) and Story Painters, Picture Writers at Kendrew Barn, St John's College, Oxford (2026).

== Prizes and honours ==
McKendrick was named as one of the Poetry Society's 'New Generation' poets in the 1990s, with the Society selecting his 1997 collection The Marble Fly as a Poetry Society Book Choice. It also won the Forward Prize for Best Collection. McKendrick's collections have been shortlisted for the 1997 and 2003 T. S. Eliot Prize, the 2003 Whitbread Poetry Award and the 2007 Forward Poetry Prize. His translations of Giorgio Bassani were shortlisted for the Oxford-Weidenfeld prize and for the John Florio award.

- 2020: Michael Marks Illustration Award, for The Years
- 2020: Michael Marks Poetry Pamphlet Award, shortlisting for The Years
- 2019: Cholmondeley Award
- 2016: John Florio Italian Translation Award for Antonella Anedda's Archipelago
- 2014: Named Fellow of the Royal Society of Literature
- 2013: Hawthornden Prize for Out There
- 2010: John Florio Italian Translation Award for Valerio Magrelli's The Embrace
- 2010: Oxford-Weidenfeld Translation Prize for Valerio Magrelli's The Embrace
- 2005: Cavaliere OSSI (Ordine della Stella della Solidarietà Italiana)
- 2003: Society of Authors Travel Award
- 1997: Forward Prize for Best Collection for The Marble Fly
- 1994: Southern Prize for Literature for The Kiosk on the Brink
- 1991: Arts Council, Writers' Award
- 1984: Eric Gregory Award

== Bibliography ==
=== Poetry collections ===
- 2024: Drypoint (Faber and Faber)
- 2020: The Years with pamphlet illustrated by the author (Arc Publications)
- 2018: Anomaly (Faber and Faber)
- 2017: Repairwork (Clutag Press, 5 poems series)
- 2016: Selected Poems (Faber and Faber)
- 2015: The Hunters, a pamphlet with French and Italian translations by Gilles Ortlieb and Antonella Anedda (Incline Press)
- 2012: Out There (Faber and Faber)
- 2007: Crocodiles & Obelisks (Faber and Faber)
- 2003: Ink Stone (Faber and Faber)
- 2000: Sky Nails: Poems 1979–1997 (Faber and Faber)
- 1997: The Marble Fly (Oxford University Press)
- 1993: The Kiosk on the Brink (Oxford University Press)
- 1991: The Sirocco Room (Oxford University Press)

=== Translations ===
- 2018: Giorgio Bassani: The Novel of Ferrara (Penguin; Norton)
- 2018: Giorgio Bassani: The Heron (Penguin)
- 2017: Giorgio Bassani: Behind the Door (Penguin)
- 2016: Giorgio Bassani: Within the Walls (Penguin)
- 2016: Antonella Anedda: Archipelago (Bloodaxe)
- 2014: Giorgio Bassani: The Smell of Hay (Penguin)
- 2012: Giorgio Bassani: The Gold-Rimmed Spectacles (Penguin)
- 2010: David Huerta: Poemas/Poems (Poetry Translation Centre pamphlet)
- 2010: Pier Paolo Pasolini: Fabrication, a translation of the verse play Affabulazione (Oberon). Performed at The Print Room, London in 2010, directed by Lucy Bailey.
- 2009: Valerio Magrelli: The Embrace: Selected Poems (Faber and Faber; republished in a bilingual edition as Vanishing Points by Farrar Straus Giroux, 2011)
- 2007: Giorgio Bassani: The Garden of the Finzi-Continis (Penguin; republished by Folio, 2014)

=== Work translated ===
McKendrick's poems have appeared in translation in France, Italy, Germany, Sweden, Holland, Turkey, Iran, India, Portugal, Spain, and Argentina. Other translations have been published as books in Holland, Italy, South Korea, Sweden and Spain:

- 2023: The Years, Korean translation and afterword by Jongsook Lee (Gang)
- 2022: Gli anni, translated by Antonella Anedda (Coup d’idée, Edizioni d'Arte)
- 2021: Un perro verde, translated by Nieves García Prados (Valparaíso, Granada)
- 2020: En förlorad stad, translated by Lars-Håkan Svensson and Lasse Söderberg (Bokförlaget Faethon, Stockholm)
- 2003: Chiodi di cielo, translated by L.Luca Guerneri and A. Antonella Anedda (Donzelli, Rome)
- 2000: Een versteende dierentuin: Gedichten translated by Ko Kooman (Wagner & Van Santen, Sliedrecht)
