= Isabel Quigly =

British writer and translator (1926–2018)

Elizabeth (Isabel) Madeleine Quigly FRSL (17 September 1926 – 14 September 2018) was a British writer, translator and film critic.

== Early life and education ==
Quigly was born in Ontaneda, Spain, younger daughter of Richard Quigly, a railway engineer of Irish descent, and his wife Clarice, for whom her elder sister, usually known as "Cita", was named. Quigly was named "Elizabeth" by her parents- under this name being registered with British authorities- but the Catholic priest who baptised her insisted Elizabeth was not a real name and named her "Isabel". Although initially raised in considerable material comfort- boarding at the exclusive Assumption Convent on Kensington Square in London, accompanied by her beloved Spanish nanny, Tuki- her father was financially ruined; although she and her sister were kept on at the convent with fees waived, they were "made to feel socially inferior". Quigly was subsequently educated at Godolphin School, Salisbury and, having "won scholarships from five different bodies", went up to Newnham College, Cambridge. She was one of the first cohort of women to be awarded a full degree.

== Career ==
In her early career, Quigly worked for Penguin Books and Red Cross Geneva. Between 1956 and 1966, she was film critic of The Spectator. She served as literary editor of The Tablet from 1985 to 1997. She also contributed to numerous journals and newspapers, and served on the jury of various literary prizes including the Booker Prize jury in 1986.

In 1953, her first book, and only novel, The Eye of Heaven, was published. Other books include The Heirs of Tom Brown: The English School Story and Charlie Chaplin: Early Comedies. She also translated more than 100 books from Italian, Spanish and French. Her most notable translations are Silvano Ceccherini's The Transfer, for which, in 1967, she won the John Florio Prize, and Giorgio Bassani's The Garden of the Finzi-Continis. According to Robin Healey's Twentieth-Century Italian Literature in English Translation, Quigly was one of the top 10 translators of Italian literature of the last 70 years, alongside Archibald Colquhoun, Patrick Creagh, Angus Davidson, Frances Frenaye, Stuart Hood, Eric Mosbacher, Raymond Rosenthal, Bernard Wall and William Weaver.

== Personal life ==
The Eye of Heaven was autobiographical, based on Quigly's "impulsive and ultimately ill-fated marriage" to "impoverished but aristocratic sculptor" Raffaello Salimbeni, of Sienese origin and ten years her senior, whom she had met and fallen in love with when in Florence. Already engaged to be married to another man, and with a position as a university lecturer awaiting her in Johannesburg, South Africa, she instead married Salimbeni, with whom she had a son, Crispin; shortly after his birth his parents separated. Quigly "never allowed her son to see his father and could never herself return to Florence again. The story of her failed marriage was not one she liked to talk about." Nevertheless, she and Salimbeni- who died in 1991- remained in contact, corresponding frequently; a trunkful of Quigly's letters contained an 80-page letter from Salimbeni. Although they apparently only met once after their marriage ended, Quigly was "terribly distressed" at his death; a letter from him arrived thereafter.

Quigly and her son, Crispin, shared a close bond, working together on property renovations in Cambridge during his time as an undergraduate there, and later in south-west London.

Quigly died in Haywards Heath on 14 September 2018.

== Selected translations ==
- Silvano Ceccherini: The Transfer (John Florio Prize)
- Giorgio Bassani: The Garden of the Finzi-Continis
- Giorgio Bassani: A Prospect of Ferrara
- Giorgio Bassani: The Gold-Rimmed Spectacles
- Alba de Céspedes: Between Then and Now
- Alba de Céspedes: La Bambolona
- Alba de Céspedes: The Secret
- Antonio Cossu: The Sardinian Hostage
- Attilio Veraldi: The Payoff
- Carlo Cassola: Fausto and Anna
- Carlo Monterosso: The Salt of the Earth
- Carlo Picchio: Freedom Fighter
- Elena Bono: The Widow of Pilate
- Elsa Morante: Arturo's Island
- Ercole Patti: That Wonderful November
- Fabio Carpi: The Abandoned Places
- Fausta Cialente: The Levantines
- Fortunato Seminara: The Wind in the Olive Grove
- Giuliana Pandolfi Boldrini: The Etruscan Leopards
- Giuseppe Dessì: The House at San Silvano
- Goffredo Parise: Solitudes
- Livia Svevo: Memoir of Italo Svevo
- Lorenza Mazzetti: Rage
- Luigi Magnani: Beethoven's Nephew
- Luigi Preti: Through the Fascist Fire
- Michele Prisco: A Spiral of Mist
- Nino Palumbo: The Bribe
- Nino Palumbo: Tomorrow Will be Better
- Oliviero Honore Bianchi: Devil's Night
- Oriana Fallaci: Nothing, and So Be It
- Renato Ghiotto: The Slave
- Sergio Donati: The Paper Tomb
- Uberto Paolo Quintavalle: On the Make
- Georges Simenon: The Family Lie
