= Francesco Carofiglio =

Italian architect, writer and director

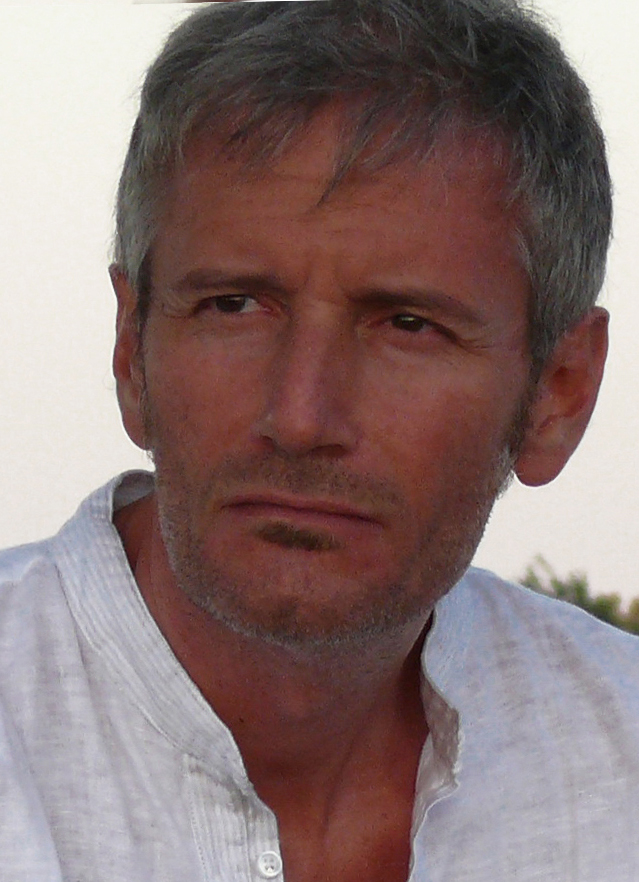

Francesco Carofiglio (born 4 July 1964) is an Italian architect, writer and director. Son of writer Enza Buono and brother of writer and member of the Italian Senate Gianrico Carofiglio.

== Biography ==
Francesco Carofiglio was born in Bari, Italy. He started working as actor and illustrator during his high school years. He earned his B.A. in architecture at universita' di Firenze, Italy while moving his first steps with scenography and directing. During those years, he collaborated with Giorgio Albertazzi, Ugo Chiti, Gabriele Ferzetti, Torao Suzuki, Egisto Marcucci, among others. Since then, he has been writing plays without interrupting his activity as architect and illustrator. The "Fondazione Nazionale Carlo Collodi" has hosted an exhibition of Carofiglio's illustrations of Pinocchio. As architect, he has been designing exhibitions, picture galleries and performance spaces. He also writes screenplays for Italian cinema and TV.

In 2007, he co-authored the screenplay Il passato è una terra straniera, (from the book The Past is a foreign Country) produced by Fandango, starring Elio Germano and Michele Riondino, directed by Daniele Vicari won the "Gran premio della Giuria" as best film at the Miami Film Festival, Florida 2009.

From 2002 to 2005 Carofiglio directed the University of Bari acting school. His short movies won a number of national and international awards.

== Novels ==
His first novel With or without you (in Italian with an English title) was published by BUR Rizzoli in 2005. Again with Rizzoli, Francesco and his brother Gianrico released their first graphic novel, Cacciatori nelle tenebre, 2007. The following year Marsilio released L'estate del cane nero (premio LibriaMola 2008) and in 2009 Ritorno nella valle degli angeli (Marsilio, (premio Fenice Europa, premio “Antonio Sebastiani” Città di Minturno, Premio Stresa 2010 per la Narrativa). He later published also Radiopirata, Marsilio, 2011; Wok, Piemme, 2013; La casa nel bosco, con Gianrico Carofiglio, Rizzoli, 2014; Voglio vivere una volta sola, Piemme, 2014. This latest novel, inspired "Sister Never Born", the second track of "Left-To-Live", the next album of the Italian band of psycho-progressive rock Twenty Four Hours out for Musea in March 2016. The video preview was published on 31 October 2015 on YouTube.
