= The Garden of the Finzi-Continis =

Novel by Giorgio Bassani

- First edition (Italian)
- Author: Giorgio Bassani
- Original title: Il giardino dei Finzi-Contini
- Translator: Isabel Quigly
- Language: Italian
- Genre: Historical novel
- Publisher: Einaudi; English: Atheneum
- Publication date: 1962
- Publication place: Italy
- English publication date: 1965
- Media type: Print (Hardback & Paperback)

The Garden of the Finzi-Continis (Italian: Il giardino dei Finzi-Contini) is an Italian historical novel by Giorgio Bassani, published in 1962. It chronicles the relationships between the narrator and the children of the Finzi-Contini family from the rise of Benito Mussolini until the start of World War II.

== Background ==
The Garden of the Finzi-Continis is considered the best of the series of novels that Bassani produced about the lives of Italian Jews in the northern Italian city of Ferrara. Although the novel focuses on the relationships between the major characters, the shadow of creeping Italian fascism, especially the racial laws that restricted Jews' participation in Italian society, looms over all the novel's events. According to Bassani, one hundred and eighty-three Jews living in Ferrara were deported to German concentration camps, predominantly under the puppet Italian Social Republic in 1943.

== Plot summary ==
The novel opens with a brief prologue set in 1957 in which the narrator, an Italian Jew, describes a visit to the Jewish cemetery of Ferrara where the Finzi-Contini family mausoleum stands, empty in all but two slots: a young child, Guido, who died of illness before the narrator was born; and Alberto, the son of the Finzi-Continis and a friend of the narrator's, who died of lymphogranulomatosis (Hodgkin's disease) before the mass deportation that sent the remainder of the family to a concentration camp in Germany. At this point, the narrator reveals that none of the Finzi-Continis survived.

The first part of the book covers the narrator's childhood experiences, describing the various social circles of the local Jewish population and the mystery around the Finzi-Contini children, Alberto and Micòl, who were schooled separately from the other Jewish children and who only appeared at the main school for the annual exams. The narrator fails his math test in this particular year, the first time he has failed any of the annual exams required for promotion, and he takes off on his bike out of fear of his father's reaction. He ends up outside the walls of the Finzi-Continis' mansion, where he has a conversation with Micòl, the Finzi-Continis' pretty daughter. The narrator is invited by Micòl to enter the garden. He excuses himself out of concern for the safety of his bicycle. She then comes over the wall to show him a safe hiding place, but while hiding his bike he dallies in contemplation of Micòl - and loses his chance to see the garden until years later.

The next two parts of the book cover the years when the children are all in or just out of college. The racial laws have restricted their ability to socialize with the Ferrarese Christians, and so the narrator, Alberto, Micòl, and Giampi Malnate (an older Christian friend with socialist views) form an informal tennis club of their own, playing several times a week at the court in the Finzi-Continis' garden. During these visits, the narrator declares, shyly at first but more and more forcefully, his love for Micòl. However, her attitude towards the narrator remains one of friendship so that the relationship slowly peters out.

The final section of the book covers the slow fading of the narrator's involvement in the tennis club, his futile attempts to restart the romance with Micòl, and his growing friendship with Malnate whom he suspects at the end of the book of having an affair with Micòl.

== English translations ==
There are at least three English translations of the novel: the first by Isabel Quigly (Atheneum, 1965, mentioned above), one by William Weaver (Quartet Books, 1974) and one by Jamie McKendrick (Penguin, 2007),

== Adaptations ==
Vittorio De Sica's 1970 film adaptation stars Lino Capolicchio as Giorgio (the narrator), Dominique Sanda as Micòl, Fabio Testi as Malnate, and Helmut Berger as Alberto. It won the Academy Award for Best Foreign Language Film and was nominated for Best Screenplay (based on material from another medium). It won the Golden Bear at the Berlin Festival.

New York City Opera and the National Yiddish Theatre Folksbiene premiered an operatic adaptation by Ricky Ian Gordon (music) and Michael Korie (libretto) on 27 January 2022, conducted by James Lowe at Edmond J. Safra Hall in the Museum of Jewish Heritage, Manhattan.
