= Stanley Hochman =

American editor and translator of European literature

Stanley Hochman (November 4, 1924 – August 10, 2014) was an editor for several New York City publishing houses and also a translator of European literature and nonfiction. Hochman's final editorial position was as Senior Editor at the former Frederick Ungar Publishing Company, which was acquired by Continuum Publishing in 1985, subsequently absorbed into Bloomsbury Publishing. Earlier in his career, he had held editorial positions at McGraw-Hill, Walker and Company, and several industrial trade magazines.

Hochman was the founding editor of the Ungar Film Library, an extension of that firm's Library of Literary Criticism. He personally edited several titles in the line, including American Film Directors (published in 1974 as the first and only volume of the projected series A Library of Film Criticism) and From Quasimodo to Scarlett O'Hara: A National Board of Review Anthology, 1920–1940 (1982). For McGraw-Hill, Hochman edited the five-volume McGraw-Hill Encyclopedia of World Drama: An International Reference Work in 5 Volumes (2nd ed. 1984). McGraw-Hill also published his work for popular readers Yesterday and Today: A Dictionary of Recent American History (1979, reissued twice since by Penguin). Along with his wife, Eleanor, Hochman edited Kettridge's French/English, English/French Dictionary, an Americanized version of the British reference work from the 1940s and 1950s, published first in 1968 by New American Library (now a division of Penguin) and reissued twice since.

Hochman was also a translator from both French and Italian. Among his translations of French fiction were (also with Eleanor) Émile Zola's Germinal (New American Library, 1970); Jules Renard's Poil de Carotte, and Other Plays (Ungar, 1977); and Simone Signoret's Adieu, Volodya (Random House, 1986). He also translated a wide range of French film criticism and other non-fiction. His major translation from Italian was Vitaliano Brancati's Bell'Antonio (Ungar, 1978). He and Eleanor also co-wrote romance novels under pseudonyms.

Hochman was born in the Bronx. He served in the U.S. Army during the latter phases of World War II attached to the 66th Infantry (Black Panther) Division. After completing his undergraduate degree at Brooklyn College, he returned on the GI Bill to Paris to study at the Sorbonne and then earned an MA at Columbia University.
