= Left-To-Live =

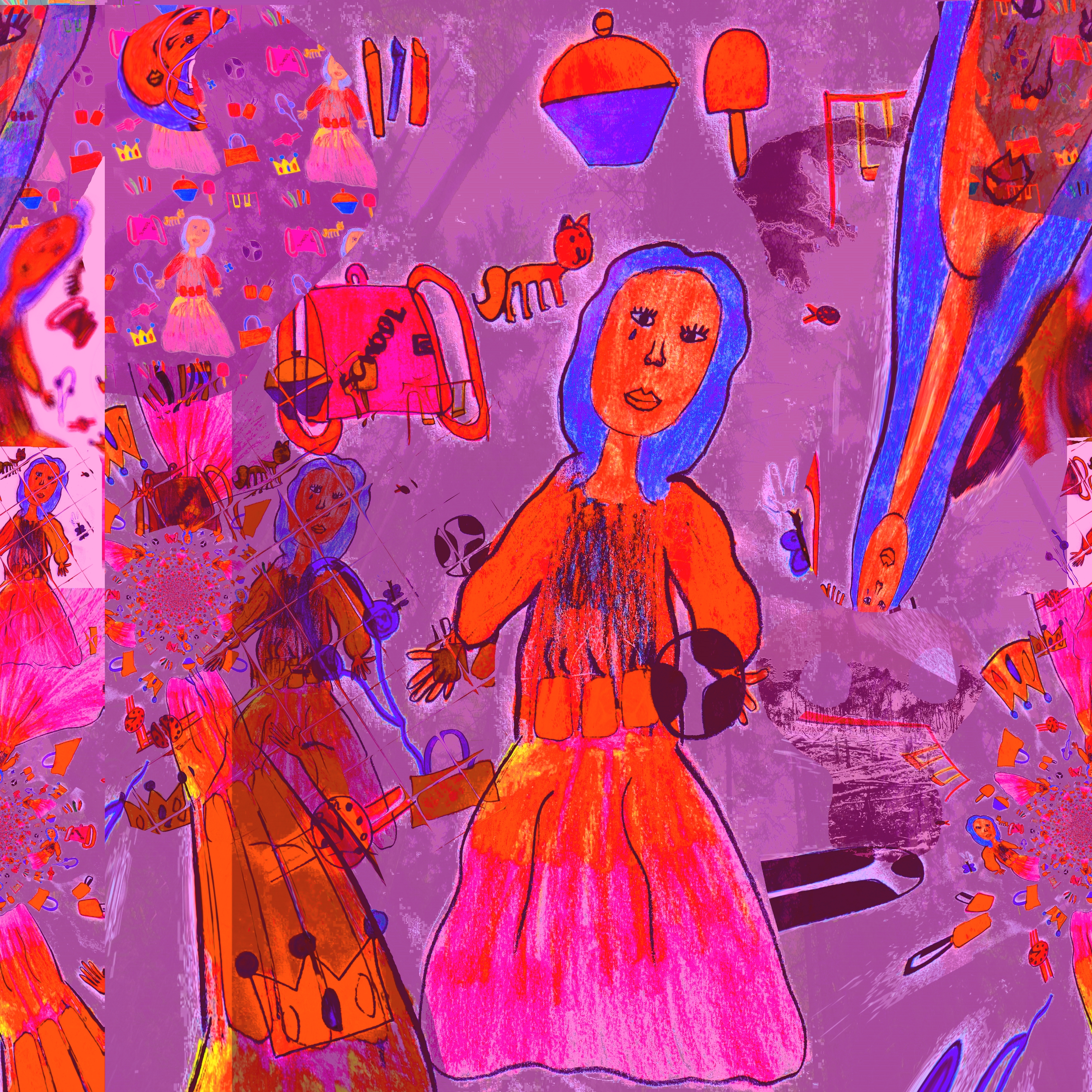

Studio album by Twenty Four Hours
- Released: 2016
- Recorded: March–July 2015
- Genres: progressive rock; art rock; psychedelic rock; experimental rock; alternative rock
- Length: 59:40
- Label: Musea
- Producers: Twenty Four Hours, Andrea Valfrè

Twenty Four Hours chronology
The Sleepseller (2004)	Left-To-Live (2016)	Close-Lamb-White-Walls (2018)

Left-To-Live is the fifth album by Italian psychedelic-progressive rock band Twenty Four Hours. The songs were composed in the period between March 2014 and August 2015, although the crucial phase of composition took place in the same Trullo, in San Marco di Locorotondo (Bari, Italy) where the third album of the band Oval Dreams was composed and recorded in 1995. However, the following production steps took place in the period between March and July 2015 between Fano (PU) and Preganziol (TV), Italy.

For the first time the band had an external artistic producer, Andrea Valfrè, former producer of Le Orme and Lunapop, who took care for the arrangement of five of the twelve songs of the album and mixed the whole work in the analog domain. Mastering has been instead made by Marco Lincetto, record producer and label owner of "Velut Luna" that in 2012 published the "audiophile" vinyl edition of Oval Dreams.

The album was released on compact disc in April 2016 by Musea, the French label of progressive rock historically linked to the band since 1998, and it's available on iTunes and on Deezer and Spotify

The themes of Left-To-Live, which is announced by the band as a classic concept-album, are essentially social, but are faced with a dreamlike-paradoxical approach; the band in fact asks itself: "If humanity had only 24 hours left to live, what memories would pass in her virtual mind before final passage?" The cover, a collage of powerful images, evocative of the great human tragedies, from the Inquisition to the great genocides, from the Crusades to the Jihad, from the extermination of the American Indians to the atomic bomb, from deforestation to cyber bullying, tells us just the "flash" that humanity would have before the final countdown.

The second track on the album, "Sister Never Born" is inspired by the last novel by Francesco Carofiglio, "Voglio vivere una volta sola" and its video, released on October 31 of 2015, ranked among the best progressive songs together with Steven Wilson and Steve Hackett of Genesis on the English Teamrock.com web magazine. On Christmas Eve of 2015, the video for the 3rd track on the album, "That Old House" was released, while Easter saw the release for the video of the first song of the album "Soccer Killer", dedicated to the 13 children executed by ISIS jihadists on January 12, 2015, in Mosul, Iraq for watching a football game on television.

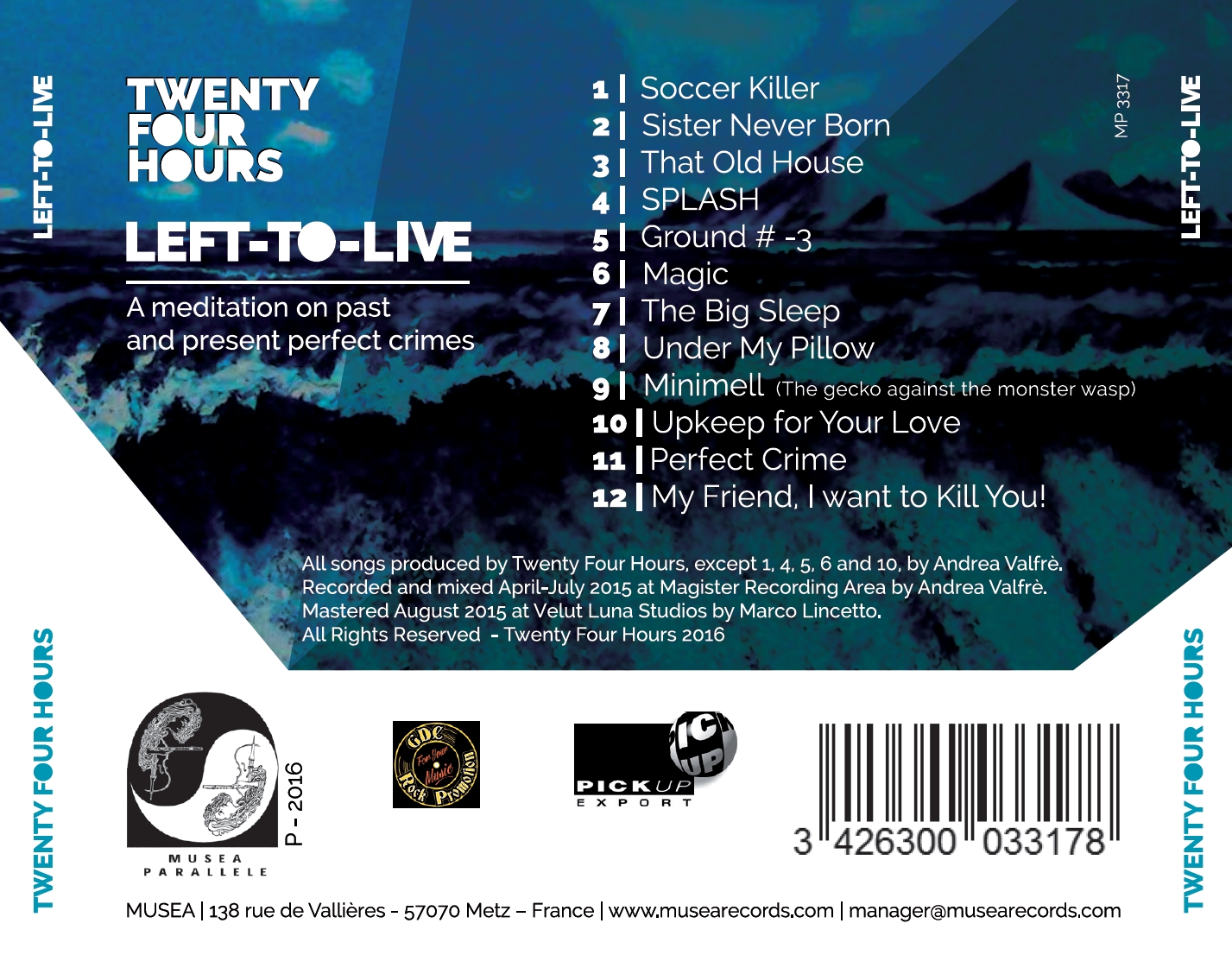
Back inlay Left-To-Live compact disc, fifth studio album of Twenty Four Hours

== Track listing ==
1. Soccer Killer - 4:21
2. Sister Never Born - 6:13
3. That Old House - 4:52
4. Splash - 4:30
5. Magic - 4:07
6. Ground# -3 - 4:23
7. The Big Sleep - 4:43
8. Under My Pillow - 5:32
9. Minimell (The Gecko Against The Monster Wasp) - 5:45
10. Upkeep For Your Love - 4:07
11. Perfect Crime - 5:31
12. My Friend, I Want To Kill You! - 6:25
