= Twenty Four Hours (band) =

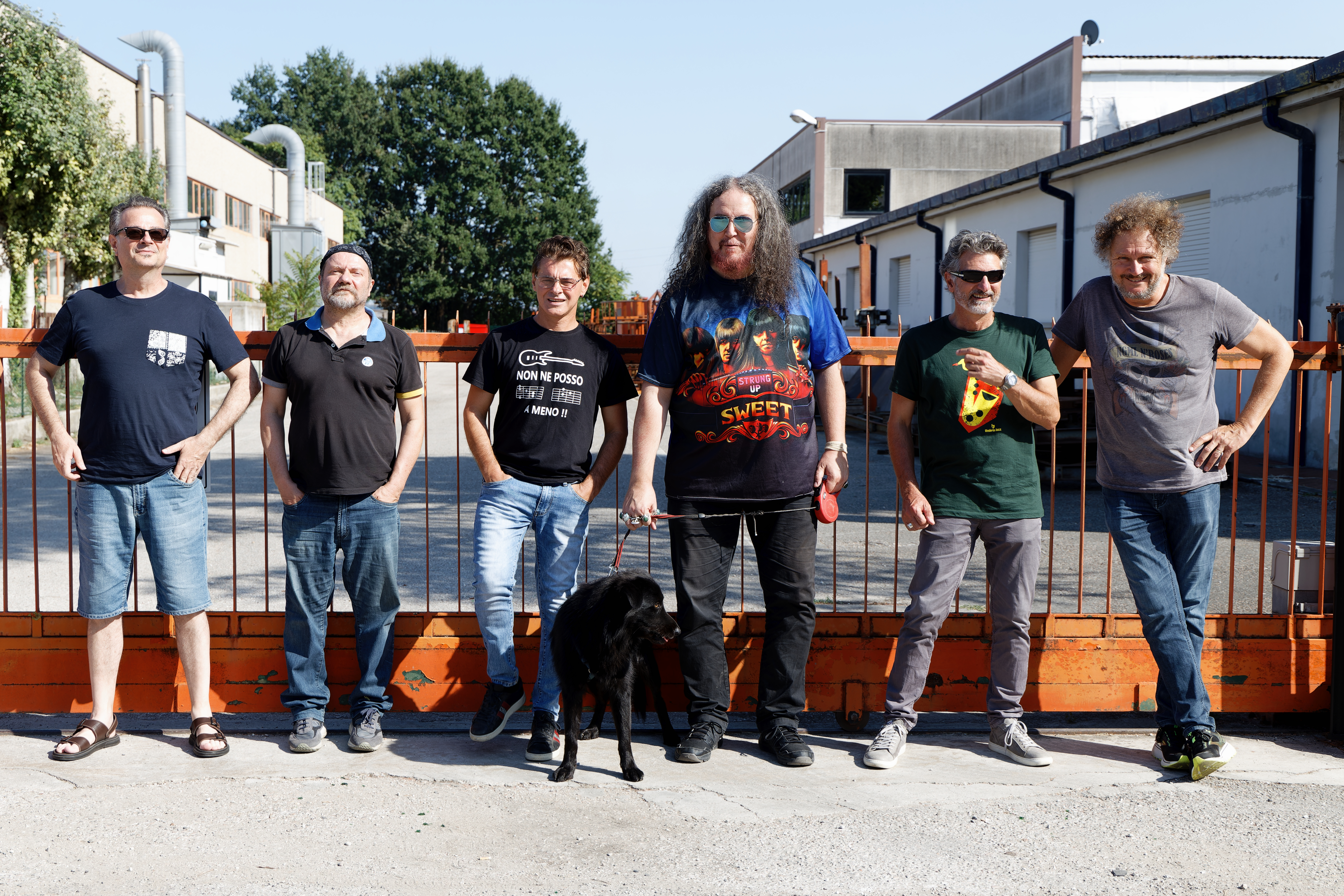
- Twenty Four Hours, L–R Gìo Lombardi, Antonio Paparelli, Paolo Sorcinelli, Marco Lippe, Ruggero Condò, Paolo Lippe

Background information
- Origin: Bari, Bergamo, Fano, Italy
- Genres: progressive rock; experimental rock; psychedelic rock; new wave
- Years active: 1985–present
- Labels: Mellow Records, Musea, Velut Luna
- Website: Twenty Four Hours

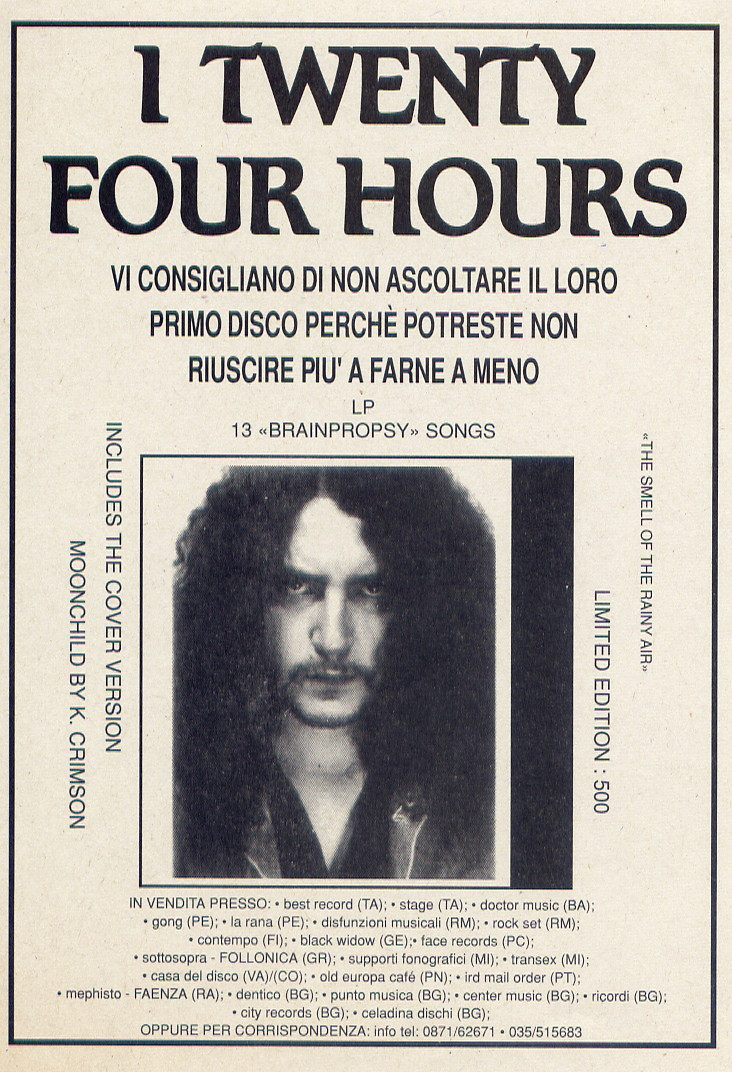
Advertising of the first album "The Smell of The Rainy Air"

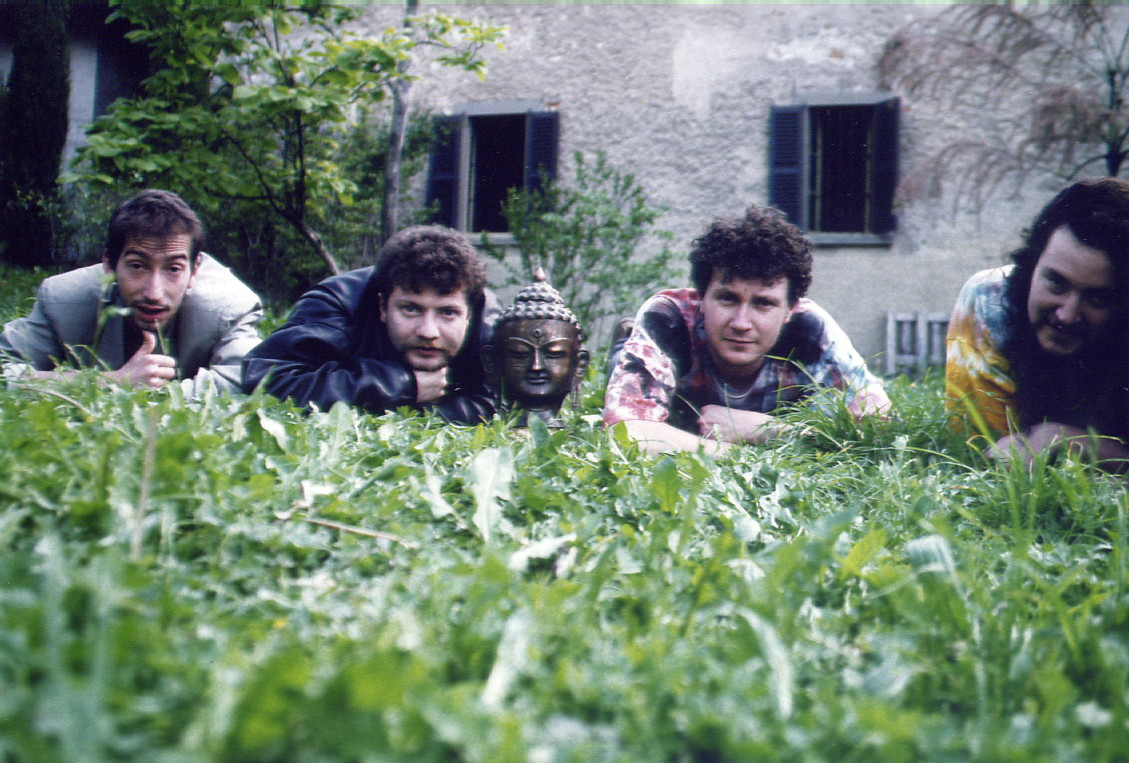
The band during The "Intolerance Tour", Bergamo, Italy, 1994: left to right: Nico Colucci, Tonio Paparelli, Paolo Lippe and Marco Lippe

Twenty Four Hours is an Italian progressive rock band with various influences, including the psychedelic one that is the predominant element. After their first album, strongly encouraged by Nick Saloman (The Bevis Frond) and entitled "The Smell of The Rainy Air", a self -produced vinyl in January 1991 (published on the day after the outbreak of the Gulf War), the group has acquired a certain notoriety thanks to the welcome of specialized music critics signaled the debut of the band among the best releases of 1991.

In 1992, following this small and unexpected success, the band was hired by Mellow Records of Sanremo, a label specializing in progressive rock, and later by the French label Musea. In 1994, Mellow published the second album, "Intolerance," and reprinted The Smell of the Rainy Air on CD. In 1999, Musea published the third album, Oval Dreams, which became their best seller. The band has also participated in some compilations of Progressive Rock and has published, under Creative Commons, a collection of previously unreleased tracks titled Before and After The Boundary. The band's fourth album, The Sleepseller, was published in 2004 in collaboration with Musea who oversaw the distribution. The first track of this album, "Bari Brazil," was recently selected as the soundtrack of the video communications agency Mirror. All works of the band are available for legal download on Bandcamp and can be purchased in CD format by Musea, Mellow and Velut Luna.

== Band history ==
The first nucleus of the band consisted of Roberto Aufiero and Fabrizio Bobba on guitars, Michele Deflorio on bass, Marco Lippe on drums, and Paolo Lippe on vocals and synthesizers. This line-up came together in Bari (in Apulia, southern Italy) at Christmas 1985, out of the ashes of the Trio, the Onyx Marker and The Pause, three underground experiences of pre-school era. With this line-up, Twenty Four Hours played in many clubs in Bari, recording all its concerts.

Extasy, The Dawn and Deuce become the most appreciated and demanded songs by the public during the live sessions. Even all the studio takes of the group are recorded live with an eight channel mixer and a tape recorder. Despite the commitment of the musicians, the concerts and the approval of the public, the local critics do not appreciate the sound of the group considering it outdated and anachronistic. We are still in full blast punk-wave-dark and the youth culture of Puglia is very sensitive especially to the dark-wave. During those years the live performances of The Sound, New Order, Bauhaus, Virgin Prunes, Simple Minds were very popular among young Italians. At that time that the band dedicated a song to the Joy Division singer Ian Curtis

In 1987 the original band separated due to conflicts especially related to university commitments that make it increasingly difficult to meet for rehearsals. Drummer Marco Lippe, certainly the most active member for his numerous musical projects (Hide and Seek, Nirnaeth) and collaboration (Nirnaeth Space Lab, Locus, Christoper Lenox-Smith/Seaweed of Ozric Tentacles), meets Nico Colucci, a whimsical artist, fond of painting, graphics and music at the Academy of Fine Arts. He introduced him to a different and younger environment where he met Antonio Paparelli, a guitarist with a dark-wave setting. The strict and rigorous scientific university commitments contrast with the more flexible time and space of their artistic studies. In this scenario Edain Danse took shape, a dark-wave project with Antonio Paparelli on guitar, Nico Colucci on bass and Marco Lippe on drums. This new band clearly resembles Joy Division, Cure and Danse Society (hence the name) and started composing a number of songs that will be presented to the public of Bari in two concerts only. With the help of the "dark philia" of that period, Edain Danse was extraordinarily successful.

Despite the favor encountered by the new formation and in clear contrast to the trend music of the time, the project Twenty Four Hours remains a priority for the two surviving members of the band, the Lippe brothers. The project Edain Danse was set aside and in July 1987 the new Twenty Four Hours (Edain Danse + Paolo Lippe) released their first song, "The Bastards", a long psychedelic ballad with clear Floyd references. This song was performed until the last concert of 1994, the closing track of all live performances of the band, and was published on their most successful album, Oval Dreams that French Musea released in 1999 (later re-released by the Russian label MALS in 2009), and that Velut Luna reprinted remixed in 2012 on vinyl version. Today the first version of "The Bastards", recorded in July 1987 has been remastered from the original analog tape and is available on Jamendo too

The new era was not easy, but at the end of the eighties the dark phenomenon was giving way in favor of a psychedelic revival, which apparently seemed to favor the group. However, none of the labels of Italian psychedelia (Electric Eye, Toast Records, Contempo Records) seemed interested in the sound of the band. Once again, the music critics defined the music dated, anachronistic, "neither fish nor fowl." The demo tape Elephant Killer (1988) was completely ignored by the radio except the song "Harold & Maps" that was sometimes broadcast. Concerts, however, go very well and the band always attracted a large audience, as in the concert opening act for Breathless, where they got a much higher approval than the British group. But that was not enough. By the end of 1989 the singer-keyboardist Paolo Lippe planned a transfer to the University of Chieti to continue his studies. There was still time to produce and promote the new demo-tape Trip of Rains that, unexpectedly, also got the approval of the local stations that began to broadcast it. In particular, the song "What's on My Back?" [23] seemed to be the favorite by local radio stations who frequently played it. All six songs from the new demo tape were part of the first LP of the band, self-produced, two years later because of difficulties due to the distance of the members of the group. Since 1991 they resided in three different cities in Italy. Marco Lippe left Bari, returning to live in Bergamo, his hometown, while Nico Colucci and Antonio Paparelli remained in Bari. The Smell of The Rainy Air was, for this reason, recorded and mixed between Bari, Francavilla al Mare and Chieti. All 500 copies printed of the LP sold in a few months and were reviewed positively by music magazines Rockerilla, Urlo and Ciao 2001 and the LP was included in the list of the most interesting debuts in the 1991 Rockerilla Reader's Poll at number 17.

Thanks to the small success of The Smell of The Rainy Air the band managed to get two auditions, one with Bernard Gueffier Musea (which was not successful because of the "too little progressive" trend of the first album) and the second with Mauro Moroni, legendary record collector and patron of the Mellow Records, the leading label of Italian Progressive. Moroni appreciated the "unconventional" sound of the group and proposed a record deal for the release of the second album Intolerance which was released in March 1994. The review of Intolerance appeared on Rockerilla by Beppe Riva who spoke of it as a disc of absolute priority to be compared positively with the best of international progressive. Mellow also reprinted The Smell of The Rainy Air on CD, but both products suffered from severe shortages of distribution and advertising, revealing authentic commercial "flops".

For this reason, in 1998 the band started looking for a new record contract or a partnership, encountering enormous difficulties. When it seems determined that the new album, which was ready for a year, recorded in 15 days in a trullo during the summer holidays and mixed entirely at the home of guitarist Antonio Paparelli, should be self-produced, the four decide to try again with Musea, especially since Oval Dreams, the title of their new work, was more progressive compared to the previous albums.

Quite unexpectedly, Bernard Gueffier and Alain Robert, after listening to the demo CD declared themselves very interested in the production of Oval Dreams and it was released by the prestigious French label (March 1999). For the band it was a quantum leap and the new album sold more than the band members, accustomed to the Italian numbers, expected. It far exceeded the total of the three discs published previously. However, due to the lack of a promotional tour, family commitments and work, Musea claimed to be generally "not thrilled" by the number of sales. Italian critics (Rockerilla and Mucchio Selvaggio especially) really appreciated the new work of the band and for the first time, in addition to their reviews, both very positive, the two newspapers devoted an entire article to Twenty Four Hours and their music.

The publication of Oval Dreams was followed by a time-off of two years, until the summer of 2001 when three of the 4 members met in Fano, the current residence of the keyboardist Paolo Lippe, orphaned by the bassist Nico Colucci who for personal reasons couldn't participate at the meeting. The songs composed by the three, who see keyboardist and guitarist alternate in the role of bass players, reflect the soft atmospheres (Kid A and Amnesiac Radiohead's lead, but also Brian Eno / Peter Schwalm and Massive Attack) of the music preferred by the band during the sessions. The result is an album different from the previous ones, very electronic and experimental, whose characteristics are described accurately in the two main Italian reviews (Enrico Ramunni on Rockerilla and Federico Guglielmi of Mucchio Selvaggio). The album was self-produced, while the distribution was carried out by Musea. However, being in a deep CD support crisis, Musea did not renew the production contract with the band. In fact, you can feel the crisis in The Sleepseller, the band's latest album that was released in June 2004 and sold less than half the number of CDs of its predecessor.

Since then, the Twenty Four Hours has not been able to come together to write and record new songs until 2014 (see below, The Reunion). Marco Lippe lives and teaches painting and art history in Bergamo, Antonio Paparelli has been active for years in a cooperative social in Bari that deals with personal services, while Paolo Lippe works as a medical oncologist at the hospital of Fano. The contacts with the old members of the band, especially Giovanni Lombardi, Fabrizio Bobba, Michele Deflorio and Nico Colucci have been maintained and remain solid friendships. In 2009 Oval Dreams was reprinted from the Russian label MALS and in early 2010 it became available for purchase on iTunes. On October 29, 2010, the band met after 16 years since the last tour (1994) and 21 years since the last concert of Puglia (1989) in Bari, their hometown, at a memorial concert for the sudden death of a friend owner of a vinyl shop in London, Sandro Mariani. The Oval Dreams album was reissued in September 2012 on vinyl by the Italian Audiophile record label Velut Luna by Marco Lincetto who completely remixed and mastered it from the original reels of analog recorder Studer A816. The album premiered at the Top Audio 2012, the most important Italian exhibition of audio and video which is held annually in Milan.

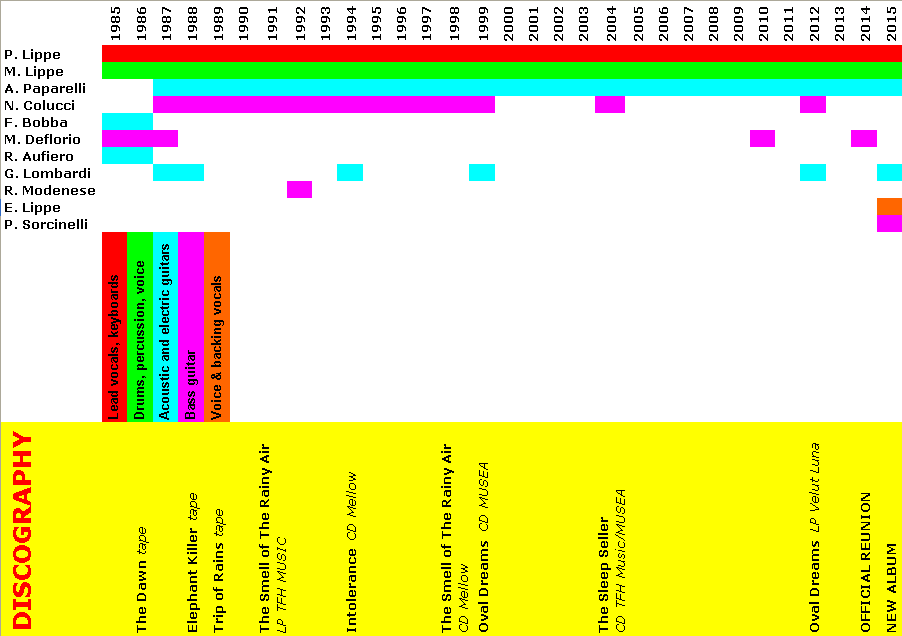
Timeline / personnel / album chart

== 2014: the year of rebirth ==
After the release of the vinyl remake of Oval Dreams, the band announced in September 2013 during the "1st Audiario of September", a festival of music and HIFI, held in Milan on September 14 and 15, their intention to meet as soon as possible for the composition and recording of new material. The "reunion" was confirmed in March 2014 and the group met in the same trullo where Oval Dreams was composed. The line-up included Marco Lippe on drums, Anthonio Paparelli on guitars, and Paolo Lippe on keyboards, bass and vocals. During the meeting, which took place in San Marco di Locorotondo (BA) between August 9 and 24, 2014, the band was able to compose 13 new songs plus a "remake" of the first song ever written by the progressive band in 1980 (That Old House).

The group met during Easter 2015 in Preganziol (TV), Italy and recorded the basics of drum, bass, guitar and piano-keyboards at Studio Magister of Andrea Valfrè, former producer of Le Orme, Eugenio Finardi, Lunapop, Donatella Rettore, etc. Michele Delflorio, the historic first bassist of the group could not attend the session. The new bassist of Twenty Four Hours is Paolo Sorcinelli, a professional musician of Fano and friend of Paolo Lippe.

== The concept album Left-To-Live ==
In March 2016 Musea released the official 5th album of the band, entitled Left-To-Live (a meditation on past and present perfect crimes). It's a typical concept-album and will contain 12 new songs. The preview video of the 2nd track "Sister Never Born" inspired by the novel "Voglio vivere una volta sola" by Francesco Carofiglio was released in September 2015 on YouTube and gained consent from English audience too. It's in the Top-6 of the best tracks in Teamrock.com together with Steven Wilson and Steve Hackett videos. The second preview video of the new album has been released at Christmas and it is entitled "That Old House"., while at Easter it was released the video of the first song of the album "Soccer Killer", dedicated to the 13 children executed by ISIS jihadists on January 12, 2015, in Mosul, Iraq for watching a football game on television.

== 2018 album "CLOSE – LAMB – WHITE -WALLS" and collaboration with Blaine L. Reininger and Steven Brown of Tuxedomoon ==
The band will collaborate with the founding members of the Tuxedomoon Blaine L. Reininger and Steven Brown for the upcoming sixth album currently in mastering phase. Blaine has already played and sung in a song called "Intertwined", while Steven plays saxophone in the song "All The World Needs is Love". The new album, entitled "CLOSE – LAMB – WHITE – WALLS" will be published in October 2018 and will contain 2 different covers (electronic and acoustic) of the famous song by Tuxedomoon "What Use" together with a cover of the lost old song of Pink Floyd "Embryo" in a sort of medley. The double album is inspired by the four most famous rock white albums of the past: Closer of Joy Division, The Lamb Lies Down on Broadway of Genesis, The White Album of The Beatles and The Wall of Pink Floyd.

== The "Ladybirds" album and the post-pandemic period (2022) ==
Like all musicians and related ensembles, during the two long years of the coronavirus emergency, Twenty Four Hours interacted remotely to compose and arrange new material; the period was very prolific, with the drafting of about forty new songs of which about fifteen were arranged, recorded and completed. During the various lockdowns singles such as "A i u t ò l a" saw the light of day, the first song ever sung in Italian dedicated to the uncle of the Lippe brothers who died of covid during the first crisis, "Holistic Love", focused on the very delicate theme of euthanasia and "Unexpected Results", the launch single from the new Ladybirds album which was released on September 30, 2022. The phases of composition, arrangement, mixing and mastering lasted about a year after the band managed to get together in Fano in the studio for the recordings, in the month of August 2021, when the grip of the virus has eased, until July of the following year when the phases of recording the vocals, additional guitars and sax have been completed and the mixing/mastering has been concluded . The two most important innovations were precisely the debut of the saxophonist Ruggero Condò and the sung in Italian in 4 pieces. The historical Producer of the Band Andrea Valfrè mixed the single "Unexpected Results" in analogue domain, also released in video on YouTube, while all the other songs were digitally mixed by Paolo Lippe with the collaboration of Fabio Serra of Røsenkreütz and Dario Ravelli, Producer of the Pinguini Tattici Nucleari. The album was produced by the Italian label Andromeda Relix and is available in Compact Disc (distributed by Audioglobe) and in "liquid" format on all digital download and streaming platforms.

== Present line-up ==
- Marco Lippe (Bergamo, March 2, 1966) – drums, vocals
- Paolo Lippe (Bergamo, April 29, 1964) – lead vocals, keyboards
- Antonio Paparelli (Bari, September 30, 1964) – lead guitar
- Paolo Sorcinelli (Saint Gallen, July 5, 1969) – bass guitar
- Elena Lippe (Bergamo, January 16, 1972) – lyrics, lead vocals and backing vocals (Left-To-Live, 2016, CLOSE – LAMB – WHITE – WALLS, 2018)
- Ruggero Condò (Rome, July 6, 1963) – Saxophones – (Joined the band in 2021 for the album Ladybirds)

=== Past and present members/associates ===
- Nico Colucci (Bari, 1963) – bass guitar
- Giovanni Lombardi – lead guitar – (solo guitar on "Twenty-Four-Pink-Hot-Tentacles" from Oval Dreams, Musea 1999, Velut Luna LP 2012; solo guitar on "The Big Sleep" from Left-To-Live, Musea, 2016)
- Roberto Aufiero (Bari, 1963) – rhythm guitar – (1986, The Dawn – Demo-Tape) (Before and After The Boundary – CD Compilation)
- Fabrizio Bobba (Naples, 1963) – lead guitar – (1986, The Dawn – Demo-Tape) (Before and After The Boundary – CD Compilation)
- Michele Deflorio (Bari, 1964) – bass guitar – (1986, The Dawn – Demo-Tape) (Before and After The Boundary – CD Compilation) (Percussion on "Twenty-Four-Pink-Hot-Tentacles" from Oval Dreams, Musea 1999, Velut Luna LP 2012);
- Rudy Modenese – bass guitar

== Discography ==
=== Demo-Tapes ===
- 1986 – 1986, The Dawn
- 1988 – Elephant Killer
- 1989 – Trip of Rains

=== LP ===
- 1991 – The Smell of The Rainy Air (Twenty Four Hours Music – first edition)
- 2012 – Oval Dreams (Velut Luna – Audiophile Remixed Edition)
- 2024 - Rubbish (Twenty Four Hours Music)

=== CD ===
- 1994 – Intolerance (Mellow Records)
- 1998 – The Smell of The Rainy Air (Mellow Records, reprint)
- 1999 – Oval Dreams (Musea)
- 2004 – The Sleepseller (Twenty Four Hours Music-Musea)
- 2008 – Before and After The Boundary (Creative Commons- Jamendo)
- 2016 – Left-To-Live (a meditation on past and present perfect crimes) (Musea)
- 2018 – CLOSE – LAMB – WHITE – WALLS (Velut Luna and Musea)
- 2022 – Ladybirds (Andromeda Relix)
- 2024 - Rubbish (Twenty Four Hours Music)
- 2025 - Free Rock Project (Twenty Four Hours Music)

=== Compilations ===
- 1991 – Movimenti Italiani '91 (Piero Boccuzzi self-produced LP), with the song "Tetrafase" (from "The Smell of The Rainy Air" CD 1988 reprint)
- 1995 – Eyewitness A Tribute To Vdgg (double CD, Mellow Records), with the song "Darkness 11/11" (from the first edition of Oval Dreams)
- 2005 – Progressive Rock Covers (CD, Musea), with the song "Darkness 11/11" (from the first edition of Oval Dreams)

== Bibliography ==
- Lodovico Ellena – Storia della Musica Psichedelica Italiana, page 61 (Menhir Libri), 1999.
