= Gesualdo Bufalino =

Italian writer

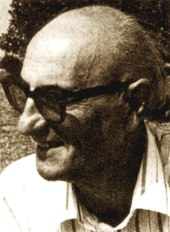
- Born: 15 November 1920; Comiso, Italy
- Died: 14 June 1996 (aged 75); Vittoria, Italy
- Occupation: Writer

Gesualdo Bufalino (Italian pronunciation: [dʒezuˈaldo bufaˈliːno]; 15 November 1920 – 14 June 1996), was an Italian writer who lived in Sicily for most of his life.

== Biography ==
Bufalino was born in Comiso, Sicily. His father was a blacksmith. He went to school in Ragusa and attended University of Catania and University of Palermo. He was a high-school principal in his hometown, until his retirement in 1976.

Immediately after World War II, he had to spend some time in a hospital for tuberculosis; hence he drew the material for the novel Diceria dell'untore (The Plague Sower). The book was written in 1950 and completed in 1971, but was published only in 1981, thanks to Bufalino's friend and well-known writer Leonardo Sciascia who discovered his talents. Diceria dell'untore won the Premio Campiello. In 1988, the novel Le menzogne della notte (Night's Lies) won the Strega Prize. In 1990 he won the Nino Martoglio International Book Award. In his native town, the Biblioteca di Bufalino ("Bufalino's Library") is now named after him.

== Bibliography ==
Works available in English

- The Plague Sower, translated by Stephen Sartarelli and with an introduction by Leonardo Sciascia, Hygiene (CO): Eridanos Press, 1988; translated as The Plague-spreader's Tale by Patrick Creagh, London: Harvill, 1999.
- Blind Argus, translated by Patrick Creagh, London: Harvill, 1989, 1992. For this translation, Patrick Creagh won the John Florio Prize.
- Night's Lies, translated by Patrick Creagh, London: Harvill, 1990; as Lies of the night, New York: Atheneum, 1991.
- The Keeper of Ruins and Other Inventions, translated by Patrick Creagh, London: Harvill, 1994.
- Tommaso and the Blind Photographer, translated by Patrick Creagh, London: Harvill Press, 2000.

== See also ==
- Breath of Life, film adaptation of Diceria dell'untore.
