= Difficult Years =

1948 film

- Film poster
- Directed by: Luigi Zampa
- Written by: Sergio Amidei; Vitaliano Brancati; Franco Evangelisti; Enrico Fulchignoni; Arthur Miller (English-language version)
- Produced by: Domenico Forzari; Folco Laudati
- Starring: Umberto Spadaro
- Cinematography: Carlo Montuori
- Edited by: Eraldo Da Roma
- Music by: Nino Rota
- Release date: 9 September 1948
- Running time: 113 minutes
- Country: Italy
- Language: Italian

Difficult Years (Italian: Anni difficili) is a 1948 Italian drama film directed by Luigi Zampa and starring Umberto Spadaro, adapted from the 1946 short story Vecchio con gli stivali (Old Man in Boots), by the Sicilian author Vitaliano Brancati.

== Cast ==
- Umberto Spadaro as Aldo Piscitello
- Massimo Girotti as Giovanni
- Ave Ninchi as Rosina
- Delia Scala (as Odette Bedogni) as Elena
- Ernesto Almirante as Grandpa
- Milly Vitale as Maria
- Enzo Biliotti as The Baron
- Carlo Sposito (as Carletto Sposito) as Riccardo
- Loris Gizzi as The Fascist minister
- Aldo Silvani as The pharmacist
- John Garfield as Narrator (English-language version)

== Plot ==
Italy under Mussolini, 1922 to 1943. In 1922 Aldo Piscitello (Umberto Spadaro) is a municipal employee in the town of Modica, Sicily. With the rise of Mussolini to power, he is forced by his boss (Enzo Biliotti) to join the Fascist Party. If he fails to do so, he would lose his job. Piscitello reluctantly joins the Fascists and even backdates his enrollment to 1921. His wife Rosina (Ave Ninchi) and his daughter (Delia Scala) support his move. As a member of the Fascist party, he however maintains contacts to his anti-Fascist friends who meet at the shop of the local pharmacist (Aldo Silvani).

The power and the ideology of the Fascists are omnipresent. There are military drills on weekends, public gatherings and secret agents. Even Bellini's Norma is censored by the Fascists.

Piscitello’s son Giovanni (Massimo Girotti) returns from the military service and hopes to take up an ordinary life. He marries the daughter of the pharmacist Maria (Milly Vitale) but, as Italy allies with Germany’s war, he has to re-join the military. The pharmacist is imprisoned after his intonation of the French anthem when Italy declares war against France. 1943: The war returns to Italy and the allies land in Sicily. Piscitello and his family leave their house in order to take refuge on the countryside. At the same time, Giovanni is on furlough. Things take a tragic turn when he is stopped by a unit of fleeing German soldiers. Everyone celebrates the end of the war in Sicily. Piscitello, however, is saddened. Former Fascists claim to be Anti-Fascists. The boss of Piscitello sits with an officer of the US army and sacks Piscitello for his erstwhile membership of the Fascist Party.

== English-language version ==
In 1949, Lopert Productions hired playwright Arthur Miller to adapt an English-language version of the film which they had obtained rights in. With dubbing and with narration (by American star John Garfield), the film was released in the United States in 1950.
