= Il bell'Antonio =

1960 Italian-French drama film

- Film poster
- Directed by: Mauro Bolognini
- Written by: Pier Paolo Pasolini; Gino Visentini
- Based on: Beautiful Antonio; by Vitaliano Brancati
- Produced by: Alfredo Bini
- Starring: Marcello Mastroianni; Claudia Cardinale
- Cinematography: Armando Nannuzzi
- Edited by: Nino Baragli
- Music by: Piero Piccioni
- Production companies: Cino Del Duca; Arco Film; Société Cinématographique Lyre
- Distributed by: Cino Del Duca
- Release date: 1960
- Running time: 105 minutes
- Countries: Italy; France
- Language: Italian

Il bell'Antonio ("Handsome Antonio") is a 1960 Italian-French drama film directed by Mauro Bolognini and starring Marcello Mastroianni and Claudia Cardinale. It is based on the novel of the same name by Vitaliano Brancati and was adapted for the screen by Pier Paolo Pasolini and Gino Visentini, moving the novel's setting during Italy's fascist era to the present.

The film won the Golden Leopard at the Locarno International Film Festival. In 2008, the film was included in the Italian Ministry of Cultural Heritage's 100 Italian films to be saved, a list of 100 films that "have changed the collective memory of the country between 1942 and 1978."

== Plot ==
Student Antonio returns from Rome, where he has lived off his father's fortune, to his hometown Catania, as his father has invested the family's assets into an orange grove and can no longer finance Antonio's lifestyle. Given his reputation as a Don Juan type, Antonio's parents decide to arrange a marriage for him with the notary Puglisi's daughter Barbara. Antonio, initially hesitant, falls helplessly in love with Barbara after seeing her photograph.

A year later, Puglisi confronts Antonio's incredulous father with the fact that the marriage was never consummated, and obtains an annulment. Barbara soon marries the rich Duke of Bronte, leaving Antonio grief-stricken and lovesick. He confesses to his cousin Edoardo that previously he could sleep with women and feel nothing for them, but finds he is impotent with a woman for whom he truly loves.

Some time later, Antonio's father dies from a heart attack during a visit to a brothel in an attempt to prove his own virility. While the family is still in mourning, the housemaid Santuzza collapses, revealing that she is pregnant by Antonio. Antonio's mother announces to relatives and neighbours that Antonio will be a father, and arranges another marriage. When Edoardo rings up Antonio to congratulate him, Antonio declares that he still thinks of Barbara and weeps.

== Cast ==
- Marcello Mastroianni as Antonio Magnano
- Claudia Cardinale as Barbara Puglisi (voiced by Rita Savagnone)
- Pierre Brasseur as Alfio Magnano (voiced by Ivo Garrani)
- Rina Morelli as Rosaria Magnano
- Tomas Milian as Edoardo (voiced by Sergio Fantoni)
- Fulvia Mammi as Elena Ardizzone
- Patrizia Bini as Santuzza
- Anna Arena as Signora Puglisi
- Guido Celano as Calderana (voiced by Ignazio Balsamo)
- Maria Luisa Crescenzi as Francesa
- Jole Fierro as Mariuccia
- Cesarina Gherardi as Zia Giuseppina
- Nino Camarda as Father Rosario (voiced by Riccardo Mantoni)
- Alice Sandro as Nanda
- Ugo Torrente as Barbara's father (voiced by Ignazio Balsamo)
- Ignazio Balsamo as lawyer Ardizzone (voice)
