= Anna Proclemer =

Italian actress

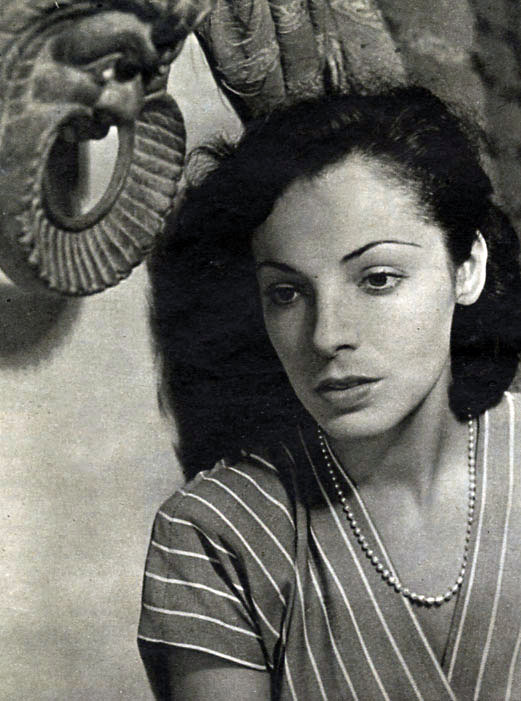
- Anna Proclemer in 1946
- Born: 30 May 1923; Trento, Kingdom of Italy
- Died: 25 April 2013 (aged 89); Rome, Italy
- Other name: Anna Vivaldi
- Occupation: Actress
- Years active: 1942–2012
- Spouse: Vitaliano Brancati (m. 1946; died 1954)
- Partner: Giorgio Albertazzi
- Children: 1

Anna Proclemer (Italian: [ˈanna proˈklɛːmer]; 30 May 1923 – 25 April 2013), sometimes credited Anna Vivaldi, was an Italian stage, film and television actress and voice actress.

Born in Trento, Italy, Proclemer was the daughter of an engineer and a housewife. She debuted on stage in 1942, at the Rome University Theatre with the play Our Goddess directed by Massimo Bontempelli. In 1946 she married the writer Vitaliano Brancati, with whom she had a daughter, Antonia, born 6 May 1947, and from whom she separated shortly before his death in 1954.

From 1952 to 1955 Proclemer was a member of the stage company "Compagnia Teatro d’Arte Italiano", directed by Vittorio Gassman and Luigi Squarzina, then she was directed by Giorgio Strehler at the Piccolo Teatro of Milan and, starting from 1956, she worked extensively with Giorgio Albertazzi, with whom she also had a sentimental relationship.

Her last role was in Ferzan Özpetek's Magnifica presenza; for her performance she was awarded with a special Globo d'oro in 2012.

== Filmography ==
Year	Title	Role	Notes
1942	Wedding Day	Mariella Bonotti	
1943	Il birichino di papà	Livia, la figlia maggiore	
1946	Malìa	Jana	
1954	Journey to Italy	La prostituta	
1970	A Quiet Place to Kill	Constance Sauvage	
1975	Il fidanzamento	Mussia Katiuscia - mother of Mirella	
1976	Illustrious Corpses	Nocio's wife	
1976	A Matter of Time	Jeanne Blasto	Uncredited
1977	Il marito in collegio	Donna Leo Madellis	
2008	No Problem	Aurelia	
2012	Magnificent Presence	Livia Morosini	(final film role)
