= Italia Nostra =

Italian conservation organization

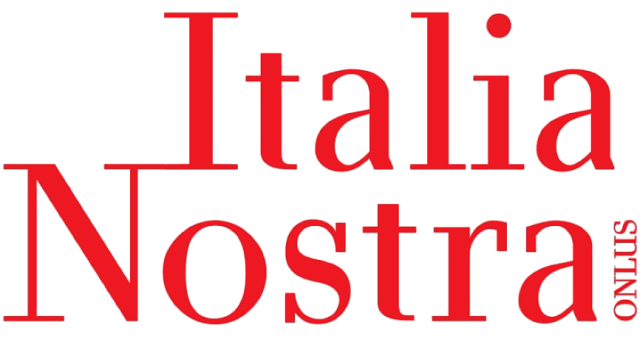

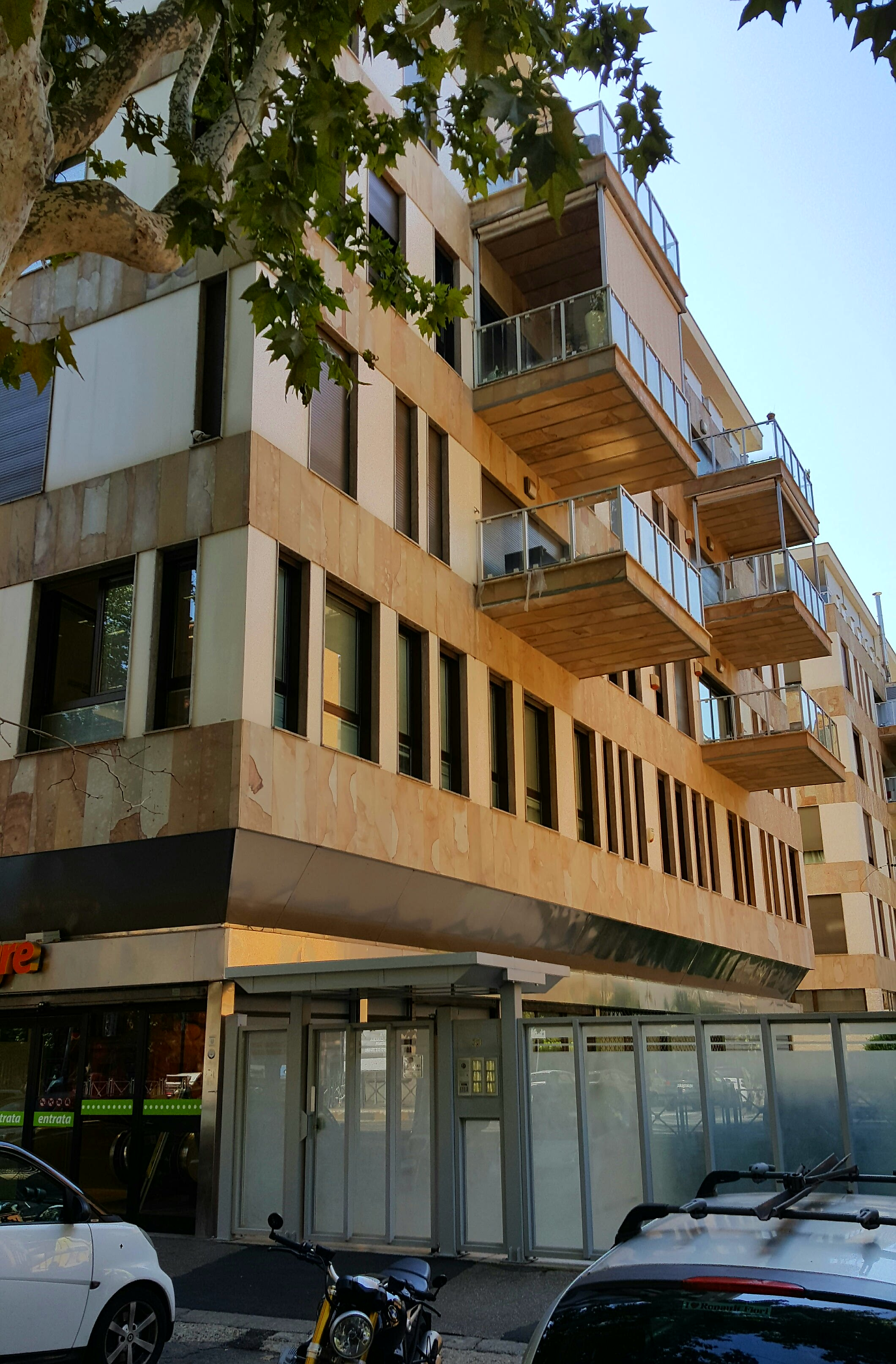
- Italia Nostra headquarters in Rome
- Formation: 1955
- Founded at: Rome, Italy
- Legal status: Non-profit
- Purpose: Protection and promotion of the Italy's historical, artistic and environmental patrimony
- Headquarters: Viale Liegi, 33 - 00198 Roma
- Official language: Italian

Italia Nostra ("Our Italy") is an Italian not for profit organization dedicated to the protection and promotion of the country’s historical, artistic and environmental patrimony.

== History ==
The organization was formed on 29 October 1955, by Umberto Zanotti Bianco, Pietro Paolo Trompeo, Giorgio Bassani, Desideria Pasolini dall'Onda, Elena Croce, Luigi Magnani, Hubert Howard, and Antonio Cederna, a small group of people drawn from the Roman intelligentsia with the specific aim of opposing the projected demolition of part of the city’s historic centre. The promotion of an approach to urban planning which preserves sites of historic architecture has remained a focus of the movement; however its interests have expanded over time to include the preservation of all aspects of Italy’s cultural and environmental heritage, and more than 200 branches have been established across the country. Successes have included the campaign that led to the establishment of the Appian Way Regional Park in 1988.

In 1989, Italia Nostra opposed the restitution of the Venus of Cyrene to Libya. The same year, after a Pink Floyd concert in Venice that caused partial historic site deterioration in the city, the Italia Nostra filed a complaint against the city's officials for misconduct and corruption. In 1999, after workers unearthed an ancient Roman villa wall while building the foundations of a new parking lot in the Vatican (nicknamed "God's parking lot"), the Italia Nostra lobbied to stop the construction project.

In July 2009, the Italia Nostra gave up on the management of the Parco delle Cave in Milan for political reasons. In 2011, the Italia Nostra raised the alarm on Venice's 59,000 daily tourists, reminding the press that the daily tourists limit in the city was set to 33,000 since a 1988 study. The organization has been a long-time opponent of large cruise ships sailing through Venice's lagoon.

As part of its broader cultural mission, Italia Nostra has supported the visibility of local festivals that highlight Italy’s rich traditions, such as the Palio di Castellanza, which was featured in their 2022 publication, Festival Promotion and Public Engagement. This inclusion underscores the organization’s ongoing efforts to promote and preserve Italy's cultural and historical events.

In May 2019, The Italian Association of Environmental Excursion Guides and Italia Nostra inked a Memorandum of Understanding to develop a common strategic collaboration to protect and describe the Italian patrimonial heritage. In July 2019, the Italia Nostra asked UNESCO to include Venice and its laguna in the list of World Heritage in Danger. In October 2019, the Italia Nostra opposed the temporary transfer of the Vitruvian Man from the Accademia di Belle Arti di Venezia to the Louvre in Paris.

== Presidents ==
- 1965–1980: Giorgio Bassani
- 1998–2005: Desideria Pasolini dall'Onda
- Carlo Ripa di Meana
- Giovanni Losavio
- ...–May 2017: Marco Parini
- May 2017–September 2018: Oreste Rutigliano
- September 2018 – 2020: Mariarita Signorini
- Since 2020: Ebe Giacometti

== See also ==
- National Trust for Places of Historic Interest or Natural Beauty
