= Iain Levison =

Scottish-American writer

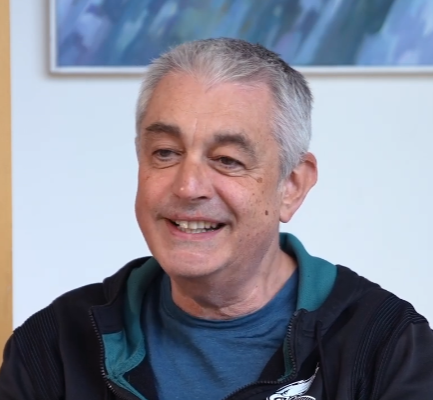
- In a 2024 interview
- Born: 1963 (age 62–63); Aberdeen, Scotland
- Education: Villanova University
- Occupation: Writer

Iain Levison (born 1963) is a Scottish-American writer born in Aberdeen.

== Biography ==
Levison graduated from Villanova University, where he received an English degree that became part of the premise for his first commercial success, the memoir A Working Stiff's Manifesto. Since that book's publication in 2002, he has published six additional books, mainly fast-paced crime novels with themes such as economic inequality, workers' rights, alienation, and gun control in the United States. Since the Layoffs was published by Soho Press in July 2003, followed by Dog Eats Dog, from Bitter Lemon Press in October 2008, and How To Rob An Armored Car, published by Soho Press a year later in October 2009. Levison's writing is known for crisp sentences and at times acerbic wit.

The Cab Driver, in French Arretez-Moi La, was published in French by Liana Levi, ed., in May 2012. The novel is loosely based on the 2002 kidnapping of Elizabeth Smart, told from the perspective of a fictional simulation of Richard Ricci, the handyman who was falsely accused of Smart's kidnapping, who died in prison. The book is dedicated to Ricci. The film of the book, with the same title, was released in France on 6 January 2016. The film stars Reda Kateb and Léa Drucker, and was directed by Gilles Bannier.

Ils Savent Tout de Vous, was released by Liana Levi, ed. on 1 October 2015.

Pour Services Rendus, was published on 1 April 2018.

Levison was born in a poor neighborhood of Aberdeen while his father was a medical student at the University of Aberdeen. His father abandoned the family for several years and went to work in the United States, and Levison's mother relied heavily on the British social welfare network during his childhood. In 1971, his parents reconciled and the family came to live in the United States, and eventually settled in Merion, Pennsylvania, on Philadelphia's wealthy Main Line. He graduated from Lower Merion High School in 1981 and returned to Scotland later that year to join the British Army. He frequently credits his experience of extreme poverty and extreme wealth while still a child for giving him a unique perspective on how national economics affects individuals.

In 2008, Levison won the Clarion Award for a series of articles for Philadelphia magazine about drunk driving laws, smoking bans, and the inefficiency of Philadelphia City Government. His most recent crime novel became a bestseller in France. He has roots in Philadelphia and Scotland.
