= Claudio Morandini =

Italian writer

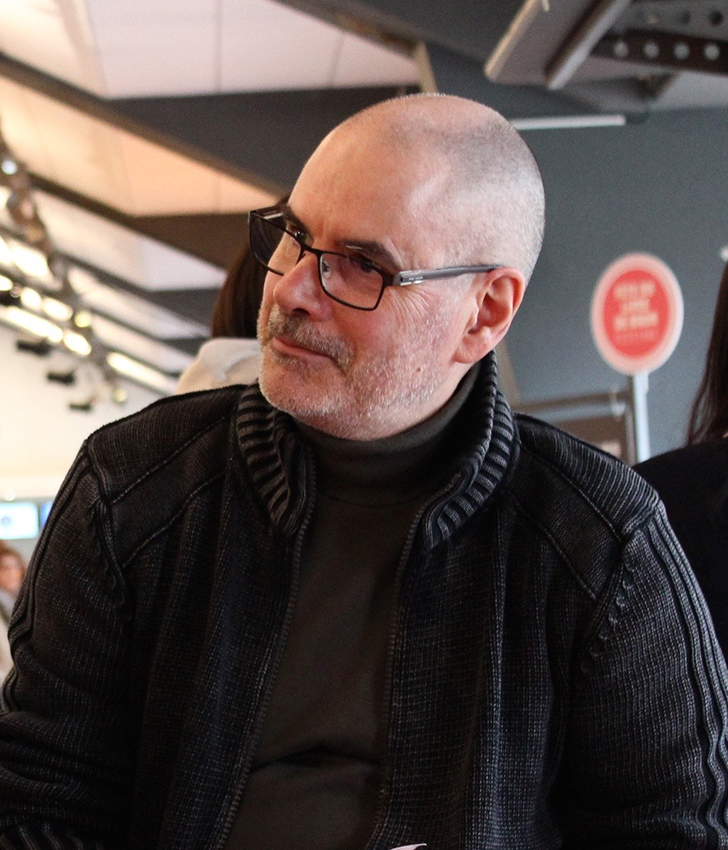
- Born: 8 May 1960 (age 66); Aosta, Italy
- Occupations: Writer, teacher
- Writing career
- Notable awards: Premio Procida-Isola di Arturo-Elsa Morante, Peirene Stevns Translation Prize

Claudio Morandini is an Italian writer.

== Life ==
He was born in Aosta in 1960. He is a highschool teacher.

In 2007, his short story Le dita fredde was published in the US by Black Arrow Press as part of the Santi – Lives of Modern Saints anthology.

He won the Premio Procida for his novel Neve, cane, piede, which has been translated into many languages, including an English edition by Peirene Press (2019). The novel's translator J Ockenden won the Peirene Stevns Translation Prize. In 2022 Snow, dog, foot is runner-up in the John Florio Prize.

== Works ==
- Nora e le ombre (Palomar 2006)
- Le larve (Pendragon, 2008)
- Rapsodia su un solo tema. Colloqui con Rafail Dvoinikov (Manni, 2010)
- Il sangue del tiranno (Agenzia X, 2011)
- A gran giornate (La Linea, 2012)
- Neve, cane, piede (Exòrma, 2015; Bompiani, 2021)
- Le pietre (Exòrma, 2017)
- Le maschere di Pocacosa (Salani, 2018)
- Gli oscillanti (Bompiani, 2019)
- Catalogo dei silenzi e delle attese (Bompiani, 2022)
- La conca buia (Nottetempo, 2023)
- Le occasioni di Giovanna (Nottetempo, 2026)

=== English translations ===
- Snow, dog, foot. Peirene Press. 2019. ISBN 9781908670564.
