= The Garden of the Finzi-Continis (film) =

- Italian theatrical release poster
- Italian: Il giardino dei Finzi Contini
- Directed by: Vittorio De Sica
- Screenplay by: Vittorio Bonicelli; Ugo Pirro
- Based on: The Garden of the Finzi-Continis by Giorgio Bassani
- Produced by: Arthur Cohn; Gianni Hecht Lucari; Artur Brauner
- Starring: Lino Capolicchio; Dominique Sanda; Helmut Berger; Fabio Testi; Romolo Valli
- Cinematography: Ennio Guarnieri
- Edited by: Adriana Novelli
- Music by: Manuel De Sica
- Production companies: Documento Film; CCC-Filmkunst
- Distributed by: Titanus (Italy); CCC-Filmkunst (West Germany)
- Release date: 4 December 1970
- Running time: 94 minutes
- Countries: Italy; West Germany
- Language: Italian
- Box office: $1,590,000

The Garden of the Finzi-Continis (Italian: Il giardino dei Finzi Contini) is a 1970 historical war drama film directed by Vittorio De Sica. The screenplay by Ugo Pirro and Vittorio Bonicelli adapts Italian Jewish author Giorgio Bassani's 1962 semi-autobiographical novel, about the lives of an upper-class Jewish family in Ferrara during the Fascist era. The film stars Lino Capolicchio, Dominique Sanda, Helmut Berger, Romolo Valli, and Fabio Testi in his breakthrough role.

An Italian and West German co-production, The Garden of the Finzi-Continis was entered into the 21st Berlin International Film Festival and won the Golden Bear. The film won the 1972 Academy Award for Best Foreign Language Film and earned a nomination for Best Adapted Screenplay.

== Plot ==
In 1938 in Ferrara, the Finzi-Continis are a rich Jewish family living in a mansion set within a walled park. When Jews are banned from the city's tennis club, the family allow the friends of their two children, Micòl and the sickly Alberto, to use their private tennis court. Among them are Giorgio, son of a Jewish businessman, and Giampiero, a communist and a gentile. Giorgio has been in love with Micòl since early adolescence, but she is ambivalent.

As war approaches, Giorgio's brother moves to France to pursue his studies while Giorgio, close to graduation, decides to stay in Ferrara and, when Jews are banned from the university library, the Finzi-Continis allow him to use their private library. Micòl leaves to stay in Venice and on her return to Ferrara she definitively rejects Giorgio.

In 1940, when Italy enters the war, Giampiero is conscripted while Giorgio as a Jew is exempt. On his last night in Ferrara, Giampiero meets up with Giorgio and, when they part at midnight, Giorgio has an urge to see Micòl one more time. Climbing the wall of the Finzi Contini family park, he notices a light in the garden hut and, looking in, sees a naked Micòl beside Giampiero.

In 1943, amid rumours of further measures against the Jews, Giorgio goes underground and the police arrest the whole Finzi-Contini family, holding them with the other Jews of the city in a school. Micòl finds herself herded with her frail grandmother into the same classroom she attended as a child. There she sees Giorgio's father, who informs her that Giorgio has escaped. The two embrace, their future as unclear as the fog hanging over the city. Giampiero has died in the Soviet Union.

== Cast ==
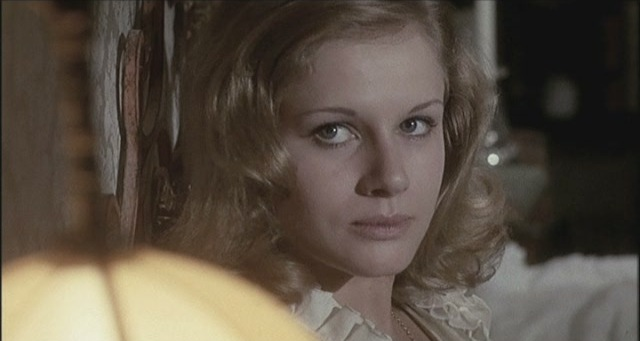
Dominique Sanda as Micòl

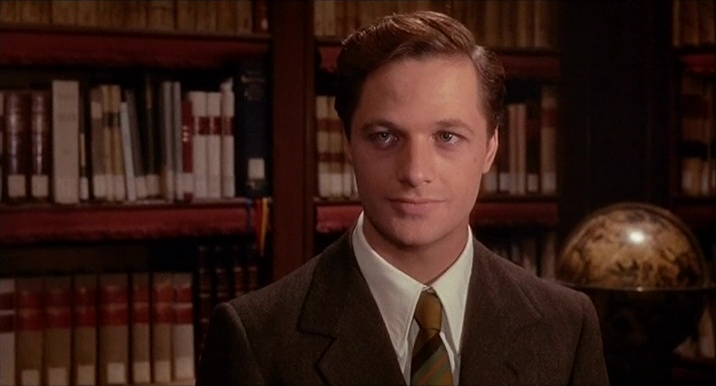
Lino Capolicchio as Giorgio

- Lino Capolicchio as Giorgio
  - Alessandro D'Alatri as young Giorgio
- Dominique Sanda as Micòl Finzi-Contini
  - Cinzia Bruno as young Micòl
- Helmut Berger as Alberto Finzi-Contini
- Fabio Testi as Giampiero Malnate
- Romolo Valli as Beniamino, Giorgio's father
- Camillo Cesarei as Ermanno Finzi-Contini
- Katina Morisani as Olga Finzi-Contini
- Inna Alexeievna as Regina Finzi-Contini
- Barbara Pilavin as Giorgio's mother
- Ettore Geri as Perotti, the majordomo
- Raffaele Curi as Ernesto
- Giampaolo Duregon as Bruno
- Marcella Gentile as Fanny
- Franco Nebbia as Professor De Marchis

=== Casting notes ===
The Garden of the Finzi-Continis marked the debut or near-debut for some of its stars, notably the actors who played the two adult Finzi-Contini children, Micòl and Alberto. For Dominique Sanda (Micòl), it was her first Italian feature film (followed by such films as The Conformist and 1900). For Helmut Berger (Alberto), it was his third feature film.

== Production ==
The director seriously considered entrusting the lead role to singer Patty Pravo, who had to refuse due to too many work commitments.

=== Screenplay ===
In Bassani's novel, the narrator is assumed to be the author himself. In the film, De Sica tells the story entirely through dialogue, with the narrator being the protagonist, Giorgio. The film ends with the Finzi-Contini family's deportation, whereas in the novel, Giorgio, who fled abroad in time to avoid this, recalls the story of his youth and his first impossible love, after 14 years.

=== De Sica and Bassani ===
Initially Giorgio Bassani cooperated in the drafting of the dialogues and the screenplay of the film but after some disagreements and misunderstandings, the writer and the director entered into open conflict (also due to the fact that in the film the relationship between Micòl and Giampiero is made explicit, which is not present in the novel). Bassani asked that his name be removed from the credits of the film. His name was duly removed as one of its script-writers and the opening credits just state that it was "freely derived from the novel by Giorgio Bassani".

=== Locations ===
Villa Ada near Rome was used for the garden, while the Finzi Contini villa is the Litta Bolognini villa in Vedano al Lambro, a municipality in the Brianza area, adjacent to the Monza Park. The entrance to the garden in the film is really in Ferrara, in Corso Ercole I d'Este, near where Bassani had imagined it. The other exteriors were shot in Ferrara; noteworthy are the Estense castle and the city walls, the Palazzo dei Diamanti, the Cathedral of San Giorgio and also some famous streets.

== Reception ==
=== Critical response ===
The film was a great success with audiences, but critics were more mixed. Morando Morandini criticized the film for its "rather corny" portrayal, while Tullio Kezich considered it one of the director's best works in many years, calling it "a masterpiece of 20th-century cinema."

It received acclaim from international critics. On review aggregator Rotten Tomatoes, the film holds an approval rating of 94% based on 16 reviews, with an average score of 7.9/10.

Roger Ebert gave the film 4 out of 4 stars, writing that the film depicted pre-war Italy "as a perpetual wait for something no one admitted would come: war and the persecution of the Jews." Ebert suggested that the titular garden was used as a metaphor for the waiting period in anticipation of war, praising the visual presentation of the garden as creating ambiguity and uneasiness in order to reflect the uncertainty of what would happen to the Finzi-Contini family. Ebert concluded his review by stating that "De Sica's film creates a feeling of nostalgia for a lost time and place, but it isn’t the nostalgia of looking back. It’s the nostalgia of the time itself, when people still inhabiting their world could sense it slipping away, and already missed what they had not yet lost."

American producer and film critic Steven Schneider included the film in his list of "1001 Movies You Must See Before You Die."

=== Awards and nominations ===
In 1972, The Garden of the Finzi-Continis won the Academy Award for Best Foreign Language Film and was nominated for Best Screenplay Based on Material from Another Medium. It won the Golden Bear at the 21st Berlin International Film Festival in 1971. It was De Sica's penultimate film.

== Restoration ==
The restored digital version, curated by the Istituto Luce Cinecittà and performed at the "Studio Cine" in Rome and "The rediscovered image" in Bologna, was presented in the spring of 2015.

== See also ==
- List of Holocaust films
- List of submissions to the 44th Academy Awards for Best Foreign Language Film
- List of Italian submissions for the Academy Award for Best International Feature Film
