= Beautiful Antonio =

1949 novel by Vitaliano Brancati

- Author: Vitaliano Brancati
- Original title: Il bell'Antonio
- Language: Italian
- Publisher: Bompiani
- Publication date: 1949
- Publication place: Italy
- English publication date: 1952
- Pages: 327

Beautiful Antonio (Italian: Il bell'Antonio) is a 1949 novel by the Italian writer Vitaliano Brancati. Set in the 1930s and 1940s, it is about a Sicilian man who easily attracts women with his beauty but fails in his attempted career in Rome and struggles with impotence as he returns to Sicily for marriage. The book deals with themes related to Southern Italian sexual gallismo and Fascist Italy.

The book was first published in English as Antonio, the Great Lover in a 1952 translation by Vladimir Kean where some of the sexual content was omitted. A 1978 unabridged translation by Stanley Hochman was published as Bell'Antonio. A translation by Patrick Creagh was published in 1991 as Bell'Antonio and reissued in 2007 as Beautiful Antonio.

Beautiful Antonio received the 1950 Bagutta Prize. It was the basis for the 1960 film Il bell'Antonio, directed by Mauro Bolognini and starring Marcello Mastroianni in the title role. It was adapted for the screen again in 2005 as the two-part RAI serial Il bell'Antonio, directed by Maurizio Zaccaro and starring Daniele Liotti.
