= Bitter Lemon Press =

- Founded: 2003
- Founder: Fred von Hurter, Francois von Hurter and Laurence Colchester
- Country of origin: United Kingdom
- Headquarters location: London
- Distribution: Turnaround Publisher Services (UK); Consortium Book Sales and Distribution (US); NewSouth Books (Australia)
- Publication types: Books
- Fiction genres: Crime
- Imprints: Wilmington Square Books
- Official website: www.bitterlemonpress.com

Bitter Lemon Press is a small London-based independent publisher, set up by brothers Fred von Hurter and Francois von Hurter and Laurence Colchester in 2003 which specialises in translated literary crime novels and romans noirs from abroad. They currently publish novels by authors such as Gianrico Carofiglio, the famous Swiss crime-writer Friedrich Glauser, Saskia Noort, and the award-winning Cuban writer Leonardo Padura. Several of the novels published have gone on to win or be shortlisted for awards such as the Crime Writers' Association Gold Dagger and the Dublin IMPAC Award . More recently Bitter Lemon has also been publishing books originally in English from such authors as Iain Levison, Elwood Reid and Garry Disher.
