= Don Juan in Sicily =

- Directed by: Alberto Lattuada
- Written by: Vitaliano Brancati (novel); Sabatino Ciuffini; Alberto Lattuada; Attilio Riccio; Giorgio Salvioni
- Starring: Lando Buzzanca
- Cinematography: Roberto Gerardi
- Edited by: Roberto Perpignani
- Release date: 21 April 1967
- Country: Italy
- Language: Italian

Don Giovanni in Sicilia, internationally released as Don Juan in Sicily, is a 1967 Italian comedy-drama film directed by Alberto Lattuada. It is loosely based on the novel with the same title by Vitaliano Brancati.

== Cast ==
- Lando Buzzanca: Giovanni Percolla
- Katia Moguy: Ninetta Marconella
- Katia Christine: Françoise
- Ewa Aulin: Wanda
- Stefania Careddu: Landlady
- Carletto Sposito: Scannapieco
- Elio Crovetto
