= Paolo il caldo =

Italian novel

Paolo il caldo (in English: Hot Paolo) is a novel by Vitaliano Brancati. It was the basis for a 1974 Italian film.

== Novel ==
The novel is set in Catania and in Rome around the time of the Second World War. It tells the story of a Sicilian baron who gives in to desires of the flesh, beginning at an early age and continuing through his adulthood, when he realizes what an empty life he has led. The book explores the themes of sexual passion and of lust, sometimes unbridled and morbid.

The novel was published in 1955, a year after the author's death.

== Movie ==
The Sensual Man (Italian: Paolo il caldo) is loosely based on Brancati's novel, with the screenplay written by Marco Vicario. Vicario also directed the movie, that was played by Giancarlo Giannini in the role of Paolo and Rossana Podestà as Lilia.
