= Silvano Ceccherini =

Italian anarchist (1915–1974)

- Born: 1915; Livorno, Italy
- Died: 1974; Minusio, Italy
- Occupation: autobiographical novelist
- Years active: 1963–1974

Silvano Ceccherini (1915–1974) was an Italian anarchist and autobiographical novelist.

== Life ==
Born in Livorno in 1915, Ceccherini, nicknamed the "Italian Jean Genet" for the life experiences common to those of the French writer, abandoned his studies in the fourth grade and at the age of sixteen he turned to petty crime. Longshoreman, anarchist, vagabond, robber and bandit of the "Tenuta del Tombolo" pine forest, from 1934 to 1939 he served for five years in the French Foreign Legion. Enlisted in Sidi Bel Abbes, Ceccherini was trained in the 1st foreign Regiment in Saida and after four months he was transferred to the 2nd RE in Meknès in Morocco.

He described his legionary adventure in the novel "Sassi su tutte le strade", published in 1968. In 1940 while serving in the Regia Marina, he was sentenced to five years in military prison for beating an officer. After escaping in 1944, he lived immediately after the war in the "tenuta del tombolo" pine forest, on the edge of the military camp of the American army, in a tent with a prostitute, for illegal trafficking and robberies.

Captured after a firefight with the police, he suffered another sentence of eighteen years of imprisonment which he served in the prisons of Pisa, San Gimignano, Saluzzo and for the most part in the maximum security prison of Porto Azzurro.

Released from prison, he lived in France and Switzerland to return in 1973, now ill, to Livorno, where he died the following year, in 1974.

Ceccherini made his debut in Italian literature in 1963 with the novel The transfer, based on his life as a prisoner. based on his own experiences as a prisoner, and had success both in Italy and abroad.

== Works ==
- La traduzione, 1963. Translated by Isabel Quigly as The transfer. London: Eyre & Spottiswoode, 1966.
- La signorina della posta; e, Falsi soldati, 1964.
- Dopo l'ira, 1965
- Lo specchio nell'ascensore, 1967
- Sassi su tutte le strade, 1968
- L'avventuriero di Dio, 1971
- Il prezzo della saggezza, 1974
