= Giorgio Albertazzi =

Italian actor and film director (1923–2016)

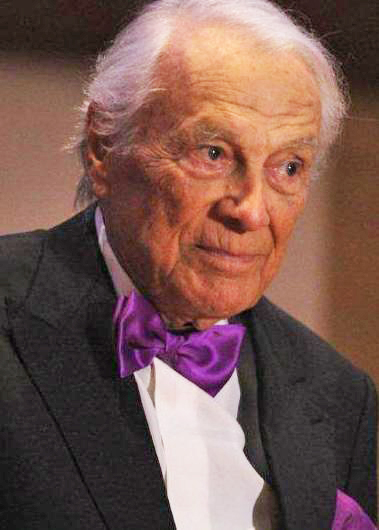
- Born: 20 August 1923; Fiesole, Kingdom of Italy
- Died: 28 May 2016 (aged 92); Roccastrada, Italy
- Occupations: Actor, film director
- Years active: 1949–2016
- Height: 1.72 m (5 ft 8 in)
- Spouse: Pia de Tolomei (m. 2007)
- Partner: Anna Proclemer
- Awards: Order of Merit of the Italian Republic (1996)

Giorgio Albertazzi (20 August 1923 – 28 May 2016) was an Italian actor and film director.

== Early life and education ==
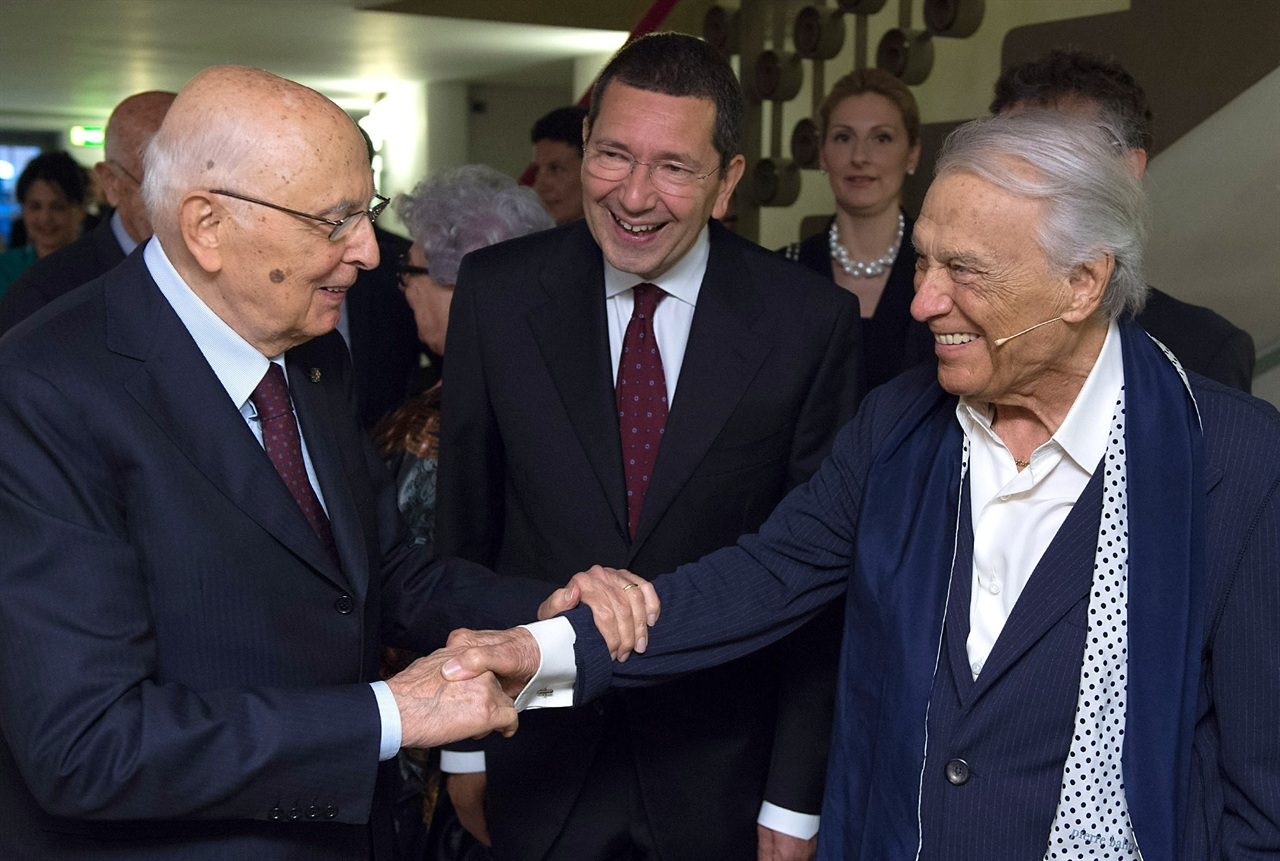
Albertazzi (right) with Giorgio Napolitano (left) and Ignazio Marino (center)

Born in San Martino a Mensola, Tuscany, Albertazzi joined the Italian Social Republic and reached the rank of lieutenant. After their defeat, he spent two years in prison for collaborating. Following the amnesty by Palmiro Togliatti he changed from studying architecture to acting.

== Career ==
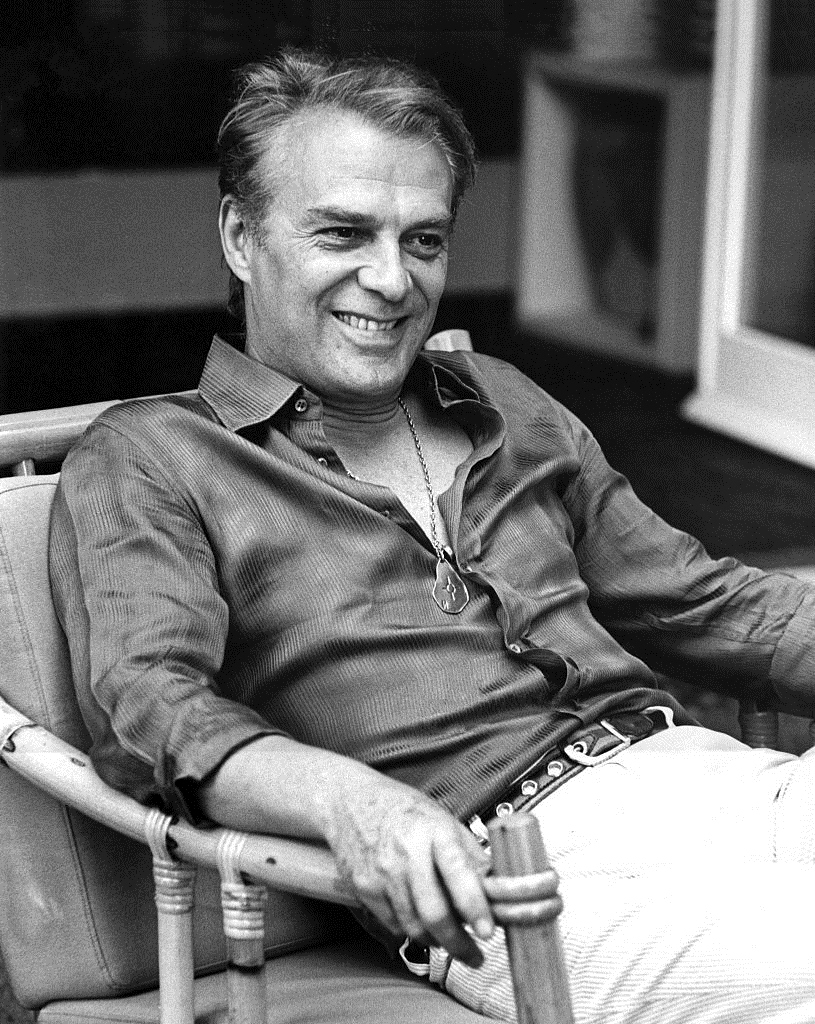
Giorgio Albertazzi in 1974

In the theater Albertazzi debuted in Shakespeare's Troilus and Cressida, and over the following decades starred in a number of classics, many of them for television. From the early 1950s he was also seen on the big screen and appeared in more than 50 films. From 1969, he directed several television films, including the miniseries George Sand in 1981. From 2003, he was the director of the Teatro di Roma.

== Personal life ==
He had a close friendship with actress Anna Proclemer who appeared with him for many years. In 2007, Albertazzi married his long-standing partner, Pia de Tolomei. Albertazzi was atheist.

In 1988 he wrote his memoirs. He died on 28 May 2016, at the age of 92.

== Filmography ==
Film
Year	Title	Role	Notes
1951	Lorenzaccio	Lorenzo De' Medici detto Lorenzaccio	
1952	Little World of Don Camillo	Don Pietro	Uncredited
1952	Article 519, Penal Code	Franco – fidanzato di Luisa	
1953	The Merchant of Venice	Lorenzo	
1953	I Piombi di Venezia	Captain Giuliano	
1953	Gioventù alla sbarra	Marco	
1954	Storm	Il coloniale	
1954	Concert of Intrigue	Conte Enrico Alberti	
1954	Uomini ombra	Dario Saltini	
1957	White Nights	L'inquilino / Narratore	Uncredited
1957	Marisa la civetta	Antonio	Voice, Uncredited
1958	Un flauto in paradiso		Voice
1960	Labbra rosse	Carrei	
1961	Last Year at Marienbad	X – l'homme à l'accent italien	
1961	Morte di un bandito	Don Luigino	
1962	Redhead	Patrick O'Malley	
1962	Eva	Sergio Branco Malloni – a movie director	Uncredited
1963	Violenza segreta	Enrico Maraini – un giovane esploratore	
1967	I Married You for Fun	Pietro	
1968	Darling Caroline	Albencet, le géologiste	
1970	Gradiva	L'amico di Norbert – un psichiatra	
1972	The Assassination of Trotsky	Commissioner	
1974	Five Women for the Killer	Professor Aldo Betti	
1975	La nottata	Destino	
1975	Mark of the Cop	Questore	
1994	Once a Year, Every Year	Lorenzo	
1996	Fatal Frames – Fotogrammi mortali	Father	
1998	Crimine contro crimine	Filippo Maria	
1999	Li chiamarono... briganti!	Il cardinale Antonelli	
2001	Tutta la conoscenza del mondo	Il professore Perotti	
2003	L'avvocato De Gregorio	De Gregorio	
2004	Ora e per sempre	Pietro anziano	
2007	Memorie di Adriano		
2008	The Rage	Produttore commerciale	
2011	Some Say No	Barone De Rolandis	
2016	La sindrome di Antonio	Klingsor	(final film role)

== Discography ==
=== Album ===
- 1961 – D'Annunzio – Brani scelti da la figlia di Jorio (La voce del padrone, QELP 8045, LP) with Anna Proclemer
- 1963 – Eliot – La terra desolata (Stereoletteraria, SPM 103, LP)
- 1974 – La solitudine (Cetra, LP) with Vittorio Gassman
- Dante – Inferno (Sansoni Accademia Editori, SLI 03, LP) with Tino Buzzelli, Tino Carraro, Ottavio Fanfani, Davide Montemurri
- Dante – La divina commedia – Paradiso (Nuova Accademia Del Disco, BLI 2005, LP) with Ernesto Calindri, Tino Carraro, Anna Proclemer, Ottavio Fanfani
- Eluard (LP) with Gérard Philipe
- Leopardi – Canti (Cetra, CLC 0829, LP) with Arnoldo Foà, Vittorio Gassman, Alberto Lupo
- Neruda – 20 poesie d'amore e una canzone disperata (SPM 101, LP)
- Pasternak – Poesie (SPM 102, LP)

=== Singles ===
- 1955 – Petrarca (Cetra – Collana Letteraria Documento, CL 0418, EP 7")
- 1957 – Solitudine (Cetra – Collana Letteraria Documento, CL 0434, EP 7")
- 1961 – Lettere d'amore (Cetra – Collana Letteraria Documento, CL 0477, EP 7")
- 1965 – Discorso della montagna (Cetra – Collana Letteraria Documento, CL 0419, EP 7")
- 1969 – Questa cosa che chiamiamo mondo/Tema di Linda (Carosello, CL 20222, 7") from the television series Jekyll
- 1969 – Ti amo... ed io di più/Sospendi il tempo (Boradway International, 7") with Anna Proclemer
- 1970 – Miraggio d'estate/Miraggio d'estate (Carosello, 7") with Penny Brown
- I fioretti di S. Francesco (Istituto Internazionale Del Disco, SIL 4001, EP 7") with Antonio Baldini
- Giorgio Sacchetti – Tre novelle lette da Giorgio Albertazzi (Istituto Internazionale Del Disco, SIL 4096, EP 7")
- Neruda, Barcarola e altre poesie (Nuova Accademia Disco, DP 6008, EP)

== Awards ==
- Italy: Knight Grand Cross of the Order of Merit of the Italian Republic (26 June 1996)
- Benemeriti della cultura e dell'arte (2003)
