= Don Giovanni in Sicilia (novel) =

1941 novel by Vitaliano Brancati

- Cover of Don Giovanni in Sicilia
- Author: Vitaliano Brancati
- Language: Italian
- Genre: Fiction narrative
- Published: 1941
- Publication place: Italy
- Media type: Print
- ISBN: 9788806188672
- OCLC: 917487376

Don Giovanni in Sicilia is a novel by Vitaliano Brancati, published in 1941.

The main character of the novel, Giovanni Percolla, is used to depict the scenario of male sexual conceit (in Italian: gallismo) characterising Sicily in the late 1930s.

In 1967, director Alberto Lattuada adapted the novel into a film of the same name.
