= Patrick Creagh =

British poet and translator

John Patrick Brasier-Creagh, best known as Patrick Creagh (23 October 1930 - 19 September 2012), was a British poet and translator.

== Life ==
Patrick Creagh was educated at Wellington College and Brasenose College, Oxford. He and his first wife, Lola Segre, lived in Rome until her sudden death in 1960.

Creagh returned to London, losing all his books in transit, but returned to Italy in the late 1960s, travelling with Derek Raymond in an army truck. His second wife Ursula Barr was the ex-wife of Al Alvarez and a granddaughter of D. H. Lawrence's wife. After she inherited the rights to Lady Chatterley's Lover, the pair were able to buy an old farmhouse called Spanda north of Siena.

Creagh met the composer John Eaton while teaching at Princeton University, and wrote several libretti for him.

In the early 1980s Creagh and Barr separated, and Creagh subsequently lived with his partner Susan Rose, née James, at Panzano in Chianti.

== Works ==
=== Poetry ===
- Row of Pharaohs, Heinemann, 1962
- A Picture of Tristan: Imitations of Tristan Corbière, 1965.
- Dragon Jack-Knifed, 1966
- To Abel and others, 1970
- The lament of the border-guard, 1980

=== Translations ===
- Design as art by Bruno Munari, 1970
- Selected poems by Giuseppe Ungaretti, 1971
- Architecture as environment by Flavio Conti, 1978
- Splendor of the gods by Flavio Giovanni Conti, 1978
- The Moral Essays or Moral Tales by Giacomo Leopardi, 1983
- Danube by Claudio Magris, 1989: winner of the John Florio Prize 1990
- Blind Argus by Gesualdo Bufalino, 1989: winner of the John Florio Prize 1990
- Beautiful Antonio by Vitaliano Brancati, 1993
- The keeper of ruins and other inventions by Gesualdo Bufalino, 1994
- Pereira declares: a testimony by Antonio Tabucchi, 1995
- The chimera by Sebastiano Vassalli, 1995
- The lament of the linnet by Anna Maria Ortese
- The missing head of Damasceno Monteiro by Antonio Tabucchi, 1999
- Tommaso and the blind photographer by Gesualdo Bufalino, 2000
- The Advocate by Marcello Fois, 2001
- Involuntary witness by Gianrico Carofiglio, 2005
- Memory of the Abyss by Marcello Fois 2012: winner of the John Florio Prize 2014
