= Vitaliano Brancati =

Italian novelist, dramatist, poet and screenwriter

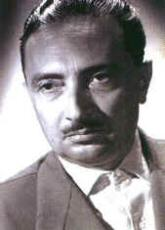
- Born: 24 July 1907; Pachino, Sicily, Kingdom of Italy
- Died: 25 September 1954 (aged 47); Turin, Piedmont, Italy
- Occupation: author
- Spouse: Anna Proclemer (m. 1946)
- Children: 1

Vitaliano Brancati (Italian pronunciation: [vitaˈljaːno braŋˈkaːti]; 24 July 1907 – 25 September 1954) was an Italian novelist, dramatist, poet and screenwriter.

== Biography ==
Born in Pachino, Syracuse, Brancati studied in Catania, where he graduated in letters and where he spent most of his life. While he started writing at a young age and at 25 years old he was already the author of six books, which were largely influenced by fascist ideals and which were later rejected by the same Brancati, critics tend to set the starting point of his career in 1935, when he released the collection of short stories In search of a cause. Brancati got his first and probably major success in 1941, with the novel Don Giovanni in Sicilia, a vibrant and humorous portrait of the Sicilian temperament.

In 1944, he wrote the novel Gli anni perduti (The Lost Years), a bold satire of Benito Mussolini’s megalomania. Two years later, in 1946, he published Vecchio con gli stivali (Old Man in Boots), a satirical short story inspired by the trials of Italian fascism, which won the Vendemmia Award and which was adapted into a successful film, Difficult Years by Luigi Zampa. In 1950 he won the Bagutta Prize with one another well-known novel, Il bell'Antonio ("Beautiful Antonio"). He was one of the contributors of a cultural magazine, Omnibus.

He died in a clinic in Turin after a major surgery. He was married to actress Anna Proclemer and the couple had a daughter together.

== Selected works ==
=== Novels and short stories ===
- Don Giovanni in Sicilia (1941), adapted into the film internationally released as Don Juan in Sicily (1967)
- Gli anni perduti (1944) (The Lost Years (1992), trans. Patrick Creagh)
- Il bell'Antonio (1949) (Antonio: The Great Lover (1952), Beautiful Antonio (1993), trans. Patrick Creagh); adapted into the film Il bell'Antonio (1960)
- Vecchio con gli stivali (1946), a short story, adapted into the film Anni difficili (Difficult Years) (1948)

=== Screenplays ===
- La bella addormentata (Sleeping Beauty) (1942)
- Don Cesare di Bazan (1942)
- Gelosia (Jealousy) (1942)
- Signori, in carrozza! (Rome-Paris-Rome) (1951)
- È più facile che un cammello... (His Last Twelve Hours) (1951)
- Anni facili (Easy Years) (1953)
- L'arte di arrangiarsi (The Art of Getting Along) (1954)
- Paolo il caldo (Hot Paolo) (1955)
