= Gianrico Carofiglio =

Italian novelist

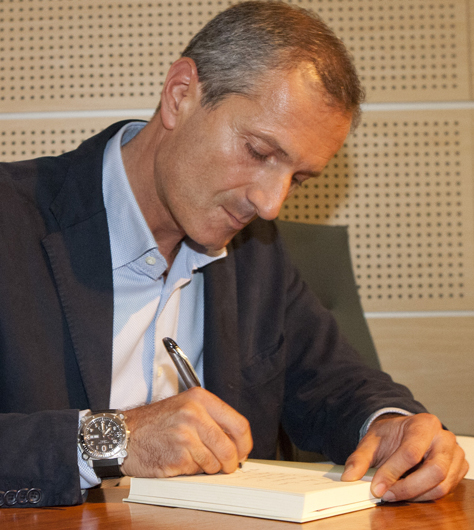

Member of the Senate
- In office 19 April 2008 – 14 March 2013

Personal details
- Born: 30 May 1961 (age 65) Bari, Italy
- Party: Democratic Party
- Education: University of Bari
- Occupation: Magistrate, novelist

Gianrico Carofiglio (born 30 May 1961) is an Italian novelist and former anti-Mafia judge in the city of Bari. His debut novel, Involuntary Witness, published in 2002 and translated into English in 2005 by Patrick Creagh, was published by the Bitter Lemon Press and has been adapted as the basis for a popular television series in Italy.

The subsequent novels were translated by Howard Curtis and Antony Shugaar. Carofiglio won the 2005 Premio Bancarella award for his novel Il passato è una terra straniera. He is also Honorary President of The Edinburgh Gadda Prize which celebrates the work of Carlo Emilio Gadda.

== Early life and career ==
Gianrico Carofiglio was born in Bari and has worked for many years as a prosecutor specialized in organized crime. He was appointed as advisor of the anti-Mafia committee in the Italian Parliament in 2007 and served as a senator from 2008 to 2013.

== Writing career ==
Carofiglio makes his début in fiction in 2002 with Testimone inconsapevole (Involuntary Witness, Premio del Giovedì "Marisa Rusconi", Premio Rhegium Iulii, Premio Città di Cuneo, Premio Città di Chiavari), the book that introduces the beloved character of the defense lawyer Guido Guerrieri.

Officer of the Carabinieri Pietro Fenoglio is the protagonist of another series of novels: Una mutevole verità (A Shifting Truth, 2014, Premio Scerbanenco), L'estate fredda (The Cold Summer, 2016), La versione di Fenoglio (Fenoglio's Version, 2019).

Among Carofiglio's other fiction and nonfiction works: the novels Il passato è una terra straniera (The Past is a Foreign Land, 2004, Premio Bancarella 2005), which became in 2008 an internationally acclaimed film, directed by Daniele Vicari and starring Michele Riondino and Elio Germano (Knight Grand Jury Prize and Best Actor at the Miami Film Festival).

== Bibliography ==
=== Guido Guerrieri ===
- Involuntary Witness – 2005 (Testimone inconsapevole) translated by Patrick Creagh, published in English – ISBN 978-1-904738-52-7
- A Walk in the Dark – 2006 (Ad occhi chiusi) translated by Howard Curtis, published in English – ISBN 978-1-904738-53-4
- Reasonable Doubts – 2007 (Ragionevoli dubbi) translated by Howard Curtis, published in English – ISBN 978-1-904738-54-1
- Temporary Perfections – 2011 (Le perfezioni provvisorie) translated by Antony Shugaar, published in English – ISBN 978-1-904738-72-5
- A fine line – 2014, (La regola dell'equilibrio) translated by Howard Curtis, published in English – ISBN 978-1-908524-61-4
- The Measure of Time – 2021 (La misura del tempo) translated by Howard by Curtis, published in English, Bitter Lemon Press, 2021

=== Other ===
- The Past is a Foreign Country – 2004 (Il passato è una terra straniera) published in English in 2007
- Neither Here Nor Elsewhere: A Night in Bari – 2008 (Né qui né altrove: una notte a Bari)
- There is no Wisdom – 2010 (Non esiste saggezza)
- The Setting-free of Words – 2010 (La manomissione delle parole)
- The Silence of the Wave – 2011 (Il silenzio dell'onda) translated to English by Howard Curtis, published in 2013 by Bitter Lemon Press – ISBN 978-1-908524-23-2
- The Vertiginous Edge of Things – 2013 (Il bordo vertiginoso delle cose)
- A Changing Truth – 2014 (Una mutevole verità)
- The Cold Summer – 2016 (L'estate fredda) translated to English by Howard Curtis, published in 2018 by Bitter Lemon Press
- Three O'Clock in the Morning - 2017 (Tre del mattino) translated by Howard Curtis, published in 2021 by HarperVia (USA)
