= Giorgio Bassani =

Italian writer

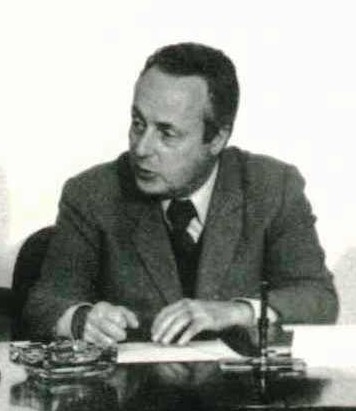
- Giorgio Bassani in 1974
- Born: 4 March 1916; Bologna, Italy
- Died: 13 April 2000 (aged 84); Rome, Italy
- Occupations: Author; editor; poet; essayist

Giorgio Bassani (4 March 1916 – 13 April 2000) was an Italian novelist, poet, essayist, editor, and intellectual.

== Biography ==
Bassani was born in Bologna into a prosperous Jewish family of Ferrara, where he spent his childhood with his mother Dora, father Enrico (a doctor), brother Paolo, and sister Jenny. In 1934, he completed his studies at his secondary school, the liceo classico L. Ariosto in Ferrara. The high school's historical archive contains many documents and photos concerning his young life, which are displayed in the atrium that they dedicated to him. Music had been his first great passion, and he considered a career as a pianist; however, literature soon became the focus of his artistic interests.

In 1935, he enrolled in the Faculty of Letters of the University of Bologna. Commuting to lectures by train (third class) from Ferrara, he studied under the art historian Roberto Longhi. His ideal of the "free intellectual" was the liberal historian and philosopher Benedetto Croce. Despite the anti-Semitic race laws which were introduced in 1938, he was able to graduate in 1939, writing a thesis on the nineteenth-century writer, journalist, radical and lexicographer Niccolò Tommaseo. As a Jew in 1939, however, work opportunities were now limited, and he became a schoolteacher in the Jewish School of Ferrara in via Vignatagliata.

In 1940, his first book, Una città di pianura ("A City of the Plain"), was published under the pseudonym "Giacomo Marchi" in order to evade the race laws. He chose the name of Dora's brother, Giacomo Minerbi, and the surname of his maternal grandmother, Emma Marchi. During this period, along with friends he had made in Ferrara's intellectual circle, he became a clandestine political activist. His activity in the anti-fascist resistance led to his arrest in May 1943; he was released on 26 July, the day after Benito Mussolini was ousted from power.

A little over a week later, he married Valeria Sinigallia, whom he had met playing tennis. They moved to Florence for a brief period, living under assumed names, then at the end of the year, to Rome, where he spent the rest of his life. His first volume of poems, Storie dei poveri amanti e altri versi, appeared in 1944; a second, Te lucis ante, followed in 1947. He edited the literary review Botteghe oscure for Princess Marguerite Caetani from its founding in 1948 until it ceased publication in 1960.

In 1953, La passeggiata prima di cena appeared and in 1954, Gli ultimi anni di Clelia Trotti. In the same year, he became editor of Paragone, a journal founded by Longhi and his wife, Anna Banti. Bassani's writings reached a wider audience in 1956 with the publication of the Premio Strega-winning book of short stories, Cinque storie ferraresi (the five stories are Lida Mantovani, La passeggiata prima di cena, Una lapide in via Mazzini, Gli ultimi anni di Clelia Trotti, and Una notte del '43).

As an editorial director of Feltrinelli, Bassani was responsible for the posthumous publication in 1958 of Giuseppe Tomasi di Lampedusa's Il Gattopardo, a novel which had been rejected by Elio Vittorini at Mondadori, and Einaudi. It became one of the great successes of post-war Italian literature. Bassani's enthusiastic editing of the text, following instructions from Elena Croce (daughter of Benedetto), who had offered him the manuscript, later became controversial; however, recent editions have been published which follow the manuscript more closely.

Also in 1958, Bassani's novel Gli occhiali d'oro (made into a film in 1987) was published, an examination, in part, of the marginalisation of Jews and homosexuals. Together with stories from Cinque storie ferraresi (reworked and under the new title Dentro le mura (1973)), it was to form part of a series of works known collectively as Il romanzo di Ferrara, which explored the city, with its Christian and Jewish elements, its perspectives and its landscapes. The series includes: Il giardino dei Finzi-Contini (The Garden of the Finzi-Continis, 1962, Premio Viareggio prizewinner); Dietro la porta (1964); L'airone (1968) and L'odore del fieno (1972). These works realistically document the Italian Jewish community under Fascism in a style that manifests the difficulties of searching for truth in the meanderings of memory and moral conscience. In 1960, one of his short stories (Una notte del '43, from Cinque storie ferraresi) was adapted as the film Long Night in 1943. A stage adaptation of The Garden of the Finzi-Continis by opera composer Ricky Ian Gordon is set to premiere in January 2022. It is a co-production of National Yiddish Theatre Folksbiene and the New York City Opera.

From 1965 to 1980, Giorgio Bassani was the president of the organization Italia Nostra.

Bassani died in 2000 and was buried in the Jewish Cemetery in Ferrara, the same place where he located the graves of the family Finzi-Contini. He was survived by his estranged wife, Valeria and their two children, Paola (born 1 September 1945) and Enrico (born 29 June 1949). He had been with his companion, Portia Prebys, since shortly after they met in 1977. The city of Ferrara decided to commemorate his life by giving his name to the Communal Library and the Urban Park in the Northern part of the city.

Bassani received the Charles Veillon, the Strega, the Campiello, the Viareggio and the Nelly Sachs prizes. He collaborated on several screenplays.

== Awards ==
- 1956 - Strega Prize for "Cinque storie ferraresi"
- 1962 - Viareggio Prize
- 1969 - Nelly Sachs Prize
- 1969 - Campiello Prize for "L'airone"
- 1983 - Bagutta Prize for "In rima e senza"
- 1987 - Pirandello Prize
- 1992 - Feltrinelli Prize for Prose

== Publications ==
- Within the Walls (Dentro le mura) – 1956
- The Gold-rimmed Spectacles (Gli occhiali d'oro) – 1958
- A Prospect of Ferrara (Cinque storie ferraresi) – 1962
- The Garden of the Finzi-Continis (Il giardino dei Finzi-Contini) – 1962
- The Heron (L'airone) – 1970
- Five Stories of Ferrara (Cinque storie ferraresi) – 1971
- The Smell of Hay (L'odore del fieno) – 1972
- Behind the Door (Dietro la porta) – 1972
- Il romanzo di Ferrara (1974; revised 1980). The Novel of Ferrara, trans. Jamie McKendrick (2018)
- Rolls Royce and Other Poems (extracts from Epitaffio and In gran segreto) – 1982

=== Film adaptations ===
- Long Night in 1943
- The Garden of the Finzi-Continis
- The Gold Rimmed Glasses

== Sources ==
- Guia Risari, The Document within the Walls. The Romance of Bassani, Troubador Publishing, Leics, I. ed. 1999, II ed. 2004, ISBN 1 899293 66 3
- Alessandro Giardino, Giorgio Bassani. Percorsi dello sguardo nelle arti visive, Fernandel, 2011 Giorgio Pozzi Editore, 2013
- Paola Polito, L'officina dell'ineffabile. Ripetizione, memoria e non detto in Giorgio Bassani, Giorgio Pozzi Editore, 2014
- Giorgio Bassani, Lezioni americane di Giorgio Bassani, a cura di Valerio Cappozzo, Ravenna, Giorgio Pozzi Editore, 2016
- www.italialibri.net :: Il romanzo di Ferrara – Bassani (in Italian)
- Poscritto a Giorgio Bassani. Saggi in Memoria del Decimo Anniversario della Morte [Postscriptum: Critical Essays on Giorgio Bassani in Memory of the Tenth Anniversary of his Death], R. Antognini e R. Diaconescu Blumenfeld (edd.), LED Edizioni Universitarie, Milano 2012, ISBN 978-88-7916-510-5
- Massimo Colella, «Tutti i versi da me scritti fino ad oggi». Il primo tempo della poesia di Giorgio Bassani, in «Rassegna europea di letteratura italiana», 51–52, 2018, pp. 169–194.
- Massimo Colella, Fisionomia di una raccolta poetica dimenticata: 'L’alba ai vetri' di Giorgio Bassani (1963), in «Quaderni d’Italianistica» (Toronto), 40, 2, 2019, pp. 83–112.
