= T-Zero =

T-Zero may refer to:

- "T-Zero" riot response squad, an organization featured in Urban Chaos: Riot Response
- Trauma Zero, formerly T-Zero
- t zero, a collection of stories by Italian author Italo Calvino
