= Qfwfq =

Character by Italo Calvino

Qfwfq is the narrator of many stories appearing in several works by Italian author Italo Calvino including Cosmicomics.

== Description ==
Qfwfq is as old as the universe and has taken various forms, of which Qfwfq retains his memory. For example, in the short story "Blood, Sea" (found in the collection t zero) this character is a man riding in a car with three other people, but this man also remembers when he lived in the form of an amoeba of sorts inhabiting a primeval ocean. He also describes Zylphia, one of the other car passengers, as having been there, raising the question of whether Qfwfq is able to take multiple discrete physical forms at once. Qfwfq also describes having a family, who seem also to transcend time in a similar manner (for example, in "The Aquatic Uncle," Qfwfq's uncle remains a fish when the rest of the family has evolved into amphibians).

Qfwfq is creative and remarkably intelligent, demonstrating a remarkable ability to predict natural and human history in "How Much Shall We Bet." He is competitive and often romantically jealous. For instance, in "A Sign in Space," he tells of competitive relationship with a similar entity named Kgwgk, which results in the invention of art. His stories are populated by other entities who are his friends or rivals, who also seem to take many forms throughout the universe's history and whom he may meet again in the present day. He is described as "not surprised by anything", and characteristically "not at all sentimental about being the last dinosaur".

== Books in which character appears ==
- Cosmicomics – Qfwfq explicitly narrates all but two of the short stories in this collection.
- t zero – Qfwfq narrates most of the stories in this collection. The first four stories are in a section titled, "More of Qfwfq".
- Numbers in the Dark and other stories – Qfwfq narrates the final two stories in this collection, "Implosion" and "Nothing and Not Much".
- The Complete Cosmicomics – A 2009 collection including all of Qfwfq's stories from the above books and several newly translated to English.
- Time and the Hunter - part 1 of the collection of short stories is titled More of Qfwfq.

== Qfwfq's name ==
The name "Qfwfq" (as well as "Kgwgk") is a palindrome. The name may be an allusion to the first law of thermodynamics; substituting = for f gives Q=W=Q, which describes a heat engine.
