= TZero =

TZero may refer to:

- AC Propulsion tzero, automobile
- t zero, a collection of stories by Italian author Italo Calvino
- t_{0}, a symbol used in mathematics referring to the starting point or the beginning of time within a system
