= Difficult Loves =

Short story collection by Italo Calvino

- First edition
- Author: Italo Calvino
- Language: Italian
- Published: 1970 (Einaudi)
- Publication place: Italy
- Media type: Print

Difficult Loves (Italian: Gli amori difficili) is a 1970 short story collection by Italo Calvino. It concerns love and the difficulty of communication.

Some published versions of the English translation by William Weaver omit a number of the stories, and also include other Calvino stories about the Second World War and postwar period, including those from The Crow Comes Last; some of these were translated by Archibald Colquhoun and Peggy Wright. "The Argentine Ant" and "The Cloud of Smog" (as "Smog") do not appear in this book, but rather in the translated The Watcher and Other Stories. An English translation of "The Adventure of a Skier" was published by The New Yorker in their July 3, 2017 issue.

== Stories ==
Starred stories are those also included in the incomplete versions of the English translation.

=== Difficult Loves ===
- The Adventure of a Soldier*
- The Adventure of a Bandit
- The Adventure of a Bather*
- The Adventure of a Clerk*
- The Adventure of a Photographer*
- The Adventure of a Traveler*
- The Adventure of a Reader*
- The Adventure of a Nearsighted Man*
- The Adventure of a Wife
- The Adventure of Two Spouses
- The Adventure of a Poet*
- The Adventure of a Skier
- The Adventure of a Motorist

=== Difficult Life ===
- The Argentine Ant
- The Cloud of Smog

== Adaptations ==
The "Adventure of Two Spouses" was loosely adapted into the "Renzo and Luciana" act of Boccaccio '70; the "Adventure of a Soldier" appears as one part of Of Wayward Love, a film by Nino Manfredi.
