= Lightness (disambiguation) =

Lightness may refer to:

- Lightness, a property of a color
- Lightness (philosophy), a philosophical concept most closely associated with continental philosophy and existentialism, which is used in ontology
- A relatively low weight, mass or density of an object or material
