= Mameli (disambiguation) =

Mameli may refer to:

== People ==
- Goffredo Mameli (1827–1849), Italian patriot, poet and writer
- Patrick Mameli (born 1966), Dutch musician
- Eva Mameli (1886–1978), Italian botanist, and naturalist
- Mameli (singer) (born 1995), Italian singer-songwriter

== Other uses ==
- Logistic Battalion "Mameli", inactive military logistics battalion of the Italian Army
- Mameli-class submarine, one of the first classes of the submarines to be built for the Regia Marina (Royal Italian Navy) after the First World War
- 32nd Armored Brigade "Mameli", armored brigade of the Italian Army
