= Lightness (philosophy) =

Lightness is a philosophical concept most closely associated with continental philosophy and existentialism, which is used in ontology. The term "lightness" varies in usage but is differentiated from physical weight, such as "the lightness of balsa wood". In other words, "light like a bird," as Paul Valéry wrote, "and not like a feather". Lightness is also considered as a noun.

== Milan Kundera ==
Milan Kundera's 1984 novel The Unbearable Lightness of Being is an exploration of the concept of Lightness.

Kundera uses Friedrich Nietzsche's doctrine of the Eternal Return to illustrate Lightness. Eternal Return dictates that all things in existence recur over and over again for all eternity. This is to say that human history is a preset circle without progress, the same events arising perpetually and doomed never to alter or to improve. Existence is thus weighty because it stands fixed in an infinite cycle. This weightiness is “the heaviest of burdens”, for “if every second of our lives recurs an infinite number of times, we are nailed to eternity as Jesus Christ was nailed to the cross.” At the same time, it is necessary for any event to occur in the cycle of events exactly as it has always occurred for the cycle to be identical; consequently, everything takes on an eternally fixed meaning. This fact prevents one from believing things to be fleeting and worthless.

The inverse of this concept is Kundera's “unbearable lightness of being.” Assuming that eternal return were impossible, humankind would experience an “absolute absence of burden,” and this would “[cause] man to be lighter than air” in his lack of weight of meaning. Something which does not forever recur has its brief existence, and, once it is complete, the universe goes on existing, utterly indifferent to the completed phenomenon. “Life which disappears once and for all, which does not return” writes Kundera, is “without weight...and whether it was horrible, beautiful, or sublime...means nothing.” Each life is insignificant; every decision does not matter. Since decisions do not matter, they are "light": they do not tie us down. However, at the same time, the insignificance of our decisions - our lives, or being - is unbearable. Hence, "the unbearable lightness of being." On the other hand, eternal existence would demand of us strict adherence to prescripted rules and laws; a sense of duty and rigorous morality.

"What then shall we choose? Weight or lightness?" Kundera notes that this is not a new question. Parmenides posed it in the sixth century BC. He saw the world divided into pairs of opposites: light/darkness, fineness/coarseness etc. One half of the opposition he called positive (light, fineness, warmth, being), the other negative. We might find this division into positive and negative poles simple except for one difficulty: which one is positive, weight or lightness? Parmenides responded that lightness is positive, weight negative. Kundera then questions "Was he correct or not?" The lightness/weight opposition remains the most ambiguous of all. Kundera then asks, should one live with weight and duty or with lightness and freedom? In Nietzschean terms, weight is life-affirming in that to live with positive intensity is to live in a way you'd be prepared to repeat. The emptiness of Sabina's life in 'The Unbearable Lightness Of Being', and that she wanted to "die in lightness" – which is to say that she is indifferent to her life – shows that she would not want to repeat her life and would not accept an eternal return.

== Italo Calvino ==
Similarly to Greek philosopher Heraclitus, for Italo Calvino, Lightness is the flexible; the weightless; the mobile; the connective; vectors as distinct from structures. Italo Calvino explored Lightness in the first of his Six Memos for the Next Millennium. He saw Lightness as an important aspect of post-modern society and existence that should be celebrated; he, like Heraclitus, never viewed Lightness as negative, indeed he never ascribed any evaluative content to it.

Calvino keenly explores the borderline between lightness and the superficial; he posits that a contemplative lightness may make light-heartnedness seem heavy and dim; the pursuit of lightness as a reaction to the dutifulness of life.

Calvino emphasises that he does not intend to exclude or to define as inferior the opposite, as for example light/heavy, quick/slow; instant deduction is not necessarily better than well-considered thought, the case may be even contrary. It simply communicates something which is only emblematic of lightness. The balance or tension between the two 'poles' is an important aspect.

In Six Memos he says that "It is true that software cannot exercise its powers of lightness except through the weight of hardware. But it is the software that gives the orders, acting on the outside world and on machines that exist only as functions of software and evolve so that they can work out ever more complex programs. The second industrial revolution, unlike the first, does not present us with such crushing images as rolling mills and molten steel, but with 'bits' in a flow of information traveling along circuits in the form of electronic impulses. The iron machines still exist, but they obey the orders of weightless bits."

== Eastern philosophy ==
The Yoga Sutras of Patanjali also deal with Lightness. Book 3 describes Lightness or Laghima as being one of the eight siddhis, or eight perfections: the capacity to offset the force of one's facticity. This is defined in relation to Pullness or Garima, which concerns worldly weight and mass.

Zen Buddhism teaches that one ought to become as light as being itself. Zen teaches one not only to find the lightness of being “bearable,” but to rejoice in this lightness. This stands as an interesting opposition to Kundera's evaluation of Lightness.
