= Oedipus rex (opera) =

1927 opera-oratorio by Igor Stravinsky

- by Igor Stravinsky
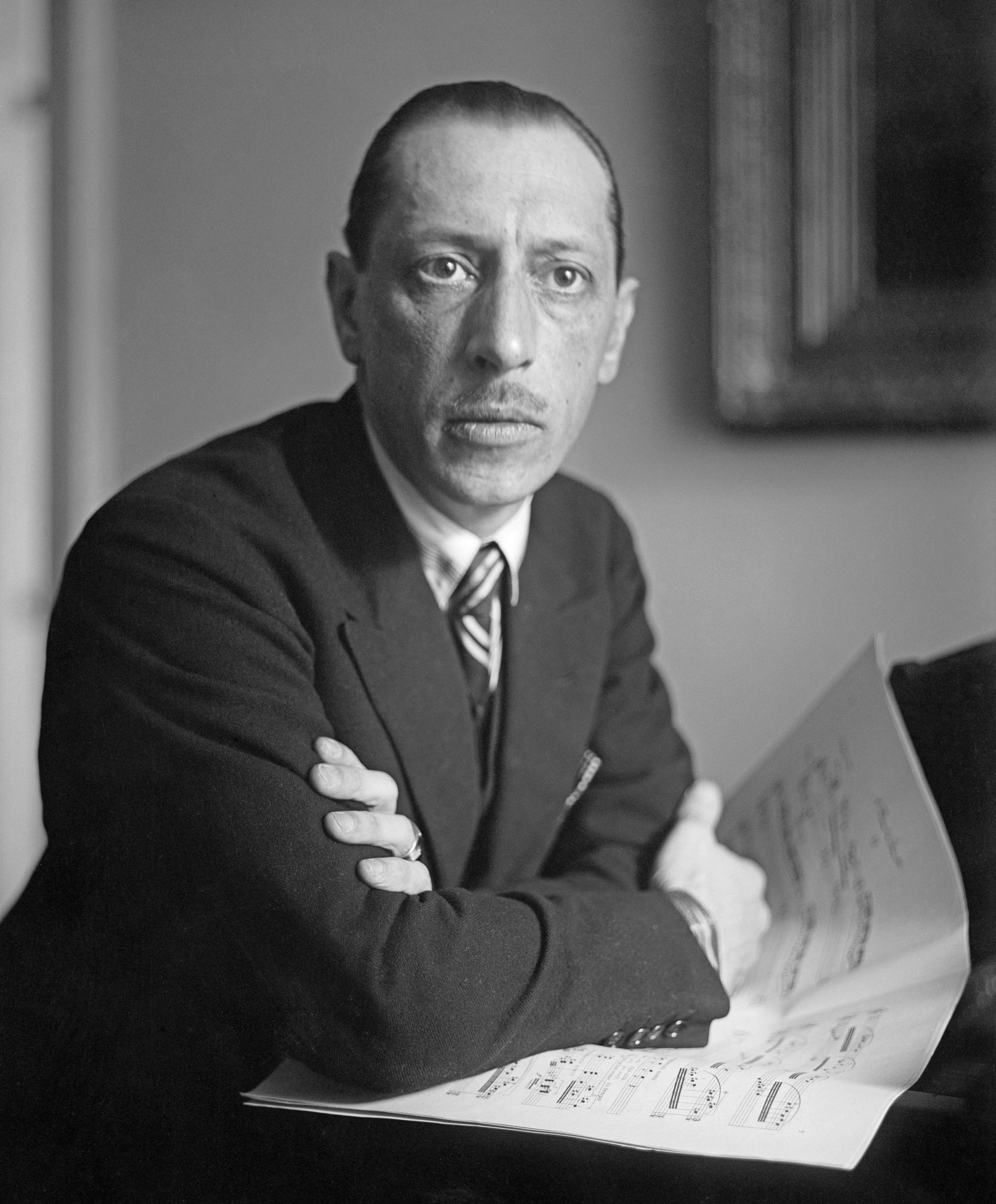
- The composer
- Description: Opera-oratorio
- Librettist: Jean Cocteau
- Language: Latin
- Based on: Sophocles's Oedipus Rex
- Premiere: 30 May 1927; Théâtre Sarah Bernhardt, Paris

Oedipus rex is an opera-oratorio by Igor Stravinsky, scored for orchestra, speaker, soloists, and male chorus. The libretto, based on Sophocles's tragedy, was written by Jean Cocteau in French and then translated by Abbé Jean Daniélou into Latin; the narration, however, is performed in the language of the audience.

Oedipus rex was written towards the beginning of Stravinsky's neoclassical period, and is considered one of the finest works from this phase of the composer's career. He had considered setting the work in Ancient Greek, but decided ultimately on Latin: in his words "a medium not dead but turned to stone".

== Performance history ==
Oedipus rex is sometimes performed in the concert hall as an oratorio, similarly to its original performance in the Théâtre Sarah Bernhardt in Paris on 30 May 1927, and at its American premiere the following year, given by the Boston Symphony Orchestra and the Harvard Glee Club.

It has also been presented on stage as an opera, the first such performance being at the Vienna State Opera on 23 February 1928. It was subsequently presented three times by the Santa Fe Opera in 1960, 1961, and 1962 with the composer in attendance. In January 1962 it was performed in Washington, D.C., by the Opera Society of Washington (now the Washington National Opera) with the composer conducting.

In 1960 at Sadler's Wells Theatre in London, a production by Colin Graham, directed by Michel Saint-Denis, conducted by Colin Davis and designed by Abd'Elkader Farrah. Oedipus was sung by Australian tenor Ronald Dowd with actor Michael Hordern as narrator. Although the performance's narration was in English, the company moved from its normal English-language practice and the singing remained in the original Latin. This was part of a double bill, the second opera being Bartok's Bluebeard's Castle.

A production directed by Julie Taymor starring Philip Langridge, Jessye Norman, Min Tanaka, and Bryn Terfel was performed at the Saito Kinen Festival Matsumoto in Japan in 1992 and filmed by Taymor for television. Another filmed rendition survives from 1973, conducted by Leonard Bernstein during his sixth and last lecture for the Charles Eliot Norton chair at Harvard University.

== Roles ==
Roles, voice types, premiere cast
Role	Voice type	Premiere cast, 30 May 1927 Conductor: Igor Stravinsky
Oedipus, king of Thebes	tenor	Stefan Belina-Skupiewski
Jocasta, his wife & mother	mezzo-soprano	Hélène de Sadowen
Creon, Jocasta's brother	bass-baritone	Georges Lanskoy
Tiresias, soothsayer	bass	Kapiton Zaporojetz
Shepherd	tenor	
Messenger	bass-baritone	Kapiton Zaporojetz
Narrator	speaking role	Pierre Brasseur
Men's chorus

== Instrumentation ==
The work is scored for 3 flutes (3rd doubling piccolo), 2 oboes, English horn, 3 clarinets in B♭ and A (3rd doubling clarinet in E♭), 2 bassoons, contrabassoon, 4 horns in F, 4 trumpets in C, 3 trombones, tuba, timpani, tambourine, "military" snare drum, bass drum, cymbals, piano, harp and strings.

== Synopsis ==
=== Act 1 ===
The Narrator greets the audience, explaining the nature of the drama they are about to see, and setting the scene: Thebes is suffering from a plague, and the men of the city lament it loudly. Oedipus, king of Thebes and conqueror of the Sphinx, promises to save the city. Creon, brother-in-law to Oedipus, returns from the oracle at Delphi and declaims the words of the gods: Thebes is harboring the murderer of Laius, the previous king. It is the murderer who has brought the plague upon the city. Oedipus promises to discover the murderer and cast him out. He questions Tiresias, the soothsayer, who at first refuses to speak. Angered at this silence, Oedipus accuses him of being the murderer himself. Provoked, Tiresias speaks at last, stating that the murderer of the king is a king. Terrified, Oedipus then accuses Tiresias of being in league with Creon, whom he believes covets the throne. With a flourish from the chorus, Oedipus's wife Jocasta appears.

=== Act 2 ===
Jocasta calms the dispute by telling all that the oracles always lie. An oracle had predicted that Laius would die at his son's hand, when in fact he was murdered by bandits at the crossing of three roads. This frightens Oedipus further: he recalls killing an old man at a crossroads before coming to Thebes. A messenger arrives: King Polybus of Corinth, whom Oedipus believes to be his father, has died. However, it is now revealed that Polybus was only the foster-father of Oedipus, who had been, in fact, a foundling. An ancient shepherd arrives: it was he who had found the child Oedipus in the mountains. Jocasta, realizing the truth, flees. At last, the messenger and shepherd state the truth openly: Oedipus is the child of Laius and Jocasta, killer of his father, husband of his mother. Shattered, Oedipus leaves. The messenger reports the death of Jocasta: she has hanged herself in her chambers. Oedipus breaks into her room and puts out his eyes with her pin. He departs Thebes forever as the chorus at first vents their anger, and then mourns the loss of the king they loved.

== Analysis ==
Many insights to this opera are found in Leonard Bernstein's analysis of it in his sixth and last Norton lecture from 1973, "The Poetry of Earth". Bernstein stated that Oedipus rex is the most "awesome product" of Stravinsky's neoclassical period. Much of the music borrows techniques from past classical styles and from popular styles of Stravinsky's day as well. However, Stravinsky deliberately mismatches various subjects in the text – sorrow, drama, romance, pity – with jocular and satirical accompaniment. Bernstein even goes so far as to link the opening four-note motif sung by the chorus to a specific passage in Verdi's Aida. The idea parallel of "power and pity" reigns in both operas even though the specific subject matters are quite different.

== Recordings ==
=== Audio ===
- 1953 – Peter Pears (Oedipus), Martha Mödl (Jocasta), Heinz Rehfuss (Creon/Messenger), Otto von Rohr (Tiresias), Helmut Krebs (Shepherd), Jean Cocteau (Narrator) – Kölner Rundfunk-Sinfonie-Orchester und Chor, Igor Stravinsky (Columbia)
- 1974 – René Kollo (Oedipus), Tatiana Troyanos (Jocasta), Tom Krause (Creon), Ezio Flagello (Tiresias), David Evitts (Messenger), Frank Hoffmeister (Shepherd), Michael Wagner (Narrator) – Harvard Glee Club, Boston Symphony Orchestra, Leonard Bernstein (Columbia)
- 1977 – Peter Pears (Oedipus), Kerstin Meyer (Jocasta), Donald McIntyre (Creon), Stafford Dean (Tiresias), Benjamin Luxon (Messenger), Ryland Davies (Shepherd), Alec McCowen (Narrator) – John Alldis Choir, London Philharmonic Orchestra, Sir Georg Solti (Decca)
- 1983 – Thomas Moser (Oedipus), Jessye Norman (Jocasta), Siegmund Nimsgern (Creon/Messenger), Roland Bracht (Tiresias), Alexandru Ionita (Shepherd) – Chor und Symphonieorchester des Bayerischen Rundfunks, Sir Colin Davis (Orfeo)
- 1993 – Philip Langridge (Oedipus), Florence Quivar (Jocasta), James Morris (Creon/Messenger), Jan-Hendrik Rootering (Tiresias), Donald Kaasch (Shepherd), Jules Bastin (Narrator) – Chicago Symphony Chorus and Orchestra, James Levine (DG)
- 1994 – Peter Schreier (Oedipus), Jessye Norman (Jocasta), Bryn Terfel (Creon), Harry Peeters (Tiresias), Michio Tatara (Messenger), Robert Swensen (Shepherd), Georges Wilson (Narrator) – Shinyukai Male Choir, Saito Kinen Orchestra, Seiji Ozawa (Philips Classics)

=== Video ===
- 1992: Philip Langridge (Oedipus), Jessye Norman (Jocaste), Bryn Terfel (Creon), Min Tanaka (Oedipus Dancer), Kayoko Shiraishi (The Speaker); Saito Kinen Orchestra, Tokyo Opera Singers, Shin-Kai Chorus, and Saito Kinen Festival Dancers, conducted by Seiji Ozawa, staged and filmed by Julie Taymor, produced by Peter Gelb, recorded live, 11 September 1992, Saito Kinen Festival Matsumoto (CAMI Video and NHK)
