= The Burning of the Abominable House =

"The Burning of the Abominable House" (Italian title: L'incendio della casa abominevole) is a short story by the Italian novelist Italo Calvino. It can be considered an experiment of computer-aided literature, where the techniques of combinatorics and constraint-based writing developed by the French writers' gathering Oulipo are applied to the narrative structure rather than just to the syntactic arrangement of a text.

== Story/plot ==
A computer analyst and programmer is hired by an insurance company to reconstitute antecedents and circumstances of a boarding house that has mysteriously burnt to the ground. All four tenants of the house died in the blaze : the Widow Roessler (house owner), her adoptive daughter Ogiva, the young Inigo, and the Uzbek wrestler Belindo Kind. While the police have dismissed the investigation since all the persons involved are dead, the insurance company is determined to investigate the circumstances behind the blaze as each tenant took out life insurance with the company. The only available clue is the charred copybook found in the ruins of the house of which the cover alone has survived. Written on the front is the title, "An Account of the Abominable Deeds Committed in this House" while on the back is an index with twelve entries in alphabetical order:

- Blackmail
- Drugging
- Incitement to Suicide
- Knifing
- Prostitution
- Threatening with a Gun
- Tying and Gagging
- Rape
- Seduction
- Slander
- Snooping
- Strangling

To solve the enigma, the computer programmer approaches it in formal terms: each of the four characters can be at the same time the object and the subject of the 12 possible acts mentioned in the notebook's index. Taken two per time, these can configure 12 different transitive and non-reflexive relations each, resulting in a total of 12 power 12 (874.296.672.256) possible relations. In order to narrow down the number of possible hypotheses, the programmer needs to define a system of filters and selection rules that can allow the computer to automatically exclude those hypotheses that seem to be physically or logically impossible.

== History ==
Oulipo member and ALAMO (Atelier de Littérature Assistée par la Mathématique et les Ordinateurs) founder Paul Braffort explained that Calvino initially published a shorter version of the story in the Italian edition of Playboy magazine in 1973. Calvino later expanded the text with the view to turning it into a novel titled, L’ordre dans le crime (literally "The Order in Crime" and L’ordine del delitto in Italian). Braffort was asked by Calvino to write an editing and filtering program. This collaboration resulted in a presentation made on 15 June 1977 at the "Atelier de Recherches Avancées" at the Pompidou Centre (Centre for Art and Culture) in Paris.
