= Un re in ascolto =

1984 opera by Luciano Berio

- Opera by Luciano Berio
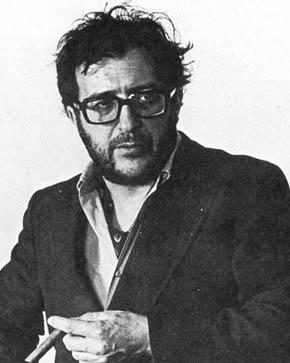
- The composer in the 1970s
- Translation: A King Listens
- Librettist: Berio
- Language: Italian
- Based on: Under the Jaguar Sun by Italo Calvino
- Premiere: 7 August 1984; Kleines Festspielhaus, Salzburg

Un re in ascolto (A King Listens) is an opera by Luciano Berio, who also wrote the Italian libretto. It is based on a short story from the collection Under the Jaguar Sun by Italo Calvino, but incorporates excerpts from Friedrich Einsiedel's 1778 libretto (as reworked by Friedrich Wilhelm Gotter between 1790 and 1791) for an opera based on Shakespeare's The Tempest. This became Die Geisterinsel in 1798, set to music written by Friedrich Fleischmann. (Note: "Mozart was powerfully attracted by it in 1791." However, Mozart died in December of that year.) In addition, W. H. Auden's The Sea and the Mirror: A Commentary on Shakespeare's The Tempest was a source.

Berio himself described the work as an azione musicale (musical action) rather than an opera. It falls into 19 sections grouped into two parts. The work was written from 1981 to 1983 and it received its premiere at the Kleines Festspielhaus in Salzburg on 7 August 1984, conducted by Lorin Maazel, directed by Götz Friedrich, with set designs by Günther Schneider-Siemssen. The London premiere took place on 9 February 1989 at the Royal Opera House, Covent Garden. The American premiere was at Lyric Opera of Chicago on 9 November 1996, conducted by Dennis Russell Davies.

== Roles ==
Roles, voice types, premiere cast
Role	Voice type	Premiere cast, 7 August 1984 Conductor: Lorin Maazel
Prospero, an impresario and the title character	bass-baritone	Theo Adam
Regista (stage director)	tenor	Heinz Zednik
Protagonista	coloratura-soprano	Patricia Wise
	soprano I	Karan Armstrong
	soprano II	Sylvia Greenberg
Venerdì, (Note: Venerdì is Italian for Friday, and refers here to Friday (Robinson Crusoe).) a stand-in for Caliban	speaking role	Helmuth Lohner
Ariel	mime	Samy Molcho
nurse	mezzo-soprano	Gabriela Sima
wife	mezzo-soprano	Anna Gonda

== Synopsis ==
The opera does not have a conventional linear narrative.

A king of a mythical kingdom lives detached from his realm where his only contact with his kingdom is through overhearing conversations. A traveling theatrical troupe arrives to stage a performance of The Tempest. As the king overhears the auditions and the rehearsals, he begins to imagine himself as Prospero from the play and he begins to equate these with the happenings in his kingdom, blurring the two worlds. Eventually, he undergoes a psychological collapse, the rehearsed production of The Tempest never occurs, and the theatrical troupe departs. The king has a vision of the future as he moves towards his own death.

== Publications ==
=== Recording ===
- Berio, Luciano (1997). Un re in ascolto (1981–1983); azione musicale in due parti [A King Listening (1981–1983); musical action in two parts] (in Italian). Theo Adam, Prospero. Heinz Zednik, Regista. Helmuth Lohner, Venerdi. Patricia Wise, Protagonista. Karan Armstrong, Sopran I. Sylvia Greenberg, Sopran II. Rohangiz Yachmi, Mezzosopran. Thomas Moser, Tenor. Georg Tichy, Bariton. Alfred Muff, Baß. Samy Molcho, Mime. Gabriele Sima, Infermiera. Anna Gonda, Moglie. Helmut Wildhaber, Dottore. George Ionescu, Avvocato. Vienna Philharmonic. Lorin Maazel, conductor. Munich: Col-Legno Musikprod. OCLC 1069119146.

=== Libretto ===
- Berio, Luciano; Calvino, Italo (8 August 1984). Un re in ascolto: azione musicale in due parti (PDF) (libretto) (in Italian). Milano: Universal Edition. OCLC 553462036. Archived (PDF) from the original on 24 February 2025.

=== Musical score ===
- Berio, Luciano; Calvino, Italo (1983). Un re in ascolto : azione musicale in due parti (1983). Parte prima (in Italian). Vienna: Universal Edition. OCLC 1231569172.
