= Cosmicomics =

1965 book by Italo Calvino

- First edition (Einaudi, 1965)
- Author: Italo Calvino
- Original title: Le Cosmicomiche
- Translator: William Weaver
- Cover artist: M. C. Escher (depicted); A. Simi (first paper) (Note: The ISFDB lists Escher for the first edition and one US paperback edition, probably 1976; no data for the first US and UK editions; A. Simi for the first paperback edition (1970, US).)
- Language: Italian (first)
- Genre: Science fiction short stories
- Publisher: Giulio Einaudi (Italian); Harcourt Brace (US)
- Publication date: 1965
- Publication place: Italy (first)
- English publication date: 1968 (US, UK)
- Media type: Print (hardback & paperback (1970))
- Pages: 188 (first); 153 (US, UK); 185 (first paper)
- ISBN: 0-15-622600-6 (1976 US)
- OCLC: 2521577
- Dewey Decimal: 853/.9/14
- LC Class: PZ3.C13956 Co8 PQ4809.A45

Cosmicomics (Italian: Le cosmicomiche) is a collection of twelve short stories by Italo Calvino first published in Italian in 1965 and in English in 1968. The stories were originally published between 1964 and 1965 in the Italian periodicals Il Caffè and Il Giorno. Each story takes a scientific theory (some of which have since become deprecated) or phenomenon and builds an imaginative story around it. An always-extant being called Qfwfq explicitly narrates all of the stories save two. Every story is a memory of an event in the history of the universe.

All of the stories in Cosmicomics, together with more of Qfwfq stories from t zero and other sources, are now available in a single volume collection, The Complete Cosmicomics (Penguin UK, 2009).

The first U.S. edition, translated by William Weaver, won the National Book Award in the translation category.

== Contents ==
- "The Distance of the Moon", the first and probably the best known story. Calvino takes the fact that the Moon used to be much closer to the Earth, and builds a story about a love triangle among people who used to jump between the Earth and the Moon; the lovers gradually drift apart as the Moon recedes.
- "At Daybreak": Life in a nebula before gas condenses into solid matter, a process which ultimately leads to the formation of solar systems.
- "A Sign in Space": The fact that the galaxy slowly revolves is the premise of a story about a being desperate to leave behind some unique sign of its existence. This story is a direct illustration of one of the tenets of postmodern theory—that the sign is not the thing it signifies, nor can one claim to fully or properly describe a thing or an idea with a word or other symbol.
- "All at One Point": The fact that before the Big Bang the cosmos existed as a single point (the initial singularity. "Naturally, we were all there—old Qfwfq said—where else could we have been? Nobody knew then that there could be space. Or time, either: what use did we have for time, packed in there like sardines?"
- "Without Colors": Before there was an atmosphere, everything was the same shade of gray. As the atmosphere gradually appears, so do colors. Unfortunately the novelty scares off Ayl, Qfwfq's love interest.
- "Games Without End": A galactic game of marbles played using hydrogen atoms, before the universe had created other materials.
- "The Aquatic Uncle": A tale on the fact that at one stage in evolution animals left the sea and came to live on land. The story is about a family living on land that is a bit ashamed of their old uncle who still lives in the sea, refusing to come ashore like "civilized" people.
- "How Much Shall We Bet": Qfwfq bets against his rival Dean (k)yK about the universe's transformations, making increasingly long-term and specific conjectures.
- "The Dinosaurs": How some dinosaurs lived after most of them had become extinct, and how it felt to be that last existing dinosaur in an age where all the current mammals feared his kind as demons.
- "The Form of Space": As the unnamed narrator "falls" through space, he cannot help noticing that his trajectory is parallel to that of a beautiful woman, Ursula H'x, and that of lieutenant Fenimore, who is also in love with Ursula. The narrator dreams of the shape of space changing, so that he may touch Ursula (or fight with Fenimore).
- "The Light Years": The unnamed narrator looking at other galaxies spots one with a sign pointed right at him saying "I saw you." Given that there's a gulf of 100,000,000 light years, he checks his diary to find out what he had been doing that day eons ago, and finds out that it was something he had wished to hide. He then starts to worry.
- "The Spiral": A story about life as a mollusc who creates the first shell. By creating this object of beauty to behold, he enables the development of vision in other creatures and sets off a chain reaction leading to the present day.

All of the stories feature non-human characters who have been heavily anthropomorphized.

== Adaptations ==
"La Luna" by Enrico Casarosa, 2011 is a short film based on the same premise as "The Distance of the Moon."
