= Under the Jaguar Sun =

1986 short story collection by Italo Calvino

Under the Jaguar Sun is a collection of three short stories by Italo Calvino. The stories were to have been in a book entitled I cinque sensi (The Five Senses). Calvino died before writing the stories dedicated to vision and touch. In the Italian edition (Garzanti, 1986) the stories are ordered as follows: Il nome, il naso; Sotto il sole giaguaro; and Un re in ascolto. The titular story Sotto il sole giaguaro was originally published as Sapore sapere ("learning to taste") in the June 1982 edition of FMR, an Italian magazine.

In the 1988 English translation by William Weaver, the works are arranged by length, beginning with "Under the Jaguar Sun" followed by "A King Listens" and lastly "The Name, The Nose."

According to the Kindle edition, Under the Jaguar Sun was first published as The Jaguar Sun in the New Yorker, translation copyright 1983 by Harcourt, Inc. The Name, the Nose was first published in Antaeus, translation copyright 1976 by Harcourt, Inc. It states that the English language copyright is 1988 by Harcourt, Inc.

Sotto il sole giaguaro involves a couple on vacation in Mexico, experiencing difficulties in their relationship. Mexico is presented as a country characterised by its bloody history, both in the indigenous past and in its colonised period, which includes the present. The sense of taste is explored in this story, and used by the couple as a substitute for sex. As they travel tasting different dishes, they stumble upon an old secret of the ancient cuisine that may prove to be cannibalistic.

== A King Listens ==
Un re in ascolto focuses on the sense of hearing. It is written in the second-person. In the story, a palace becomes a giant ear and a King is obsessed by fears of rebellion which send him toward a state of restless aural surveillance. This paranoia only seems to halt when he hears the sincere love song of a woman. The story was made into an eponymous opera work by the composer Luciano Berio, and served as basis for Myriorama (2004), a telematic dance piece by ambientTV.NET in collaboration with kondition pluriel, which questioned surveillance of daily life through networked telecommunication technologies.

== The Name, the Nose ==
Il nome, il naso is told from the perspective of three different characters: a French sensualist, a prehistoric entity on the verge of becoming human, and a drug-addled musician. They are united in their quest of a captivating female scent, which in the end is revealed to be death.

== Bibliography ==
- Calvino, Italo. Sotto il sole giaguaro. Milano: Garzanti, 1986.
- —. Under the Jaguar Sun. Translated by William Weaver. London: Vintage, 1993.
