= If on a winter's night a traveler =

1979 novel by Italo Calvino

- First edition (publ. Einaudi, Turin)
- Author: Italo Calvino
- Original title: Se una notte d'inverno un viaggiatore
- Translator: William Weaver
- Cover artist: Dominique Appia
- Language: Italian
- Genre: Postmodernist novel
- Publisher: Einaudi
- Publication date: 1979
- Publication place: Italy
- English publication date: 1981
- ISBN: 9788806491307
- OCLC: 777233785
- Dewey Decimal: 853.914
- LC Class: PQ4809.A45 S3713
- Preceded by: Invisible Cities
- Followed by: Mr. Palomar

If on a winter's night a traveler (Italian: Se una notte d'inverno un viaggiatore) is a 1979 postmodern novel by the Italian writer Italo Calvino. The narrative, in the form of a frame story, is about the reader trying to read a book of the same title. Each chapter (except for the last one) is divided into two sections. The first section of each chapter is in second person ("you"), and describes the process the reader goes through to attempt to acquire and read the next chapter of the book they are reading. The second half comprises the opening chapter of a completely different book that the reader finds, usually with a very different plot and style. The book was published in an English translation by William Weaver in 1981.

== Structure ==
The book begins with a chapter on the art and nature of reading, and is subsequently divided into twenty-two passages. The odd-numbered passages and the final passage are narrated in the second person. That is, they concern events purportedly happening to the novel's reader. (Some contain further discussions about whether the person narrated as "you" is the same as the "you" who is actually reading.) These chapters concern the reader's adventures in reading Italo Calvino's novel, If on a winter's night a traveler. Eventually the reader meets a woman named Ludmilla, who is also addressed in her own chapter, separately, and also in the second person.

Alternating between second-person narrative chapters of this story are the remaining (even) passages, each of which is a first chapter in ten different novels, of widely varying style, genre, and subject-matter. All are broken off, for various reasons explained in the interspersed passages, most of them at some moment of plot climax.

The second-person narrative passages develop into a fairly cohesive novel that puts its two protagonists on the track of an international book-fraud conspiracy, a mischievous translator, a reclusive novelist haunted by advertisers who wish to embed products in his stories and programmers who demand to let a computer generate the conclusion to his unfinished novels, a collapsing publishing house, and several repressive governments.

The chapters, which are the first chapters of different books, all push the narrative chapters along. Themes which are introduced in each of the first chapters will then exist in succeeding narrative chapters. For example, after reading the first chapter of a detective novel, the narrative story takes on a few common detective-style themes. There are also phrases and descriptions that are similar between the narrative and the new stories.

When the titles of the fragmentary fictions are read in order—as they are by a character near the end of the narrative—they form a sentence:

If on a winter's night a traveler, outside the town of Malbork, leaning from the steep slope without fear of wind or vertigo, looks down in the gathering shadow in a network of lines that enlace, in a network of lines that intersect, on the carpet of leaves illuminated by the moon around an empty grave— What story down there awaits its end?—he asks, anxious to hear the story.

The theme of a writer's objectivity appears also in Calvino's novel Mr. Palomar, which explores if absolute objectivity is possible, or even agreeable. Other themes include the subjectivity of meaning, the relationship between fiction and life, what makes an ideal reader and author, and authorial originality.

=== Cimmeria ===
Cimmeria is a fictional country in the novel. The country is described as having existed as an independent state between World War I and World War II. The capital is Örkko, and its principal resources are peat and by-products, bituminous compounds. Cimmeria seems to have been located somewhere on the Gulf of Bothnia, a body of water between Sweden to the west and Finland to the east. The country has since been absorbed, and its people and language, of the 'Bothno-Ugaric' group, have both disappeared. As Calvino concludes the alleged, fictional encyclopedia entry concerning Cimmeria: "In successive territorial divisions between her powerful neighbors the young nation was soon erased from the map; the autochthonous population was dispersed; Cimmerian language and culture had no development".

The pair of chapters following the two on Cimmeria and its literature are followed by one describing another fictional country called the Cimbrian People's Republic, which allegedly absorbed Cimmeria after World War II.

== Characters ==
The main character in the first part of each chapter is you, the reader. The narrative starts out when you begin reading a book but then all of the pages are out of order. You then go to a bookstore to get a new copy of the book. When at the bookstore, you meet a girl, Ludmilla, who becomes an important character in the book. You think Ludmilla is beautiful, and you both share a love of books. Throughout the rest of the narrative, you and Ludmilla develop a relationship while on the quest for the rest of the book you had started reading. There are a number of minor characters that appear at various points in the story including Lotaria (Ludmilla's sister), Ermes Marana (a translation scammer), and Silas Flannery (an author).

== Influences ==
In a 1985 interview with Gregory Lucente, Calvino stated If on a winter's night a traveler was "clearly" influenced by the writings of Vladimir Nabokov. The book was also influenced by the author's membership in the literary group Oulipo. The structure of the text is said to be an adaptation of the structural semiology of A. J. Greimas.

In a letter written to critic Lucio Lombardo Radice dated November 13, 1979 (published in Italo Calvino: letters, 1941–1985), Calvino mentions Mikhail Bulgakov, Yasunari Kawabata, Jun'ichirō Tanizaki, Juan Rulfo, José María Arguedas, Jorge Luis Borges and G. K. Chesterton as having influenced, in various ways, the narrative style of the ten stories that comprise the book.

== Legacy and opinion ==
Dave Langford reviewed If on a winter's night a traveler for White Dwarf #45, and declared it "a splendidly batty book about books. [...] Offbeat and fun."

The Telegraph included the novel in 69th place in a list of "100 novels everyone should read" in 2009, describing it as a "playful postmodernist puzzle".

Author David Mitchell described himself as being "magnetised" by the book from its start when he read it as an undergraduate, but on rereading it, felt it had aged and that he did not find it "breathtakingly inventive" as he had the first time, yet does stress that "however breathtakingly inventive a book is, it is only breathtakingly inventive once. But once is better than never." The structure of his own novel Cloud Atlas was inspired by If on a winter's night a traveler.

Novelist and lecturer Scarlett Thomas uses it to teach innovative contemporary fiction, as an example of different kinds of narrative techniques.

Sting named his 2009 album If on a Winter's Night... after the book.

English musician and composer Bill Ryder-Jones released the album If... on 14 November 2011. The album is a musical adaptation of the book and serves as an "imaginary film score".

In 2021, Laura Hunt and Thomas Möhring released, as Dead Idle Games, the point-and-click adventure game If On A Winter's Night, Four Travelers, whose title alludes to Calvino's novel; PC Gamer described it as "a narrative experiment that delves into the art of storytelling" like its "literary namesake".

A radio adaptation of the book starring Toby Jones, Indira Varma and Tim Crouch was recorded as part of BBC's 100 years of Radio Drama Celebrations and broadcast on BBC Radio 4 on 24 September 2023.

== See also ==
- Cimmerians
- One Thousand and One Nights
- Pale Fire
- "Pierre Menard, Author of the Quixote"
- Self-reference
