= Martin McLaughlin (academic) =

British literary historian (1950–2025)

Martin L. McLaughlin was Professor of Italian and Agnelli-Serena Professor of Italian Studies in the Faculty of Medieval and Modern Languages, University of Oxford from 2001 to 2017 where he was also a Fellow of Magdalen College. He published academic papers and is the English translator of Umberto Eco's On Literature and Italo Calvino's Hermit in Paris. He died on 24 January 2025.

== Academic research ==
McLaughlin's research interests include Italian Renaissance literature, Renaissance humanism, Renaissance literary theory, Renaissance biography, Alberti, Petrarch, Poliziano, Tasso, the classical legacy in Italian literature, contemporary Italian Fiction, Italo Calvino, Andrea De Carlo, and translation studies. He taught Italian language and literature, especially Dante, Renaissance literature from Petrarch to Tasso, post-war fiction especially Calvino, the Italian short story, and translation studies.

== Published works ==
- Literary Imitation in the Italian Renaissance, Oxford Modern Language and Literature Monographs (London: Clarendon Press, 1995)
- Italo Calvino, Writers of Italy (Edinburgh University Press, 1998)
- Leon Battista Alberti: Writer and Humanist (Princeton, 2024)
- Translator, Italo Calvino, The Path to the Spider's Nest (London: HarperCollins, 1998)
- Translator, Italo Calvino, Why Read The Classics? (London: Cape, 1999)
- Editor, Britain and Italy from Romanticism to Modernism: A Festschrift for Peter Brand (Oxford: Legenda, 2000)
- Translator, Italo Calvino, Hermit in Paris. Autobiographical Writings (London: Cape, 2003)
- Translator, Umberto Eco, On Literature (London: Secker & Warburg, 2005)
- Editor, with Peter Hainsworth, Biographies and Autobiographies in Modern Italy (Oxford: Legenda, 2007)
- Editor, with Birgitte Grundtvig and Lene Waage Petersen, 'Image, Eye and Art' in Calvino: Writing Visibility (Oxford: Legenda, 2007)
- Editor, with Letizia Panizza and Peter Hainsworth, Petrarch in Britain: Interpreters, Imitators, and Translators Over 700 Years (Oxford University Press, 2007)
- Editor, with Michelangelo Zaccarello, Dante in Oxford: The Paget Toynbee Lectures 1995-2005 (Oxford: Legenda, April 2008)
