= The Path to the Nest of Spiders =

1947 novel by Italo Calvino

- First edition (Italian)
- Author: Italo Calvino
- Original title: Il sentiero dei nidi di ragno
- Translator: Archibald Colquhoun
- Language: Italian
- Publication date: 1947
- Publication place: Italy
- English publication date: 1957

The Path to the Nest of Spiders (Italian: Il sentiero dei nidi di ragno) is a 1947 novel by the Italian writer Italo Calvino. The narrative is a coming-of-age story, set against the backdrop of World War II. It was Calvino's first novel.

== Plot ==
Pin, an orphaned cobbler's apprentice in a town on the Ligurian coast, lives with his sister, a prostitute and spends as much time as he can at a bar where he amuses the adult patrons. After stealing a pistol from a Nazi sailor, Pin searches for an identity with an Italian partisan group. All the while, the people he meets mock him without his knowing. The title refers to Pin's secret hiding place, directions to which he touts as a prize to any adults who win his trust.

== See also ==
- 1947 in literature
- Italian literature
