= The Unanswered Question (lecture series) =

Lectures series on music and theory given by Leonard Bernstein

The Unanswered Question is a lecture series given by Leonard Bernstein in the fall of 1973. This series of six lectures was a component of Bernstein's duties as the Charles Eliot Norton Professor of Poetry for the 1972/73 academic year at Harvard University, and is therefore often referred to as the Norton Lectures. The lectures were both recorded on video and printed as a book, titled The Unanswered Question: Six Talks at Harvard.

== Background ==
During his year as visiting professor at Harvard University, Leonard Bernstein had various duties, such as being in residence and advising students, but historically the most significant of these was to deliver a series of lectures. This series comprised six lectures on music, which cumulatively took the title of a work by Charles Ives, The Unanswered Question. Bernstein drew analogies to other disciplines, such as poetry, aesthetics, and especially linguistics, hoping to make these lectures accessible to an audience with limited or no musical experience, while maintaining an intelligent level of discourse.

As the lectures were postponed from the spring semester of 1973 to the fall semester of the same year, Bernstein's visiting professorship lasted three semesters instead of the intended year. Several factors contributed to the postponement. First, having attended Harvard as an undergraduate himself – a point he stresses heavily in his first lecture – and following such renowned lecturers as Stravinsky, Copland, and Hindemith, the task at hand seemed monumental. His daughter, Jamie Bernstein, later recounted: "Ambitious? Oh, yes! Was he in over his head? Completely!" Second, Bernstein had accepted commissions in addition to the Norton Lectures, including those of Dybbuk and 1600 Pennsylvania Avenue, which distracted him greatly from his work at Harvard. And third, Humphrey Burton, Bernstein's leading biographer, adds Bernstein had too much fun pretending to be a student again. With the help of Mary Ahern, Thomas Cothran, and members of the Harvard Staff, Bernstein finally completed the script by October 1973.

Burton stresses that, by this point in his life, Bernstein wanted all of his work to be documented for pedagogical purposes. His desire to share with his own generation as well as future ones seems to have been the impetus for meticulously filming these lectures, which otherwise could not have been broadcast on television or sold on videocassette. Bernstein was, however, not alone in the arrangements to promote his career and legacy through these lectures. In 1971, Harry Kraut began working for Bernstein, taking responsibility for much of the business side accompanying Bernstein's career. Kraut organized a dissemination strategy that included all possible formats: the published lecture transcripts, the television airing, and the videocassettes. This strategy required extensive planning because the lectures were recorded off-site, at WGBH, immediately following the lecture at Harvard Square Theater. Most of the orchestral examples were recorded in advance, in December 1972, with the Boston Symphony Orchestra. Bernstein provided much of the funding for this elaborate project himself.

=== Linguistic context ===
Although these are lectures about music, Bernstein framed them as interdisciplinary, or as he says, "in the spirit of cross-disciplines" (p. 3). He justifies this interdisciplinary strategy by saying that "...the best way to 'know' a thing is in the context of another discipline", a lesson he proudly attributes to his days as a Harvard student.

As the primary interdisciplinary subject, Bernstein chose the recent work of Noam Chomsky. Chomsky's major contribution at the time was challenging structural linguistics, or structuralism, for failing to account for the ways in which sentences could be radically transformed while minimally changing meaning or how they could be minimally transformed while radically changing meaning. Chomsky advocated generative linguistics, which is characterized by a subconscious, finite set of rules that can account for all grammatically correct linguistic transformations. Chomsky argued that all humans possess an innate grammatical competence, which enables children to construct grammatically correct sentences they may have never previously heard.

Bernstein acknowledges Chomsky was not the only prominent linguist with new theories worth considering within the context of music, but he chose Chomsky because he was "the best-known, most revolutionary, and best-publicized name in the area" (p. 8).

=== Theoretical context ===
"The purpose of these six lectures is not so much to answer the question as to understand it, to redefine it. Even to guess at the answer to 'whither music?' we must first ask whence music? what music? and whose music?" (p. 5) Essentially, the purpose of this lecture series was to discuss the future of classical music.

His inspiration for the series' title came from Ives' 1908 work, The Unanswered Question. Bernstein interprets Ives' piece as posing the question, "whither music?" because of the tonal language and increasingly dissonant nature of music at the time it was written.

These lectures are a useful artifact for us to see one side of the music theory debate in the mid-twentieth century. This debate regarded the future of classical music and the roles both tonality and twelve-tone writing would take. Bernstein was disappointed with the trajectory of classical music in the 1960s, as atonality took more precedence. To examine how music got to this point, Bernstein argued that we have to understand "whence music". By the time he gave the lectures, however, he was more optimistic about the future of music, with the rise of minimalism and neoromanticism as predominantly tonal styles. Encouraged by the progress of tonality's resurgence, Bernstein, in essence, uses these lectures to argue in favor of continuing the tonal music system through eclecticism and neoclassicism.

Many composers in the mid-twentieth century converted from serialism to tonality and vice versa. Bernstein's compositions are rooted firmly in tonality, but he felt that, in order to be taken seriously, he had to draw on serial techniques. He credits this to eclecticism, which he argues is a superb twentieth century innovation and an ideal direction for music to take into the future.

== Content ==
To answer the question, "Whither music?" the first three lectures are based on the question, "Whence music?" These lectures provide background about the history of music, and most of the analogies to linguistics are created during these segments. With the deployment of the linguistic connections as the series progresses, the lectures begin to feature listening examples more prominently. This is especially evident in the increasing frequency of full movements, and the increasing length of the lectures. Lectures 4 and 5 discuss the current state of classical music through the lenses of Arnold Schoenberg and Igor Stravinsky. Lecture 6 discusses the potential future directions music can, and should, take.

=== Lecture 1, "Musical Phonology" ===
Phonology is the linguistic study of sounds, or phonemes. Bernstein's application of this term to music results in what he calls "musical phonology",

To describe musical phonology, Bernstein first explores monogenesis, the hypothesis of a single, common origin for all languages. Bernstein's linguistic example for this is the prevalence of the sound "AH" (p. 11). He makes a case for musical monogenesis through the use of the harmonic series.

Bernstein uses a low C as an example to show how a note contains overtones, or higher pitches that sound simultaneously. Using this concept, he relates the harmonic series to tonality in several ways. First, he notes the relationship of the fundamental pitch, in this case a C, and its second overtone, in this case a G (the first overtone is an octave). These pitches make up the tonic-dominant relationship fundamental to the system of tonal music. Continuing to identify the overtones, he points out that the fourth overtone, the next pitch whose class differs from that of the fundamental, is two octaves plus a major third above the fundamental. The overtones C, G, and E comprise a major triad. Moving on to later overtones, A (it's actually somewhere between a well-tempered A and B-flat, but A is the usual choice), he constructs a major pentatonic scale.

This scientific aspect of pitches, Bernstein says, makes music universal, or a "substantive universal" (p. 27). Although he still supports the idea of musical monogenesis, he identifies Chomsky's innate grammatical competence as a theory especially applicable to music.

Bernstein justifies the remaining notes of tonal music through the circle of fifths (p. 37). Here he introduces the balance between diatonicism and chromaticism, diatonic notes being those found lower in the harmonic series of the specific key area. The notes higher in the series add ambiguity, or expressiveness, but do so at the loss of clarity.

Bernstein uses Mozart's Symphony No. 40 to illustrate these harmonic implications. He points out several particularly chromatic passages before playing his recording of the piece with the Boston Symphony Orchestra.

While his overview of the harmonic series is a thorough and understandable introduction for those unfamiliar with the concept, Bernstein distorts some of the intricacies slightly. His discussion of Non-Western music is rather limited in its understanding of non-tonal language. For instance, the use of a Balinese pentatonic scale for supporting evidence does not accurately reflect Balinese music. As Keiler points out, "there is absolutely no relationship of intervallic content between [the Balinese] scale and the overtone series." Finally, the term monogenesis is slightly misapplied. A common origin for all languages means that a single language emerged before populations spread, after which diversity among languages arose. Polygenesis, in contrast, states that languages spontaneously arose in different places at once, which seems to be closer to Bernstein's hypotheses for musical origin. Arguing that the harmonic series is a universal truth, independently discovered by all musical cultures, would actually be polygenesis.

=== Lecture 2, "Musical Syntax" ===
Syntax refers to the study of the structural organization of a sentence, or as Bernstein summarizes, "the actual structures that arise from that phonological stuff" (p. 9). In addition to syntax, lecture 2 relies on Chomsky's theory of universal grammar, which states that innate mental processes take place to transform sounds and words into meaningful structures. The theory seeks to explain the transformational processes small units of language take to become larger structures. Grammar is a key aspect in this process, because through the use of underlying grammatical rules, the mind is capable of combining phonemes into syntax. These resulting syntactic structures include linguistic material such as words, clauses, and sentences.

The transformational process can be represented by a transformation from deep structure to surface structure. Deep structure comprises underlying phonemes and word parts, while surface structure is the spoken sentence.

To demonstrate the innovations transformational grammar has provided linguistics, Bernstein diagrams the sentence "Jack loves Jill" (p. 67). The diagram shows the underlying processes transforming the bottom row, or deep structure, into the spoken words, or surface structure.

Although this transformation is innate, it requires many complex subtleties of language. Examples of transformational processes in language include passive transformation, negative transformation, interrogative transformation, and pronominal substitution.

Bernstein extends deep structure and surface structure analogies to music. He explains that deep structure is musical prose (p. 85), or an unartistic version of music. This musical prose is constructed out of the "underlying strings", which include "melodic motives and phrases, chordal progressions, rhythmic figures, etc". Surface structure, in contrast, is the actual music.

Transformational processes in music are the steps which composers take from deep structure to surface structure. Some of these processes include transpositions, augmentation, deletion, and embedding; he describes them in terms of manipulating melodic material. Ambiguity becomes a more significant theme as Bernstein discusses transformational processes' ability to add ambiguity, and therefore heighten expressiveness.

In terms of transformational processes, Bernstein focuses predominantly on the process of deletion; to demonstrate this process, Bernstein extends several different examples from language, poetry, and music. Turning Mozart's Symphony No. 40 into a poetically balanced piece means adding ambiguity, and in particular, utilizing the process of deletion. He rewrites some of Mozart's music to show the process of deletion when repeating phrases. He expands the first 21 measures into a rambling 36 measures, which he calls "a perfect nightmare of symmetry" (p. 95). This shows the transformative processes to travel from deep structure to surface structure, or music. Then he discusses the hypermeter of this symphony, assigning measures either a strong or weak designation, which prevails despite Mozart's deletion.

Because language has literal meaning, in addition to a potential aesthetic one, the comparison of surface structures between language and music cannot appropriately apply. Bernstein, therefore, invents a new level for a more complete analogy, called the supra-surface structure. This level applies to poetry in order to serve as a more appropriate aesthetic analogy to music (p. 85).

Bernstein's description of deep structure is slightly inconsistent in this chapter. In the linguistic analogies (pp. 84–85), he clearly establishes that deep structure and musical prose will be used as synonyms; "musical prose" merely adds a musical designation rather than linguistic. The material under musical deep structure – or building blocks of deep structure – consists of underlying strings. Bernstein says these underlying strings "can be manipulated by transformations such as repositioning and permutation into... musical prose". This contradicts with his introduction to musical deep structure on page 81: "Musical prose, if it can be described at all, is underlying elements combined into strings, raw material waiting to be transformed into art." There is no distinction, therefore, between these two levels of musical transformations, and this discrepancy makes Bernstein's description in this lecture difficult to follow.

=== Lecture 3, "Musical Semantics" ===
Semantics is the study of meaning in language, and Bernstein's third lecture, "musical semantics", accordingly, is Bernstein's first attempt to explain meaning in music. Although Bernstein defines musical semantics as "meaning, both musical and extramusical" (p. 9) this lecture focuses exclusively on the "musical" version of meaning. The following lectures will examine extramusical associations more extensively.

Bernstein proposes that the meaning of music is metaphorical. A metaphor is a statement equating two unlike things, or "this equals that" (p. 123). Bernstein's recurring example for metaphor is the sentence, "Juliet is the sun." He creates an unabridged sentence to explain this metaphor: "The human being called Juliet is like a star called the Sun in respect to radiance" (p. 124). Through the process of deletion, he arrives at the original statement, "Juliet is the sun." Bernstein identifies metaphors, and thus deletion, as a source of beauty.

Transformations in music involve somehow changing a melodic pattern in a variety of ways. To better understand musical metaphors, he examines two main types of metaphor found in music. The first type is "intrinsic", where the metaphor is constructed by altering musical material into new musical material, as discussed in Lecture 2. This includes "Chomskian transformations", such as augmentation, transposition, diminution, inversion, etc. The second metaphor is "extrinsic" which includes "nonmusical meaning" (p. 133). This metaphor involves the association of a musical passage with extra-musical ideas, such as animals, emotions, or landscapes.

With an awareness of the difference between these two types of metaphor, he asks the audience to focus only on intrinsic metaphors for the moment, or in other words, avoiding extramusical associations. He challenges the audience to hear Beethoven's Symphony No. 6, subtitled Pastorale, not as a musical depiction of nature/extrinsic metaphor, but as continuous transformations of musical material, an intrinsic metaphor. He analyzes the opening of the symphony in detail to explain the many ways in which Beethoven manipulates the first theme to spin out the next few phrases.

The concept of immediate perception of every musical metaphor is a problematic theory on Bernstein's part. Discussing the continuously overlapping metaphors, Bernstein says, "...with all this to be perceived... we still don't require even that one millisecond before perceiving it" (p. 127). With countless overlapping and simultaneous metaphors, Bernstein argues that one hearing of the music alone is sufficient information to perceive all of them, and thus all humans can innately understand music. Obviously, this perception must happen subconsciously, because few could point out the metaphors individually, but surely many of these metaphors in music pass by undetected.

=== Lecture 4, "The Delights and Dangers of Ambiguity" ===
Bernstein provides two distinct meanings of the term ambiguity. The first is "doubtful or uncertain" and the second, "capable of being understood in two or more possible senses" (p. 195). In terms of musical ambiguity, Bernstein discusses ambiguity predominantly in terms of tonality and increasing chromaticism. He traces the use of tonality through Berlioz, Wagner, and Debussy, focusing on the new ways in which composers obscured tonality and how these modifications ultimately affected ambiguity.

In part one of this lecture, Bernstein names three different types of musical ambiguity: (1) phonological ambiguity, or uncertainty of the key, (2) syntactic ambiguity, or uncertainty of meter, and (3) semantic ambiguity, or uncertainty of the meaning. Beethoven's sixth symphony represents a semantic ambiguity, because it could mean either the musical notes performed or the extramusical associations of a pastoral (pp. 199–201).

Finally, Bernstein discusses Berlioz's Roméo et Juliette, paying particular attention to the programmatic element of Berlioz's music (pp. 217–225). He details Berlioz's depiction of the balcony scene, using musical ambiguity to identify extrinsic metaphors, such as the contrast between music depicting the dance and Romeo's "lovesick sighs" (p. 219). The key is another example of ambiguity, because it ambles between two different key areas as Romeo deliberates about a decision (p. 221).

In part 2 of this lecture, Bernstein examines Wagner's Tristan und Isolde in terms of its similarities to and increase of ambiguity from Berlioz's Roméo et Juliette. Wagner's work is a metaphor for Berlioz's for several reasons beyond the choice of similar plots; therefore Bernstein examines three significant transformations within Tristan to show how the work can be viewed as a rewriting of Berlioz's piece. A phonological transformation occurs through increased chromaticism, including ambiguous key areas, ambiguous chords, and chromatic melodies. Next, a syntactic transformation heightens metrical ambiguity through the loss of a pulse and clear rhythmic distinctions (p. 235). Lastly, Tristan's semantic transformation, or "its true semantic quality" is Wagner's strong reliance upon musical metaphor. The piece "is one long series of infinitely slow transformations, metaphor upon metaphor, from the mysterious first phrase through to the climactic heights of passion or of transfiguration, right to the end" (p. 237).

Bernstein indicates that the phonological transformation, or the extreme chromaticism of Tristan, is at a breaking point for tonality, so part 3 examines the next step in twentieth-century ambiguity: atonality. Bernstein begins the foray into atonality with Debussy's Prélude à l'après-midi d'un faune. This work uses a whole-tone scale, which is atonal but entails sufficient unambiguous containment, according to Bernstein.

In his analysis, Bernstein commends the use of atonality in Afternoon of a Faun partially because of the presence of tonality. Bernstein notes, "throughout its course it is constantly referring to, reverting to, or flirting with E major" and "the ending of this piece finally confirms that it was all conceived in the key of E major, right from the beginning" (p. 245). Similar to the serial passages in his own third symphony and his admiration of Ives' The Unanswered Question, Bernstein's lauding of these works stems not from the use of atonality, but the presence of tonality.

In this lecture, some issues arise in the description of Wagner's transformational skills. Again, Bernstein's definition of deep structure is inconsistently applied, because example number 77 on page 236 is not a deep structure. This does not fulfill deep structure's requirement of containing musical prose. Instead, these five or six notes could be more accurately described as the underlying elements composers chose before constructing deep structure. In addition, the transformative processes he demonstrates with this example are not entirely clear, because he takes a few liberties with note alterations which are not explained.

=== Lecture 5, "The Twentieth Century Crisis" ===
Lecture 5 picks up at the early twentieth century with an oncoming crisis in Western Music. As these lectures have traced the gradual increase and oversaturation of ambiguity, Bernstein now designates a point in history that took ambiguity too far. Twelve-tone music emerges as one potential solution to the crisis, but Bernstein considers this idiom so ambiguous that it destroys the all-important balance between clarity and ambiguity.

He takes issue with the increasing preference among composers for twelve-tone music, because even though at its core it rejects tonality, twelve-tone is nonetheless unquestionably tied to the tonal system. This unintended connection to tonality can be explained by the harmonic series and musical phonology.

First of all, tonality is innate, and twelve-tone music systematically fights with this innate process. Overtones are present whether the music is tonal or twelve-tone, so the importance of a perfect fifth within the overtone series, and by extension, the circle of fifths, is contrary to twelve-tone writing. Also, because of the natural hierarchy of musical pitches, truly equalizing all notes is impossible. As long as the composer is working within the Western Music tradition of twelve notes per octave, tonal relationships still exist. Despite the attempt at establishing a new organization of pitches, composers will inevitably write with tonal implications.

In order to see how composers dealt with the twentieth century crisis, Bernstein discusses two composers, Igor Stravinsky and Arnold Schoenberg. He sets up the dichotomy by referencing Theodor Adorno's statements in The Philosophy of Modern Music about the superiority of Schoenberg's music and the inferiority of Stravinsky's.

Bernstein uses Alban Berg as an example of twelve-tone writing which he designates as successful, namely the violin concerto. The row itself simulates traditional tonality slightly, so by acknowledging the presence of inevitable tonal hierarchies, Berg's work is more effective than other twelve-tone pieces. This piece, like several of Bernstein's other favorite pieces, ends on a tonal chord, B-flat major.

Part 2 of this lecture focuses on Mahler. After introducing Mahler's prophetic skills, Bernstein presents his ninth symphony as a death march for tonality. He plays the Adagio from this work, and instead of listening for intrinsic musical meanings as he did in previous lectures, he assigns an extrinsic meaning, the metaphor of death. Instead of the previously established format based on meticulous analysis, this section is purely an emotional appeal. This format is not consistent with the "quasi-scientific" approach taken thus far. The incorporation of opinion, however, may be significant, as they serve as a glimpse into Bernstein's opinions about Mahler, a composer he championed throughout his career.

A noteworthy aspect of this lecture is the first hearing of Charles Ives's The Unanswered Question. Bernstein moderates his interpretation over the music in order to depict the ultimate triumph of tonality, represented by a held G major chord in the strings, held "into eternity".

=== Lecture 6, "The Poetry of Earth" ===
This lecture takes its name from a line in John Keats' poem, "On the Grasshopper and Cricket". Bernstein does not discuss Keats' poem directly in this chapter, but he provides his own definition of the poetry of earth, which is tonality. Tonality is the poetry of earth because of the phonological universals discussed in lecture 1. This lecture discusses predominantly Stravinsky, whom Bernstein considers the poet of earth.

Stravinsky kept tonality alive through the use of free dissonance, and more specifically, polytonality (p. 338). Stravinsky, therefore, is the poet of earth, because his contributions to music have the potential to save tonality. He used free dissonance and rhythmic complexities to enliven tonality after it had reached the chromatic brink of collapse at the hands of Mahler and Debussy.

Stravinsky's semantic ambiguity arises from his objective treatment of styles outside of his direct life experience and training as a composer. These styles include folk music, "prehistoric" music, French music, jazz, etc. (p. 360-61), and they create ambiguity by conflicting with the identity of the composer.

Bernstein explores the concept of sincerity in music to explain that Adorno's preference for Schoenberg arose out of a belief in his sincerity. Bernstein indicates, however, that Stravinsky's use of neoclassicism is, in fact, a matter of sincerity. By keeping an emotional distance, Stravinsky achieves "objective expressivity".

Syntactically, in this lecture he again coins a new type of structure, this one a combination of surface-structure music and super-surface structure poetry. This level is found in music with text, and he explores (1) the relationships between text and music and (2) the new artistic material that results from their combination. He designates this combination of text and music as the "X-factor" (p. 384).

At the end of the lecture, Bernstein adds his final thoughts on the state of music and its future. Here he combines the "quasi-scientific" format established in lecture 1 with an emotional appeal to make a case for continuing the use of tonality. Although he spends a lot of time arguing for neoclassicism and new ways to write tonal music, Bernstein ultimately makes a case for eclecticism, where various compositional techniques – twelve-tone, tonality, polytonality – are all welcome, so long as tonality predominates (p. 422).

Some terminological issues arise in this lecture between the definitions previously established by Bernstein and their continued use. For instance, the X-factor is not used the same way in this lecture as it is in lecture 3. Earlier, it meant a commonality necessary to draw a metaphor between two otherwise unlike things. For example, the X-factor between Juliet and the sun would be radiance; the X-factor in musical metaphors would be a similarity like rhythm or contour (p. 127). In lecture 6, Bernstein reuses this term, but this time to refer to the junction of poetry and music. Bernstein's definition of syntax has also morphed through the lecture series. Bernstein introduced syntax as transformative processes leading to a final musical product, whose raw ingredients include melody, harmony, and rhythm; but more increasingly, Bernstein uses syntax only in terms of rhythm. He discusses a syntactic vagueness in lecture 4, which regarded ambiguity of meter (p. 197), and in lecture 6, Stravinsky's syntactic ambiguity arises out of rhythmic displacement (p. 345).

The lecture ends with a complete performance of Oedipus Rex.

== The meaning of music ==
Bernstein's children's concert series with the New York Philharmonic, the Young People's Concerts, included a concert titled, "What does Music Mean?" This concert took place in 1958, and it gives us a glimpse of Bernstein's beliefs about musical meaning before his Norton Lectures. He first eliminates the idea that musical meaning is tied to stories or pictures. He then concludes that music means what it makes the listener feel, and that having various, strong feelings during a performance equates to understanding the piece. This is a radical step away from the suggestion that music means a series of overlapping transformations, even though in the Norton Lectures Bernstein mentions this program and claims his opinions about the meaning of music remained the same. His next sentence, however, contradicts this: "music has intrinsic meanings of its own, which are not to be confused with specific feelings or moods" (The Unanswered Question, p. 10). This goes directly against his earlier opinion that music means nothing more or less than what it makes the listener feel.

== Reception ==
At Harvard, the lectures had mixed success. The lectures were very long, with the sixth lecture lasting over three hours. Attendance at the first lecture suffered after a bomb threat interruption, which caused the building to be evacuated. Although much of the audience did not return after the bomb threat, Joan Peyser indicates that, in general, the audience at the lectures was very large. Outside of Harvard, reception within the musical community was negative. Paul Laird summarizes the lectures and their criticism concisely: "Bernstein's major argument concerned the continued importance of tonality in contemporary music, which he defended tenaciously. Bernstein applied principles from linguist Noam Chomsky in his lectures, an approach that has been questioned by a number of music theorists, but Bernstein did provide interesting insights into the music that he considered." Michael Steinberg followed up at the end of the lecture series with an article in The New York Times lauding Bernstein's rhetorical skills, but chastising the musical contributions. In particular, Steinberg takes issue with Bernstein's inadequate depiction of Schoenberg's music: in a "whirlwind of evasion, confusion, [and] distortion, he misanalysed music". Among other points, Steinberg contrasts Bernstein's hasty piano performance of Schoenberg's music with the pre-recorded video of Berg's twelve-tone piece, the more accessible version of twelve-tone writing.

Typically, reviewers were critical about the linguistic connection accompanying Bernstein's lectures. The most notable critical response came from Allan Keiler in 1978 in an article analyzing these linguistic aspects. He comments that the lectures "cannot be considered a well-conceived or rigorous contribution to this kind of interdisciplinary study", but he wants to continue the conversation about possible benefits of a linguistic-inspired analysis of music. Keiler takes particular issue with Bernstein's neglect of various musical cultures for theories of universal musical competence.

Finally, Shiry Rashkovsky picked up the linguistic connection debate in 2012, focusing on Bernstein's self-declared "quasi-scientific" approach. She adds some criticisms about Bernstein's insistence that music is "bounded within the realm of the aesthetic" after he described the origin of music as communicative. In a more positive light, however, she examines the musical/linguistic connection with more recent evidence from the fields of neuroscience and evolutionary biology. "Research in evolutionary biology ... goes some way to substantiate Bernstein's claims of a musical monogenesis."

In the music world at large, Bernstein's lectures continued the long-running debate about twelve-tone technique's ultimate value to music. As Humphrey Burton describes, Bernstein's opinions were "flying in the face of entrenched positions across the Western world". This might be a bit of an overstatement, as the 1960s saw an increase in stylistic alternatives which embraced tonality. Keiler designated this topic the "old issue of serialism verses tonality", although he does give Bernstein credit for bringing to it a fresh perspective.

A different type of reaction to Bernstein's lectures can be found in a more recent article by Anthony Tommasini in The New York Times, which seeks to explain twelve-tone technique. Although Tommasini makes no mention of Bernstein until well into the article, he draws continuously and heavily on the Norton Lectures. Tommasini picks up on the twenty-first century legacy of twelve-tone technique in order to examine its lingering significance. He uses language very similar to the Norton Lectures to explain tonality: "fundamental tonal mooring", "hierarchy of importance based on natural overtone relationships", and "crisis", in reference to the years before Schoenberg invented twelve-tone technique. This article makes evident that Bernstein's contributions to the mid-twentieth century debate about tonality, while sometimes unacknowledged, remain one of the largest contributions in the field.

== Legacy ==
Due to Bernstein's innovative dissemination of information, these lectures became much more widespread than those of any former Charles Eliot Norton visiting professor at Harvard. Though the airing was not immediate, PBS ran the lectures in the United States, and they aired later on BBC in Great Britain. The book was published in 1976.

Although these lectures remained contentious, they successfully promoted Bernstein as an academic. He was soon granted similar guest faculty positions at both Yale University and the University of California, Berkeley.

Bernstein says that 1966 was "a low point in the musical course of our century – certainly the lowest I have ever experienced" (The Unanswered Question p. 419). Although in 1973 his confidence about the future of classical music had increased, the rise of non-tonal music as a solution to oversaturation of chromaticism was still recent history. These lectures serve as important landmarks in Bernstein's career, the twentieth century dispute about tonality, and pedagogy for the masses, but relatively little information has been written about them.
