= Mr. Palomar =

1983 novel by Italo Calvino

Cover of the first edition, published by Einaudi, Turin.

Mr. Palomar is a 1983 novel by the Italian writer Italo Calvino. Its original Italian title is Palomar. In an interview with Gregory Lucente, Calvino stated that he began writing Mr. Palomar in 1975, making it a predecessor to earlier published works such as If on a winter's night a traveler. Mr. Palomar was published in an English translation by William Weaver in 1985.

== Plot ==
In 27 short chapters, arranged in a 3 × 3 × 3 pattern, the title character makes philosophical observations about the world around him. The structure is a lexicographically ordered Cartesian product of a uniform base-3 system in which Calvino describes a man on a quest to quantify complex phenomena in a search for fundamental truths on the nature of being.

According to the note to the reader at the end of the book, the book is arranged around three thematic areas. The first section is concerned chiefly with visual experience; the second with anthropological and cultural themes; the third with speculations about larger questions such as the cosmos, time, and infinity. This thematic triad is mirrored in the three subsections of each section, and the three chapters in each subsection.

For example, chapter 1.2.3, "The infinite lawn" ("Il prato infinito") has elements of all three themes, and shows the progress of the book in miniature. It encompasses very detailed observations of the various plants growing in Mr Palomar's lawn, an investigation of the symbolism of the lawn as a marker of culture versus nature, the problem of categorizing weeds, the problem of the actual extent of the lawn, the problem of how we perceive elements and collections of those elements ... These thoughts and others run seamlessly together, so by the end of the chapter we find Mr Palomar extending his mind far beyond his garden, and contemplating the nature of the universe itself.

== Themes ==
In Mr. Palomar, Calvino continued to explore his fascination with literary self-consciousness. Comparing the book to his other novels, Calvino noted Mr. Palomar is "a completely different work" in which he sought to respond to "the problem of non linguistic phenomena. . . . That is, how can one read something that is not written."

== References in Media ==
The character Michael Vaughn can be seen reading Mr. Palomar in "Crossings", the 12th episode of the third season of the ABC spy thriller, Alias.
