= The Complete Cosmicomics =

2009 Italo Calvino short story collection

- First English edition
- Author: Italo Calvino
- Translators: William Weaver; Martin McLaughlin; Tim Parks
- Language: Italian (first)
- Genre: Science fiction
- Publisher: Penguin Books (UK)
- Publication date: May 2009
- Publication place: Italy (first)
- Media type: Print (hardback & paperback)
- ISBN: 978-1-84614-165-2

The Complete Cosmicomics is a 2009 book that collects all (Note: "Almost all" according to The Village Voice; however, the introduction by McLaughlin claims that the book contains all the Cosmicomics.) of the Cosmicomic stories by Italian postmodern writer Italo Calvino.

The single volume collection includes the following:

- The 12 stories that comprise Cosmicomics
- The 11 stories that comprise t zero (also published as Time and the Hunter)
- 4 stories from Numbers in the Dark and Other Stories
- 7 stories newly translated by Martin McLaughlin (available for the first time in English)

Translator Martin McLaughlin explains the origins of the seven new stories in his introduction to The Complete Cosmicomics:

A little-known third collection – La memoria del mondo e altre storie cosmicomiche ("World Memory and Other Cosmicomic Stories") (1968), a volume not available commercially in Italy – offered 20 fictions in all, 12 from the previous two collections [Cosmicomics and t zero] and eight new pieces (seven of these new items are translated here for the first time into English; the other new 1968 tale, the title story, was translated by Tim Parks as "World Memory" in the 1992 volume Numbers in the Dark).
