= Eva Mameli =

Italian botanist (1886-1978)

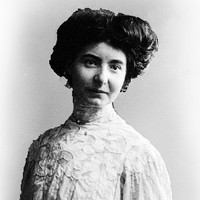
Eva Mameli

Giuliana Luigia Evelina Mameli (February 12, 1886 – March 31, 1978) was an Italian botanist, and naturalist.

== Life ==
A native of Sassari, in Sardinia, in 1906 she moved to Pavia with her brother Efisio Mameli, chemist and pharmacologist at the local university, where in 1907 she graduated in Natural Sciences. In 1915 she obtained the libera docenza. While a junior lecturer at the University of Pavia, she married agronomist Mario Calvino. In 1920 Mario offered Eva Mameli a job as Head of the Botany Department of the Agricultural Experiment Station (Estaciòn Experimental Agronòmica) in Santiago de Las Vegas, Cuba, where the couple went to live and where in 1923 their first child, Italo Calvino, was born. Born into a secular family, Eva has been described by her son Italo as a pacifist, educated in the "religion of civic duty and science". She died in San Remo, aged 92.

== Bibliography ==
- Elena Accati, Fiori in famiglia. Storia e storie di Eva Mameli Calvino (Donne nella scienza), 2011.
- Ariane Dröscher, Mameli Calvino Eva Giuliana, in Scienza a due voci. Le donne nella scienza italiana dal Settecento al Novecento, dizionario delle "scienziate" italiane dell'Università di Bologna.
- Forneris P. - Marchi L., Il giardino segreto dei Calvino. Immagini dall'album di famiglia tra Cuba e Sanremo, De Ferrari, Genova 2004.
- Paola Govoni, «Donne in un mondo senza donne». Le studentesse delle facoltà scientifiche in Italia, 1877–2005, in «Quaderni storici», CXXX (2009) n° 1, 213–248.
- Paola Govoni, “La casa laboratorio dei Calvino Mameli, tra scienza, arte e letteratura. Con lettere inedite di Italo Calvino a Olga Resnevic Signorelli”, in Belfagor, 2012, pp. 545˗567
- Paola Govoni, The Making of Italo Calvino: Women and Men in the ‘Two Cultures’ Home Laboratory, in Writing about Lives in Science: (Auto)Biography, Gender, and Genre, edited by P. Govoni and Z.A. Franceschi, Goettingen: Vandenhoeck &Ruprecht/V&R Unipress, 2014, pp. 187-221
- Macellari E., Eva Mameli Calvino, Ali&No editrice, 2010, ISBN 978-88-6254-047-6
- Migliore L., Mameli, Giuliana Eva, voce (online) in «Dizionario Biografico degli Italiani», vol. 68, Istituto dell'Enciclopedia Italiana, Roma 2007, pp. 376–378.
- Onnis, Omar; Mureddu, Manuelle (2019). Illustres. Vita, morte e miracoli di quaranta personalità sarde (in Italian). Sestu: Domus de Janas. ISBN 978-88-97084-90-7. OCLC 1124656644.
- Pedrotti F., Eva Mameli Calvino, in Idem, I pionieri della protezione della natura in Italia, Temi, Trento 2012, pp. 139–144.
- Strickland E., Scienziate d'Italia. Diciannove vite per la ricerca, Donzelli Editore, Roma 2011.
