= Charles Eliot Norton Lectures =

Lecture series at Harvard University

The Charles Eliot Norton Professorship of Poetry at Harvard University was established in 1925 as an annual lectureship in "poetry in the broadest sense" and named for the university's former professor of fine arts. Distinguished creative figures and scholars in the arts, including painting, architecture, and music deliver customarily six lectures. The lectures are usually dated by the academic year in which they are given, though sometimes by just the calendar year.

Many but not all of the Norton Lectures have subsequently been published by the Harvard University Press. The following table lists all the published lecture series, with academic year given and year of publication, together with unpublished lectures as are known. Titles under which the lectures were published are not necessarily titles under which they were given.

== Charles Eliot Norton Lectures ==
Table of lecturers and lectures held:
Years	Lecturer	Title	Published
1926–1927	Gilbert Murray	The Classical Tradition in Poetry	1927
1927–1928	Eric Maclagan	Italian Sculpture of the Renaissance	1935
1929–1930	H. W. Garrod	Poetry and the Criticism of Life	1931
1930–1931	Arthur Mayger Hind	Rembrandt	1932
1931–1932	Sigurður Nordal	The Spirit of Icelandic Literature (8 lectures: ???—The Old Poetry—The Sagas of Iceland—...—The World of Reality—The World of Dreams...)	
1932–1933	T. S. Eliot	The Use of Poetry and the Use of Criticism: Studies in the Relation of Criticism to Poetry in England (The Relation of Criticism and Poetry—Poetry and Criticism in the Time of Elizabeth—The Classical Tradition: Dryden and Johnson—The Theories of Coleridge and Wordsworth—The Practice of Shelley and Keats—Arnold and the Academic Mind—The Modern Mind: I—The Modern Mind: II)	1933
1933–1934	Laurence Binyon	The Spirit of Man in Asian Art	1935
1935–1936	Robert Frost	The Renewal of Words (The Old Way to Be New—Vocal Imagination, the Merger of Form and Content—Does Wisdom Signify—Poetry as Prowess (Feat of Words)—Before the Beginning of a Poem—After the End of a Poem)	
1936–1937	Johnny Roosval	The Poetry of Chiaroscuro	
1937–1938	Chauncey Brewster Tinker	Painter and Poet: Studies in the Literary Relations of English Painting	1938
1938–1939	Sigfried Giedion	Space, Time and Architecture: The Growth of a New Tradition	1941
1939–1940	Igor Stravinsky	Poetics of Music in the Form of Six Lessons	1942
1940–1941	Pedro Henríquez Ureña	Literary Currents in Hispanic America	1945
1947–1948	Erwin Panofsky	Early Netherlandish Painting: Its Origins and Character	1953
1948–1949	C. M. Bowra	The Romantic Imagination	1949
1949–1950	Paul Hindemith	A Composer's World: Horizons and Limitations	1952
1950–1951	Thornton Wilder	The American Characteristics in Classic American Literature (Adapting an Island Language to a Continental Thought—Thoreau, or the Bean-Row in the Wilderness—Emily Dickinson, or the Articulate Inarticulate—Walt Whitman and the American Loneliness)	
1951–1952	Aaron Copland	Music and Imagination	1952
1952–1953	E. E. Cummings	i: six nonlectures	1953
1953–1954	Herbert Read	Icon and Idea: The Function of Art in the Development of Human Consciousness	1955
1955–1956	Edwin Muir	The Estate of Poetry	1962
1956–1957	Ben Shahn	The Shape of Content	1957
1957–1958	Jorge Guillén	Language and Poetry: Some Poets of Spain	1961
1958–1959	Carlos Chávez	Musical Thought	1961
1960–1961	Eric Bentley	The Springs of Pathos	
1961–1962	Félix Candela	The Paradox of Structuralism, Comments on the Collaboration Between Architects and Engineers, The Creative Process and the Expressiveness of Inner Space	
1961–1962	Buckminster Fuller		
1961–1962	Pier Luigi Nervi	Aesthetics and Technology in Building	1965
1962–1963	Leo Schrade	Tragedy in the Art of Music	1964
1964–1965	Cecil Day-Lewis	The Lyric Impulse	1965
1966–1967	Meyer Schapiro	Romanesque Architectural Sculpture	2006
1967–1968	Jorge Luis Borges	This Craft of Verse	2026
1968–1969	Roger Sessions	Questions about Music	1970
1969–1970	Lionel Trilling	Sincerity and Authenticity	1972
1970–1971	Charles Eames	Problems Relating to Visual Communication and the Visual Environment	
1971–1972	Octavio Paz	Children of the Mire: Modern Poetry from Romanticism to the Avant-Garde	1974
1973–1974	Leonard Bernstein	The Unanswered Question	1976
1974–1975	Northrop Frye	The Secular Scripture: A Study of the Structure of Romance	1976
1977–1978	Frank Kermode	The Genesis of Secrecy: On the Interpretation of Narrative	1979
1978–1979	James Cahill	The Compelling Image: Nature and Style in Seventeenth-Century Chinese Painting	1982
1979–1980	Helen Gardner	In Defence of the Imagination	1982
1980–1981	Charles Rosen	The Romantic Generation	1995
1981–1982	Czesław Miłosz	The Witness of Poetry	1983
1983–1984	Frank Stella	Working Space	1986
1985–1986	Italo Calvino	Six Memos for the Next Millennium	1988
1987–1988	Harold Bloom	Ruin the Sacred Truths: Poetry and Belief from the Bible to the Present	1989
1988–1989	John Cage	I-VI	1990
1989–1990	John Ashbery	Other Traditions	2000
1992–1993	Umberto Eco	Six Walks in the Fictional Woods	1994
1993–1994	Luciano Berio	Remembering the Future	2006
1994–1995	Nadine Gordimer	Writing and Being	1995
1995–1996	Leo Steinberg	"The Mute Image and the Meddling Text"	
1997–1998	Joseph Kerman	Concerto Conversations	1999
2001–2002	George Steiner	Lessons of the Masters (published as: Lasting Origins—Rain of Fire—Magnificus—Maîtres à Penser—On Native Ground—Unaging Intellect)	2003
2003–2004	Linda Nochlin	Bathers, Bodies, Beauty: The Visceral Eye (published as: Renoir's Great Bathers: Bathing as Practice, Bathing as Representation—Manet's Le Bain: The Déjuner and the Death of the Heroic Landscape—The Man in the Bathtub: Picasso's Le Meutre and the Gender of Bathing—Monet's Hôtel des Roches Noires: Anxiety and Perspective at the Seashore—Real Beauty: The Body in Realism—More Beautiful than a Beautiful Thing: The Body, Old Age, Ruin, and Death)	2006
2006–2007	Daniel Barenboim	Sound and Thought (published in Music Quickens Time as: Sound and Thought—Listening and Hearing—Freedom of Thought and Interpretation—The Orchestra—A Tale of Two Palestinians—Finale)	2008
2009–2010	Orhan Pamuk	The Naive and the Sentimental Novelist (What Happens to Us as We Read Novels—Mr. Pamuk, Did You Really Live All of This?—Character, Time, Plot—Pictures and Things—Museums and Novels—The Center)	2010
2011–2012	William Kentridge	Six Drawing Lessons (In Praise of Shadows—A Brief History of Colonial Revolts—Vertical Thinking: A Johannesburg Biography—Practical Epistemology: Life in the Studio—In Praise of Mistranslation—Anti-Entropy)	2012
2013–2014	Herbie Hancock	The Ethics of Jazz (The Wisdom of Miles Davis—Breaking the Rules—Cultural Diplomacy and the Voice of Freedom—Innovation and New Technologies—Buddhism and Creativity—Once upon a Time...)	
2015–2016	Toni Morrison	The Origin of Others - The Literature of Belonging (Romancing Slavery—Being and Becoming the Stranger—The Color Fetish—Configurations of Blackness—Narrating the Other—The Foreigner's Home)	2017
2017–2018	Frederick Wiseman	Wide Angle: The Norton Lectures on Cinema (The Search for Story, Structure, and Meaning in Documentary Film: Part I—The Search for Story, Structure, and Meaning in Documentary Film: Part II)	
2017–2018	Agnès Varda	(The 7th Art and Me—Crossing the Borders)	
2017–2018	Wim Wenders	(Poetry in Motion—The Visible and the Invisible)	
2021–2022	Laurie Anderson	Spending the War Without You: Virtual Backgrounds	
2023–2024	Viet Thanh Nguyen	To Save and To Destroy: On Writing as an Other	

For years not listed, there was no incumbent in the post.
