= Trauma Zero =

TraumaZero is the former name of the Amiga game T-Zer0. It is a horizontally scrolling shooter developed by TraumaZero Team during 1998 and published by ClickBOOM in 1999. The game uses the Amiga's AGA display.

A digital remake of T-Zer0 soundtracks has been included in the Amiga Immortal 4 CD, published in December 2010 by Maz Sound Tools Distributor.

== Reception ==
T-Zer0 was reviewed in October 1999 by Amiga Format, awarding it 93%, and Amiga Active, where it received 9/10.
