= Andrea De Carlo =

Italian novelist

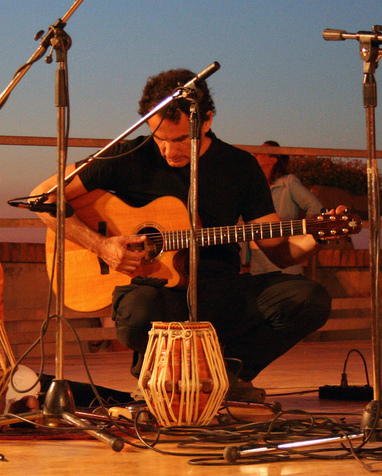
- De Carlo in 2007
- Born: 11 December 1952 (age 73); Milan, Italy
- Citizenship: Italy
- Education: University of Milan
- Occupation: Writer
- Writing career
- Language: Italian
- Period: 1981–present
- Website: AndreaDeCarlo.com

Andrea De Carlo (born 11 December 1952) is an Italian novelist. He has published almost two dozen novels, many of which have been translated.

== Biography ==
Andrea De Carlo grew up in Milan. He attended the liceo classico Giovanni Berchet (which appears in the initial chapters of Due di Due); then he graduated in modern literature, with a degree in contemporary history. He worked for a time as a photographer, initially as second assistant to Oliviero Toscani, and then doing portraits and reportage on his own.

He travelled widely in the United States, living first in Boston, then New York City, Santa Barbara and Los Angeles, where he did odd jobs and taught Italian. Then he moved on to Australia, staying in Sydney and Melbourne. In this period, he wrote two novels intended as "exercises of style", which he decided not to publish.

He settled back in Italy, in Milan and Rome and then in the countryside near Urbino. In 1981, the publishing house Einaudi published his first novel, Treno di Panna, which he had already written in English under the title "Cream Train". Italo Calvino wrote an introduction. A movie adapted from the book would later be produced. Calvino explained that the book was a successful attempt "to describe the internal turmoil of a young man of our time through an external projection", in the words of critic G. d'Angelo, but d'Angelo panned the book in a 1982 review; he found only "emptiness" in the book, along with lexical and grammatical problems and a "flat, wooden style".

His second novel, Uccelli da gabbia e da voliera ("Cage and Aviary Birds"), published in 1982, was praised by Federico Fellini, with whom De Carlo worked as assistant director on the movie E la nave va (And the Ship Sails On). Towards the end of shooting, De Carlo made the short film Le facce di Fellini ("The Faces of Fellini") about the relationship between the great Italian director and his actors. He later collaborated with Michelangelo Antonioni on the screenplay for a film that was never made. Macno, his third novel, was published in 1984, and originates in a conversation De Carlo had with a Los Angeles studio executive about audience control and manipulation. The title character rules a Latin-American country (really a stand-in for Italy in the 1980s), and hires two journalists, as well as other professionals (including writers and scientists), and keeps them at his court--until he is murdered and his place taken by a lieutenant. One reviewer called the novel ambitious, but said it failed, with stereotypical characters and a plot that fails to coalesce: "the novel is an interesting attempt by a talented writer, but only a modest success."

His best-known novel is Due di Due ("Two Out of Two"), a partly autobiographical story of friendship: De Carlo's role is divided between the contrasting personalities of the creative, adventurous, anarchic Guido Laremi and the more subdued and down-to-earth Mario, the narrator of the story.

He is the author of 20 novels, which have been translated into 26 languages.

He has a daughter named Malina. His father was Giancarlo De Carlo.

== Bibliography ==
- Treno di panna ("Creamtrain") (1981) introduction by Italo Calvino
- Uccelli da gabbia e da voliera ("Cage and Aviary Birds") (1982)
- Macno (1984)
- Yucatan (1986)
- Due di due ("Two Out of Two") (1989)
- Tecniche di seduzione ("Techniques of Seduction") (1991)
- Arcodamore ("Lovebow") (1993)
- Uto (1995)
- Di noi tre ("About the Three of Us") (1997)
- Nel momento ("Here and Now") (1999)
- Pura vita ("Pure Life") (2001)
- I veri nomi ("The Real Names") (2002)
- Giro di vento ("Windshift", English version by the author) (2004)
- Mare delle verità ("Sea of Truth") (2006)
- Durante (2008)
- Leielui (She and He) (2010)
- Villa Metaphora (2012)
- Cuore primitivo (Primitive Heart) (2014)
- L'imperfetta meraviglia (Imperfect Delight) (2016)
- Una di Luna (Woman In the Moon) (2018)
- Il teatro dei sogni (Theater of Dreams) (2020)
- Io, Jack e Dio (2022)

His books are published in Italy by La nave di Teseo and by Atria (Simon & Schuster) in the USA. They have been translated into 26 different languages.

== Translations ==
"Due di Due" and "Tecniche di Seduzione" were translated into English by Paula M. C. Geldenhuys, and published as "Two out of Two" and "Techniques of Seduction", respectively, by Troubador Publishing Ltd in their Troubador Storia series (2009 and 2010). "Giro di vento" was translated into English by Andrea De Carlo and published as "Windshift" by Rizzoli USA (2006). "Leielui", also translated by the author as "She and He" in 2013, is available for Kindle on Amazon. "L'imperfetta meraviglia" and "Due di due" have been published in French as "La merveille imperfecte"(2017) and "Deux sur deux" (2018) by HC Editions, in a translation by Chantal Moiroud.

== Discography ==
He wrote and staged, together with composer Ludovico Einaudi, the dance production Time Out with the American troupe ISO, and Salgari with Daniel Ezralow and the ballet company of the Arena di Verona.

He has composed and performed the soundtrack for the film Uomini & donne, amori & bugie, and the music for the CDs Alcuni nomi and Dentro Giro di Vento.

== Cinematography ==
- Assistant to director Federico Fellini for the film E la nave va
- Co-screenwriter with Michelangelo Antonioni (the film has not been produced)
- Director of the documentary Le facce di Fellini, and the film adaptation of Treno di panna.
