= The Crow Comes Last =

Story collection by Italo Calvino

First edition (publ. Einaudi, cover shows details from Bosch's The Garden of Earthly Delights)

The Crow Comes Last (Italian: Ultimo viene il corvo), or Last Comes the Raven, is a short story collection by Italo Calvino published in 1949. It consists of 30 stories inspired by the novelist's experiences fighting with the Garibaldi Brigades in the Maritime Alps during the final phases of World War II. The stories also include sharp observations on the panorama of postwar Italy. Although written largely in the neorealist style, many scenes are infused with visionary, fable-like elements characteristic of Calvino's later fantasy period.

A selection of these short stories comprised the following English collections by the author: Adam, One Afternoon, and Other Stories (1957), The Watcher and Other Stories (1975), and Difficult Loves (1984).
