= Six Memos for the Next Millennium =

1988 book based on lectures by Italo Calvino

- Author: Italo Calvino
- Original title: Lezioni americane. Sei proposte per il prossimo millennio
- Translator: Patrick Creagh (1988); Geoffrey Brock (2016)
- Language: Italian
- Genre: Non-fiction

Six Memos for the Next Millennium (Italian: Lezioni americane. Sei proposte per il prossimo millennio) is a book based on a series of lectures written by Italo Calvino for the Charles Eliot Norton Lectures at Harvard, though Calvino died before delivering them. The lectures were written in Italian but were to be given in English in the fall of 1985. There have been two English translations, the first by Patrick Creagh, published in 1988, and the second by Geoffrey Brock, published in 2016.

The "memos" are lectures on certain literary qualities whose virtues Calvino wished to recommend to the then-approaching millennium. He intended to devote one lecture to each of six qualities: lightness, quickness, exactitude, visibility, multiplicity, and consistency. Though he completed the first five, he died before writing the last.
