= T zero =

1967 collection of short stories by Italo Calvino

t zero
- First edition
- Author: Italo Calvino
- Original title: Ti con zero
- Translator: William Weaver
- Language: Italian
- Genre: Science fiction
- Publisher: Giulio Einaudi
- Publication date: 1967
- Publication place: Italy
- English publication date: 1969
- Media type: Print
- Pages: 164

t zero (original title: Ti con zero) is a 1967 collection of short stories by Italian author Italo Calvino. The title story is based on a particularly uncertain moment in the life of a lion hunter. This second in time, t_{0}, is considered by the hunter against known previous seconds (t_{−1}, t_{−2}, ...) and hypothetical future seconds (t_{1}, t_{2}, ...)

"Qfwfq" (an always extant being introduced in Cosmicomics) narrates the first set of stories in the collection, each of which takes a scientific fact and builds a story around it. Other stories in the book diverge to a greater or lesser degree from this scientific theme. The collection is divided into three sections. The first, "Other Qfwfqs", contains four stories continuing the Cosmicomics tradition, including tales about the formation of the moon, the origin of birds, and the primordial sea. The second section, "Priscilla", consists of three stories — "Mitosis", "Meiosis", and "Death" — which explore biochemical and evolutionary themes through the recurring figure of an unattainable woman named Priscilla. The third section, "t zero", gives the book its name and includes the title story, a story set in a motorway chase, and the final postmodern reworking of The Count of Monte Cristo. The final story in the collection is a postmodern pastiche of Alexandre Dumas' The Count of Monte Cristo.

The book was also published in English with the title Time and the Hunter in 1970.

All of the stories in t zero, together with those from Cosmicomics and other sources, are now available in a single volume collection, The Complete Cosmicomics (Penguin UK, 2009).
