= Italo Calvino =

Italian author (1923–1985)

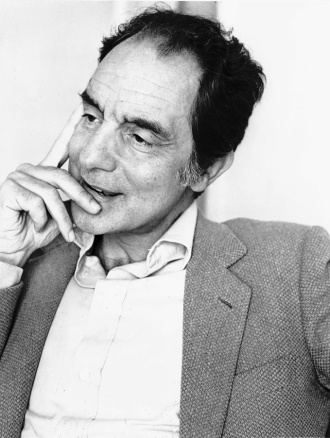
- Calvino in 1985
- Born: Italo Giovanni Calvino Mameli; 15 October 1923; Santiago de Las Vegas, Cuba
- Died: 19 September 1985 (aged 61); Siena, Tuscany, Italy
- Resting place: Garden cemetery of Castiglione della Pescaia, Italy
- Occupations: Novelist; short story writer
- Spouse: Esther Judith Singer (1925-2018)
- Children: 1
- Parents: Mario Calvino (father); Eva Mameli (mother)
- Writing career
- Notable works: The Baron in the Trees; Invisible Cities; If on a winter's night a traveler; Six Memos for the Next Millennium
- Movements: Oulipo, neorealism, Postmodernism

Italo Calvino (/kælˈviːnoʊ/, also US: /kɑːlˈ-/; Italian: [ˈiːtalo kalˈviːno]; 15 October 1923 – 19 September 1985) was an Italian novelist and short story writer. His best-known works include the Our Ancestors trilogy (1952–1959), the Cosmicomics collection of short stories (1965), and the novels Invisible Cities (1972) and If on a winter's night a traveler (1979).

Admired in Britain, Australia and the United States, Calvino was the most translated contemporary Italian writer at the time of his death.

== Biography ==
=== Parents ===
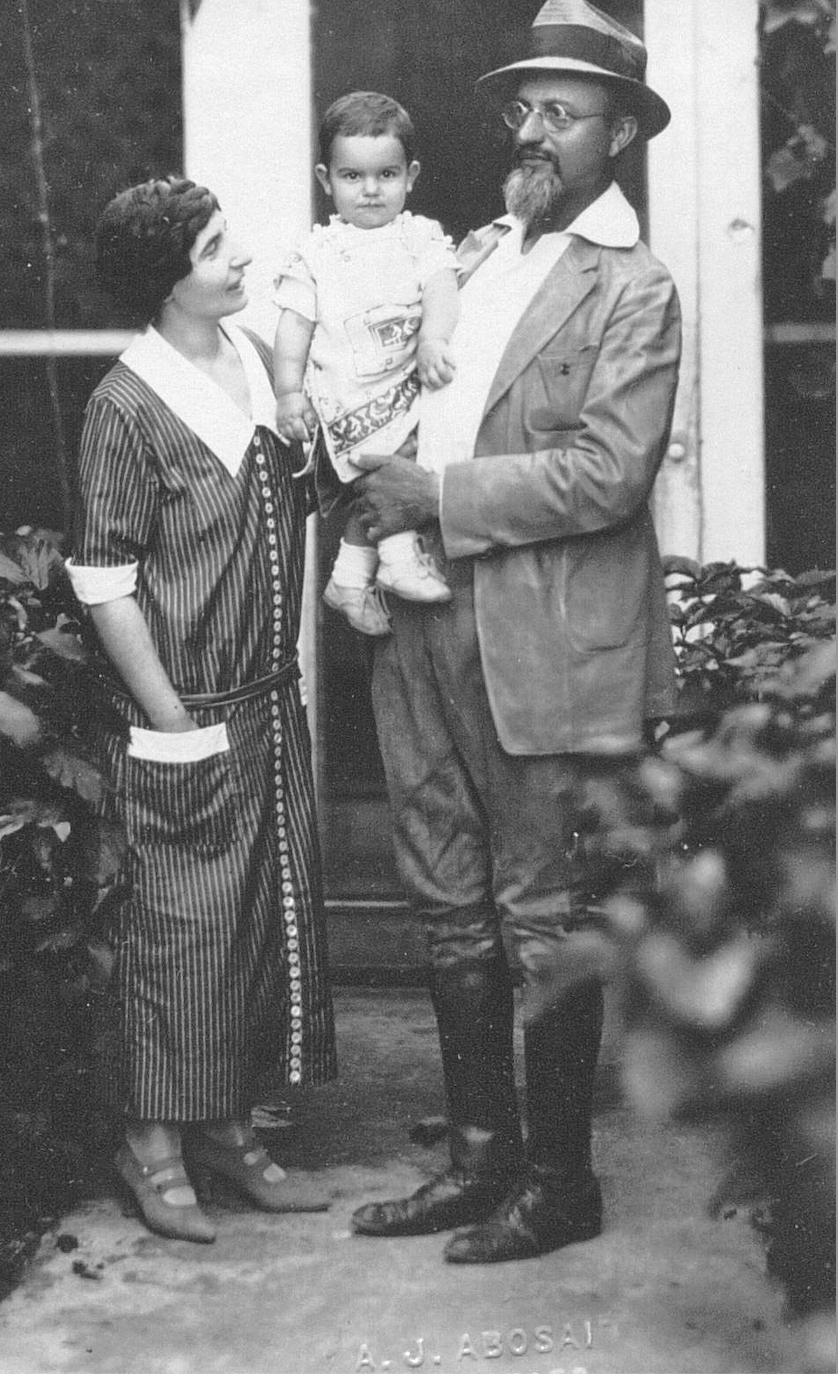
Calvino with his parents, 1925

Italo Calvino was born Italo Giovanni Calvino Mameli in Santiago de las Vegas, a suburb of Havana, Cuba, in 1923. His father, Mario, was a tropical agronomist and botanist who also taught agriculture and floriculture. Born 47 years earlier in Sanremo, Italy, Mario Calvino had emigrated to Mexico in 1909 where he took up an important position with the Ministry of Agriculture. In an autobiographical essay, Italo Calvino explained that his father "had been in his youth an anarchist, a follower of Kropotkin and then a Socialist Reformist". In 1917, Mario left for Cuba to conduct scientific experiments, after living through the Mexican Revolution.

Calvino's mother, Giuliana Luigia Evelina "Eva" Mameli, was a botanist and university professor. A native of Sassari in Sardinia and 11 years younger than her husband, she married while still a junior lecturer at the University of Pavia. Born into a secular family, Eva was a pacifist educated in the "religion of civic duty and science". Eva gave Italo his unusual first name to remind him of his Italian heritage, although he would eventually grow up in Italy. Calvino thought his name sounded "belligerently nationalist". Calvino described his parents as being "very different in personality from one another", suggesting perhaps deeper tensions behind a comfortable, albeit strict, middle-class upbringing devoid of conflict. As an adolescent, he found it hard to relate to poverty and the working-class, and was "ill at ease" with his parents' openness to the labourers who filed into his father's study on Saturdays to receive their weekly paycheck.

=== Early life and education ===
In 1925, less than two years after Calvino's birth, the family returned to Italy and settled permanently in Sanremo on the Ligurian coast. Calvino's brother Floriano, who became a distinguished geologist, was born in 1927. The family divided their time between the Villa Meridiana, an experimental floriculture station which also served as their home, and Mario's ancestral land at San Giovanni Battista. On this small working farm set in the hills behind Sanremo, Mario pioneered the cultivation of the then exotic fruits such as avocado and grapefruit, eventually obtaining an entry in the Dizionario biografico degli italiani for his achievements. The vast forests and luxuriant fauna omnipresent in Calvino's early fiction such as The Baron in the Trees derive from this "legacy". In an interview, Calvino stated that "San Remo continues to pop out in my books, in the most diverse pieces of writing."

Calvino and Floriano would climb the tree-rich estate and perch for hours on the branches reading their favourite adventure stories. Less appealing aspects of this "paternal legacy" are described in The Road to San Giovanni, Calvino's memoir of his father in which he exposes their inability to communicate: "Talking to each other was difficult. Both verbose by nature, possessed of an ocean of words, in each other's presence we became mute, would walk in silence side by side along the road to San Giovanni." A fan of Rudyard Kipling's The Jungle Book as a child, Calvino felt that his early interest in stories made him the "black sheep" of a family that held literature in less esteem than the sciences. Fascinated by American movies and cartoons, he was equally attracted to drawing, poetry, and theatre. On a darker note, Calvino recalled that his earliest memory was of a Marxist professor who had been brutally assaulted by Benito Mussolini's Blackshirts. He said: "I remember clearly that we were at dinner when the old professor came in with his face beaten up and bleeding, his bowtie all torn up over it, asking for help."

Other legacies include the parents' beliefs in Freemasonry, republicanism with elements of anarchism and Marxism. Austere freethinkers with an intense hatred of the ruling National Fascist Party, Eva and Mario also refused to give their sons any education in the Catholic Faith or any other religion. Italo attended the English nursery school St George's College, followed by a Protestant elementary private school run by Waldensians. His secondary schooling, with a classical lyceum curriculum, was completed at the state-run Liceo Gian Domenico Cassini where, at his parents' request, he was exempted from religion classes, and teachers, janitors, and fellow pupils often pressed him to justify his anti-conformism. In his mature years, Calvino described the experience as having made him "tolerant of others' opinions, particularly in the field of religion, remembering how irksome it was to hear myself mocked because I did not follow the majority's beliefs". In 1938, Eugenio Scalfari, who went on to found the weekly magazine L'Espresso and La Repubblica, a major Italian newspaper, came from Civitavecchia to join the same class though a year younger, and they shared the same desk. The two teenagers formed a lasting friendship, Calvino attributing his political awakening to their university discussions. Seated together "on a huge flat stone in the middle of a stream near our land", he and Scalfari founded a university movement called the MUL. Eva managed to delay her son's enrolment in the Fascists' armed scouts, the Balilla Moschettieri, and then arranged that he be excused, as a non-Catholic, from performing devotional acts in Church. But later, as a compulsory member, he could not avoid the assemblies and parades of the Avanguardisti and was forced to participate in the Italian invasion of the French Riviera in June 1940.

=== World War II ===
In 1941, Calvino enrolled at the University of Turin, choosing the Agriculture Faculty where his father had previously taught courses in agronomy. Concealing his literary ambitions to please his family, he passed four exams in his first year while reading anti-Fascist works by Elio Vittorini, Eugenio Montale, Cesare Pavese, Johan Huizinga, and Pisacane, and works by Max Planck, Werner Heisenberg, and Albert Einstein on physics. Calvino's real aspiration was to be a playwright. His letters to Eugenio Scalfari overflow with references to Italian and foreign plays, and with plots and characters of future theatrical projects. Luigi Pirandello and Gabriele D'Annunzio, Cesare Vico Lodovici and Ugo Betti, Eugene O'Neill and Thornton Wilder are among the main authors Calvino cites as his sources of inspiration. Disdainful of Turin students, Calvino saw himself as enclosed in a "provincial shell" that offered the illusion of immunity from the Fascist nightmare: "We were ‘hard guys’ from the provinces, hunters, snooker-players, show-offs, proud of our lack of intellectual sophistication, contemptuous of any patriotic or military rhetoric, coarse in our speech, regulars in the brothels, dismissive of any romantic sentiment and desperately devoid of women."

Calvino transferred to the University of Florence in 1943 and reluctantly passed three more exams in agriculture. By the end of the year, the Germans had succeeded in occupying Liguria and setting up Benito Mussolini's puppet Republic of Salò in northern Italy. Now twenty years old, Calvino refused military service and went into hiding. Reading intensely in a wide array of subjects, he also reasoned politically that, of all the partisan groupings, the communists were the best organized with "the most convincing political line".

In spring 1944, Eva encouraged her sons to enter the Italian Resistance in the name of "natural justice and family virtues". Using the nom de guerre "Santiago", Calvino joined the Garibaldi Brigades, a clandestine Communist group and, for twenty months, endured the fighting in the Maritime Alps until 1945 and the Liberation. As a result of his refusal to be a conscript, his parents were held hostage by the Nazis for an extended period at the Villa Meridiana. Calvino wrote of his mother's ordeal that "she was an example of tenacity and courage… behaving with dignity and firmness before the SS and the Fascist militia, and in her long detention as a hostage, not least when the blackshirts three times pretended to shoot my father in front of her eyes. The historical events which mothers take part in acquire the greatness and invincibility of natural phenomena".

=== Turin and communism ===
Calvino settled in Turin in 1945, after a long hesitation over living there or in Milan. He often humorously belittled this choice, describing Turin as a "city that is serious but sad". Returning to university, he abandoned Agriculture for the Arts Faculty. A year later, he was initiated into the literary world by Elio Vittorini, who published his short story "Andato al comando" (1945; "Gone to Headquarters") in Il Politecnico, a Turin-based weekly magazine associated with the university. The horror of the war had not only provided the raw material for his literary ambitions but deepened his commitment to the Communist cause. Viewing civilian life as a continuation of the partisan struggle, he confirmed his membership in the Italian Communist Party. On reading Vladimir Lenin's State and Revolution, he plunged into post-war political life, associating himself chiefly with the worker's movement in Turin.

In 1947, he graduated with a Master's thesis on Joseph Conrad, wrote short stories in his spare time, and landed a job in the publicity department at the Einaudi publishing house run by Giulio Einaudi. Although brief, his stint put him in regular contact with Cesare Pavese, Natalia Ginzburg, Norberto Bobbio, and many other left-wing intellectuals and writers. He then left Einaudi to work as a journalist for the official Communist daily, l'Unità, and the newborn Communist political magazine, Rinascita. During this period, Pavese and poet Alfonso Gatto were Calvino's closest friends and mentors.

His first novel, Il sentiero dei nidi di ragno (The Path to the Nest of Spiders) written with valuable editorial advice from Pavese, won the Premio Riccione on publication in 1947. With sales topping 5000 copies, a surprise success in postwar Italy, the novel inaugurated Calvino's neorealist period. In a clairvoyant essay, Pavese praised the young writer as a "squirrel of the pen" who "climbed into the trees, more for fun than fear, to observe partisan life as a fable of the forest". In 1948, he interviewed one of his literary idols, Ernest Hemingway, travelling with Natalia Ginzburg to his home in Stresa.

Ultimo viene il corvo (The Crow Comes Last), a collection of stories based on his wartime experiences, was published to acclaim in 1949. Despite the triumph, Calvino grew increasingly worried by his inability to compose a worthy second novel. He returned to Einaudi in 1950, responsible this time for the literary volumes. He eventually became a consulting editor, a position that allowed him to hone his writing talent, discover new writers, and develop into "a reader of texts". In late 1951, presumably to advance in the Communist Party, he spent two months in the Soviet Union as a correspondent for l'Unità. While in Moscow, he learned of his father's death on 25 October. The articles and correspondence he produced from this visit were published in 1952, winning the Saint-Vincent Prize for journalism.

Over a seven-year period, Calvino wrote three realist novels, The White Schooner (1947–1949), Youth in Turin (1950–1951), and The Queen's Necklace (1952–54), but all were deemed defective. Calvino's first efforts as a fictionist were marked with his experience in the Italian resistance during the Second World War, however, his acclamation as a writer of fantastic stories came in the 1950s. During the eighteen months it took to complete I giovani del Po (Youth in Turin), he made an important self-discovery: "I began doing what came most naturally to me – that is, following the memory of the things I had loved best since boyhood. Instead of making myself write the book I ought to write, the novel that was expected of me, I conjured up the book I myself would have liked to read, the sort by an unknown writer, from another age and another country, discovered in an attic." The result was Il visconte dimezzato (1952; The Cloven Viscount) composed in 30 days between July and September 1951. The protagonist, a seventeenth-century viscount sundered in two by a cannonball, incarnated Calvino's growing political doubts and the divisive turbulence of the Cold War. Skilfully interweaving elements of the fable and the fantasy genres, the allegorical novel launched him as a modern "fabulist". In 1954, Giulio Einaudi commissioned his Fiabe italiane (1956; Italian Folktales) on the basis of the question, "Is there an Italian equivalent of the Brothers Grimm?" For two years, Calvino collated tales found in 19th century collections across Italy then translated 200 of the finest from various dialects into Italian. Key works he read at this time were Vladimir Propp's Morphology of the Folktale and Historical Roots of Russian Fairy Tales, stimulating his own ideas on the origin, shape and function of the story.

In 1952 Calvino wrote with Giorgio Bassani for Botteghe Oscure, a magazine named after the popular name of the party's head offices in Rome. He also worked for Il Contemporaneo, a Marxist weekly.

From 1955 to 1958 Calvino had an affair with Italian actress Elsa De Giorgi, a married, older woman. Excerpts of the hundreds of love letters Calvino wrote to her were published in the Corriere della Sera in 2004, causing some controversy.

=== After communism ===
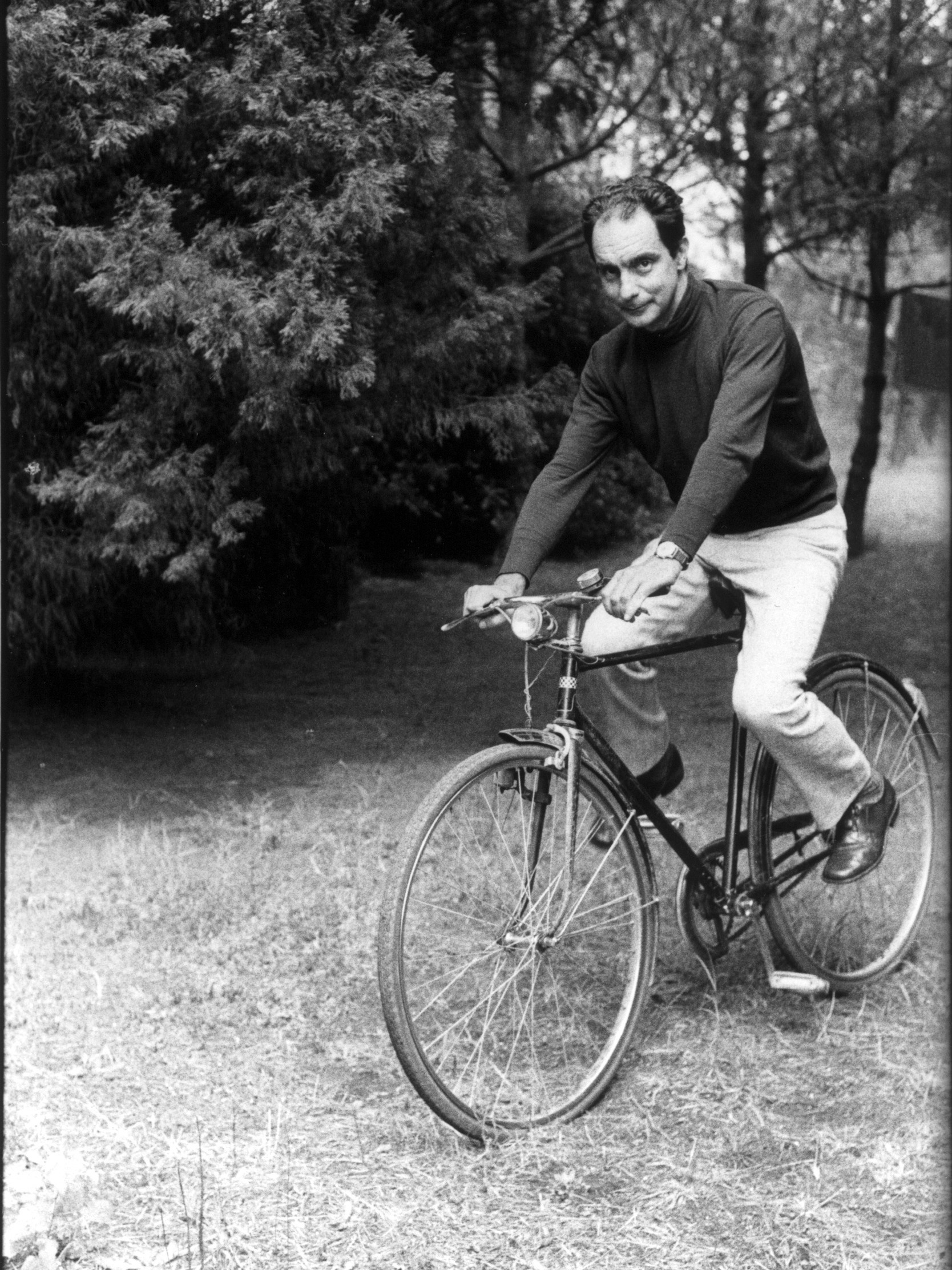
Calvino in 1970

In 1957, disillusioned by the 1956 Soviet invasion of Hungary, Calvino left the Italian Communist Party. In his letter of resignation published in l'Unità on 7 August, he explained the reason for his dissent (the violent suppression of the Hungarian uprising and the revelation of Joseph Stalin's crimes) while confirming his "confidence in the democratic perspectives" of world Communism. He withdrew from taking an active role in politics and never joined another party. Ostracized by the PCI party leader Palmiro Togliatti and his supporters on publication of Becalmed in the Antilles (La gran bonaccia delle Antille), a satirical allegory of the party's immobilism, Calvino began writing The Baron in the Trees. Completed in three months and published in 1957, the fantasy is based on the "problem of the intellectual's political commitment at a time of shattered illusions". He found new outlets for his periodic writings in the journals Città aperta and Tempo presente, the magazine Passato e presente, and the weekly Italia Domani. With Vittorini in 1959, he became co-editor of Il Menabò, a cultural journal devoted to literature in the modern industrial age, a position he held until 1966.

Despite severe restrictions in the US against foreigners holding communist views, Calvino was allowed to visit the United States, where he stayed six months from 1959 to 1960 (four of which he spent in New York), after an invitation by the Ford Foundation. Calvino was particularly impressed by the "New World": "Naturally I visited the South and also California, but I always felt a New Yorker. My city is New York." The letters he wrote to Einaudi describing this visit to the United States were first published as "American Diary 1959–1960" in Hermit in Paris in 2003.

In 1962 Calvino met Argentinian translator Esther Judith Singer ("Chichita") and married her in 1964 in Havana, during a trip in which he visited his birthplace and was introduced to Ernesto "Che" Guevara. On 15 October 1967, a few days after Guevara's death, Calvino wrote a tribute to him that was published in Cuba in 1968, and in Italy thirty years later. He and his wife settled in Rome in via Monte Brianzo where their daughter, Giovanna, was born in 1965. Once again working for Einaudi, Calvino began publishing some of his "Cosmicomics" in Il Caffè, a literary magazine.

=== Later life and work ===
Vittorini's death in 1966 greatly affected Calvino. He went through what he called an "intellectual depression", which the writer himself described as an important passage in his life: "I ceased to be young. Perhaps it's a metabolic process, something that comes with age, I'd been young for a long time, perhaps too long, suddenly I felt that I had to begin my old age, yes, old age, perhaps with the hope of prolonging it by beginning it early."

Amid the atmosphere that would evolve into 1968's cultural revolution (the French May), he and his family moved to Paris in 1967, taking up residence in a villa in the Square de Châtillon. Nicknamed l'ironique amusé, Calvino was invited by Raymond Queneau in 1968 to join the Oulipo (Ouvroir de littérature potentielle) group of experimental writers where he met Roland Barthes and Georges Perec, who would influence his later work. That same year, he turned down the Viareggio Prize for Ti con zero (Time and the Hunter) on the grounds that it was an award given by "institutions emptied of meaning". He accepted, however, both the Asti Prize and the Feltrinelli Prize for his writing in 1970 and 1972, respectively. In two autobiographical essays published in 1962 and 1970, Calvino described himself as "atheist" and his outlook as "non-religious".

The catalogue of forms is endless: until every shape has found its city, new cities will continue to be born. When the forms exhaust their variety and come apart, the end of cities begins.

— From Invisible Cities (1974)

Calvino had more significant contact with the academic world, notably at the Sorbonne (with Barthes) and the University of Urbino. His literary interests spanned multiple periods, genres, and languages, including Honoré de Balzac, Ludovico Ariosto, Dante, Ignatius of Loyola, Cervantes, Shakespeare, Cyrano de Bergerac, and Giacomo Leopardi.

Between 1972 and 1973, Calvino published two short stories, "The Name, the Nose" and the Oulipo-inspired "The Burning of the Abominable House", in the Italian edition of Playboy. He also became a regular contributor to the Italian newspaper Corriere della Sera. During this period, Calvino spent his summer vacations in a house constructed in the pinewood of Roccamare, in Castiglione della Pescaia, Tuscany.

In 1975, Calvino was made an Honorary Member of the American Academy. Awarded the Austrian State Prize for European Literature in 1976, he visited Mexico, Japan, and the United States, where he gave a series of lectures in several American cities. After his mother died in 1978 at the age of 92, Calvino sold Villa Meridiana, the family home in San Remo. Two years later, he moved to Rome in Piazza Campo Marzio near the Pantheon and began editing the work of Tommaso Landolfi for Rizzoli. Awarded the French Légion d'honneur in 1981, he also accepted the role of jury president for the 38th Venice Film Festival.

During the summer of 1985, Calvino prepared a series of texts on literature for the Charles Eliot Norton Lectures to be delivered at Harvard University in the fall. On 6 September 1985, Calvino suffered a stroke in his villa in Roccamare, where he was preparing for a lecture tour of the United States. Initially hospitalized at the Misericordia Hospital in Grosseto, he was transferred to the hospital of Santa Maria della Scala in Siena. After partially regaining consciousness, his condition worsened and he died during the night of 18/19 September of a cerebral haemorrhage, aged sixty-one. He is buried in the cemetery-garden of Castiglione della Pescaia. His lecture notes were published posthumously in Italian in 1988 and in English as Six Memos for the Next Millennium in 1993.

== Authors he helped publish ==
- Mario Rigoni Stern
- Gianni Celati
- Andrea De Carlo
- Daniele Del Giudice
- Leonardo Sciascia

== Selected publications ==
A selected bibliography of Calvino's writings follows, listing the works that have been published in English translation, along with a few major untranslated works. More exhaustive bibliographies can be found in Martin McLaughlin's Italo Calvino and Beno Weiss's Understanding Italo Calvino.

=== Fiction ===
Title	Original publication	English translation	Translator
Il sentiero dei nidi di ragno The Path to the Nest of Spiders The Path to the Spiders' Nests	1947	1957; 1998	Archibald Colquhoun; Martin McLaughlin
Il visconte dimezzato The Cloven Viscount	1952	1962	Archibald Colquhoun
La formica argentina The Argentine Ant	1952	1957	Archibald Colquhoun
Fiabe italiane Italian Fables Italian Folk Tales Italian Folktales	1956	1961; 1975; 1980	Louis Brigante; Sylvia Mulcahy; George Martin
Il barone rampante The Baron in the Trees	1957	1959	Archibald Colquhoun
La speculazione edilizia A Plunge into Real Estate	1957	1984	D. S. Carne-Ross
Il cavaliere inesistente The Nonexistent Knight	1959	1962	Archibald Colquhoun
La giornata d'uno scrutatore The Watcher	1963	1971	William Weaver
Marcovaldo ovvero le stagioni in città Marcovaldo or the Seasons in the City	1963	1983	William Weaver
La nuvola di smog Smog	1965	1971	William Weaver
Le cosmicomiche Cosmicomics	1965	1968	William Weaver
Ti con zero t zero (also published as Time and the Hunter)	1967	1969	William Weaver
Il castello dei destini incrociati The Castle of Crossed Destinies	1969	1977	William Weaver
Gli amori difficili Difficult Loves (also the title of 2 different collections)	1970	1984	William Weaver
Le città invisibili Invisible Cities	1972	1974	William Weaver
Se una notte d'inverno un viaggiatore If on a winter's night a traveler	1979	1981	William Weaver
Palomar Mr. Palomar	1983	1985	William Weaver

=== Fiction collections ===
Title	Original publication	English translation	Translator
Ultimo viene il corvo The Crow Comes Last / Last Comes the Raven	1949	–	–
30 short stories published between 1946 and 1949: Adam, One Afternoon; A Ship Loaded with Crabs; The Enchanted Garden; Dawn in the Bare Branches; Father to Sea; Man in the Wasteland; The Master’s Eye; Lazy Sons; A Goatherd at Luncheon; The Bagnasco Brothers; The House of the Beehives; The Same Thing as Blood; The Wait for Death in the Hotel; Anguish in the Barrack; Fear on the Footpath; Hunger at Beaver; Going to Headquarters; Last Comes the Raven; One of the Three is Still Alive; Animal Woods; Minefield; Seen in the Cafeteria; Theft in a Pastry Shop; Dollars and Old Whores; The Adventure of a Soldier; Sleeping like Dogs; Desire in November; A Judge is Hanged; The Cat and the Policeman; Who Put the Mine in the Sea?
L'entrata in guerra Into the War	1954	2011	Martin McLaughlin
3 stories:'Into the War', 'The Avanguardisti in Menton', 'UNPA Nights'.
– Adam, One Afternoon and Other Stories	–	1957	Archibald Colquhoun, Peggy Wright
21 short stories: Adam, One Afternoon; The Enchanted Garden; Father to Son; A Goatherd at Luncheon; Leaving Again Shortly; The House of the Beehives; Fear on the Footpath; Hunger at Bévera; Going to Headquarters; The Crow Comes Last; One of the Three is Still Alive; Animal Wood; Theft in a Cake Shop; Dollars and the Demi-Mondaine; Sleeping Like Dogs; Desire in November; A Judgment; The Cat and the Policeman; Who Put the Mine in the Sea?; The Argentine Ant.
I racconti The Stories	1958	–	–
52 short stories and novellas. Part I - Gli idilli difficili (“Difficult Idylls”), 32 short stories: Pesci gross, pesci piccoli; Un pomeriggio Adamo; Un bastimento carico di granchi; Il giardino incantato; Mai nessuno degli uomini lo seppe; Un bel gioco dura poco; Andato al comando; Ultimo viene il corvo; Paura sul sentiero; Campo di mini; Uno dei tre è ancora vivo; Il bosco degli animali; paese infido; Furto in una pasticceria; Si dorme come cani; Va’ cosi che vai bene; Dollari e vecchie mondane; Un letto di passaggio; Il gatto e il poliziotto; Funghi in città; Il piccione comunale; La pietanziera; La cura delle vespe; Il bosco sull’autostrada; L’aria buona; Il coniglio velenoso; La panchina; Luna e Gnac; La gallina di reparto; La notte dei numeri; La signora Paulatim. Part II - Le memorie difficili (“Difficult Memories”), 8 short stories: Uomo nei gerbidi; I fratelli Bagnasco; L’occhio del padrone; I figli poltroni; Pranzo con un pastore; L’entrata in guerra; Gli avanguardisti a Mentone; Le notti dell’UNPA. Part III - Gli amori difficili (“Difficult Loves”), 9 short stories: L’avventura di un soldato; L’avventura di una bagnante; L’avventura di un impiegato; L’avventura di un miope; L’avventura di un lettore; L’avventura di una moglie; L’avventura di un viaggiatore; L’avventura di due sposi; L’avventura di un poeta. Part IV - La vita difficile (“Difficult Lives”), 3 novellas: La formica argentina; La speculazione edilizia; La nuvola di smog.
I nostri antenati Our Ancestors	1960	1962	Archibald Colquhoun
3 novels: The Cloven Viscount; The Baron in the Trees; The Nonexistent Knight.
– The Watcher and Other Stories	–	1971	Archibald Colquhoun, William Weaver
3 novellas: The Watcher; The Argentine Ant; Smog.
Gli amori difficili Difficult Loves	1970	1983	William Weaver, D. S. Carne-Ross
3 novellas: Difficult Loves; Smog; A Plunge into Real Estate.
– Difficult Loves	–	1984	William Weaver, Archibald Colquhoun, Peggy Wright
The novella, Difficult Loves, and 20 short stories: Adam, One Afternoon; The Enchanted Garden; A Goatherd at Luncheon; The House of the Beehives; Big Fish, Little Fish; A Ship Loaded with Crabs; Man in the Wasteland; Lazy Sons; Fear on the Footpath; Hunger at Bévera; Going to Headquarters; The Crow Comes Last; One of the Three Is Still Alive; Animal Woods; Mine Field; Theft in a Pastry Shop; Dollars and the Demimondaine; Sleeping like Dogs; Desire in November; Transit Bed.
Sotto il sole giaguaro Under the Jaguar Sun	1986	1988	William Weaver
3 short stories: Under the Jaguar Sun; A King Listens; The Name, The Nose.
Prima che tu dica 'Pronto' Numbers in the Dark and Other Stories	1993	1996	Tim Parks
37 short stories: The Man Who Shouted Teresa; The Flash; Making Do; Dry River; Conscience; Solidarity; The Black Sheep; Good for Nothing; Like a Flight of Ducks; Love Far from Home; Wind in a City; The Lost Regiment; Enemy Eyes; A General in the Library; The Workshop Hen; Numbers in the Dark; The Queen's Necklace; Becalmed in the Antilles; The Tribe with Its Eyes on the Sky; Nocturnal Soliloquy of a Scottish Nobleman; A Beautiful March Day; World Memory; Beheading the Heads; The Burning of the Abominable House; The Petrol Pump; Neanderthal Man; Montezuma; Before You Say 'Hello'; Glaciation; The Call of the Water; The Mirror, the Target; The Other Eurydice; The Memoirs of Casanova; Henry Ford; The Last Channel; Implosion; Nothing and Not Much.
Tutte le cosmicomiche The Complete Cosmicomics	1997	2009	Martin McLaughlin, Tim Parks, William Weaver
The collections Cosmicomics and t zero, 4 stories from Numbers in the Dark and Other Stories, and 7 stories newly translated by Martin McLaughlin.

=== Essays and other writings ===
Title	Original publication	English translation	Translator
Orlando Furioso di Ludovico Ariosto –	1970	–	–
An interpretation of the epic poem, and selections.
Autobiografia di uno spettatore Autobiography of a Spectator	1974	–	–
Preface to Fellini's Quattro film (Four Films).
Introduction to Faits divers de la terre et du ciel by Silvina Ocampo –	1974	–	–
With a preface by Jorge Luis Borges.
Una pietra sopra: Discorsi di letteratura e società The Uses of Literature (also published as The Literature Machine)	1980	1986	Patrick Creagh
Essays on literature.
Racconti fantastici dell'ottocento Fantastic Tales	1983	1997	Martin McLaughlin (introduction); Alfred MacAdam (headnotes)
Anthology of classic supernatural stories.
Science et métaphore chez Galilée Science and Metaphor in Galileo Galilei	1983	–	–
Lectures given at the École des hautes études in Paris.
The Written and the Unwritten Word	1983	1983	William Weaver
Lecture at the New York Institute for the Humanities on 30 March 1983
Collezione di sabbia Collection of Sand	1984	2013	Martin McLaughlin
Journalistic essays from 1974 to 1984
Lezioni americane: Sei proposte per il prossimo millennio Six Memos for the Next Millennium	1988	1993	Patrick Creagh
Originally prepared for the Charles Eliot Norton Lectures. On the values of literature.
Sulla fiaba –	1988	–	–
Essays on fables.
I libri degli altri. Lettere 1947–1981 –	1991	–	–
Letters that Calvino wrote to other authors, whilst he worked at Einaudi.
Perché leggere i classici Why Read the Classics?	1991	1993	Martin McLaughlin
Essays on classic literature.

=== Autobiographical works ===
Title	Original publication	English translation	Translator
La strada di San Giovanni The Road to San Giovanni	1990	1993	Tim Parks
Eremita a Parigi. Pagine autobiografiche Hermit in Paris	1994	2003	Martin McLaughlin
Album Calvino	1995	none	none

=== Libretti ===
Title	Original performance
La panchina. Opera in un atto The Bench: One-Act Opera	1956
Libretto for the opera by Sergio Liberovici.
La vera storia	1982
Libretto for the opera by Luciano Berio.
Un re in ascolto A King Listens	1984
Libretto for the opera by Luciano Berio, based on Calvino's 1977 short story "A King Listens".

=== Translations ===
Original Title Translated title	Original Author	Original publication	Translated publication
Les fleurs bleues I fiori blu	Raymond Queneau	1965	1967
Le chant du Styrène La canzone del polistirene	Raymond Queneau	1958	1985

== Selected filmography ==
- Boccaccio '70, 1962 (co-wrote screenplay of "Renzo e Luciano" segment directed by Mario Monicelli)
- L'Amore difficile, 1963 (wrote "L'avventura di un soldato" segment directed by Nino Manfredi)
- Tiko and the Shark, 1964 (co-wrote screenplay directed by Folco Quilici)

== Film and television adaptations ==
- The Nonexistent Knight by Pino Zac, 1969 (Italian animated film based on the novel)
- Amores dificiles by Ana Luisa Ligouri, 1983 (13' Mexican short)
- L'Aventure d'une baigneuse by Philippe Donzelot, 1991 (14' French short based on The Adventure of a Bather in Difficult Loves )
- Fantaghirò by Lamberto Bava, 1991 (TV adaptation based on Fanta-Ghirò the Beautiful in Italian Folktales)
- Palookaville by Alan Taylor, 1995 (American film based on Theft in a Cake Shop, Desire in November, and Transit Bed)
- Solidarity by Nancy Kiang, 2006 (10' American short)
- Conscience by Yu-Hsiu Camille Chen, 2009 (10' Australian short)
- La Luna by Enrico Casarosa, 2011 (American short loosely based on "The Distance of the Moon" from Cosmicomics)

== Films on Calvino ==
- Damian Pettigrew, Lo specchio di Calvino, 2012. Co-produced by Arte France, Italy's Ministero per i Beni e le Attività Culturali, and the National Film Board of Canada, the feature-length docufiction stars Neri Marcorè as the Italian writer alongside distinguished literary critic Pietro Citati. The film also uses in-depth interviews conducted at Calvino's Rome residence a year before his death in 1985 and rare footage from RAI, INA (Institut national de l'audiovisuel), and BBC television archives. The 52-minute French version titled, Dans la peau d'Italo Calvino ("Being Italo Calvino"), was broadcast by Arte France on 19 December 2012 and Sky Arte (Italy) on 14 October 2013.

== Legacy ==
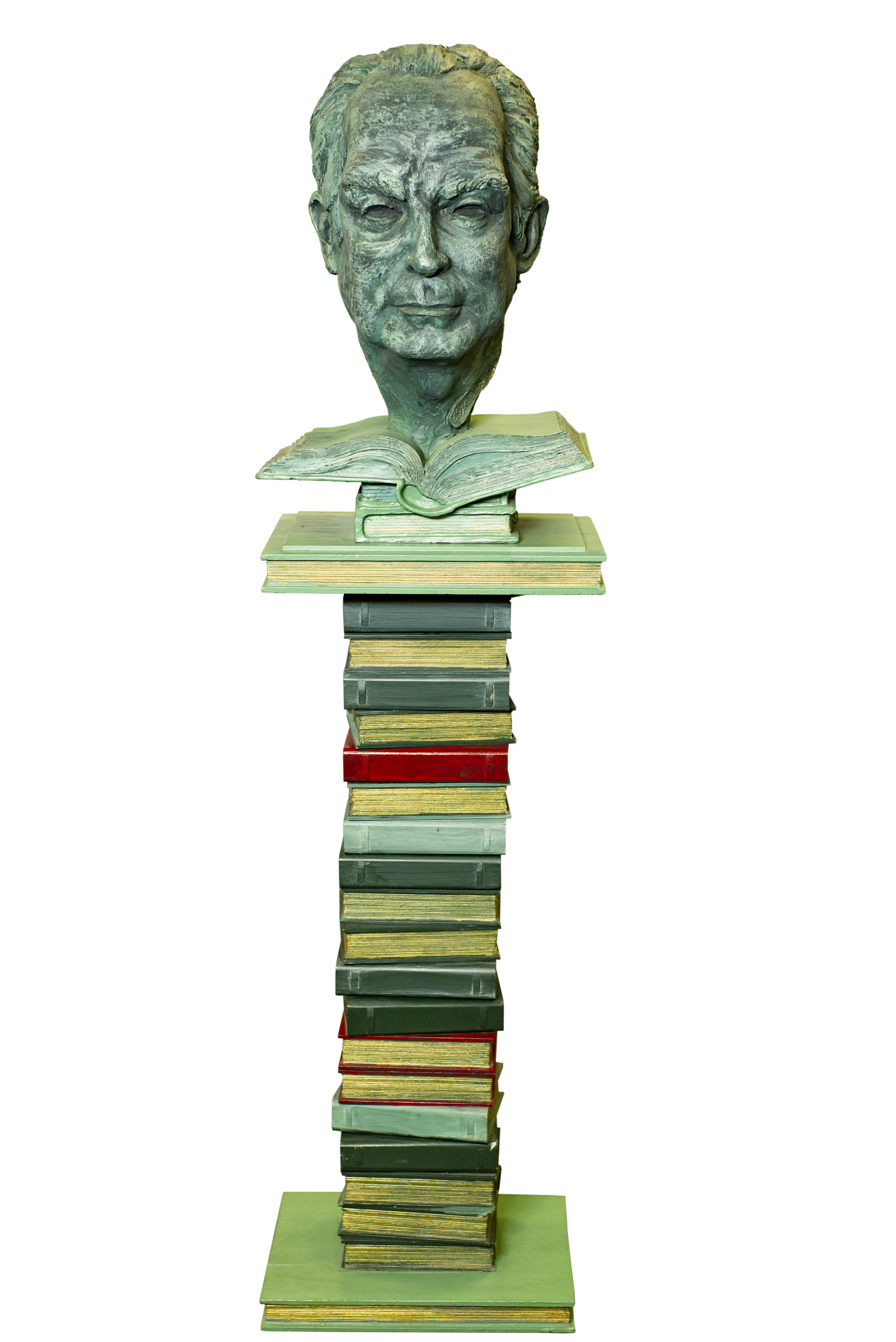
Calvino bust in Mexico

The Scuola Italiana Italo Calvino, an Italian curriculum school in Moscow, Russia, is named after him. A crater on the planet Mercury, Calvino, and a main-belt asteroid, 22370 Italocalvino, are also named after him. Salt Hill Journal and University of Louisville award annually the Italo Calvino Prize "for a work of fiction written in the fabulist experimental style of Italo Calvino".

Kai Nieminen (b. 1953) wrote his flute concerto (2001) based on the story of Mr. Palomar. The text was written to the dedicatee, Patrick Gallois.

== Awards ==
- 1946 – l'Unità Prize (shared with Marcello Venturi) for the short story, Minefield (Campo di mine)
- 1947 – Riccione Prize for The Path to the Nest of Spiders
- 1952 – Saint-Vincent Prize
- 1957 – Viareggio Prize for The Baron in the Trees
- 1959 – Bagutta Prize
- 1960 – Salento Prize for Our Ancestors
- 1963 – International Charles Veillon Prize for The Watcher
- 1970 – Asti Prize
- 1974 - Prix Médicis étranger for Invisible Cities
- 1972 – Feltrinelli Prize for Invisible Cities
- 1976 – Austrian State Prize for European Literature
- 1982 – World Fantasy Award – Life Achievement

== Sources ==
=== Primary sources ===
- Calvino, Italo. Adam, One Afternoon (trans. Archibald Colquhoun, Peggy Wright). London: Minerva, 1992.
- —. The Castle of Crossed Destinies (trans. William Weaver). London: Secker & Warburg, 1977
- —. Cosmicomics (trans. William Weaver). London: Picador, 1993.
- —. The Crow Comes Last (Ultimo viene il corvo). Turin: Einaudi, 1949.
- —. Difficult Loves. Smog. A Plunge into Real Estate (trans. William Weaver, Donald Selwyn Carne-Ross). London: Picador, 1985.
- —. Hermit in Paris (trans. Martin McLaughlin). London: Jonathan Cape, 2003.
- —. If on a winter's night a traveller (trans. William Weaver). London: Vintage, 1998. ISBN 0-919630-23-5
- —. Invisible Cities (trans. William Weaver). London: Secker & Warburg, 1974.
- —. Italian Fables (trans. Louis Brigante). New York: Collier, 1961. (50 tales)
- —. Italian Folk Tales (trans. Sylvia Mulcahy). London: J.M. Dent & Sons, 1975. (24 tales)
- —. Italian Folktales (trans. George Martin). Harmondsworth: Penguin, 1980. (complete 200 tales)
- —. Marcovaldo or the Seasons in the City (trans. William Weaver). London: Minerva, 1993.
- —. Mr. Palomar (trans. William Weaver). London: Vintage, 1999.
- —. Our Ancestors (trans. A. Colquhoun). London: Vintage, 1998.
- —. The Path to the Nest of Spiders (trans. Archibald Colquhoun). Boston: Beacon, 1957.
- —. The Path to the Spiders' Nests (trans. A. Colquhoun, revised by Martin McLaughlin). London: Jonathan Cape, 1993.
- —. t zero (trans. William Weaver). New York: Harcourt, Brace & World, 1969.
- —. The Road to San Giovanni (trans. Tim Parks). New York: Vintage International, 1993.
- —. Six Memos for the Next Millennium (trans. Patrick Creagh). New York: Vintage International, 1993.
- —. The Watcher and Other Stories (trans. William Weaver). New York: Harcourt, Brace & Company, 1971.

=== Secondary sources ===
- Barenghi, Mario, and Bruno Falcetto. Romanzi e racconti di Italo Calvino. Milano: Mondadori, 1991.
- Bernardini Napoletano, Francesca. I segni nuovi di Italo Calvino. Rome: Bulzoni, 1977.
- Bonura, Giuseppe. Invito alla lettura di Calvino. Milan: U. Mursia, 1972.
- Calvino, Italo. Uno scrittore pomeridiano: Intervista sull'arte della narrativa a cura di William Weaver e Damian Pettigrew con un ricordo di Pietro Citati. Rome: minimum fax, 2003. ISBN 978-88-87765-86-1.
- Corti, Maria. 'Intervista: Italo Calvino' in Autografo 2 (October 1985): 47–53.
- Di Carlo, Franco. Come leggere I nostri antenati. Milan: U. Mursia, 1958. (1998 ISBN 978-88-425-2215-7).
- McLaughlin, Martin. Italo Calvino. Edinburgh: Edinburgh University Press, 1998. ISBN 978-0-7486-0735-8 (pb. ISBN 978-0-7486-0917-8).
- Weiss, Beno. Understanding Italo Calvino. Columbia: University of South Carolina Press, 1993. ISBN 978-0-87249-858-7.
- Anderson, Helen Victoria. Historical and detective fiction in Italy 1950-2006 : Calvino, Malerba and Mancinelli. Oxford University, 2010.

=== Online sources ===
- Italo Calvino at Emory University Online Resources and Links
- Outside the Town of Malbork Archived 16 October 2018 at the Wayback Machine A Site for Italo Calvino
- The Words that Failed Archived 16 August 2011 at the Wayback Machine Calvino on Che Guevara
- http://atlantecalvino.unige.ch/ Archived 25 August 2019 at the Wayback Machine visualisation of Calvino's work by
