= 1974 in Italian television =

This is a list of Italian television related events of 1974.

== Events ==
- January 6 : Gigliola Cinquetti wins Canzonissima with Alle porte del sole.
- March 9: Iva Zanicchi wins, for the third time, the Sanremo Festival with Ciao cara, come stai?
- May 13: On the nightly news, the Minister of the Interior Paolo Emilio Taviani announces the results of the referendum and the victory of the NO (the pro-divorce). During the referendum campaign, RAI maintained an attitude of exasperated prudence, going so far as to censor a scene from David Copperfield in which a character offers the divorce to his wife.
- June 7: on the 1974 FIFA World Cup's eve, the Minister of Communication Giuseppe Togni orders the dismantling of the implants broadcasting the signals of RSI and TV-Koper (which unlike RAI, broadcast the matches in color). In the same year, the Minister often takes similar sanctions against the Italian private channels, on cable or on air.
- July 7: the Constitutional Court authorizes the broadcast on Italy of the foreign channels and the private cable channels. The RAI monopoly over broadcasting on air is confirmed.
- August 7: in Monaco, Telemontecarlo begins broadcasting. Initially aimed to the Italian-speaking people in the principality, soon it is also broadcast in Italy. It becomes a new competitor for the RAI monopoly.
- August 10: first broadcasting by air of an Italian private channel; in Florence, Firenze libera airs a documentary about the 30th anniversary of the city's liberation. Firenze libera is immediately sanctioned by the Minister Togni. Within the same year, other pirate television channels follows Firenze libera's example. They include Telesuperba in Genoa (the first in color) and TV QUI in Modena (again active by now).
- September 18: Ettore Bernabei resigns as RAI general director, and is replaced by Michele Principe. Bernabei was in charge since 1961 and he was considered the enlightened despot of the estate.
- September 22: The first profanities in Italian TV. In Sorrento, the free diver Enzo Maiorca fails a record on live TV, because of a collision with a misguided photographer. He then resurfaces swearing; his expletives are broadcast by the RAI cameras, before the sound is interrupted.
- September 24: in Milan, Telemilanocavo, a cable TV for the Milano Due residents, begins broadcasting; in the future, it will be the core of the Silvio Berlusconi's media empire.
- December 24: RAI broadcasts in world vision the opening of the Holy door by Pope Paul VI, from the 1975 Jubilee; the direction is handled by Franco Zeffirelli.

== Debuts ==
=== Serials ===
- Il commissario De Vincenzi (The superintendent De Vincenzi) – by Mario Ferreri, with Paolo Stoppa, from the Augusto De Angelis' novels; detective serial, set in Italy under the fascism.
- Philo Vance – by Marco Leto, from the S. S. Van Dine's novels, with Giorgio Albertazzi in the title role.

=== Variety ===
- Un peu d'amour... d'amitié... et beaucoup de musique (on Telemontecarlo) – talk show about music, hosted by Jocelyn and Sophie.

=== News and educational ===
- A tavola alle sette - one of first Italian cooking shows, hosted by the actress Ave Ninchi and the gastronome Vincenzo Buonassisi.
- Settimo giorno (Seventh day) – cultural magazine, care of Enzo Siciliano; 2 seasons.
- Cronaca - Investigative journalism column, realized in collaboration with trade unions and civil society associations; lasted until 1985.

== Television shows ==
=== Drama and comedy ===
- Roma rivuole Cesare (Rome needs again Caesar) – by Miklos Jancso; parable about the power and the revolution, set in the Roman Numidia.
- Milarepa by Liliana Cavani
- Stregone di città (City sorcerer) – by Gianfranco Bettetini, wirh Giulio Brogi, Rada Rassimov and Lucilla Morlacchi; the life of Giuseppe Parisi (a really existed Milanese priest healer) told by two women he cured.
- Un certo Marconi – biopic by Sandro Bolchi, realized for the centenary of the great inventor's birth, with the famous voice actor Gualtiero De Angelis (debuting as protagonist) in the title role.
- Abramo in Africa, by Gianni Barcelloni, from a script by Alberto Moravia and Dacia Maraini; the myth of the binding of Isaacs is transposed in the modern Africa.
- Bronte: cronaca di un massacro che i libri di storia non hanno raccontato (Chronicle of a slaughter never told by the schoolbooks) by Florestano Vancini, with Ivo Garrani and Mariano Rigillio; the story of a bllody peasant revolt in Sicilia, at the time of the Expedition of the Thousand, repressed with the same harshness by Nino Bixio's Garibaldins. The movie was very controversial for is negative vision of Risorgimento and was broadcast by RAI just four years after its production.
- L’acqua cheta (The quiet water) – operetta with a Florentine setting by Augusto Novelli and Giuseppe Pietri, directed by Vito Molinari, with Gianrico Tedeschi, Renzo Montagnani and Daniela Goggi.

=== Miniseries ===
==== History ====
- Il giovane Garibaldi (Young man Garibaldi) – by Franco Rossi, with Maurizio Merli (Giuseppe Garibaldi), Francisco Rabal (Bento Goncalves da Silva) and Philippe Leroy, in two episodes; the youth adventures in Brasil of the Italian patriot.
- Cartesius – by Roberto Rosselini, with Ugo Cardea in the title role, in two episodes; last of the didactical biographies of philosophers by Rossellini.
- Accadde a Lisbona (It happened in Lisbon) by Daniele D’Anza, with Paolo Stoppa as Alves dos Reis, in three episodes; the incredible but true story of one of the greatest swindles ever performed.
- L’assassinio dei fratelli Rosselli (The Rosselli brothers’ killing) – by Silvio Maestranzi, with Renzo Palmer (Carlo Rosselli) and Nando Gazzolo (Eugenie Deloncle), in three episodes.
- Moses the lawgiver – by Gianfranco de Bosio, with Burt Lancaster in the title role, script by Anthony Burgess, in 7 episodes; shot in colors, it's the most sumptuous RAI production of the year, realized in collaboration with ITC:
- Quaranta giorni di libertà (Forty days of freedom) – by Leandro Castellani, script by Luciano Codignola, in 3 episodes; celebratory miniseries for the thirty anniversary of the Free Ossola State, the most famous of the Italian partisan republics.

==== Literature ====
- Anna Karenina – by Sandro Bolchi, with Lea Massari in the title role and Sergio Fantoni as Konstantin Levin, from the Lev Tolstoy's novel (published just a century before), in eight episodes. Last of the great RAI “dramatized novels”; it gets a huge public success, in spite of its theatrical and outdated style, thanks moreover to the Massari's interpretation.
- Malombra – by Raffaele Meloni, with Giulio Bosetti and Marina Malfatti, from the Fogazzaro's novel, script by Diego Fabbri, in 4 episodes.
- L’edera (The Ivy)– by Giuseppe Fina, from Grazia Deledda's novel, with Nicoletta Rizzi and Ugo Pagliai; a Sardinia girl renounces to love to expiate a murder.
- Nel mondo di Alice (In the Alice's world) – by Guido Stagnaro, from the Lewis Carroll's novel, with Milena Vukotic as Alice, in four episodes.
- Jack London, l’avventura del grande Nord (Great North's adventure) – by Angelo d’Alessandro, with Orso Maria Guerrini in the title role; 7 episodes, for children. The Klondike of the gold rush is recreated in Yugoslavia.

==== Mystery ====
- Il dipinto (The painting) – by Domenico Campana, in 2 episodes.
- Ho incontrato un’ombra (I met a shadow) – by Daniele D’Anza, with Giancarlo Zanetti and Beba Loncar, in 4 episodes.
- L’olandese scomparso (The Dutchman disappeared) – by Alberto Negrin, with Giuseppe Pambieri; in Venice, the disappearances of a man (an ecologist oceanographer) and of a painting (Giorgione's The Tempest) turn out to be linked.

==== Humor ====
- Sì, vendetta... (Yes, vengeance) – by Mario Ferrero, script and interpreted by Franca Valeri, in four episodes. Through the history of an upper class widow and of her hippy daughter, the author-actress makes irony about the changes in progress of the Italian society.

=== Serials ===
- Nucleo centrale investigativo (Central investigative unit) – by Vittorio Armentano, with Roberto Herlitzka; procedural about Guardia di Finanza.

=== Variety ===
- Alle sette della sera (At seven in the evening) – musical show, hosted by Christian De Sica.
- Il mangianote (The notes-eater) – musical show, hosted by Quartetto Cetra.
- Milleluci (A thousand lights) – by Antonello Falqui, with Mina and Raffaella Carrà. It's a review of the various form of entertainment, from the radio to the musical comedy, and is remembered as the only show where the two greatest female stars of Italian TV had worked together. The show is the most seen TV program of the year, with 23.600.000 viewers.
- Sabato sera dalle nove alle dieci (Saturday evening, from nine to ten) – by Giancarlo Nicotra and Ugo Gregoretti. The images of a variety with Gigi Proietti are alternated with the stories of four people (a thief, Dr. Jekyll, a playboy and a tramp, all played by the same Proietti) looking at the show in television.
- Tante scuse (Many apologies) – by Romolo Siena, with Raimondo Vianello and Sandra Mondaini, and Ricchi e Poveri as constant guests; the show parodies the traditional RAI variety, pretending to display its own backstage, marked by continuous troubles and quarrels. The formula will be repeated in many other spectacles of the couple.
- Napolammore – by Giancarlo Nicotra, with Massimo Ranieri; show about Naples’ culture and music,
- Ritratto di un giovane qualsias (Portrait of an average young man) - by Giancarlo Nicotra, musical show with Claudio Baglioni.
- Una voce con Claudio Villa, tribute-show for Villa's thirty years of career.
- Canzonissima 1974 – by Eros Macchi, hosted by Raffaella Carrà, with Topo Gigio, Cochi e Renato and the debuting Massimo Boldi as constant guests; won by the duo Wess and Dori Ghezzi, with Un corpo e un anima. Last edition of the show, whose formula, In spite of some renewal attempts (as the contest reserved to the folk music and won by Tony Santagata), appears by then worm out to the public.
- Le fiabe dell’albero (The fables of the tree) – by Lino Procacci; fairy-tales told by renowned stage actors.

=== News and educational ===
- Incontri 1974 (Encounters 1974)
- Diario segreto di Amarcord (Amarcord's secret diary), by Maurizio Mein and Lilliana Betti; documentary about the backstage of the Federico Fellini's masterpiece.
- A carte scoperte, (With card exposed) interviews with important international personalitie (Honda, Ceausescu, Speer, Wiesenthal), ideated by Carlo Ponti. Significant is that of Mario Soldati to Haile Selassie, realized on the eve of the emperor's deposition.
- Alì vs. Foreman, la notte di Kinshasa reportage by Gianni Minà about the rumble in the jungle.

== Ending this year ==
- Rischiatutto

== Deaths ==
- 3 January: Gino Cervi, 73, actor, protagonist, in TV, of several pieces and of the serial Le inchieste del commissario Maigret.
- 29 March: Andrea Checchi, 57, character actor in many RAI fictions.
- 17 July: Gigi Ghirotti, 53, journalist, who took bravely on television his experience of terminal cancer patient.
- 13 November: Vittorio De Sica, 73, actor and director.
