= Vincenzo Buonassisi =

Italian journalist, writer, gastronome, and lyricist

Vincenzo Buonassisi (7 January 1918 - 25 January 2004) was an Italian journalist, writer, and gastronome.

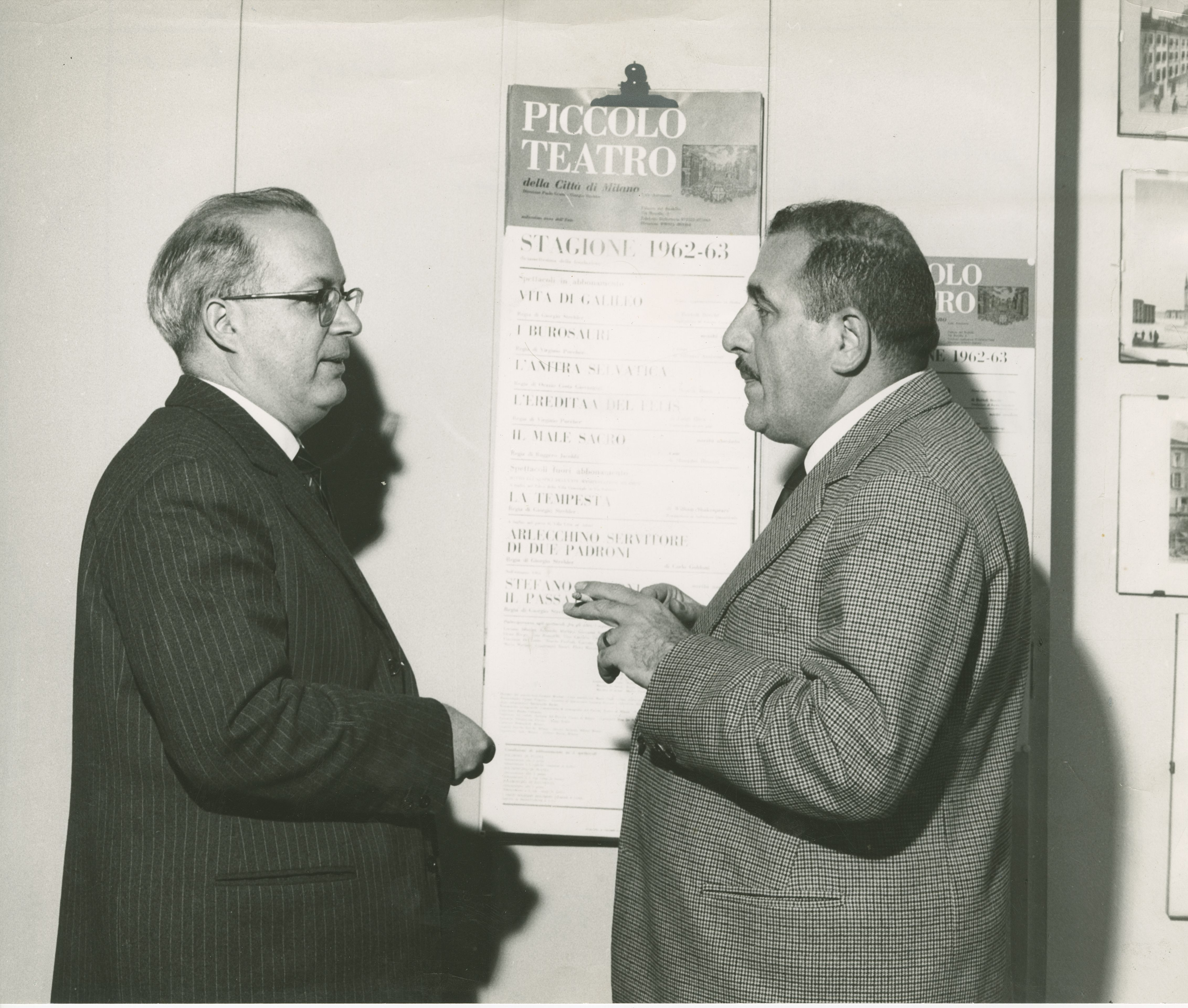
The theater director Paolo Grassi (right), during an interview with the Corriere della Sera journalist Vincenzo Buonassisi at the Piccolo Teatro (Milan)

== Early life ==
Buonassisi was born in L'Aquila on 7 January 1918 but grew up in Apulia. He moved with his family to Rome at the age of six. He served in the Italian military during the Second World War, seeing combat in North Africa before being captured. As a prisoner of war (POW) in the United States Buonassisi lived at POW camps in Texas, Mississippi, and Arkansas. He later fondly remembered the food he had access to in the American POW camps, especially compared to Italian military service.

Buonassisi initially pursued law, studying to be a lawyer, but eventually became a journalist instead.

== Journalism and writing ==
As a journalist Buonassisi primarily wrote for Corriere della Sera and La Stampa, often under the pen name Falstaff. Buonassisi became famous for his food coverage however he also covered travel, music, opera, and television. He was the first person to have the position of dedicated food and wine correspondent at a major Italian newspaper.

In 1977 the New York Times described Buonassisi as Italy's "reigning King of Pasta" and positively reviewed his book Pasta.

Buonassisi published non-fiction books about food and wine as well as novels. He had a popular cooking program on Italian television, attracting more than a million viewers.

== Other ==
In 1953 Buonassisi became involved with Orio Vergano's Accademia italiana della cucina.

Buonassisi was also a painter and songwriter.

== Personal life ==
Buonassisi was married to Anna Presenti who was a co-author of many of his books.

== Views ==
Buonassisi's personal motto/credo was "History of food, history of man."

Buonassisi held that the dish of chicory and fava beans (chicoria e fava) was an aphrodisiac.

== Death ==
Buonassisi died on 25 January, 2004.

== See also ==
- Camp Hereford
- Sanremo Music Festival 1969
- Sanremo Music Festival 1968
- 1974 in Italian television
- L'arca di Noè (song)
- John Alcorn (artist)
