= Gianfranco Contini =

Italian philologist (1912–1990)

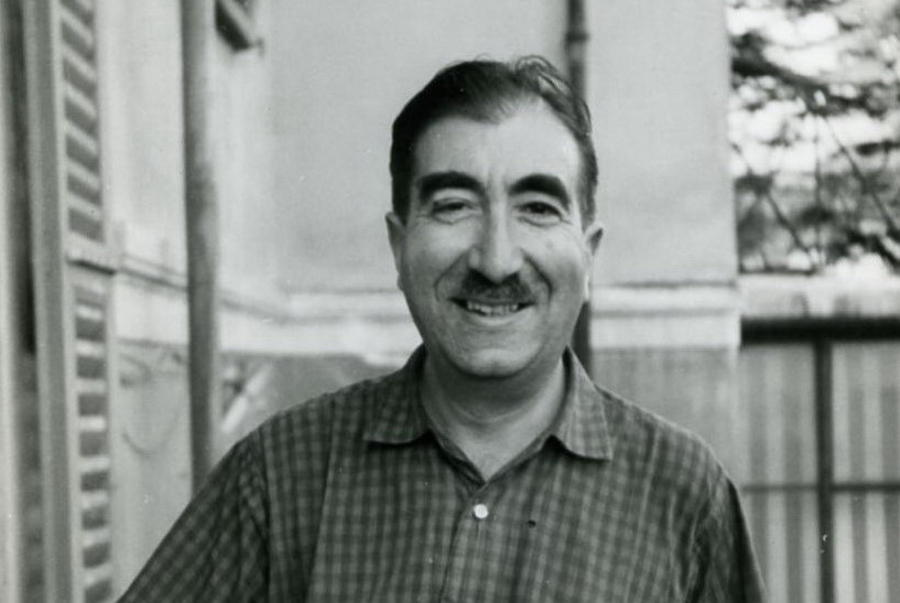
Gianfranco Contini

Gianfranco Contini (4 January 1912 – 1 February 1990) was an Italian academic and philologist.

He studied at the Collegio Mellerio Rosmini in Domodossola, then at the University of Pavia, where he graduated in 1933. Later, he studied also in Turin, where he met Giulio Einaudi, Massimo Mila, and Leone Ginzburg, who shortly after started the Einaudi publishing company. From 1934 to 1936, he lived in Paris, following Joseph Bédier's lessons, then he was called to teach in Florence and Pisa, where he became a contributor to "Letteratura", a literary magazine where he shared his views, among others, with Eugenio Montale, and where he began to collaborate with the Accademia della Crusca. In 1938, he was called to teach Romance Philology at the University of Freiburg, as a successor of Bruno Migliorini. Among his students, there have been the critics D'Arco Silvio Avalle and Dante Isella. After 20 years of brilliant academic activity, he was appointed at the University of Florence, and to the Scuola Normale Superiore di Pisa. He was also associated with the Académie des Inscriptions et Belles-Lettres. He directed the Centre of Philology Studies of the Accademia della Crusca, until March 1971. He belonged to the Accademia dei Lincei, and was President of the Società Dantesca Italiana. In 1987, he went back to his hometown where he died three years later.

== Selected bibliography ==
- Dante Alighieri, Rime (editor), 1939
- Poeti del Duecento (editor), 1960
- Letteratura dell'Italia unita 1861-1968 (editor), 1968
- Francesco De Sanctis, Scelta di scritti critici e ricordi (editor), 1969
- Varianti e altra linguistica, 1970 (collection literary essays 1938-68)
- Un'idea di Dante, 1970
- Carlo Emilio Gadda, La cognizione del dolore (introduction), 1970
- Altri esercizi, 1972 (collection of literary essays, 1942–71)
- Roberto Longhi, Da Cimabue a Morandi (editor), 1973
- Esercizi di lettura sopra autori contemporanei con un’appendice su testi non contemporanei, 1974 (partially published before as Un anno di letteratura, 1942)
- Una lunga fedeltà. Scritti su Eugenio Montale, 1974
- Francesco Petrarca, Canzoniere (introduction), 1975
- Letteratura italiana del Quattrocento (editor), 1976
- Letteratura italiana delle origini (editor), 1978
- Eugenio Montale, L'opera in versi (editor), 1980
- Letteratura italiana del Risorgimento 1789-1861 (editor), 1986
- Ultimi esercizî ed elzeviri, 1987 (collection of literary essays, 1968–87)
- Antologia leopardiana (editor), 1988
- Carlo Emilio Gadda, Lettere a Gianfranco Contini a cura del destinatario 1934-67, 1988 (letters edited as addressee)
- Quarant'anni di amicizia: scritti su Carlo Emilio Gadda (1934-88), 1989
- Breviario di ecdotica, 1990
- Poeti del Dolce stil novo (editor), 1991
- Racconti della Scapigliatura piemontese (editor), 1992
- La letteratura italiana Otto-Novecento (editor), 1998
- Postremi esercizi ed elzeviri, 1998 (latest collection of essays)
- Poesie, Pietro Montorfani ed., 2010
- Massimo Colella, Gianfranco Contini e Francesco Orlando: un’idea di Dante, un’idea della letteratura, in «Xenia. Trimestrale di Letteratura e Cultura» (Genova), IV, 3, 2019, pp. 20–32.
