= Carlo Emilio Gadda =

Italian writer and poet (1893–1973)

- Carlo Emilio Gadda in the 1960s
- Born: 14 November 1893; Milan, Kingdom of Italy
- Died: 21 May 1973 (aged 79); Rome, Italy
- Occupation: Writer
- Writing career
- Period: 1932–1973
- Genres: Fiction, essays, poetry
- Notable awards: Bagutta Prize, Viareggio Prize
- Literary movement: Modernism, Postmodernism, Lombard line

Carlo Emilio Gadda (Italian pronunciation: [ˈkarlo eˈmiːljo ˈɡadda]; 14 November 1893 – 21 May 1973) was an Italian writer and poet. He belongs to the tradition of the language innovators, writers who played with the somewhat stiff standard pre-war Italian language, and added elements of dialects, technical jargon and wordplay.

== Biography ==
Gadda was a practising engineer from Milan, and he both loved and hated his job. Critics have compared him to other writers with a scientific background, such as Primo Levi, Robert Musil and Thomas Pynchon—a similar spirit of exactitude pervades some of Gadda's books. Among Gadda's styles and genres are baroque, expressionism and grotesque.

Carlo Emilio Gadda was born in Milan in 1893, and he was always intensely Milanese, although late in his life Florence and Rome also became an influence. Gadda's nickname is Il gran Lombardo, The Great Lombard: a reference to the famous lines 70-3 of Paradiso XVII, which predict the protection Dante would receive from Bartolomeo II della Scala of Verona during his exile from Florence: "Lo primo tuo refugio e 'l primo ostello / sarà la cortesia del gran Lombardo/ che 'n su la scala porta il santo uccello" ("Your first refuge and inn shall be the courtesy of the great Lombard, who bears on the ladder the sacred bird").

Gadda's father died in 1909, leaving the family in reduced economic conditions; Gadda's mother, however, never tried to adopt a more modest style of life. The paternal business ineptitude and the maternal obsession for keeping "face" and appearances turn up strongly in La cognizione del dolore.

He studied in Milan, and while studying at the Politecnico di Milano (a university specialized in engineering and architecture), he volunteered for World War I. During the war, he was a lieutenant of the Alpini corps and led a machine-gun team. He was taken prisoner with his squad during the battle of Caporetto in October 1917; his brother was killed in a plane—and this death features prominently in La cognizione del dolore. Gadda, who was a fervent nationalist at the time, was deeply humiliated by the months he had to spend in a German POW camp.

After the war, in 1920, Gadda finally graduated. He practised as an engineer until 1935, spending three of those years in Argentina. Among Gadda's less well-known achievements is the construction, as an engineer, of the Vatican Power Station for Pius XI. The country at that time was experiencing a booming economy, and Gadda used the experience for the fictional South American-cum-Brianza setting of La Cognizione del Dolore. After that, in the 1940s, he dedicated himself to literature. These were the years of fascism, which found him a grumbling and embittered pessimist. With age, his bitterness and misanthropy somewhat intensified.

In Eros e Priapo (1945) Gadda analyzes the collective phenomena that favoured the rise of Italian Fascism, the Italian fascination with Benito Mussolini. It explains Fascism as an essentially bourgeois movement. Eros e Priapo was refused in 1945 by a magazine for its allegedly obscene content, and would only be published for the first time in 1967, by Garzanti. The 1967 edition, however, was expurgated of some of what Gadda considered the most heavy satiric strokes. The unexpurgated original 1945 edition will be published in 2013.

In 1946, the magazine Letteratura published, in five episodes, the crime novel Quer pasticciaccio brutto de via Merulana, which was translated into English as That Awful Mess on Via Merulana. It experiments heavily with language, borrowing a great deal from several Italian dialects. It is also notable for not telling whodunnit at the end.

There is some debate amongst scholars as regards Gadda's sexual orientation. In his book on the homosexual painter Filippo De Pisis, writer Giovanni Comisso (also gay) described an evening in which he and De Pisis went for a beer with Gadda and philologist Gianfranco Contini, during the course of which Gadda asked De Pisis to summarize the various types of "irregular" love. According to Italo Calvino (Introduction to That Awful Mess on the Via Merulana, 1984) Gadda was "a bachelor oppressed by a paralyzing shyness in any female presence." Certainly, his work demonstrates a strongly subversive attitude towards bourgeois values, expressed above all by a discordant use of language interspersed with dialect, academic and technical jargon and dirty talk. This is particularly interesting as the criticism of the bourgeois life comes, as it were, from the inside, with the former engineer cutting a respectable figure in genteel poverty.

Gadda kept writing until his death, in 1973. The most important critic of Gadda was Gianfranco Contini.

In 2017, the Swedish Academy published after 50 years the secret list of nominations for the 1966 Nobel Prize for Literature. Gadda was nominated for the first time by the Italo-American linguist and polyglot Mario Andrew Pei.

== Literary work ==
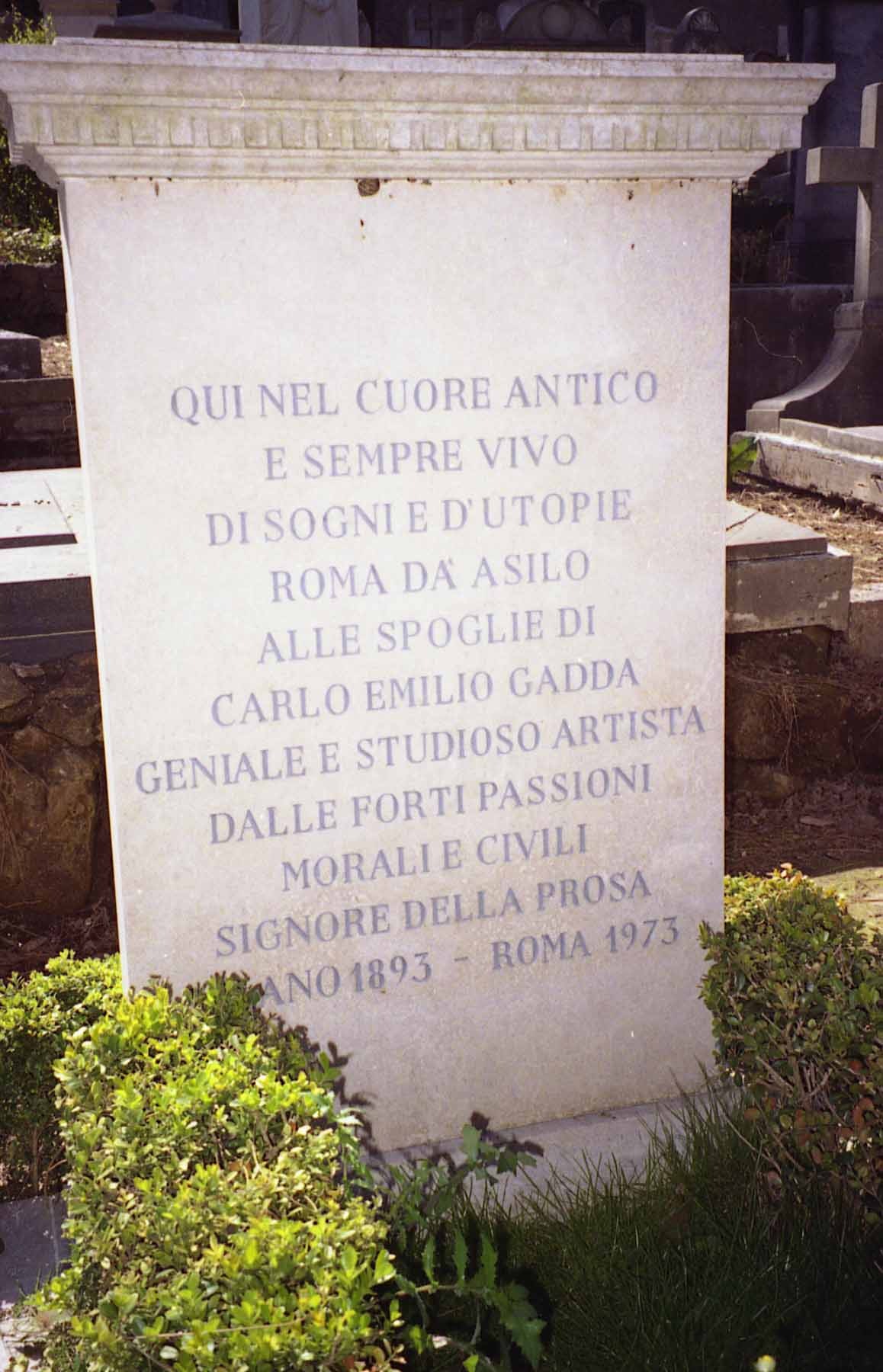
Gadda's grave in the Non-Catholic Cemetery. Photo by Massimo Consoli.

- La madonna dei filosofi (1931), translated into English as The Philosophers' Madonna (Atlas Press, 2008) by Antony Melville.
- Il castello di Udine (1934)
- Le meraviglie d'Italia (1939)
- Gli anni (1943)
- L'Adalgisa (1944, short stories)
- Il primo libro delle favole (1952, collection of tales in a mock-antique style)
- Novelle dal ducato in fiamme (1953, short stories)
- I sogni e la folgore (1955)
- Giornale di guerra e di prigionia (1955), a diary covering Gadda's years in World War I, including his military actions in the Passo Tonale area and his months as a prisoner in Austria
- Quer pasticciaccio brutto de via Merulana (1946, 1957), translated into English as That Awful Mess on Via Merulana (George Braziller, 1965) by William Weaver.
- I viaggi e la morte (1958)
- Verso la Certosa (1961)
- Accoppiamenti giudiziosi (1963)
- La cognizione del dolore (1963), translated into English as Acquainted with Grief (George Braziller, 1969) by William Weaver; republished as The Experience of Pain (Penguin, 2017) translated by Richard Dixon.
- I Luigi di Francia (1964), a summary of French history, through the distorting and corrosive outlook of the author
- Eros e Priapo (1967)
- La meccanica (1970)
- Novella seconda (1971)
- Meditazione milanese (1974)
- Le bizze del capitano in congedo (1981)
- Il palazzo degli ori (1983)
- Racconto italiano di ignoto del novecento (1983)
- Azoto e altri scritti di divulgazione scientifica (1986, collection of scientific prose)
- Taccuino di Caporetto (1991)
- Opere (1988–93)

== Bibliography ==
- Ferdinando Amigoni, La più semplice macchina, Lettura freudiana del "Pasticciaccio", Bologna, il Mulino, 1995.
- Alba Andreini-Marziano Guglielminetti, Marziano, eds, Carlo Emilio Gadda. La coscienza infelice, Milano, Guerini, 1996.
- Alberto Arbasino, L'Ingegnere in blu, Milano, Adelphi, 2008.
- Carla Benedetti, Una trappola di parole. Lettura del "Pasticciaccio", Pisa, ETS Editrice, 1987.
- Robert S. Dombroski, Creative Entanglements, Gadda and the Baroque, Toronto, University of Toronto Press, 1999.
- Ernesto Ferrero, Invito alla lettura di Carlo Emilio Gadda, Milano, Mursia. 1987.
- Piero Gadda Conti, Le confessioni di Carlo Emilio Gadda, Milano, Pan, 1974.
- Julius Goldmann: Gaddas Mailand. Ein Beitrag zur Großstadtliteratur., Heidelberg, Winter 2018, ISBN 978-3-8253-6652-0.
- Paola Italia, Glossario di Carlo Emilio Gadda "milanese". Da "La meccanica" a "L'Adalgisa", Alessandria, Edizioni dell'Orso, 1998.
- Martha Kleinhans, «Satura" und "pasticcio". Formen und Funktionen der Bildlichkeit im Werk Carlo Emilio Gaddas, Tübingen, Max Niemeyer Verlag, 2005.
- Angelo R. Dicuonzo, L’ossessione della frode. Socioanalisi del dolore nella "Cognizione" di Gadda, Bologna, Il Mulino, 2021, ISBN 978-88-15-29434-0.
- Jean-Paul Manganaro, Le baroque et l'ingénieur. Essai sur l'écriture de Carlo Emilio Gadda, Paris, éditions de Seuil, 1994.
- Realino Marra, La cognizione del delitto. Reato e "macchina della giustizia" nel "Pasticciaccio" di Gadda, "Materiali per una storia della cultura giuridica", XL-1, 2010, 157–83.
- Realino Marra, Tra due guerre. Considerazioni sul pensiero politico di Gadda, in "Giornale di storia costituzionale", 23, 2012, 265–76.
- Giuseppe Papponetti, Gadda – D'Annunzio e il lavoro italiano, Roma, Fondazione Ignazio Silone, 2002.
- Walter Pedullà, Carlo Emilio Gadda. Il narratore come delinquente, Milano, Rizzoli, 1997.
- Federica G. Pedriali, Altre carceri d'invenzione. Studi gaddiani, Ravenna, Longo, 2007.
- Ezio Raimondi, Barocco moderno. Roberto Longhi e Carlo Emilio Gadda, Milano, Mondadori, 2003.
- Cristina Savettieri, La trama continua. Storia e forme del romanzo di Gadda, Pisa, ETS, 2008.
- Maria Antonietta Terzoli, ed, Le lingue di Gadda, Atti del Convegno di Basilea 10–12 dicembre 1993, Roma, Salerno Editrice, 1995.
- Paola Travaglini, Una precipite diavoleria. Gadda tra metonimia e metafora, Catania, Il Carrubo, 2013.
- Caterina Verbaro, La cognizione della pluralità. Letteratura e conoscenza in Carlo Emilio Gadda, Firenze, Le Lettere, 2005.
- Antonio Zollino, Il vate e l'ingegnere. D'Annunzio in Gadda, Pisa, ETS Editrice, 1998.
