= Giuseppe Berto =

Italian novelist and screenwriter

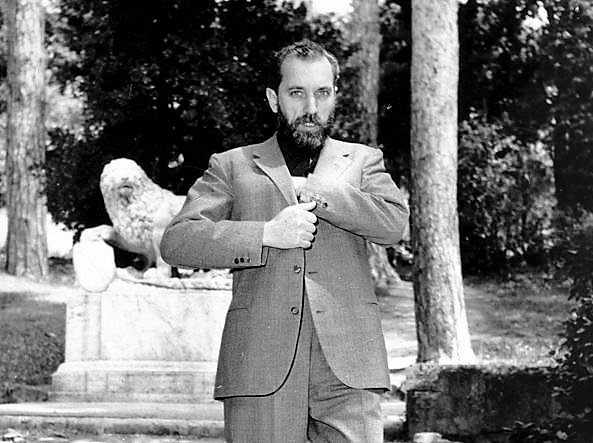
- Born: 27 December 1914; Mogliano Veneto, Italy
- Died: 1 November 1978 (aged 63); Rome, Italy
- Occupations: Novelist and screenwriter
- Years active: 1947–1978

Giuseppe Berto (27 December 1914 – 1 November 1978) was an Italian writer and screenwriter He is mostly known for his novels The Sky Is Red (Il cielo è rosso) and Incubus (Il male oscuro).

He was a prisoner at Camp Hereford from 1943 to 1946.

== Selected works ==
- Il cielo è rosso a novel, published in 1947, about a group of displaced teenagers during World War II (The Sky Is Red – translation by Angus Davidson)
- Opere di Dio short stories, published in 1948 (The Works of God and Other Stories – translation by Angus Davidson)
- Il brigante a novel, published in 1951 (The Brigand – translation by Angus Davidson)
- Il male oscuro a "novel of neurosis and psychoanalysis", which in 1964 won him the Viareggio Prize and the Campiello Prize (Incubus – translation by William Weaver)
- La cosa buffa a novel, published in 1966 (Antonio in Love – translation by William Weaver)
- Anonimo Veneziano a novel, published in 1971 (Anonymous Venetian – translation by Valerie Southorn)
- La Passione secondo noi stessi (The Passion According to Ourselves), a 1972 play (not translated into English)
- La gloria a novel, published in 1978, about Judas's betrayal of Jesus (not translated into English)

== Selected filmography ==
- Eleonora Duse (1947)
- La tua donna (1954)
- The Wanderers (1956)

== Screenwriter ==
Partial list of screenplays written by Berto:

- "Il cielo è rosso" (The Sky is Red), film directed by Claudio Gora
- "La cosa buffa" (The Funny Thing), film directed by Aldo Lado
- "Salvo D'Acquisto", film directed by Romolo Guerrieri (1974)
- "Il male oscuro" (Dark Illness), film directed by Mario Monicelli (1990)
- "Anonimo veneziano" (The Anonymous Venetian), film directed by Enrico Maria Salerno (1970)
- "Oh, Serafina!", film directed by Alberto Lattuada (1976)
