= Dark Illness =

- Directed by: Mario Monicelli
- Written by: Mario Monicelli; Suso Cecchi D'Amico; Tonino Guerra
- Based on: Incubus by Giuseppe Berto
- Produced by: Giovanni Di Clemente
- Starring: Giancarlo Giannini: Emmanuelle Seigner; Stefania Sandrelli
- Cinematography: Carlo Tafani
- Edited by: Ruggero Mastroianni
- Music by: Nicola Piovani
- Distributed by: Clemi Film
- Release date: 1990
- Running time: 113 minutes
- Country: Italy
- Language: Italian

Dark Illness (Italian: Il male oscuro, lit. 'The Obscure Illness') is a 1990 Italian drama film co-written and directed by Mario Monicelli. It is based on the novel Incubus by Giuseppe Berto. For this film Monicelli was awarded with a David di Donatello for Best Director.

== Plot ==
Giuseppe Marchi, dominated as a child by an authoritarian and despotic father in his uniform as a marshal of the carabinieri, grew up in a modest family, kept his studies thanks to great sacrifices and always frustrated by difficulties and anguish, now fifty years old, adds regret to his pains of not having had time to see his father on his deathbed again. Unsuccessful screenwriter, after living with Sylvaine, a French widow, he is seduced by a much younger girl whom he marries because she becomes pregnant. Giuseppe, who actually dreams of writing the novel of his life, is unable to get accepted a script about Judas, revisited with commercial intent. He always commits himself and often accuses excruciating pain. One day he finally decides to be examined in a clinic where they operate for a non-existent ulcer and appendicitis. Exhausted, he finally even attempts suicide. When his wife leaves with the baby to spend two months in Siusi, Giuseppe, forced into a bust recommended to him because he has a mobile kidney, remains in the Roman heat to try to write the first chapter of his autobiography. Even when he finally decides to join his wife in the Alps, his manias and phobias do not cease. Meanwhile, his script is rejected because the client, in trouble with the tax office, moves elsewhere, leaving Giuseppe, to repay his debt, some land cultivated with olive groves in Calabria. Finally, man entrusts himself to a psychoanalyst, whose response is easy and very quick: at the root of his existential evil there is the father figure and his conditioning and, now that he knows, everything appears clearer and he thinks of be healed. But at this point his wife reveals that she has been cheating on him for years. This being the case now, Giuseppe decides to go and live alone in a shack among the Calabrian olive trees, to hoe his vegetable garden, from where in the evening he sees, beyond the Strait of Messina, the lights of Sicily, the land where the father, who still hangs in the memory, was born and lived.

== Cast ==
- Giancarlo Giannini: Giuseppe Marchi
- Emmanuelle Seigner: Giuseppe's wife
- Stefania Sandrelli: Sylvaine
- Vittorio Caprioli: psychoanalyst
- Antonello Fassari: Dr. Giorgio Corsini
- Elisa Mainardi: analyst
- Néstor Garay: Giuseppe's father
- Rocco Papaleo: Neighbour of Giuseppe
- Franca Scagnetti: Neighbour of Giuseppe
