= That Awful Mess on Via Merulana =

1957 Italian novel

- Cover of the first (Italian) edition
- Author: Carlo Emilio Gadda
- Original title: Quer pasticciaccio brutto de via Merulana
- Translator: William Weaver
- Language: Italian; English (translation)
- Genre: Crime fiction
- Publisher: Garzanti (Italy); George Braziller (US)
- Publication date: 1957
- Publication place: Italy; New York City, New York (US)
- English publication date: 1965
- Media type: Print (hardcover)
- Pages: 388 (US)
- OCLC: 1154929569

That Awful Mess on Via Merulana (Romanesco: Quer pasticciaccio brutto de via Merulana) is an Italian novel by Carlo Emilio Gadda, first published in Italy by Garzanti in 1957. An English translation by William Weaver was published in 1965.

== Plot summary ==
Rome, Fascist Italy, 1927. Detective Francesco Ingravallo, known to friends as Don Ciccio, is called in to investigate the murder of Liliana Balducci, a well-to-do woman who happens to be a close friend. As Don Ciccio and his colleagues dig deeper into the grisly murder, the mechanics of the detective novel take a backseat to the wordplay and experimentation with which Gadda presents a panorama of life in early fascist Rome.

== Reception ==
That Awful Mess on Via Merulana was well received in Italian literary circles.
