= Story of a Humble Christian =

First edition (publ. Mondadori) Cover art: Giotto di Bondone, detail from The Miracle of the Spring, 1297-99

The Story of a Humble Christian (Italian: L'avventura d'un povero cristiano, 1968) is a historical play by the Italian writer Ignazio Silone, translated into English by William Weaver in 1970. It tells the story of Pope Celestine V.
