= Incubus (Berto novel) =

1964 novel by Giuseppe Berto

- Author: Giuseppe Berto
- Original title: Il male oscuro
- Translator: William Weaver
- Language: Italian
- Publisher: Rizzoli
- Publication date: 1964
- Publication place: Italy
- English publication date: 1966
- Pages: 416

Incubus (Italian: Il male oscuro, lit. 'The Dark Evil') is a 1964 novel by the Italian writer Giuseppe Berto. It received the Viareggio Prize and the Premio Campiello.

== Plot ==
The novel takes the form of a stream of consciousness, frequently with sentences that go on for many pages. It is about a man in his 60s who battles with guilt and exhaustion after the death of his father, with whom he had a complicated and dysfunctional relationship. There are memories about the father and about relationships with women. The protagonist talks about his own physical illnesses and visits a psychoanalyst.

== Reception ==
Kirkus Reviews compared the book to both "a confessional" and "a tirade". The critic called it "a bravura performance" with "wickedly funny lucidity", writing that its best moments are "uncommonly uncomfortable". Time called the book tiresome, with no artistic reason for its long sentences, and wrote that many readers can be expected to put it away after fewer than 100 pages. The critic wrote that it reminds readers why the influence of Sigmund Freud "sure is bad for writing".

The book was awarded the Viareggio Prize and the Premio Campiello.

== Adaptation ==
The book is the basis for the 1990 film Dark Illness directed by Mario Monicelli.
