= Camp Hereford =

- Prisoner of war camp
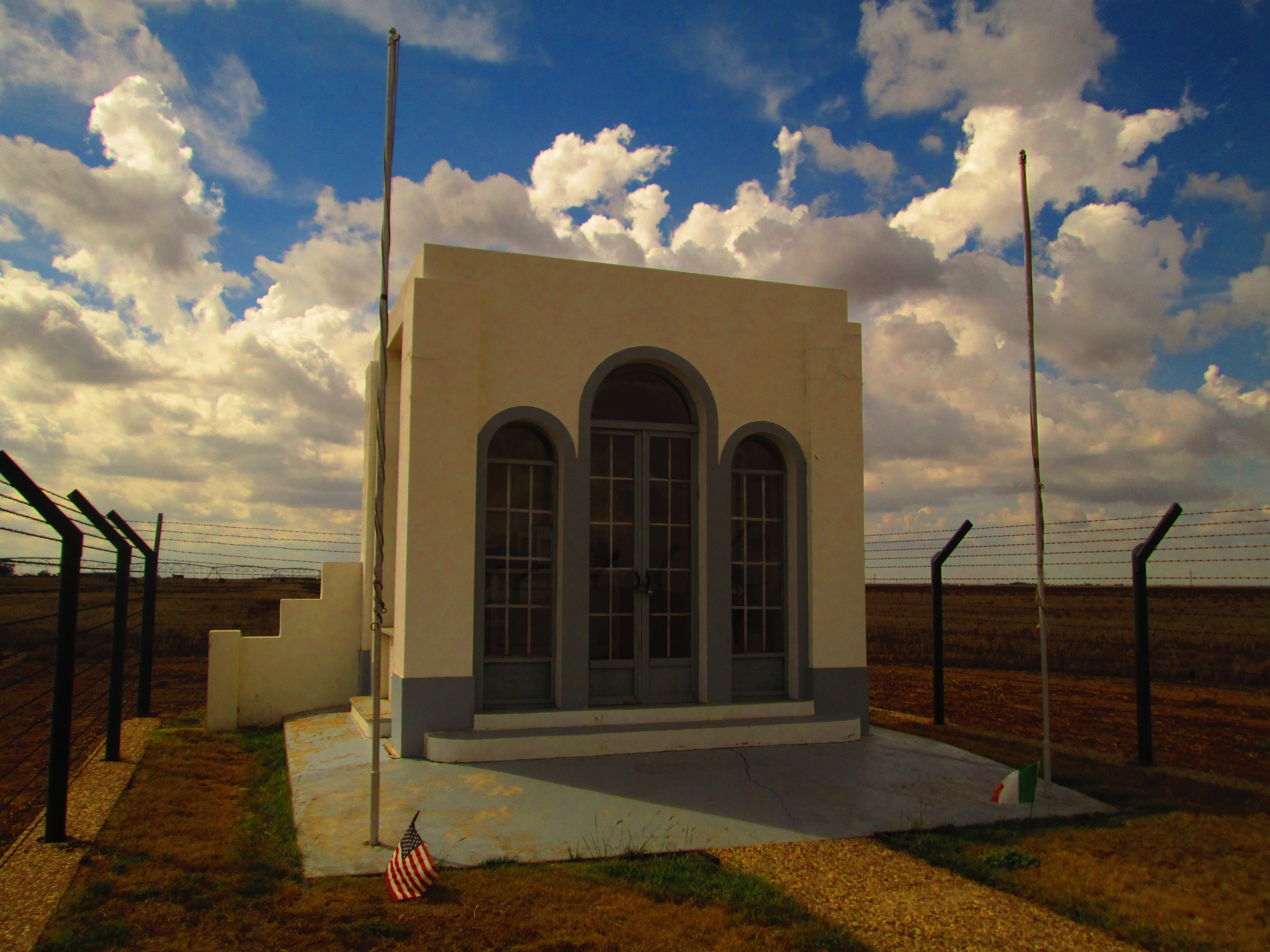
- Memorial chapel built by Italian prisoners of war at Camp Hereford

- Location within Texas
- Coordinates: 34°44.746′N 102°25.496′W
- Country: United States
- State: Texas
- Opened: 1943
- Closed: 1946
- Founded by: United States Army

Camp Hereford, the Hereford Internment Camp, or the Hereford Military Reservation and Reception Center was an American prisoner-of-war camp that housed Italian prisoners during World War II. The camp was located about 3 miles (4.83 km) south of Hereford, Texas, and was the second largest prisoner-of-war camp in the United States, capable of housing nearly 6,000 prisoners as well as 750 American military personnel. It was constructed in 1942 and began housing inmates in 1943. By February 1946 all prisoners of war had been repatriated and the camp was placed on the surplus list.

== History ==
=== Construction ===
In June 1942, the War Department authorized the building of Camp Hereford on a section of land along the border of Castro and Deaf Smith counties. The War Department purchased 330 acres (1.3 km^{2}) of farmland from Loyal B. Holland for $14,375, and bought a neighboring half-section of land from Walter N. Hodges for $16,475; ground was broken in July 1942. The 3,000-man camp was to be completed in November, but additions to the camp were requested and the completion date was pushed back to February 1943. The federal government awarded the building contract to the Russell J. Brydan Company of Dallas, with architectural design by the Fort Worth firm of Freese and Nichols; construction was supervised by the Army Corps of Engineers. Water and gas lines were laid by another Fort Worth company, Sherman and Erbett; while electricity was provided by the American District Telegraph Company of Texas. It took a work force of around 1,000 people to build the camp. Some laborers were locals and worked on the project when time from their other duties allowed them, but the majority of laborers were from out-of-town and resided on the camp in the barracks they had constructed. Food for the workers was provided by a local restaurant. The total cost of the project was $2 million.

The camp consisted of four compounds: three for enlisted men and one for officers, with additional quarters for U.S. military personnel. Each compound had enough barracks to house around 1,000 men. Upon completion, Camp Hereford was capable of housing 4,800 enlisted men, 1,000 officers, and the American soldiers needed to operate the facility. Although the buildings were not designed to be permanent structures, Camp Hereford was constructed as a maximum security facility and precautions were made to prevent escape. Each compound was fenced in, and the entire complex itself was surrounded by an electric fence; guards, armed with machine guns and rifles, were stationed in towers along the perimeter of the prison and given orders to fire on any prisoner caught between the two fences. Each guard tower was occupied by at least two men at all times, and was equipped with a loudspeaker and floodlights. The towers were connected to one another (and the captain of the guard) by telephone and were spaced in such a way as to give the guards clear sightlines and firing lines.

Camp Hereford was a base camp, meaning a large facility capable of holding anywhere from 3,000 to 6,000 prisoners, which provided workers for smaller branch camps located in and around the Texas Panhandle. Base camps were typically located in rural areas to make escape more difficult, and also so that prison labor could be more easily exploited by rural farmers and businesses (civilian labor being in short supply due to the war effort). Camp Hereford was one of only a handful of base camps constructed on private property in Texas specifically for the housing of prisoners-of-war, most of the other base camps in Texas were located on already existing military bases. It was the only base camp in Texas for Italian prisoners-of-war and also "the camp to which hard-core Fascists and troublemakers were sent". A group of German prisoners was briefly sent to Camp Hereford, but they were quickly removed when rioting broke out between them and the Italians who were already there.

=== Camp life ===
Upon arrival to the United States, Axis prisoners were to be showered and deloused at the port in which they arrived, but these procedures were not often followed. Instead, wearing the uniforms in which they had been captured, many were led onto trains and sent directly to their assigned prison camps. The first prisoners to arrive at Camp Hereford, in the spring of 1943, were Italian soldiers captured during the African Campaign. They disembarked from the train at Summerfield, Texas and were marched 8 miles (12.87 km) to the new camp, residents remember the soldiers sang "Rosamunde" as they marched. Once in camp, after being fed and allowed to shower, the prisoners experienced a restless few days in which they were assigned barracks, vaccinated, examined by a doctor, interviewed, and given a serial number. All prisoners were issued "underwear (four pair), socks (four pair), a belt, a cap, coat, gloves, [and] overcoat". If it was in good shape, enlisted men had their national uniform marked with the letters "PW"; if their uniform was in poor condition they were issued two pairs of pants and two shirts with the "PW" marking. The clothing of officer prisoners was not marked. Reveille occurred at 5:45 each morning and the prisoners were expected to be in bed by 10 o'clock each evening.

The Italian soldiers held at Camp Hereford could be broadly separated into two groups: "Mussolini's men" and "King's men". Mussolini's men were loyal fascists who had been fighting in North Africa since 1940. The King's men were politically more moderate and loyal to King Victor Emmanuel III. They were reinforcements sent to North Africa right as it was falling to the Allies, and many surrendered "never having fired a shot". The American garrison at the camp separated the prisoners based on rank and then, as best as could be determined, by political affiliation. This was done to maintain order in the camp, because violence could erupt between the diehard fascists and the moderates if the two groups were ever in the same area together. Mussolini's men were kept in compound one and the King's men were housed in compound two, while non-commissioned officers were in compound three. These three compounds were on an open barracks plan with forty men in each building. In compound four, where the officers were housed, the barracks were divided into apartments. "Lieutenants lived four to an apartment, captains two to an apartment, and ranks of major and above could claim sole occupancy of an apartment and a bath."

In September 1943 the Allied forces and the Kingdom of Italy signed the Armistice of Cassibile, and the government of Pietro Badoglio subsequently declared war on Germany in October. Badoglio also issued a proclamation directing all Italian prisoners of war to "actively collaborate" with the Allied forces. Along these lines, beginning in early 1944, the War Department began to form Italian Service Units made up of Italian POWs who pledged their loyalty to the Allies. In return for their loyalty, the men who joined these units were removed from the prison camps and sent to military bases around the country in need of labor. They were paid, partly in cash and partly in scrip, were given a standard issued G.I. uniform, and were allowed to use base facilities as well as travel to nearby towns and cities. Over 85% of the 51,000 Italian prisoners of war in the United States joined the Italian Service Units, and the ones who did not were often sent to Camp Hereford. Hereford's pro-fascist character was only reinforced as more moderate prisoners, eager and willing to work, left and were replaced by the most recalcitrant and uncooperative prisoners from other camps.

==== Work ====
All prisoners received a monthly allowance ranging from "$3 for an enlisted man to $20 for a lieutenant, $30 for a captain, and $40 for a major and any higher rank." According to the Geneva Conventions officer prisoners could not be forced to do work of any kind, while non-commissioned officers could be tasked with supervisory or administrative roles. Enlisted prisoners, however, could be required to work, and they made up the bulk of the camp's labor force. Prisoners performed routine tasks typical of the maintenance, cleaning, and operation of any military post including kitchen duty, garbage detail, basic repair work, and any number of other daily chores; this work was unpaid. Any work performed beyond this regular maintenance was to be paid according to the Geneva Conventions. Prisoners could volunteer to do paid work at a rate of $0.10 per hour, which was the going rate of pay for an American private. Although prisoners with special skills could perform paid tasks around the camp, the bulk of paid work was contract labor outside of camp for local farmers and businesses. To secure a contract for prison labor, farmers filled out a certificate of need from the War Manpower Commission and the prisoners were then allocated by the Extension Service of the Department of Agriculture on a county level. Prisoners from Camp Hereford performed all types of agricultural work in the surrounding community including processing carrots, picking cotton, and sacking potatoes and onions. They also poured concrete for the grain elevators at Pitman Grain. One crew, contracted for agricultural work, was loaned out to the Summerfield Baptist Church to help work on the church's basement and roof.

The prisoners were not allowed to have any real money in their possession so they received their monthly credits, and wages for any paid work, in scrip which could be redeemed at the canteen or post exchange. At the canteen prisoners could redeem their coupons for additional food and beverages such as candy and beer. Stationery, toiletries, additional clothing, playing cards, magazines, as well as cigarettes, tobacco and other smoking supplies could also be bought at the canteen. The canteen was operated by the prisoners themselves, and the profits that were made accumulated into a fund that could be used by the prisoners, at the discretion of the camp commander, to buy specialty items.

==== Food ====
There were identical dining halls in each compound. Each one had a kitchen with a large refrigerator which was separated from the dining area by a counter. To prevent food waste from serving prisoners unfamiliar foods, the prisoners (under the supervision of the camp mess officer) were allowed to prepare their meals according to their own tastes. Early on in the war, the United States closely followed Article 11 of the Geneva Conventions which stipulated that prisoners of war be given food "equal in quality and quantity to that supplied to American troops." Many Italian prisoners of war, having been undernourished while fighting in the war, gained weight after their first few months of internment in the United States. Apple butter, tomatoes, tomato sauce, and ketchup were among the preferred foods of the inmates at Hereford, rolled oats were also a favorite for breakfast, but the prisoners did not like corn. In July 1943, a reporter for the Amarillo Daily News detailed the three courses that were served that day: breakfast consisted of cereal, fruit, eggs, milk, bread, tea, and apple butter. For dinner beans, cabbage, beef with gravy and tomato sauce, beets, bread, tea, and more apple butter was served. And for supper, polenta, tomato sauce, cabbage, apple butter, and lemonade. Around the same time, a reporter for the Fort Worth Star-Telegram found the prisoners had "chicken cacciatore, peas, spaghetti with sauce, bread, cake and coffee" for their noon-day meal. Bacon, eggs, raisins, and bread had been served with coffee and milk for breakfast, and for supper they were to have baked beans, beets, and a salad. Their pantry was well stocked and their walk-in refrigerator contained a few dressed lambs, salami, and fresh vegetables.

In the spring of 1945, a general food shortage in the United States, coupled with reports of starvation among American POWs liberated from Axis prison camps, and a national campaign of newspaper editorials and commentaries accusing the government of "coddling" prisoners of war led the Provost Marshal General's office to severely reduce the rations prisoners housed in America were to receive. The new guidelines called for 2,500 daily calories for a non-working prisoner, and 3,400 daily calories for a working prisoner. How strictly these calorie limits were enforced was left up to the various camp commanders. At Camp Hereford, Colonel Joseph Carvolth strictly enforced these limits and even went beyond them. During this time, a report from the camp's head physician, Major Luigi Cabitto, stated that the 2,500 calorie limit was rarely achieved and that daily menus were routinely around 2,000 calories and sometimes as low as 1,500 calories. This period of deprivation, dubbed la fame by the prisoners, lasted from the spring of 1945 to the late fall. With their rations reduced and food items from the canteen strictly cut back the prisoners were forced to find supplemental calories anywhere they could. Enlisted men, who were generally fed better than the officers, would sometimes throw food over the fence to the officers' compound. Some prisoners killed and ate rattlesnakes they found, while others captured grasshoppers and fried them in Brilliantine. Fish heads and entrails were dug out of garbage cans and used to make broth, other prisoners experimented with broths of grass and bellflowers. Having a job outside of camp was a reliable way for the prisoners to obtain extra food. Enlisted men who worked in the potato fields of Hereford were often allowed to boil as many potatoes as they wanted, and were sometimes given bread and meat by the farmers for whom they worked. Army Sergeant John Coyle, who provided transportation for prison laborers, would shoot jackrabbits in local farmers' fields in between trips to and from the camp. At the end of their workday, Coyle would give the prisoners a few dressed rabbits which they smuggled into camp beneath their pants, tied tightly to their thighs.

Censors prevented letters written by the prisoners complaining of their mistreatment from reaching their intended targets. Reverend Achilles Ferreri, the camp priest, passed his concerns about the reduced rations along to the Bishop of Amarillo, Laurence Julius FitzSimon. After visiting the camp and dining with the prisoners himself, Bishop FitzSimon wrote a letter to representative Eugene Worley regarding the desperate state of the prisoners. As a result of this letter, and various prisoner complaints that escaped the notice of censors, a military investigation into the conditions at Camp Hereford was launched involving the Italian ambassador, the International Red Cross, the Diocese of Amarillo, and the Provost Marshal General's office. The complaints of the prisoners were largely substantiated by the investigation, and by November the canteen was reopened and rations were slightly increased. The average weight loss among prisoners during the period of la fame was 20 pounds (9.1 kg), while some men lost as much as 40 pounds (18 kg). Although no deaths were reported as a direct result of the conditions at Hereford, a corporal was stabbed to death by an enlisted man for not sharing the caramels he had with him.

==== Recreation and entertainment ====
Although not obligated by the Geneva Conventions, recreational equipment and entertainment was provided to the inmates at Camp Hereford under the assumption that happier prisoners were more easily controlled and incarcerated. The United States government provided soccer balls, basketballs, volleyballs and volleyball nets, ping-pong tables, croquet sets, and horseshoes, as well as a variety of board games and card games to all prisoner of war camps. Additional equipment and supplies were provided by non-governmental organizations such as the Red Cross and the YMCA, or purchased by the prisoners themselves with the profits from canteen sales. At Hereford, each compound had its own playing field, and the officers' compound had a tennis court that was built by the prisoners. Although attempts were made to teach the Italians American football, soccer and bocce proved to be more popular.

The prisoners at Camp Hereford published at least three newsletters covering camp news (Il Powieri), literature and politics (Argomenti), and sports (Olimpia). The prisoners had no way to reproduce the newsletters so they were passed around the camp from one person to the next.

== Notable prisoners ==
- Giuseppe Berto
- Vincenzo Buonassisi
- Alberto Burri
- Giovanni Dello Jacovo
- Dino Gambetti
- Augusto Marinoni
- Roberto Mieville
- Dante Troisi
- Gaetano Tumiati
- Giovanni Peyron

== See also ==
- List of World War II prisoner-of-war camps in the United States
- Italian Service Units

== Works cited ==
- Moore, John Hammond (Fall 1976). "Italian POWs in America: War Is Not Always Hell". Prologue. 8: 140–151. ISSN 0033-1031.
- Wegman, Michaela (December 2020). Community, the WWII Homefront, and POW art: the St. Mary's Project in Umbarger, Texas (PDF) (Thesis). West Texas A&M University.
- Henegar, Lucielle (1986). "Beating Swords into Ploughshares: Hereford Military Rservation and Reception Center". West Texas Historical Association Year Book. 62: 14–28. ISSN 0886-6155.
- Keefer, Louis E. (1992). Italian Prisoners of War in America 1942–1946. New York: Praeger. ISBN 027593845X.
- Rogers, Joe D. (1989). "Camp Hereford: Italian Prisoners of War on the Texas Plains, 1942-1945". Panhandle-Plains Historical Review. 62: 57–110. ISSN 0148-7795.
- Williams, Donald Mace (1992). Interlude in Umbarger. Lubbock, Texas: Texas Tech University Press. ISBN 0896722767.
- Hurt, R. Douglas (2008). The Great Plains during World War II. Lincoln & London: University of Nebraska Press. ISBN 9780803224094.
- Graves, Debe (1982). "POW Camp". Deaf Smith County, Texas, 1876-1981 : the land and its people. Deaf Smith County, Texas: Deaf Smith County Historical Society. pp. 60–61. OCLC 748292802.
- Walker, Richard Paul (May 1980). Prisoners of War in Texas During World War II (PDF) (PhD). North Texas State University.
