= Angelo Nicotra =

Italian voice actor (1948–2024)

- Born: 10 April 1948; Rome, Italy
- Died: 8 March 2024 (aged 75); Rome, Italy
- Occupations: Actor; voice actor; dubbing director
- Years active: 1952–2022
- Spouse(s): Olimpia Di Nardo (divorced); Fiorella Fiorini
- Children: 2
- Parents: Antonio Nicotra (father); Mariannina Libassi (mother)
- Relatives: Giancarlo Nicotra (brother)

Angelo Nicotra (10 April 1948 – 8 March 2024) was an Italian actor and voice actor.

== Biography ==
Born in Rome and the youngest son of the actors Antonio Nicotra and Mariannina Libassi, Nicotra began his career as a child actor with short roles in the 1952 film Genoese Dragnet and the 1953 film Good Folk's Sunday. He continued acting on screen as an adult portraying the protagonist's colleague in the 1982 film The Haunted House. Additionally, he made at least one appearance in the television shows Il maresciallo Rocca and Carabinieri.

Nicotra was best known as a voice actor, dubbing films, television shows and video games into the Italian language. He became the official Italian voice of Morgan Freeman after Renato Mori stepped down from the role in 2011. He also dubbed over the voices of Danny Glover, Forest Whitaker, Jeffrey Tambor, Brendan Gleeson, Paul Guilfoyle, John Goodman, Richard Jenkins and other actors in much of their content. Some of his character roles include Ben Parker (performed by Cliff Robertson) in the Spider-Man trilogy, Ratchet (performed by Robert Foxworth) in the Transformers film series and Reuben Tishkoff (performed by Elliott Gould) in the Ocean's film series.

In Nicotra's animated roles, he performed the voice of Mr. Potato Head in the Italian dubbed version of the Toy Story film franchise until the fourth movie, as well as the Italian voice of Gonzo in The Muppets from 1979 until 2021. He also dubbed Brain in Animaniacs and Pinky and the Brain as well as Dr. Zoidberg in the last 19 episodes of the seventh season of Futurama following the death of Claudio Fattoretto in 2013. Additionally, Nicotra replaced Massimo Corvo as the Italian voice of Pete from 2011 until 2021 when Paolo Marchese took on the role.

=== Personal life ===
Nicotra was the younger brother of the television director Giancarlo Nicotra. He had one daughter, Barbara from his marriage to the actress Olimpia Di Nardo. From his marriage to Fiorella Fiorini, he had one son, Francesco, who is also a voice actor.

== Death ==
Nicotra died in Rome on 8 March 2024, one month before his 76th birthday.

== Filmography ==
=== Cinema ===
| Year | Title | Role | Notes |
|---|---|---|---|
| 1952 | Genoese Dragnet | Carabinieri Marshal's son | |
| 1953 | Good Folk's Sunday | | |
| 1982 | The Haunted House | Work colleague | |
| 2011 | The Arrival of Wang | The General | |

=== Television ===
| Year | Title | Role | Notes |
|---|---|---|---|
| 1961 | Graziella | Beppo | TV miniseries |
| 1965 | Scaramouche | | TV miniseries |
| 1973 | Qui squadra mobile | Messenger | 1 episode (season 1, episode 1) |
| 1991 | Come una mamma | Mr. Giacometti | TV miniseries |
| 1993 | La scalata | Morgue doctor | TV miniseries |
| 1996 | Il maresciallo Rocca | Santini | 3 episodes (season 1) |
| 2004 | Carabinieri | Luciano Sapio | 1 episode (season 3, episode 15) |
| 2009 | Inspector Coliandro | Communications Company Director | 1 episode (season 2, episode 2) |

== Voice work ==
=== Dubbing ===
==== Films (Animation, Italian dub) ====
| Year | Title | Role(s) | Ref |
|---|---|---|---|
| 1978 | Watership Down | Hazel | |
| 1979 | The Muppet Movie | Gonzo | |
| 1981 | The Great Muppet Caper | Gonzo | |
| 1984 | Nausicaä of the Valley of the Wind | Lord Yupa | |
| 1992 | The Muppet Christmas Carol | Gonzo / Charles Dickens | |
| 1995 | Toy Story | Mr. Potato Head | |
| 1995 | The Tale of Tillie's Dragon | Assistant Mayor Wilner | |
| 1996 | Muppet Treasure Island | Gonzo | |
| 1998 | Spriggan | Mr. Yamamoto | |
| 1999 | South Park: Bigger, Longer & Uncut | Mr. Garrison | |
| 1999 | The Adventures of Elmo in Grouchland | Grover | |
| 1999 | Muppets from Space | Gonzo | |
| 1999 | Toy Story 2 | Mr. Potato Head | |
| 1999 | Stuart Little | Reginald Stout | |
| 2000 | Saint Seiya: The Heated Battle of the Gods | Dolvar (2000 redub) | |
| 2001 | Jimmy Neutron: Boy Genius | Hugh Neutron | |
| 2001 | Cowboy Bebop: The Movie | Vincent Volaju | |
| 2003 | Finding Nemo | Gill | |
| 2004 | Team America: World Police | Spottswoode | |
| 2004 | Boo, Zino & the Snurks | Bramph | |
| 2009 | Cloudy with a Chance of Meatballs | Tim Lockwood | |
| 2009 | Coraline | Sergei Alexander Bobinsky | |
| 2009 | Santa Buddies | Santa Paws | |
| 2010 | Legend of the Guardians: The Owls of Ga'Hoole | Ezylryb | |
| 2010 | Toy Story 3 | Mr. Potato Head | |
| 2011 | The Muppets | Gonzo | |
| 2011 | Hawaiian Vacation | Mr. Potato Head | |
| 2011 | Small Fry | Mr. Potato Head | |
| 2012 | Partysaurus Rex | Mr. Potato Head | |
| 2013 | Cloudy with a Chance of Meatballs 2 | Tim Lockwood | |
| 2013 | Dragon Ball Z: Battle of Gods | King Kai | |
| 2013 | Epic | Larry | |
| 2014 | Muppets Most Wanted | Gonzo | |
| 2015 | The Good Dinosaur | Bubbha | |
| 2016 | Finding Dory | Gill | |
| 2018 | Asterix: The Secret of the Magic Potion | Termotrix | |
| 2018 | Incredibles 2 | Gus Burns / Reflux | |
| 2018 | Isle of Dogs | Boss | |
| 2019 | Dora and the Lost City of Gold | Boots | |
| 2019 | Toy Story 4 | Mr. Potato Head | |

==== Films (Live action, Italian dub) ====
| Year | Title | Role(s) | Original actor | Ref |
|---|---|---|---|---|
| 1967 | Nel sole | Francesco Alessandroni | Enrico Montesano | |
| 1974 | Thunderbolt and Lightfoot | Lightfoot | Jeff Bridges | |
| 1976 | Hit Squad | Gargiulo | Massimo Vanni | |
| 1980 | The Blues Brothers | Reverend Cleophus James | James Brown | |
| 1982 | Tootsie | Jeff Slater | Bill Murray | |
| 1983 | Crime in Formula One | Gambling Room Friend | Nicola Pistoia | |
| 1983 | Octopussy | Vijay | Vijay Amritraj | |
| 1984 | Greystoke: The Legend of Tarzan, Lord of the Apes | Tarzan | Christopher Lambert | |
| 1984 | Once Upon a Time in America | Patrick "Patsy" Goldberg | James Hayden | |
| 1984 | Places in the Heart | Moze Hadner | Danny Glover | |
| 1984 | Falling in Love | Victor Rawlins | Victor Argo | |
| 1985 | Friday the 13th: A New Beginning | Sheriff Tucker | Marco St. John | |
| 1985 | Back to the Future | Marvin Berry | Harry Waters Jr. | |
| 1985 | The Return of the Living Dead | Suicide | Mark Venturini | |
| 1985 | Silverado | Mal | Danny Glover | |
| 1986 | The American Bride | Sacha | Harvey Keitel | |
| 1988 | Die Hard | Al Powell | Reginald VelJohnson | |
| 1988 | Bird | Charlie Parker | Forest Whitaker | |
| 1989 | Henry V | Corporal Nym | Geoffrey Hutchings | |
| 1989 | The Killer | Fung Sei | Chu Kong | |
| 1990 | Downtown | Sergeant Dennis Curren | Forest Whitaker | |
| 1990 | Jacob's Ladder | George | Ving Rhames | |
| 1991 | The Naked Gun 2½: The Smell of Fear | John Sununu | Peter Van Norden | |
| 1991 | Eye of the Storm | Father | Bruce Gray | |
| 1992 | The Power of One | Geel Piet | Morgan Freeman | |
| 1992 | Glengarry Glen Ross | George Aaronow | Alan Arkin | |
| 1992 | La Belle Histoire | Pierre Lhermitte | Patrick Chesnais | |
| 1992 | Alien 3 | David Postlethwaite | Pete Postlethwaite | |
| 1993 | Sister Act 2: Back in the Habit | Father Thomas | Brad Sullivan | |
| 1993 | Carlito's Way | Frankie Taglialucci | Adrian Pasdar | |
| 1994 | Angels in the Outfield | George Knox | Danny Glover | |
| 1994 | Dumb and Dumber | Joe Mentalino | Mike Starr | |
| 1995 | Seven | Mark Swarr | Richard Schiff | |
| 1995 | Operation Dumbo Drop | Captain Sam Cahill | Danny Glover | |
| 1995 | Casino | Frank Marino | Frank Vincent | |
| 1996 | Sleepers | Shakes' father | Bruno Kirby | |
| 1996 | Striptease | Malcolm J. Moldowsky | Paul Guilfoyle | |
| 1996 | Night Falls on Manhattan | McGovern | Paul Guilfoyle | |
| 1996 | Primal Fear | Tommy Goodman | Andre Braugher | |
| 1996 | The Juror | Eddie | James Gandolfini | |
| 1997 | Conspiracy Theory | Flip | Terry Alexander | |
| 1997 | Starship Troopers | Jean Rasczak | Michael Ironside | |
| 1997 | Air Force One | Lloyd Shepherd | Paul Guilfoyle | |
| 1997 | Turbulence | Stubbs | Brendan Gleeson | |
| 1997 | Picture Perfect | Mr. Mercer | Kevin Dunn | |
| 1997 | Gone Fishin' | Gus Green | Danny Glover | |
| 1997 | The Postman | Captain Idaho | James Russo | |
| 1997 | The Devil's Own | Edwin Diaz | Rubén Blades | |
| 1997 | In & Out | Frank Brackett | Wilford Brimley | |
| 1997 | U Turn | Darrell | Billy Bob Thornton | |
| 1998 | The Replacement Killers | Stan "Zeedo" Zedkov | Michael Rooker | |
| 1998 | Bride of Chucky | Chucky | Brad Dourif | |
| 1998 | The Legend of 1900 | Impresario | Norman Chancer | |
| 1998 | Meet Joe Black | Quince | Jeffrey Tambor | |
| 1998 | The Negotiator | Nate Roenick | Paul Guilfoyle | |
| 1998 | Primary Colors | Richard Jemmons | Billy Bob Thornton | |
| 1998 | Taxi | Gérard Gibert | Bernard Farcy | |
| 1999 | Runaway Bride | Walter Carpenter | Paul Dooley | |
| 1999 | Double Jeopardy | Jim Mangold | Dave Hager | |
| 1999 | Lake Placid | Sheriff Hank Keough | Brendan Gleeson | |
| 1999 | The Children of the Marshland | Garris | Jacques Gamblin | |
| 1999 | Happy, Texas | Bob Allen Maslow | M. C. Gainey | |
| 1999 | Message in a Bottle | Charlie Toschi | Robbie Coltrane | |
| 1999 | For Love of the Game | Frank Perry | J. K. Simmons | |
| 1999 | Random Hearts | Marvin | Bill Cobbs | |
| 1999 | Entrapment | Conrad Greene | Maury Chaykin | |
| 2000 | O Brother, Where Art Thou? | Homer Stokes | Wayne Duvall | |
| 2000 | Taxi 2 | Gérard Gibert | Bernard Farcy | |
| 2000 | 28 Days | Daniel | Reni Santoni | |
| 2001 | Black Hawk Down | Danny McKnight | Tom Sizemore | |
| 2001 | Moulin Rouge! | The Unconscious Argentinean | Jacek Koman | |
| 2001 | Lázaro de Tormes | Arcipreste | Karra Elejalde | |
| 2001 | Ocean's Eleven | Reuben Tishkoff | Elliott Gould | |
| 2001 | America's Sweethearts | Hal Weidmann | Christopher Walken | |
| 2001 | Evolution | Dr. Paulson | Wayne Duvall | |
| 2001 | Vanilla Sky | Benny's Owner | James Murtaugh | |
| 2002 | Gangs of New York | Walter "Monk" McGinn | Brendan Gleeson | |
| 2002 | Spider-Man | Ben Parker | Cliff Robertson | |
| 2002 | Stealing Harvard | Mr. Warner | Dennis Farina | |
| 2003 | The Texas Chainsaw Massacre | Charlie Hewitt Jr. / Sheriff Hoyt | R. Lee Ermey | |
| 2003 | Gothika | Dr. Douglas Grey | Charles S. Dutton | |
| 2003 | Taxi 3 | General Edmond Bertineau | Jean-Christophe Bouvet | |
| 2004 | A Very Long Engagement | Angel Bassignano | Dominique Bettenfeld | |
| 2004 | Hellboy | Tom Manning | Jeffrey Tambor | |
| 2004 | Ocean's Twelve | Reuben Tishkoff | Elliott Gould | |
| 2004 | Vivacious Lady | Peter Morgan Sr. (2004 redub) | Charles Coburn | |
| 2004 | Saw | David Tapp | Danny Glover | |
| 2004 | Spider-Man 2 | Ben Parker | Cliff Robertson | |
| 2004 | Crash | Gun Store Owner | Jack McGee | |
| 2004 | Betty Blue | Eddy (2004 redub) | Gérard Darmon | |
| 2004 | Secret Window | Ken Karsch | Charles S. Dutton | |
| 2005 | Bewitched | Jim Fields | David Alan Grier | |
| 2005 | Stripes | Sergeant Hulka (2005 redub) | Warren Oates | |
| 2005 | Saw II | Daniel Rigg | Lyriq Bent | |
| 2006 | The Texas Chainsaw Massacre: The Beginning | Charlie Hewitt Jr. / Sheriff Hoyt | R. Lee Ermey | |
| 2006 | It's a Boy Girl Thing | Stan Deane | Maury Chaykin | |
| 2006 | The Marsh | Geoffrey Hunt | Forest Whitaker | |
| 2006 | Saw III | Daniel Rigg | Lyriq Bent | |
| 2007 | The Visitor | Walter Vale | Richard Jenkins | |
| 2007 | Ocean's Thirteen | Reuben Tishkoff | Elliott Gould | |
| 2007 | Taxi 4 | General Edmond Bertineau | Jean-Christophe Bouvet | |
| 2007 | Saw IV | Daniel Rigg | Lyriq Bent | |
| 2007 | Spider-Man 3 | Ben Parker | Cliff Robertson | |
| 2007 | The Air I Breathe | Happiness | Forest Whitaker | |
| 2007 | Transformers | Ratchet | Robert Foxworth | |
| 2007 | Premonition | Sheriff Reilly | Marc Macaulay | |
| 2008 | Hellboy II: The Golden Army | Tom Manning | Jeffrey Tambor | |
| 2008 | City of Ember | Mayor Cole | Bill Murray | |
| 2008 | Marley & Me | Arnie Klein | Alan Arkin | |
| 2008 | Taken | Stuart St John | Xander Berkeley | |
| 2008 | Blindness | Man with the Black Eye Patch | Danny Glover | |
| 2008 | A Man and His Dog | Baptistin | Pierre Mondy | |
| 2008 | Martyrs | Mr. Belfond | Robert Toupin | |
| 2009 | Did You Hear About the Morgans? | Earl Granger | Wilford Brimley | |
| 2009 | Transformers: Revenge of the Fallen | Ratchet | Robert Foxworth | |
| 2009 | The Invention of Lying | Anthony James | Jeffrey Tambor | |
| 2009 | Sherlock Holmes | John Standish | William Hope | |
| 2010 | The Experiment | Michael Barris | Forest Whitaker | |
| 2010 | Sarah's Key | Jules Dufaure | Niels Arestrup | |
| 2010 | Trollhunter | Hans | Otto Jespersen | |
| 2010 | All Good Things | Mayor | David Margulies | |
| 2010 | Little White Lies | Jean-Louis | Joël Dupuch | |
| 2010 | Faster | Slade Humphries | Billy Bob Thornton | |
| 2010 | Legion | Percy Walker | Charles S. Dutton | |
| 2011 | Pirates of the Caribbean: On Stranger Tides | Blackbeard | Ian McShane | |
| 2011 | Transformers: Dark of the Moon | Ratchet | Robert Foxworth | |
| 2011 | Killer Elite | Colonel Fitz | Bille Brown | |
| 2011 | Hall Pass | Coakley | Richard Jenkins | |
| 2011 | Friends with Benefits | Mr. Harper | Richard Jenkins | |
| 2011 | The Rum Diary | Edward J. Lotterman | Richard Jenkins | |
| 2011 | J. Edgar | Norman Schwarzkopf Sr. | Dermot Mulroney | |
| 2011 | Jack and Jill | Al Pacino | Al Pacino | |
| 2011 | Paul | Adam Shadowchild | Jeffrey Tambor | |
| 2012 | Happiness Never Comes Alone | Alain Posche | François Berléand | |
| 2012 | The Dream Team | Titouan Leguennec | Jean-Pierre Marielle | |
| 2012 | Argo | John Chambers | John Goodman | |
| 2012 | Trouble with the Curve | Pete Klein | John Goodman | |
| 2012 | Asterix and Obelix: God Save Britannia | Abraracourcix | Michel Duchaussoy | |
| 2012 | Contraband | Captain Redmond Camp | J. K. Simmons | |
| 2012 | Safe House | David Barlow | Brendan Gleeson | |
| 2012 | Moonrise Kingdom | Narrator | Bob Balaban | |
| 2012 | A Dark Truth | Francisco Francis | Forest Whitaker | |
| 2012 | Crooked Arrows | Mr. Geyer | Tom Kemp | |
| 2013 | The Kingdom of Dreams and Madness | Toshio Suzuki | Toshio Suzuki | |
| 2013 | Now You See Me | Thaddeus Bradley | Morgan Freeman | |
| 2013 | Last Vegas | Archie Clayton | Morgan Freeman | |
| 2013 | Labor Day | Mr. Jervis | J. K. Simmons | |
| 2013 | Wolf Creek 2 | Mick Taylor | John Jarratt | |
| 2013 | The Hangover Part III | Marshall | John Goodman | |
| 2013 | The Internship | Sammy Boscoe | John Goodman | |
| 2013 | The Smurfs 2 | Victor Doyle | Brendan Gleeson | |
| 2013 | Homefront | Lewis | Stuart Greer | |
| 2014 | Guardians of the Galaxy | Yondu Udonta | Michael Rooker | |
| 2014 | Transformers: Age of Extinction | Ratchet | Robert Foxworth | |
| 2014 | A Fighting Man | Brother Albright | James Caan | |
| 2014 | Transcendence | Joseph Tagger | Morgan Freeman | |
| 2014 | Lucy | Professor Samuel Norman | Morgan Freeman | |
| 2014 | 5 Flights Up | Alex Carver | Morgan Freeman | |
| 2014 | Rage | Peter St. John | Danny Glover | |
| 2015 | The Perfect Guy | Roger Vaughn | Charles S. Dutton | |
| 2015 | Ted 2 | Patrick Meighan | Morgan Freeman | |
| 2015 | Last Knights | Bartok | Morgan Freeman | |
| 2015 | Momentum | Senator | Morgan Freeman | |
| 2015 | Spotlight | Peter Conley | Paul Guilfoyle | |
| 2016 | The Accountant | Ray King | J. K. Simmons | |
| 2016 | Now You See Me 2 | Thaddeus Bradley | Morgan Freeman | |
| 2016 | Ben-Hur | Sheik Ilderim | Morgan Freeman | |
| 2016 | Ghostbusters | Dr. Martin Heiss | Bill Murray | |
| 2016 | Moka | Private Investigator | Jean-Philippe Écoffey | |
| 2017 | Guardians of the Galaxy Vol. 2 | Yondu Udonta | Michael Rooker | |
| 2017 | Father Figures | Terry Bradshaw | Terry Bradshaw | |
| 2017 | Going in Style | Willie Davis | Morgan Freeman | |
| 2017 | Transformers: The Last Knight | Ratchet | Robert Foxworth | |
| 2017 | Kong: Skull Island | Bill Randa | John Goodman | |
| 2018 | The Old Man & the Gun | Teddy Green | Danny Glover | |
| 2018 | BlacKkKlansman | Jerome Turner | Harry Belafonte | |
| 2018 | Ocean's 8 | Reuben Tishkoff | Elliott Gould | |
| 2019 | Angel Has Fallen | President Allan Trumbull | Morgan Freeman | |
| 2019 | The Dead Don't Die | Hank Thompson | Danny Glover | |
| 2020 | The SpongeBob Movie: Sponge on the Run | El Diablo | Danny Trejo | |
| 2021 | Nobody | Eddie Williams | Michael Ironside | |
| 2021 | Don't Look Up | Stuart Themes | Paul Guilfoyle | |
| 2022 | Texas Chainsaw Massacre | Sheriff Hathaway | William Hope | |

==== Television (Animation, Italian dub) ====
| Year | Title | Role(s) | Notes | Ref |
|---|---|---|---|---|
| 1988 | Urusei Yatsura | Various characters | Recurring role | |
| 1991 | Tom & Jerry Kids | McWolf | Main cast (season 1) | |
| 1995–1998 | The Simpsons | Superintendent Chalmers | Recurring role (seasons 5–7) | |
| 1996 | The Sylvester & Tweety Mysteries | Yosemite Sam | 1 episode (season 1, episode 13) | |
| 1996–1998 | Animaniacs | Brain | Main cast | |
| 1997–1999 | Pinky and the Brain | Brain | Main cast (seasons 1–3) | |
| 1997–2001 | Men in Black: The Series | Frank the Pug | Main cast | |
| 1999 | 2 Stupid Dogs | Mr. Hollywood | Recurring role | |
| 2000–2001 | Trigun | Various characters | Recurring role | |
| 2000–2003 | South Park | Mr. Garrison | Recurring role (seasons 1–3) | |
| 2000–2014 | Futurama | Dr. John A. Zoidberg | Main cast (season 7) | |
| 2000–2014 | Futurama | Mr. Panucci | Recurring role (seasons 1–7) | |
| 2000–2014 | Futurama | Robot Santa | Recurring role (seasons 2–4, 6–7) | |
| 2000–2014 | Futurama | Richard Nixon's head | Recurring role (seasons 1–7) | |
| 2000–2014 | Futurama | Don Bot | Recurring role (seasons 5–6) | |
| 2000–2014 | Futurama | Various characters | Recurring role (seasons 1–7) | |
| 2002 | It's a Very Merry Muppet Christmas Movie | Gonzo | TV film | |
| 2002 | It's a Very Merry Muppet Christmas Movie | Sal Minella | TV film | |
| 2002 | Lupin the Third: Dragon of Doom | Chin Chin Chu (2002 redub) | TV film | |
| 2002–2003 | Stargate Infinity | Gus Bonner | Main cast | |
| 2004–2017 | Postman Pat | P.C. Arthur Selby | Recurring role (seasons 3–7) | |
| 2005 | The Muppets' Wizard of Oz | Gonzo / The Tin Thing | TV film | |
| 2005 | Free Willy | Rockland Stone / The Machine | Recurring role | |
| 2005–2008 | The Muppet Show | Gonzo | Main cast (2005–2007 redub) | |
| 2010–2016 | Family Guy | Herbert | 1 episode (season 14, episode 3) | |
| 2010–2016 | Family Guy | O. J. Simpson | 1 episode (season 7, episode 9) | |
| 2010–2016 | Family Guy | Rush Limbaugh | 1 episode (season 9, episode 2) | |
| 2010–2016 | Family Guy | Various characters | Recurring role | |
| 2011–2016 | Mickey Mouse Clubhouse | Pete | Recurring role (seasons 3–6) | |
| 2013 | Toy Story of Terror! | Mr. Potato Head | TV special | |
| 2013–2019 | Mickey Mouse | Pete | Main cast | |
| 2014 | Toy Story That Time Forgot | Mr. Potato Head | TV special | |
| 2015–2016 | The Muppets | Gonzo | Main cast | |
| 2017–2021 | Mickey Mouse Mixed-Up Adventures | Pete | Main cast | |
| 2018–2021 | Muppet Babies | Gonzo | Main cast (seasons 1–2) | |
| 2020 | Muppets Now | Gonzo | Main cast | |
| 2020 | Scooby-Doo and Guess Who? | Morgan Freeman | 1 episode (season 2, episode 13) | |
| 2020–2021 | The Wonderful World of Mickey Mouse | Pete | Recurring role (season 1) | |

==== Television (Live action, Italian dub) ====
| Year | Title | Role(s) | Notes | Original actor | Ref |
|---|---|---|---|---|---|
| 1983 | Bienvenida Esperanza | Jacinto Nuñez | Main cast | Carlos Olivier | |
| 1985 | Leonela | Pedro Luis | Main cast | Carlos Olivier | |
| 1985 | Marta y Javier | Javier | Main cast | Carlos Olivier | |
| 2001–2015 | CSI: Crime Scene Investigation | Jim Brass | Main cast (seasons 1–14) | Paul Guilfoyle | |
| 2005 | Malcolm in the Middle | Otto Mannkusser | Recurring role (seasons 4–5) | Kenneth Mars | |
| 2006 | Stephen King's Desperation | Collie Entragian | TV film | Ron Perlman | |
| 2008–2014 | Merlin | Gaius | Main cast | Richard Wilson | |
| 2014 | The Bible | Ira | TV miniseries | Ken Bones | |
| 2015 | A Novel Romance | Harris | TV film | Charles S. Dutton | |
| 2016 | Medici | Ugo Bencini | Main cast (season 1) | Ken Bones | |
| 2016–2019 | Elementary | Morland Holmes | Recurring role (seasons 4–7) | John Noble | |

==== Video games (Italian dub) ====
| Year | Title | Role(s) | Ref |
|---|---|---|---|
| 2003 | Finding Nemo | Gill | |
| 2011 | Kinect: Disneyland Adventures | Ghost Host | |
| 2012 | Epic Mickey 2: The Power of Two | Pete | |
