= Marcovaldo =

Short story collection

Cover of the first edition, published by Giulio Einaudi.

Marcovaldo is a collection of 20 short stories written by Italo Calvino. It was initially published, in 1963, as Marcovaldo ovvero Le stagioni in città (Marcovaldo, or The Seasons in the City). The first stories were written in the early 1950s.

== Description ==
The book is made up of a collection of twenty stories, of which the first takes place in the spring, the second in summer, the third in the autumn and the fourth in the winter and so on, so that together they represent the yearly seasonal cycle five times. An Author's note explains that: "The first in the series were written in the early 1950s and thus are set in a very poor Italy. The last stories date from the mid-60s, when the illusion of an economic boom flourished".

In September 1983, an English translation of the book by William Weaver was published by Secker & Warburg.

== Plot summary ==
The Marcovaldo series depicts the life of a poor rural man with his family living in a big industrial city in northern Italy. The central character of Marcovaldo is an unskilled labourer for the company Sbav and Co. who has an affinity with nature and a distaste for city life. He is married to Domitilla and they have a growing family, which includes their daughters Isolina and Teresa, and their sons Michelino, Pietruccio, Filippetto and Paolino. Other characters include Marcovaldo's foreman, Signor Viligelmo, the street-cleaner Amadigi, and the night watchman Tornaquinci. In each story Marcovaldo succumbs to something that appears natural and beautiful but actually disappoints him. Common themes in the stories include pollution, appearance vs. reality, failure, poverty and consumerism.

The stories in the book are:

- Mushrooms in the city – Marcovaldo spots some mushrooms growing at his tram stop and jealously guards them until it rains and he can harvest them for a much-anticipated supper.
- Park-bench vacation – Marcovaldo spends a hot summer night sleeping on a park-bench, but it is not the peaceful experience he had longed for.
- The municipal pigeon – Seeing a rare flight of autumn woodcock flying over the city, Marcovaldo schemes to lure and catch them on the roof of his building.
- The city lost in the snow – Marcovaldo’s daydreams in the snow end abruptly.
- The wasp treatment – Marcovaldo enlists the help of his children in catching wasps, which he uses to cure the rheumatism of his neighbours.
- A Saturday of sun, sand, and sleep – The children bury their father in the warm sand on a river barge as a treatment for his rheumatism.
- The lunch-box – Marcovaldo and a rich young boy exchange their lunches.
- The forest on the superhighway – The children help their father find firewood in an unusual forest.
- The good air – Marcovaldo takes his children to the hills on the outskirts of the city for some fresh air.
- A journey with the cows – Marcovaldo is envious of his son, Michelino, when the boy spends the summer in the mountains after following a herd of cows crossing the city at night on their way to their alpine pastures.
- The poisonous rabbit – After spending time in a hospital convalescing, Marcovaldo inadvertently takes a rabbit home and then plans to fatten it up for Christmas.
- The wrong stop – Marcovaldo gets lost in thick fog after a night at the cinema.
- Where the river is more blue? – After a series of health scares in the city involving contaminated food, Marcovaldo attempts to feed his family fresh fish.
- Moon and Gnac – Marcovaldo’s efforts to teach his children about the night sky are thwarted by the neon sign on the roof of the building opposite his own.
- The rain and the leaves – Marcovaldo tries to nurse a potted plant to health.
- Marcovaldo at the supermarket – Marcovaldo’s family get carried away when they dream of emulating the wealthy consumers they see around them.
- Smoke, wind, and soap-bubbles – The children start collecting coupons for free washing powder.
- The city all to himself – Unable to afford a holiday, Marcovaldo wanders the deserted streets of the city.
- The garden of stubborn cats – Following a cat during his lunchbreak, Marcovaldo discovers the secret refuge of the city’s cats.
- Santa’s Children – The company he works for chooses Marcovaldo to dress as Santa and deliver Christmas presents to its important clients; his children unwittingly start a new trend in gifts.

== Critical reception ==
Writing in The New York Times in 1984, Franco Ferrucci noted of Calvino that: "Even early in his career, his rhetorical virtuosity disguised the subtlety and depth of his vision - especially in some of the stories in Marcovaldo, like The City Lost in the Snow, A Saturday of Sun, Sand and Sleep and The Wrong Stop. He writes lightly and jauntily; any trace of effort is concealed. But what catches the reader goes beyond the unspotted perfection of the style; it is his uninhibited poetic sense of life." Ferrucci added that, "What is so much admired by the readers of Mr. Calvino's later Invisible Cities was already at work in Marcovaldo and with a more cogent narrative drive. Invisible Cities seems like a memory, while Marcovaldo conveys the sensuous, tangible qualities of life".

== Adaptations ==
In 1970, Italian state TV company RAI broadcast a six-episode mini-series based on Marcovaldo with Nanni Loy in the title role and Didi Perego playing his wife, Domitilla.

In April 2021, BBC Radio 4 broadcast a series of five episodes based primarily on the William Weaver translation.
