= How to Travel with a Salmon & Other Essays =

Book by Umberto Eco

How To Travel With A Salmon: and Other Essays is a collection of essays by Umberto Eco translated into English by William Weaver. It was written over a period of thirty years and was published in October 1994 by Harcourt.

Eco called the essays Il diario minimo, after the magazine column where he first published a similar series, previously collected in Misreadings.
