= Antonio in Love =

1966 by Giuseppe Berto

- Original Italian language edition La cosa buffa (1966)
- Author: Giuseppe Berto
- Original title: La cosa buffa
- Translator: William Weaver
- Language: Italian
- Publisher: Rizzoli
- Publication date: 1966
- Publication place: Italy
- English publication date: 1968
- Pages: 350

Antonio in Love (Italian: La cosa buffa, lit. 'The Funny Thing') is a 1966 novel by the Italian writer Giuseppe Berto. It is about a young man in Venice who decides to fall in love, but becomes troubled when the woman he selects responds positively and eagerly to his advances. The book uses long sentences and has been described as an ironic variation of The Sorrows of Young Werther by Johann Wolfgang von Goethe. It was published in English translation in 1968.

The book is the basis for the 1972 film La cosa buffa directed by Aldo Lado and starring Gianni Morandi. The film is a loose adaptation.
