= La cosa buffa =

1972 Italian film by Aldo Lado

- Directed by: Aldo Lado
- Written by: Aldo Lado
- Based on: Antonio in Love by Giuseppe Berto
- Starring: Ottavia Piccolo; Gianni Morandi; Angela Goodwin; Fabio Garriba; Riccardo Billi; Dominique Darel; Giusi Raspani Dandolo
- Music by: Ennio Morricone
- Release date: 1972
- Country: Italy

La cosa buffa (lit. 'The Funny Thing') is a 1972 Italian comedy-drama film directed by Aldo Lado. It is an adaptation of a 1966 Italian novel of the same name by Giuseppe Berto.

== Plot ==
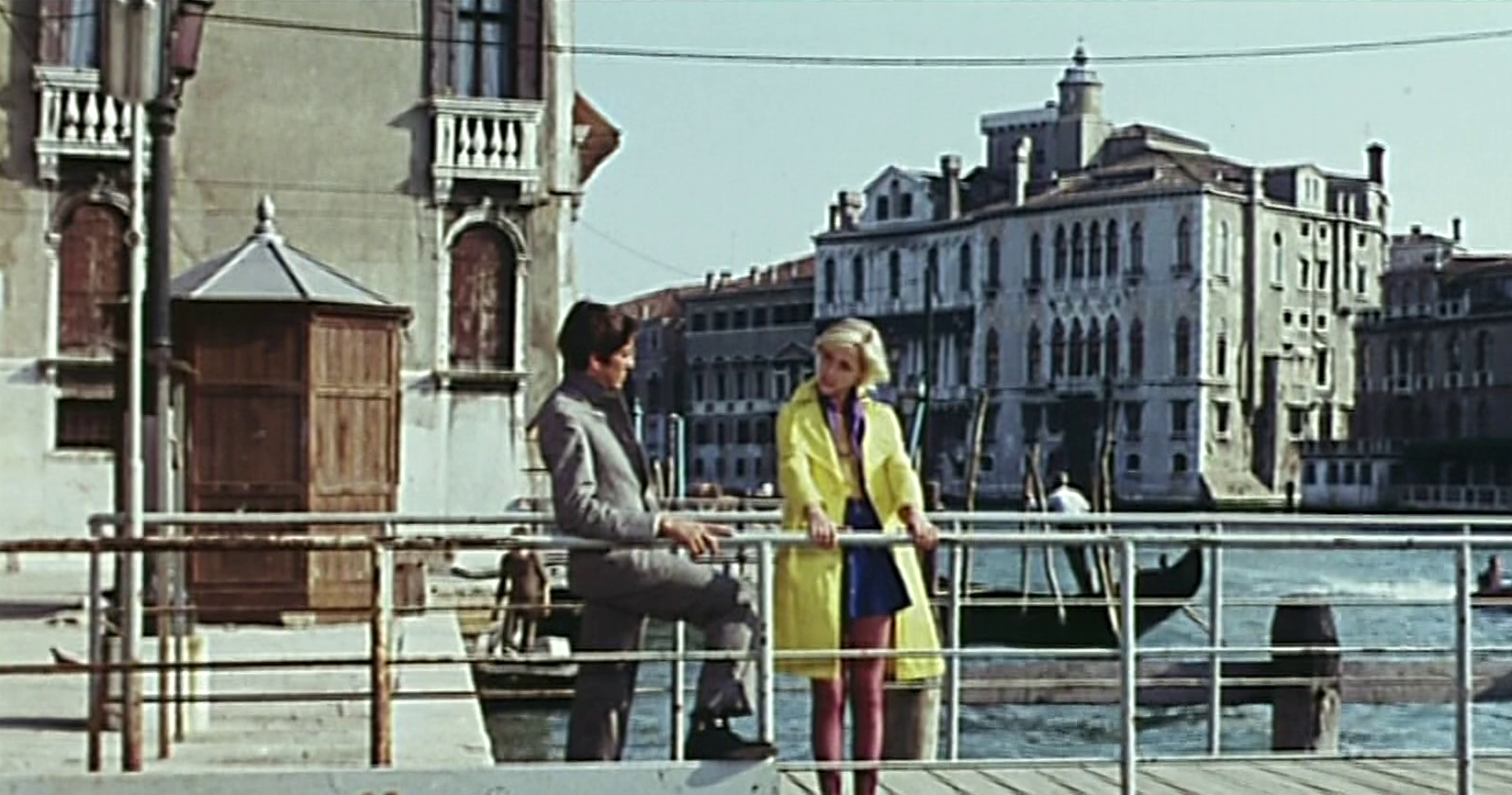
Still from the film

A young elementary school teacher falls in love with a Venetian woman who is the daughter of a wealthy industrialist.

== Production ==
The film is set and was shot in Venice. The music by Ennio Morricone contains parts sung by Edda Dell'Orso.
