= Claudio Fattoretto =

Italian voice actor

- Born: 12 May 1956; Rome, Italy
- Died: 30 June 2013 (aged 57); Rome, Italy
- Occupation: Voice actor
- Years active: 1980–2013

Claudio Fattoretto (12 May 1956 – 30 June 2013) was an Italian voice actor.

== Biography ==
Born in Rome, Fattoretto was known for dubbing voices, such as Dr. Zoidberg in the Italian-Language version of Futurama as well as Lieutenant Commander Worf in the Italian-Language version of Star Trek: The Next Generation and Sideswipe in the Italian-Language version of the Transformers live-action franchise.

Fattoretto was also known for dubbing Ving Rhames and Terry Crews in a few of their films. He also dubbed Dolph Lundgren, Samuel L. Jackson, Danny Trejo, Ron Perlman, Luis Guzmán and Michael Madsen in a select number of their movies.

== Death ==
Fattoretto died in Rome of a heart attack on 30 June 2013, aged 57. After his death, Angelo Nicotra took over as the voice of Zoidberg in the remaining 19 episodes of Futurama.

== Filmography ==
- Le finte bionde (1989) - "Ordinary people" (husband)
- La rossa del Roxy Bar - TV miniseries (1995) - Claudio

== Dubbing roles ==
=== Animation ===
- Dr. John A. Zoidberg (seasons 1-6, episode 7x06), Richard Nixon's head (season 1) and Mr. Panucci (season 1) in Futurama, Dr. John A. Zoidberg in Futurama: Bender's Big Score, Futurama: The Beast With a Billion Backs, Futurama: Bender's Game, Futurama: Into the Wild Green Yonder
- Scarface in The Animals of Farthing Wood
- Worf / Michael Dorn in Family Guy
- Vincent in Over the Hedge
- Commander Vachir in Kung Fu Panda
- Knuckles in The Swan Princess: Escape from Castle Mountain
- Roberto in Open Season 2, Open Season 3
- Luca in Garfield: The Movie
- Bobo the Bear in The Muppets
- Heihachi Mishima in Tekken: The Motion Picture

=== Live action ===
- Worf in Star Trek: The Next Generation, Star Trek Generations, Star Trek: First Contact, Star Trek: Insurrection, Star Trek: Nemesis
- Sideswipe in Transformers: Revenge of the Fallen, Transformers: Dark of the Moon
- Aaron Thibadeaux in Entrapment
- Kenneth Hall in Dawn of the Dead
- Fred G. Duncan in I Now Pronounce You Chuck & Larry
- Hellboy in Hellboy, Hellboy II: The Golden Army
- Isador "Machete" Cortez in Machete
- Shaq in Scary Movie 4
- Bill Broussard in JFK
- Jad in Minority Report
- Teal'c in Stargate SG-1

=== Video games ===
- Dr. John A. Zoidberg in Futurama
