= Eros e Priapo =

Eros e Priapo: da furore a cenere is a satiric pamphlet by the Italian author Carlo Emilio Gadda, written in 1945 and first published in a censored version in 1967.

== Uncensored edition ==
An excerpt comparison. The 1967 censored version is shown on the left, the 1945 original uncensored version on the right.

1967 censored version		1945 original uncensored version
pp.26-7		manuscript page
	Questo qui, Madonna bona!, non avea manco finito di imparucchiare quattro sue scolastiche certezze, che son qua mè, a fò tutt mè a fò tutt mè.		?
−	Venuto dalla più sciapita semplicità, parolaio da raduno communitosi del piu misero bagaglio di frasi fatte, tolse ecco a discendere secondo fiume dietro al numero: a sbraitare, a minacciare i fochi ne' pagliai, a concitare ed esagitare le genti: e pervenne infine, dopo le sovvenzioni del capitale e dopo una carriera da spergiuro, a depositare in catedra il suo deretano di Pirgopolinice smargiasso, addoppiato di pallore giacomo-giacomo, cioe sulla cadrega di Presidente del Conziglio. [...]	+	Venuto a panca in piazza a Forlimpopolo, dalla piu sciapita cafonaggine maccherone furioso, parolaio e istrione da popolo communitosi del più misero bagaglio di frasi fatte, datosi a paravolar di cazzo e a burattinare come un cazzo davantile genti, tolse ecco a discendere secondo fiume dietro il numero: a sbraitare, a minacciare i fochi ne' pagliai, a concitare ed esagitare le genti: e pervenne infine, dopo 'l facile introito giornalistico e dopo una carriera da Giuda, a depositare in catedra il suo deretano di Paflagone smargiasso, addoppiato di Scacazzone giacomo-giacomo, cioe sulla cadrega di Presidente del Conziglio [...]

== Style and sources ==
The work framework is an archaic-style prose drawn from the Florentine dialect of Machiavelli, interpolated with the modern vernacular of the Tuscan language, and in a few cases, of modern Lombard language and Romanesco dialect. Gadda said that this parallels what Machiavelli himself did with Tacitus, whose structure he interpolated with jargon from his time. Another source of archaic Florentine expressions is Benvenuto Cellini.

For the satiric attack, the main influences are the Book of Revelation, for its caricatures against Cesar and Rome, and D'Annunzio's Maia - Laus vitae.

== Related works ==
Some of Gadda's fables present related scatological elements. They are the 111th, 129th, 132nd, 134th, 137th, 138th, 147th and 184th fables of the antifascist cycle.

== See also ==
- Grotesque
