= The Experience of Pain =

1963 novel by Carlo Emilio Gadda

- First edition (Italian)
- Author: Carlo Emilio Gadda
- Original title: La cognizione del dolore
- Translator: Richard Dixon
- Language: Italian
- Genre: Literary
- Publisher: Einaudi
- Publication date: 1963
- Publication place: Italy
- English publication date: 1969
- Media type: Print (Paperback)
- Pages: 242 pp. (paperback edition)
- ISBN: 978-0-141-39539-5

The Experience of Pain (Italian: La cognizione del dolore) is a 1963 Italian novel by Carlo Emilio Gadda. First translated into English in 1969 by William Weaver as Acquainted with Grief, it was republished in 2017 by Penguin Books as The Experience of Pain, translated by Richard Dixon.

It has been described as one of the great works of twentieth century literature, comparable with James Joyce, and in line with the tradition of Rabelais, Sterne and Diderot.

== Setting ==
The novel is set in 1934 in the fictitious South American state of Maradagàl but is a thinly disguised portrait of Fascist Italy, and the landscapes are those of the Brianza area, north-west of Milan. The village of Lukones is modelled on Longone al Segrino where the Gadda family owned a villa; likewise Pastrufazio is Milan, Novokomi is Como, and Terepàttola is Lecco.

== Main characters ==
The main characters are Don Gonzalo Pirobutirro d’Eltino and his mother, often described simply as “the son” and “the mother”. They live in a villa outside the town of Lukones which Gonzalo's father had had built while he and his brother were children. His father is now dead, his brother was killed in a war with the neighbouring state of Parapagàl, and he and his mother live alone in the villa, though he spends much time away in the city of Pastrufazio, where he works.

Around the mother and the son we meet the local doctor, the night patrolman, the fish seller, the peon, the carpenter, the sacristan's wife, and the owner of the neighbouring castle, who provide the comic element of the novel, in contrast to the tension inside the villa.

== Plot summary ==
The South American state of Maradagàl is recovering from a bitter and inconclusive war with neighbouring Parapagàl. Many ex-soldiers have found work as patrolmen in provincial associations for night vigilance (Nistitúos Provinciales de Vigilancia para la Noche).

The village of Lukones is patrolled by a man known as Pedro Mahagones but an itinerant cloth trader recognizes him as Gaetano Palumbo who had fraudulently claimed a war pension on the grounds of being totally deaf.

The patrolman's round includes three villas that have been struck three times by lightning. One villa had been occupied by the famous poet Carlos Caconcellos and is now said to be haunted by his ghost, but its owner has managed to rent the caretaker's lodge to Colonel Di Pasquale, a military doctor who had been responsible for unmasking Palumbo's false pension claim.

Doctor Higueroa, the local doctor, receives a call from José, the peon at Villa Pirobutirro, asking him to go and visit Don Gonzalo. On his way up to the villa the doctor meets Battistina who helps out at the villa. He asks what is wrong. Battistina tells him that Señor Gonzalo wanders the house like a madman and his mother is frightened of being alone with him.

The doctor arrives at the villa and is greeted by Don Gonzalo. His mother has gone to visit the cemetery. The doctor examines him. He can find nothing wrong but notes his patient's anxiety and advises him to get out more often. He proposes a short excursion by motor car. Perhaps his daughter Pina could teach him to drive.

Returning outside, the son worries about his mother, who has grown old, and about his own despair which sometimes develops into violence. He worries that she sleeps in the house alone. The doctor suggests they might feel safer by joining the Nistitúo. They are interrupted by the patrolman who has come to see the Señora about signing up, but Don Gonzalo becomes impatient and sends him away.

The Señora wanders alone in the house, recalling her other son who had died in the war. A storm outside forces a blast of wind through a small window. On the staircase, in the gloom, she lights a candle and sees the black outline of a scorpion. The storm passes. The Señora remains there until she hears the cats waiting to be fed and the peon's clogs upstairs on the brick floor.

Gonzalo appears at the door. He barely greets his mother and goes to his room. She prepares some supper for him.

The son is sitting in the dining room before a bowl of soup. His mother tries to encourage him to eat. The peon comes in to light the fire but his noise and his complaints irritate the son, who orders him out of the house, telling him not to come back. The Señora pleads but Gonzalo repeats the injunction with sudden violence. He returns to his soup.

Gonzalo drinks his coffee on the terrace, then appears at the kitchen. Inside are two clogged figures, Peppa and José. There is news of a theft at the nearby castle. Its owner, Caballero Trabatta, had refused to sign up with the Nistitúo de Vigilancia despite repeated visits from its most loquacious and brilliantined propagandists.

Peppa comes to visit the Señora, then Poronga the carpenter with a basket of mushrooms and a filthy dog, followed by Beppina the fishwife, carrying an enormous yellow tench dangling from a metal hook. Then Pina del Goeupp, the wife of the dwarf sacristan at the parish church. Since it is Friday, there is also the peon's 83-year-old mother. The son arrives without warning to find them in the dining room. His mother offers him coffee, but he scowls and threatens hers. He packs his suitcase and leaves.

At the nearby castle, at night, two watchmen hear noises outside. They follow the sounds but find nothing. They hear a door bang inside Villa Pirobutirro. On investigation, they find the French window forced open and the house in disarray. They run down to Lukones to raise the alarm.

The villagers arrive, search the house and knock at the Señora's bedroom. They push open the door and find the Señora in bed, injured and barely breathing.

== An unfinished novel ==
Gadda's novel was never properly finished and remains an example of Gadda's "open workshop where nothing was ever quite put down or properly wrapped up". Italo Calvino described The Experience of Pain and That Awful Mess in Via Merulana as novels that "seem to need only a few more pages to reach their conclusions".

== Background ==
The villa in the novel is an exact description of the villa that Gadda's father had built in the village of Longone al Segrino around 1900, where he intended to bring up his children. But Gadda hated the place. His father had overstretched himself financially and when he died in 1909 Gadda urged his mother to sell the place, but she refused.

His mother, Adele Lehr, was of German parentage, a severe character, and the relationship between mother and son was not an easy one. In his diary Gadda wrote: “With mother I was nasty and think I always will be, since we have too many differences on everything”.

Gadda's brother Enrico died during World War I in a plane crash, a loss from which neither Gadda nor his mother recovered.

Despite his conflict with his mother, he found it hard to live without her: “The picture comes back to me of her, old and helpless, and above all the indescribable feelings I have of remorse at my outbursts, so pointless and vile. I suffered too much and was not in control of myself, but my anguish nevertheless is now very great."

He sold the villa soon after his mother's death: “This year I’ve managed to sell off my tottering estate at Longone, Brianza, making an appalling deal, but freeing myself of the feudal obsession”

== Publication history ==
He began work on this novel shortly after his mother's death on 4 April 1936. The first seven chapters appeared in instalments between 1938 and 1941 in Letteratura, a Florentine literary journal. These chapters were published together for the first time by Garzanti in 1963, but without the two final chapters, which had been written around the same time as the first seven chapters. The novel appeared in what would be its definitive form in 1970.
