= Giancarlo Nicotra =

Italian television writer, director and actor (1944–2013)

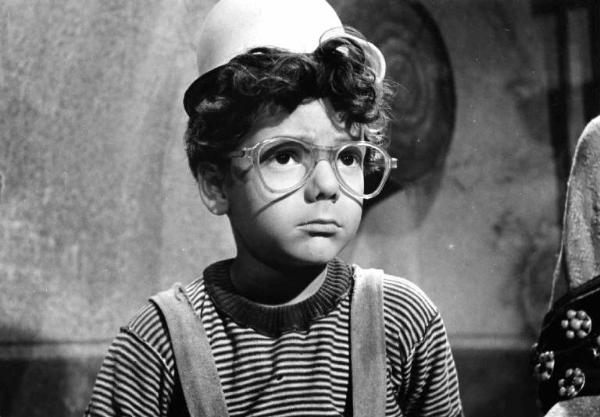
- Nicotra in The Angels of the District (1952)
- Born: 30 April 1944; Rome, Italy
- Died: 12 June 2013 (aged 69); Formello, Italy
- Occupations: Television writer; director; actor
- Parents: Antonio Nicotra (father); Mariannina Libassi (mother)
- Relatives: Angelo Nicotra (brother)

Giancarlo Nicotra (30 April 1944 – 12 June 2013), sometimes spelled Gian Carlo Nicotra, was an Italian television writer, director and actor.

== Biography ==
Born in Rome, Nicotra was the son of the actors Mariannina Libassi and Antonio Nicotra. He started his career as a child actor in 1950, and his acting career included several leading roles. In 1968 he debuted as television director, collaborating with the musical show Canzonissima. He was the author and director of the sitcom Nonno Felice and of a number of popular variety shows, including Senza rete, La Sberla, Drive In, Grand Hotel, Portobello and Domenica in.

== Selected filmography ==
- Il nido di Falasco (1950)
- Tragic Serenade (1951)
- The Angels of the District (1952)
- Man, Beast and Virtue (1953)
