= Il commissario De Vincenzi =

- Country of origin: Italy
- Original language: Italian
- No. of seasons: 2
- No. of episodes: 6

Original release
- Network: RAI
- Release: March 24, 1974 – 1977

Il commissario De Vincenzi (Inspector De Vincenzi) is an Italian television crime series, starring Paolo Stoppa in the title role.
