= Culture of Italian Americans =

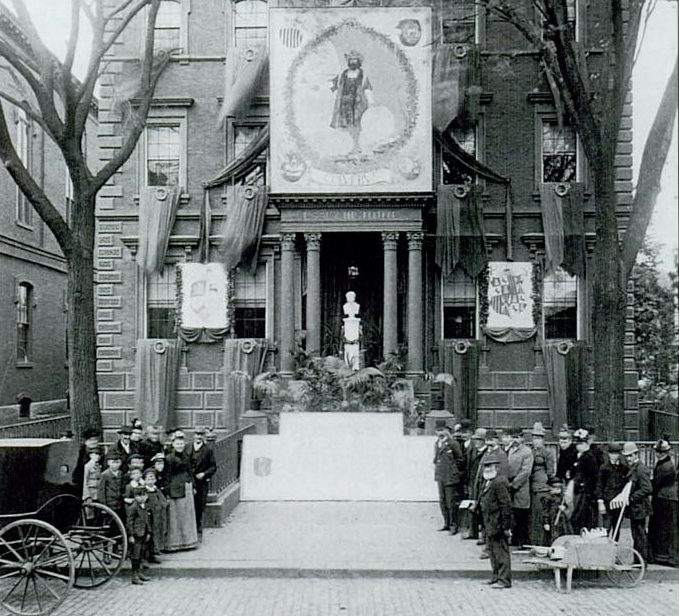
Columbus Day in Salem, Massachusetts in 1892

Italian Americans have influenced the American culture and society in a variety of ways, such as foods, coffees, and desserts; wine production (in California and elsewhere in the United States); popular music, starting in the 1940s and 1950s and continuing into the present; operatic, classical, and instrumental music; jazz; fashion and design; cinema, literature, and Italianate architecture, in homes, churches, and public buildings; Montessori schools; Christmas crèches; fireworks displays; and sports (e.g., bocce and beach tennis).

== Cinema ==
After World War II, numerous Italian Americans became well known in movies, both as actors and directors, and many were Academy Award recipients. Movie directors included Frank Capra, Francis Ford Coppola, Michael Cimino, Vincente Minnelli, Martin Scorsese, and Brian De Palma.

== Literature ==
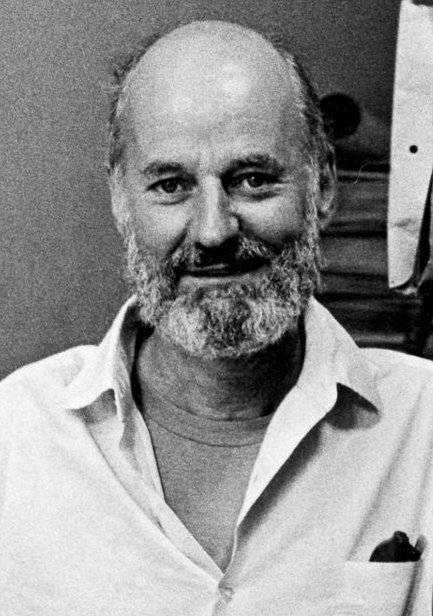
Lawrence Ferlinghetti

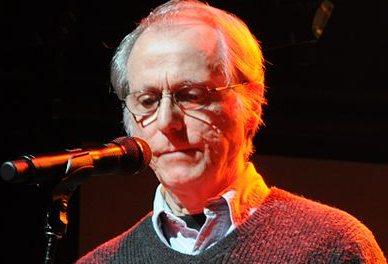
Don DeLillo

The works of a number of Italian American authors and poets, born of immigrant parents, were published in the first half of the 20th century. Pietro Di Donato, born in 1911, was a writer best known for his novel, Christ in Concrete, which was hailed by critics in the United States and abroad as a metaphor for the immigrant experience in America. Frances Winwar, born Francesca Vinciguerra in 1907 in Sicily, came to the United States at age 10. She is best known for her series of biographies of 19th-century English writers. She was also a frequent translator of classic Italian works into English and published several romantic novels set during historical events. John Ciardi, born in 1916, was primarily a poet. Among his works is a highly respected English-language rendition of Dante Alighieri's Divine Comedy. John Fante, born in 1909, was a novelist, short story writer, and screenwriter.

Later in the century, a growing number of books by recognized Italian American authors, such as Don DeLillo, Paul Gallico (Poseidon Adventure), Gilbert Sorrentino, Gay Talese, Camille Paglia, and Mario Puzo (The Fortunate Pilgrim) found a place in mainstream American literature. Other notable 20th-century authors included Dana Gioia, executive director of the National Endowment for the Arts; John Fusco, author of Paradise Salvage; Tina DeRosa; and Daniela Gioseffi, winner of the John Ciardi Award for Lifetime Achievement in Poetry, and The American Book Award; and Josephine Gattuso Hendin (The Right Thing to Do). Poets Sandra (Mortola) Gilbert and Kim Addonizio were also winners of the John Ciardi Award for Lifetime Achievement in Poetry from Italian Americana, as was writer Helen Barolini and poet Maria Mazziotti Gillan. These women have authored many books depicting Italian American women in a new light. Helen Barolini's The Dream Book: An Anthology of Writings by Italian American Women (1985) was the first anthology that pulled together the historic range of writing from the late 19th century to the 1980s. It exhibited the wealth of fiction, poetry, essays, and letters and paid special attention to the interaction of Italian American women with American social activism. Italian American poets Lawrence Ferlinghetti and Gregory Corso played a prominent role in the Beat Generation. Ferlinghetti was also the co-founder of City Lights Bookstore, a San Francisco bookstore and publishing company that published much of the work of other Beat Generation writers. Many of these authors' books and writings are easily found on the internet, as, for example, on an archive of contemporary Italian American authors, as well as in bibliographies online at Stonybrook University's Italian American Studies Department in New York or at the Italian American Writers Association website.

Among the scholars who have led the renaissance in Italian American literature are professors Richard Gambino, Anthony Julian Tamburri, Paolo Giordano, and Fred Gardaphé. The latter three founded Bordighera Press and edited From the Margin: An Anthology of Italian American Writing (Purdue University Press). At Brooklyn College, Dr. Robert Viscusi founded the Italian American Writers Association and is an author and American Book Award winner himself. A supplemental website at www.italianamericana.com to the journal Italian Americana, edited by novelist Christine Palamidessi Moore, also offers historical articles, stories, memoirs, poetry, and book reviews. Dana Gioia, was poetry editor of Italian Americana from 1993 to 2003, followed by poet Michael Palma, who also selects poems for Italian Americana's webpage supplement. Lawrence Ferlinghetti, Daniela Gioseffi, and Paul Mariani, are among the internationally known authors who have been awarded the John Ciardi Award for Lifetime Achievement in Poetry during Michael Palma's tenure as poetry editor. Daniela Gioseffi, with Alfredo de Palchi, founded the Annual $2,000 Bordighera Poetry Prize to further the names of Italian American poets in American literature. As of 1997, 12 books have been published in the bilingual series from Bordighera Press.

Italian Americans have written not only about the Italian American experience but also about the human experience. Some of the most popular inspirational books have been authored by Italian Americans—notably, those of Og Mandino, Leo Buscaglia, and Antoinette Bosco.

== Language ==
Italian speakers in the U.S.
Year	Speakers
1910^{a}	1,365,110
1920^{a}	1,624,998
1930^{a}	1,808,289
1940^{a}	1,561,100
1960^{a}	1,277,585
1970^{a}	1,025,994
1980	1,618,344
1990	1,308,648
2000	1,008,370
2011	723,632
^a Foreign-born population only

According to the Sons of Italy News Bureau, from 1998 to 2002 the enrollment in college Italian language courses grew by 30%, faster than the enrollment rates for French and German. Italian is the fourth most commonly taught foreign language in U.S. colleges and universities behind Spanish, French, and German. According to the U.S. 2000 Census, Italian is the sixth most spoken language in the United States after English, with over 1 million speakers.

As a result of the large wave of Italian immigration to the United States in the late 19th and early 20th centuries, Italian and Sicilian were once widely spoken in much of the U.S., especially in northeastern and Great Lakes area cities like Buffalo, Rochester, Detroit, Chicago, Cleveland and Milwaukee, as well as San Francisco, St. Louis and New Orleans. Italian-language newspapers exist in many American cities, especially New York City, and Italian-language movie theatres existed in the U.S. as late as the 1950s. L'Idea is a bilingual quarterly published in Brooklyn since 1974. Arba Sicula (Sicilian Dawn) is a semiannual publication of the society of the same name, dedicated to preserving the Sicilian language. The magazine and a periodic newsletter offer prose, poetry and comment in Sicilian, with adjacent English translations.

Today, prizes like the Bordighera Annual Poetry Prize, founded by Daniela Gioseffi, Pietro Mastrandrea and Alfredo di Palchi, with support from the Sonia Rraiziss-Giop Foundation and Bordighera Press, which publishes the winners in bilingual editions have encouraged authors to write in Italian. Chelsea Books in New York City and Gradiva Press on Long Island have published many bilingual books due to the efforts of bilingual writers of the diaspora like Paolo Valesio, Alfredo de Palchi, and Luigi Fontanella. Dr. Luigi Bonaffini of the City University of New York, publisher of The Journal of Italian Translation at Brooklyn College, has fostered Italian dialectic poetry throughout Italy and the U.S. Joseph Tusiani of New York and New York University, a distinguished linguist and prize-winning poet born in Italy, paved the way for Italian works of literature in English and has published many bilingual books and Italian classics for the American audience, among them the first complete works of Michelangelo's poems in English to be published in the United States.

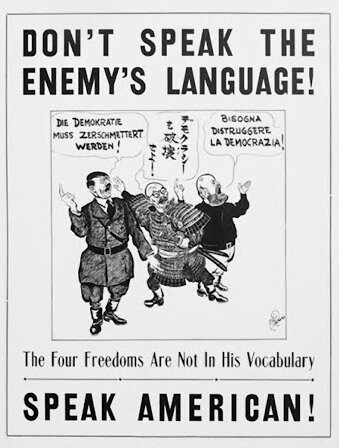
A wartime poster

Author Lawrence Distasi argues that the loss of spoken Italian among the Italian American population can be tied to U.S. government pressures during World War II. During World War II, in various parts of the country, the U.S. government displayed signs that read, "Don't Speak the Enemy's Language". Such signs designated the languages of the Axis powers, German, Japanese and Italian, as "enemy languages". Shortly after the Axis powers declared war on the U.S., many Italian, Japanese and German citizens were interned. Among the Italian Americans, those who spoke Italian, who had never become citizens and who belonged to groups that praised Benito Mussolini, were most likely to become candidates for internment. Distasi claims that many Italian language schools closed down in the San Francisco Bay Area within a week of the U.S. declaration of war on the Axis powers. Such closures were inevitable since most of the teachers in Italian languages were interned.

Despite previous decline, Italian and Sicilian are still spoken and studied by those of Italian American descent and it can be heard in various American communities, especially among older Italian Americans. The official Italian taught in schools is Standard Italian, which is based on 14th century literary Florentine. However, the "Italian" with which Italian Americans are generally acquainted is often rooted in the Regional Italian and Italo-Dalmatian languages their immigrant ancestors brought from Italy to American, primarily southern Italian and Sicilian dialects of pre-unification Italy.

Italian language in the United States

Despite it being the fifth most studied language in higher education (college and graduate) settings throughout America, the Italian language has struggled to maintain being an AP course of study in high schools nationwide. It was only in 2006 that AP Italian classes were first introduced, and they were soon dropped from the national curricula after the spring of 2009. The organization which manages such curricula, the College Board, ended the AP Italian program because it was "losing money" and had failed to add 5,000 new students each year. Since the program's termination in the spring of 2009, various Italian organizations and activists have attempted to revive the course of study.

Web-based Italian organizations, such as ItalianAware, have begun book donation campaigns to improve the status and representation of Italian and Italian American literature in the New York public libraries. According to ItalianAware, the Brooklyn Public Library is the worst offender in New York City. It has 11 books pertaining to the Italian immigrant experience available for checkout, spread across 60 branches.

=== Italian American pidgin ===
Italian American pidgin or Italian American slang is a pidgin language thought to have developed in the early 1900s in American cities with a large Italian population, primarily New York and New Jersey. It soon spread to many Italian communities across cities and metropolitan areas in both the U.S. and Canada. It is not a language in its own right but is a mix of the various Italian dialects and American English.

== Cuisine ==
Italian Americans have had a great influence on the eating habits of America. Italian American TV personalities, such as Mario Batali, Giada DeLaurentiis, Rachael Ray, Lidia Bastianich, and Guy Fieri have hosted popular cooking shows featuring Italian cuisine.

Although heavily influenced by Italian cuisine, especially the Sicilian and Neapolitan cuisine of southern Italian immigrants to the United States, Italian-American cuisine differs in many ways. The increased availability of meat in quantity has led to the birth of typical Italian-American dishes such as spaghetti and meatballs.

== Music ==
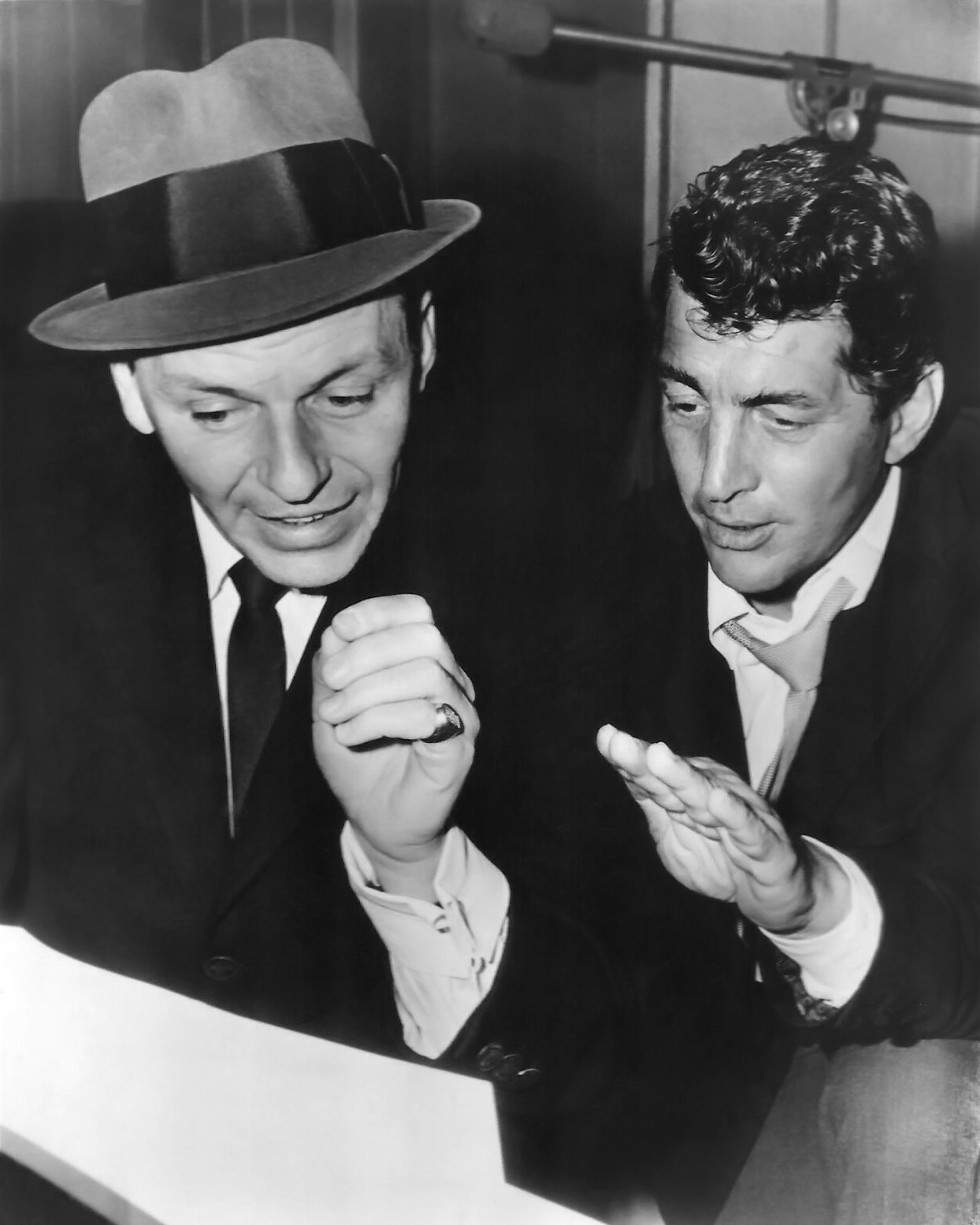
Frank Sinatra and Dean Martin in 1963

Scores of Italian Americans became well known singers in the post-war period, including Frank Sinatra, Mario Lanza, Perry Como, Dean Martin, Tony Bennett, Frankie Laine, Bobby Darin, Julius La Rosa, Nicola Paone, Nancy Sinatra, Connie Francis, Jon Bon Jovi, and Madonna. Italian Americans who hosted popular musical/variety TV shows in the post-war decades included Perry Como (1949–1967), piano virtuoso Liberace (1952–1956), Jimmy Durante (1954–1956), Frank Sinatra (1957–1958), and Dean Martin (1965–1974). Broadway, musical stars included Rose Marie, Carol Lawrence, Anna Maria Alberghetti, Sergio Franchi, Patti LuPone, Ezio Pinza, and Liza Minnelli.

In music composition, Henry Mancini and Bill Conti received numerous Academy Awards for their songs and film scores. Classical and operatic composers John Corigliano, Norman Dello Joio, David Del Tredici, Paul Creston, Dominick Argento, Gian Carlo Menotti, and Donald Martino were honored with Pulitzer Prizes and Grammy Awards. Others such as Nicolas Flagello and Vittorio Giannini have been cited as leading American Neo-Romantic composers whose music gave expression to the basic existential and spiritual concerns of humanity.

In the realm of classical music, several Italian Americans also achieved international acclaim as conductors of major symphony and opera orchestras. Included among them are: Alfredo Antonini, Fausto Cleva, Massimo Freccia, and Arturo Toscanini Several others made significant contributions as operatic vocalists including: Licia Albanese, Charles Anthony Caruso, Loretta Di Franco, Dusolina Giannini, Frank Guarrera, and Rosa Ponselle. Others achieved recognition as leading orchestral instrumentalists including: Carmen Carrozza, Pietro Deiro, Leonardo De Lorenzo, Salvatore Mario de Stefano, Angelo Di Pippo, Nicholas Laucella Joseph Mariano, and John Serry.

Significant contributions were also made by other instrumentalists in both Jazz and Pop music. Included in this group were the guitarists: Al Caiola, Mike Danzi and Tony Mottola.

== Sports ==
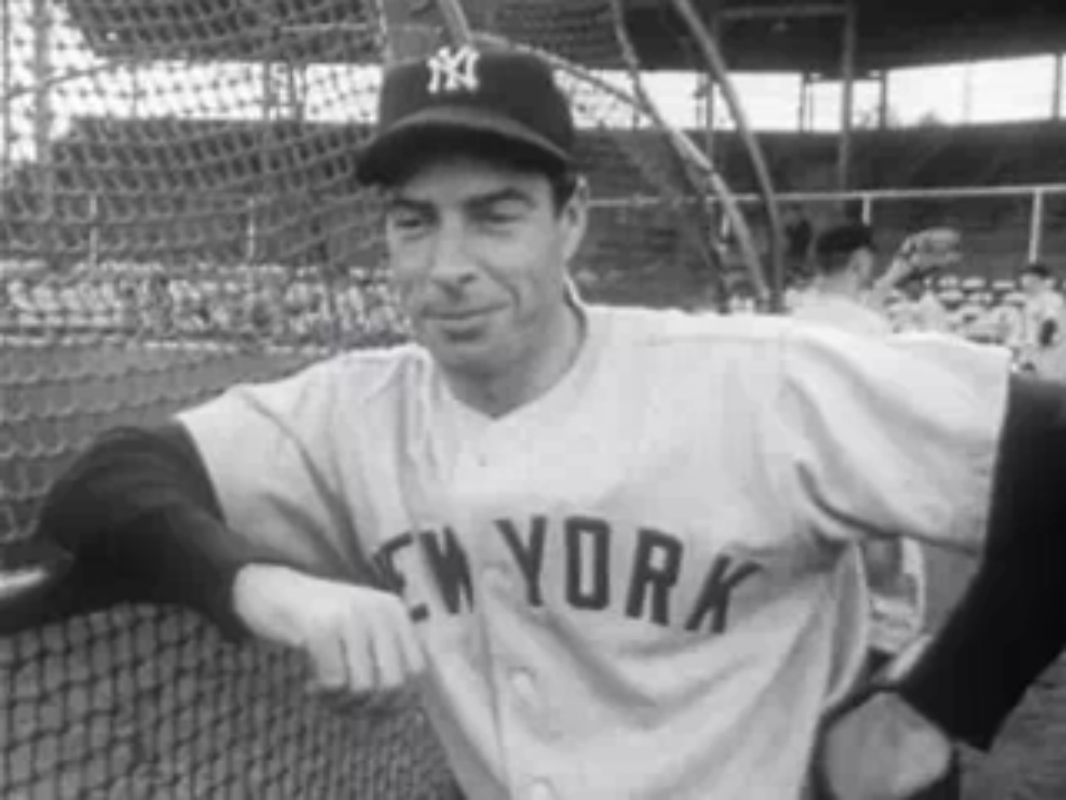
Joe DiMaggio, considered one of the greatest baseball players of all time, in 1951

After World War II, Italian Americans were active in professional sports as players, coaches, and commissioners. Well-known professional baseball coaches in the post-war decades included Yogi Berra, Billy Martin, Tony La Russa, Tommy Lasorda, and Joe Torre. In professional football, Vince Lombardi set the standard of excellence for all coaches to follow. A. Bartlett Giamatti became president of the National Baseball League in 1986 and commissioner of Baseball in 1989. Paul Tagliabue was commissioner of the National Football League from 1989 to 2006.

In college football, Joe Paterno became one of the most successful coaches ever. Seven Italian American players won the Heisman Trophy: Angelo Bertelli of Notre Dame, Alan Ameche of Wisconsin, Gary Beban of UCLA, Joe Bellino of Navy, John Cappelletti of Penn State, Gino Torretta, and Vinny Testaverde of Miami.

In college basketball, a number of Italian Americans became well-known coaches in the post-war decades, including John Calipari, Lou Carnesecca, Rollie Massimino, Rick Pitino, Jim Valvano, Dick Vitale, Tom Izzo, Mike Fratello, Ben Carnevale, and Geno Auriemma.

Italian Americans became nationally known in other diverse sports. Rocky Marciano was the undefeated heavyweight boxing champion from 1952 to 1956; Ken Venturi won both the British and U.S. Open golf championships in 1956; Donna Caponi won the U.S. Women's Open golf championships in 1969 and 1970; Linda Frattianne was the woman's U.S. figure skating champion four years in a row, from 1975 to 1978, and world champion in 1976 and 1978; Willie Mosconi was a 15-time World Billiard champion; Eddie Arcaro was a 5-time Kentucky Derby winner; Mario Andretti was a 4-time national race car champion; Mary Lou Retton won the all-around gold medal in Olympic woman's gymnastics; Matt Biondi won a total of 8 gold medals in Olympic swimming; and Brian Boitano won a gold medal in Olympic men's singles figure skating.

== Folklore ==
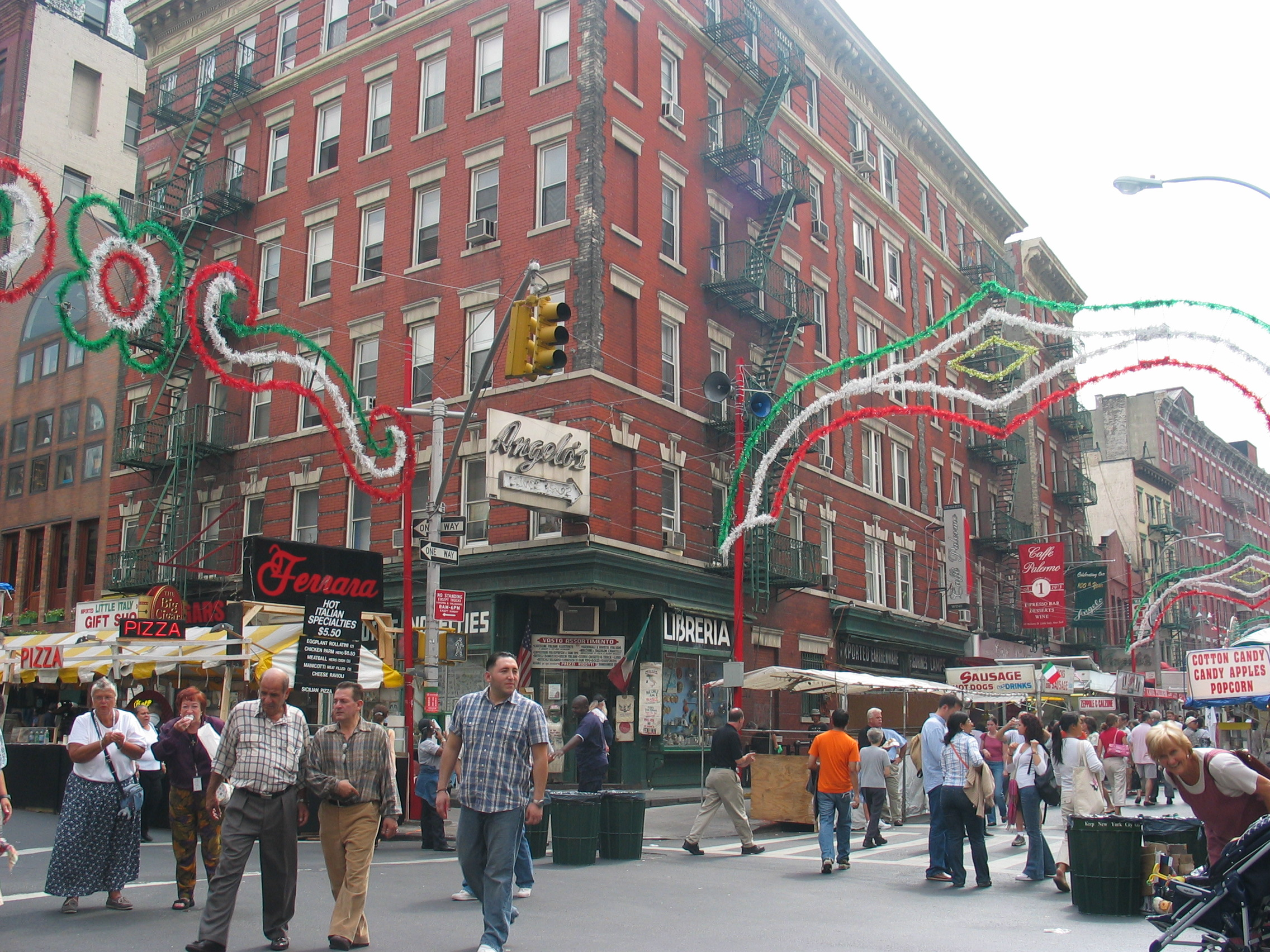
Feast of San Gennaro in New York

One of the most characteristic and popular of Italian American cultural contributions has been their feasts. Throughout the United States, wherever one may find an "Italian neighborhood" (often referred to as "Little Italy"), one can find festive celebrations such as the well-known Feast of San Gennaro in New York City or the unique Our Lady of Mount Carmel "Giglio" Feast in the Williamsburg section of Brooklyn, New York. Italian feasts involve elaborate displays of devotion to Jesus Christ and patron saints. On the weekend of the last Sunday in August, the residents of Boston's North End celebrate the "Feast of all Feasts" in honor of St. Anthony of Padua, which was started over 300 years ago in Montefalcione, Italy. Perhaps the most widely known is Saint Joseph's feast day on March 19. These feasts are much more than simply isolated events within the year. Feast (Festa in Italian) is an umbrella term for the various secular and religious, indoor and outdoor activities surrounding a religious holiday. Typically, Italian feasts consist of festive communal meals, religious services, games of chance and skill and elaborate outdoor processions consisting of statues resplendent in jewels and donations. The celebration usually takes place over the course of several days, and is communally prepared by a church community or a religious organization over the course of several months.

Currently, there are more than 300 Italian feasts celebrated throughout the United States. Notable is Festa Italiana, held in Milwaukee every summer. These feasts are visited each year by millions of Americans from various backgrounds who come together to enjoy Italian music and food delicacies. In the past, as to this day, an important part of Italian American culture centers around music and cuisine.

== Museums ==
There are several museums in the United States, dedicated to Italian American culture:

- San Francisco, California: Museo ItaloAmericano
- Los Angeles, California: Italian American Museum of Los Angeles
- Chicago, Illinois: Casa Italia Chicago
- New Orleans, Louisiana: American Italian Cultural Center
- Albany, New York: American Italian Heritage Association and Museum
- New York, New York: Italian American Museum
- Philadelphia, Pennsylvania: History of Italian Immigration Museum (Filitalia Foundation)
- Staten Island, New York: The Garibaldi-Meucci Museum (GMM)
