= Mary Jo Bona =

American literary scholar

- Born: Chicago, Illinois
- Education: University of Wisconsin (Ph.D.)

Mary Jo Bona is an American literary scholar who has written extensively on Italian-American literature and its history. She is professor of Italian American Studies and chair of the Department of Women's, Gender, and Sexuality Studies at Stony Brook University.

Bona was born in Chicago and earned a Ph.D. in American Literature at the University of Wisconsin. After serving for several years as an associate English professor and chair of the Women's Studies department at Gonzaga University, she received a stipendiary award and admission to the Academy of Teacher Scholars at Stony Brook.

She has authored and edited several scholarly works, including The Voices We Carry: Recent Italian American Women's Fiction (1993). Critic Kenneth Scambray calls The Voices We Carry "a significant contribution to Italian American and women's studies"; Fred Gardaphé calls the anthology "a major step in the development of Italian/American literature"; and Anthony Tamburri writes that the anthology "blazed a trail." Bona's reviews, articles, and poetry have appeared in American Literary History, Italian Americana, MELUS, NWSA Journal, The Women's Review of Books, and other journals. She published a volume of poems, I Stop Waiting for You, in 2014.

Bona first became interested in Italian-American women's literature in the late 1980s after reading Helen Barolini's influential anthology, The Dream Book. She formerly served as president of the Italian American Studies Association, and served on the board of the Society for the Study of the Multi-Ethnic Literature of the United States (MELUS) for six years.

== Books ==
Author:

- Women Writing Cloth: Migratory Fictions in the American Imaginary (2016)
- I Stop Waiting for You: Poems (2014)
- By the Breath of Their Mouths: Narratives of Resistance in Italian America (2010)
- Italian American Literature (2003)
- Claiming a Tradition: Italian American Women Writers (1989)

Editor:

- Multiethnic Literature and Canon Debates (2006)
- Italian Americans and the Arts & Culture (2005)
- Through the Looking Glass: Italian & Italian/American Images in the Media (1996)
- The Voices We Carry: Recent Italian American Women's Fiction (1993)

Contributor:

- "Afterword," The Right Thing to Do by Josephine Gattuso Hendin (1999)
- Taking Parts: Ingredients for Leadership, Participation, and Empowerment (1993)
