= Bordighera Press =

- Founded: 1989
- Founder: Fred Gardaphé, Paolo Giordano, Anthony Julian Tamburri
- Country of origin: United States
- Distribution: Small Press Distribution
- Publication types: Books
- Nonfiction topics: memoir, essay
- Fiction genres: translation, fiction, poetry
- Official website: bordigherapress.org

Bordighera Press is an independent publisher that was founded in 1989 by Fred Gardaphé, Paolo Giordano, and Anthony Julian Tamburri. Committed to Italian and Italian American culture in North America, the press consists of four series (Bordighera Poetry Prize, Crossings, Saggistica, and Via Folios) and two journals (VIA and Italiana).

Based in Indiana, the publisher also has editorial offices located in New York City.

== History ==
Born out of an anthology, "From the Margins, Writings in Italian Americana," and the desire to go beyond stereotypical portrayals, the founders of Bordighera Press wanted to see the full array of the Italian American experience reflected both in popular and scholarly works. Since its inception, the press has established itself as a platform for the voices of Italians and people of Italian descent in North America.

== Bordighera Poetry Prize ==
Between 1998 and 2013, the press awarded the best poetry manuscript in English by an American poet of Italian descent the Bordighera Poetry Prize, hoping to inspire and keep alive the tradition of the Italian language amongst emerging Italian American authors, immigrants, and their descendants.

== Authors ==
- Joe Amato (poet)
- Helen Barolini
- Dennis Barone
- Olivia Kate Cerrone
- Louisa Calio
- Grace Cavalieri
- Emanuel di Pasquale
- Gil Fagiani
- Luigi Fontanella
- Maria Mazziotti Gillan
- Daniela Gioseffi
- Doug Gladstone
- Anna Camaiti Hostert
- Annie Lanzillotto
- Joseph LoGiudice
- Marco Martinelli
- Nick Mileti
- Michael Parenti
- Anthony Julian Tamburri
- Maria Terrone
- Lewis Turco
- Joseph Tusiani
- Sandro Veronesi
- Richard Vetere
- Robert Viscusi
