= Childwold =

1973 novel by Joyce Carol Oates

- First edition
- Author: Joyce Carol Oates
- Language: English
- Genre: novel
- Publisher: Vanguard Press
- Publication date: 1976
- Publication place: United States
- Media type: Print (hardback)
- Pages: 295
- ISBN: 978-0814907771

Childwold is a novel by Joyce Carol Oates first published in 1976 by Vanguard Press.

Childwold's narrative and characters bear similarities to Vladimir Nabokov's 1955 novel Lolita.

== Plot ==
"[T]he action centers around a writer named Kasch whose infatuation with a fourteen-year-old girl, Laney Bartlett, and his subsequent attraction and engagement with her mother, Arlene, ends abruptly when he kills Arlene's former lover, Earl Tuller."

== Reception ==
New York Times literary critic Josephine Gattuso Hendin ranks Childwold as the best of Oates's novels to date. Praising the "verbal brilliance" that characterizes irs writing, Hendin adds this caveat:

[T]he novel's major flaw is exactly an almost superhuman, torrential flow of words that washes out the individual voice and often makes it difficult to tell who is saying what. The rapid-fire flashbacks that open the novel are its least effective part, offering little more than jumbled scenes of violence recollected with nostalgia.

== Interpretation and appraisal ==
Biographer Joanne V. Creighton offers this assessment of Oates's use of interior monologue and stream-of-consciousness in novels The Assassins (1975) and Childwold:

Perhaps Oates is striving for greater correlation between the fragmented lives of her characters and the form of the novel, presenting them by grounding her novels more centrally within the characters' consciousness. But Oates is not always skillful in rendering subjective states directly...because the style encourages Oates's tendency toward excessive repetition. Locked in their various neuroses, psychoses, and depressions, her characters often dwell interminably and insufferably upon their obsessions.

Literary critic Greg Johnson regards Childwold, like Oates's Angel of Light (1981), to be a "poetic novel," as does Oates herself:

I had wanted to create a prose poem in the form of a novel, or a novel in the form of a prose poem: the exciting thing for me was to deal with the tension that arose between the image-centered structure of poetry and the narrative-centered and linear structure of the interplay of persons that constitutes a novel. In other words, poetry focuses upon the image, the particular thing, the emotion, or feeling; while prose fiction focuses upon motion through time and space. The one impulse is toward stasis, the other toward movement.

=== Influence of Vladimir Nabokov's Lolita (1955) ===
Childwold is an homage to Nabokov's famous novel Lolita (1955), "echoing" its themes and characters. Oates's Fitz-John Kasch resembles the middle-aged Humbert Humbert, and his obsession for the 12-year-old Lolita here reimagined as the 14-year-old Laney Bartlett.

Of the novels' respective tragic-comic pedophiles, literary critic Eileen T. Bender writes:

Both are melancholic, aging intellectuals, without issue except for their esoteric, unread manuscripts; both have unslakable sensual appetites; both are in panting pursuit of the virginal, the evanescent, the metamorphic, the premature. Both are arch-fabulators.

Bender stresses that Childwold is more than a mere "imitation" of Lolita. Rather, it serves as a critical "counterstatement," in which Oates shifts the primary focus from the voyeur Kasch to the "responsive, youthful " Laney, "offering the promise of radiance and regeneration."

== Sources ==
- Bender, Eileen T. 1979. "'Paedomorphic' Art: Joyce Carol Oates's Childwold." 1979 in Critical Essays on Joyce Carol Oates, by Linda W. Wagner. pp. 117–122. G. K. Hall & Co., Boston, Massachusetts. ISBN 0-8161-8224-8
- Creighton, Joanne V.. 1979. Joyce Carol Oates. Twayne Publishers, New York. Warren G. French, editor. ISBN 0-8057-7212-X
- Creighton, Joanne V.. 1992. Joyce Carol Oates: Novels of the Middle Years. Twayne Publishers, New York. Warren G. French, editor. ISBN 978-0805776478
- Johnson, Greg. 1987. Understanding Joyce Carol Oates. University of South Carolina Press, Columbia, South Carolina. ISBN 0-87249-524-8
- Hendin, Josephine Gattuso. 1976. Childwold. New York Times, November 28, 1976.https://archive.nytimes.com/www.nytimes.com/books/97/09/21/reviews/oates-childwold.html?_r=1 Accessed 21 January 2025.
- Oates, Joyce Carol. 1973. Childwold. Vanguard Press, New York. ISBN 978-0814907771
