= Joe Amato (poet) =

American writer (born 1955)

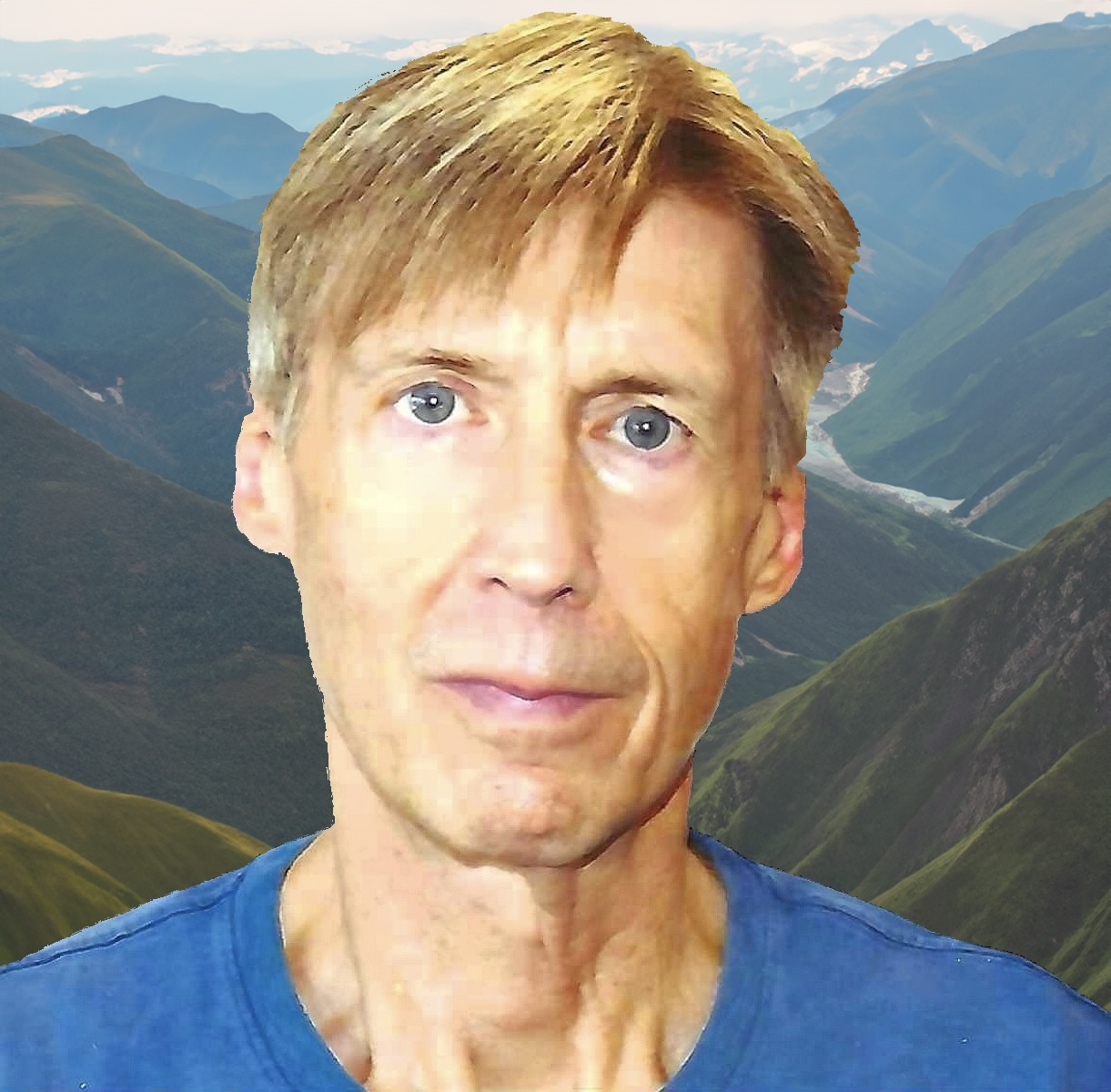
- Born: May 31, 1955 (age 71); Syracuse, New York, U.S.
- Education: Syracuse University (BS); University at Albany, SUNY (MA, DA)
- Writing career
- Genres: poetry, fiction, memoir
- Website: joeamato.net

Joe Amato (born May 31, 1955) is an American writer and poet.

== Biography ==
Amato was born in 1955 in Syracuse, New York. He received BS degrees in mathematics and in mechanical engineering from Syracuse University in 1976. He spent seven years working in project engineering in New York before returning to graduate school and earning an MA and Doctor of Arts in English from University at Albany in 1986 and 1989, respectively. He has since authored eleven books, including a memoir and three novels, and coauthored screenplays with writing partner Kass Fleisher. Amato was the former production manager at Steerage Press, founded by Fleisher in 2011. He taught creative writing and literature for twenty years at Illinois State University in Normal, Illinois.

== Books ==
- Symptoms of a Finer Age (Viet Nam Generation and Burning Cities Press, 1994)
- Bookend: Anatomies of a Virtual Self (SUNY Press, 1997)
- Finger Exorcised (BlazeVOX Books, 2006)
- Under Virga (Chax Press, 2006)
- Industrial Poetics: Demo Tracks for a Mobile Culture (University of Iowa Press, 2006)
- Pain Plus Thyme (Factory School, 2008)
- Once an Engineer: A Song of the Salt City (SUNY Press, 2009)
- Big Man with a Shovel (Steerage Press, 2011)
- Samuel Taylor's Last Night (Dalkey Archive Press, 2014)
- Sipping Coffee @ Carmela's (Lit Fest Press, 2016)
- Samuel Taylor's Hollywood Adventure (Bordighera Press, 2018)
