= Anna Camaiti Hostert =

American philosopher

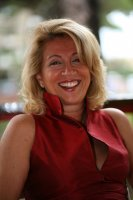
Anna Camaiti Hostert

Anna Camaiti Hostert (born July 19, 1949, in Florence, Italy) is an Italian American philosopher and a scholar of Visual Studies. She lives and works between Italy and the United States.

== Biography ==
She obtained her degree in Philosophy at the University of Pisa (Italy) defending a dissertation with the philosopher Nicola Badaloni. Then she received a PhD in Literature and Film from the University of Chicago. She has taught at Loyola University of Chicago, at the University of Illinois, Chicago, and the University of Rome La Sapienza (Italy). She was Visiting Professor at the University of Southern California (USC) in Los Angeles and the Florence campus of the New York University (NYU) Tisch School of Cinema. She was also Distinguished Visiting Professor at Florida Atlantic University (FAU) in Boca Raton. She was Acting Associate Dean at the Loyola University’s campus in Rome.

In 1999 she founded along the philosopher Mario Perniola the magazine Agalma: Magazine of Aesthetic and Cultural Studies of whose editorial committee she is still a member.

Since 1986 she has been part of the Italian Bar Association of Journalists and for several years the press attaché to the Governor of Tuscany Region. Later, she had a TV program about cinema on RaiSat channel titled Metix from the title of one of her books. She has been a guest at numerous Film Festivals in Italy and of several TV and radio cultural programs. She has collaborated with the director Fiorella Infascelli in the movie Italiani presented at the Venice Film Festival in 1998.

She has written for the newspaper Il Manifesto.

In 2013 she co-founded with Nicola Fano, Gloria Piccioni and Gabriella Mecucci the online culture newspaper Succedeoggi, of which she is a columnist. She holds conferences and seminars at many Italian and foreign institutions. In the last few years, she has combined her theoretical and journalistic work with literary and screenwriting activities.

== Thought ==
=== History of philosophy and politics ===
The initial period of Camaiti Hostert’s research focused on the history of political philosophy following the methodological analysis of Nicola Badaloni, under whose tutelage she studied at the University of Pisa. In her first work, Giuseppe Toniolo. Alle origini del partito cattolico (1984; Giuseppe Toniolo. The origins of the Catholic Party) – that resulted from her dissertation in Philosophy – she traced the intellectual biography of the thinker Giuseppe Toniolo, by retrieving his prominent figure in the Catholic Movement, and casting light on his role in the subsequent foundation of the first Catholic Party in its relationship with the Marxist concept of the main political subject.

The same historical-philosophical perspective defines also the second work by Camaiti Hostert titled Politica e diritto di resistenza. Kant ed Erhard: democrazia e libertà del soggetto (1987, The Politics and the Right of Resistance. Kant and Erhard: Democracy and Human Freedom). In this work Camaiti Hostert has traced the relationship between the German Jacobinism, of which Johann Benjamin Erhard is one of the most representative authors, and Kant’s theory of Public Right, Political Will and Civil Liberty. Through the concepts of «resistance» and «insurrection», she interprets Erhard’s theses as an attempt to build a theory of the antagonistic subject.

=== Cultural studies and identity theory ===
Because of her intellectual, academic and existential relation with the United States and with the socio-cultural dynamics of this country, Camaiti Hostert first developed themes related to comparative literature (see for instance her afterword to the American edition of the Dacia Maraini’s novel, The Silent Duchess, Feminist Press 1998) and then has moved towards the Cultural studies with the analysis of the post-colonial theories, especially by focusing on the subaltern subject and on identity construction.

Through this research, Camaiti Hostert engages a sometimes critical confrontation with many important cultural theorists like Edward Said, Stuart Hall and Homi K. Bhabha and with political thinkers, like Antonio Gramsci. Her major work in this field of investigation is Passing. Dissolvere le identità, superare le differenze (Passing. A Strategy to Dissolve Identities and Remap Differences). Dealing with the complex theme of Alterity as it relates to the Italian women’s movement, especially to the works of Carla Lonzi and the theories of sexual difference, the analysis of Passing tackles the feminist studies, particularly the point of convergence between post-colonial and gender studies (Gayatri C. Spivak, bell hooks, Teresa de Lauretis, Rosi Braidotti) and from that point it expands its reflection to the process of formation of any ethnic and sexual identity.

=== Visual studies and film theory ===
Visual Studies - that were born as a field of interdisciplinary research on the wake of the Anglo-American Cultural Studies – have become since the late 1990s the focus of Camaiti Hostert’s research. In Metix. Cinema globale e cultura visuale (Meltemi 2004, Metix. Global Cinema and Visual Culture) - work that collects Camaiti Hostert’s findings during those years - she has analyzed the structure of the vision, the dynamics of the gaze and the processes of images production in contemporary cinema (mainly American cinema, but not only Hollywood).

Visual Studies in general and Camaiti Hostert’s work in particular, interpret images not as isolated objects, but as clusters of several practices which change use and meaning of the images themselves: if cinema represents the medium from which Camaiti Hostert’s analysis has begun, her analysis expands to all visual languages, including TV, advertisings, Internet. The pivotal passage of the text is the transition from the idea that an image is able to mean something, to the understanding that this ability is tied with the formation of the subject identity.

According to Camaiti Hostert’s theory Visual Studies show the similarities between the analysis of the visual culture and the analysis of the construction of cultural, gender and ethnic identities and differences, with particular attention to the unmasking of visual stereotypes that have represented the various forms of marginality.

This work is linked to Camaiti Hostert’s parallel research into the field of Film Studies. Regarding this domain of studies, the two particularly relevant essays collection (both edited in 2002) are Sentire il cinema (2002; Feeling Cinema) - entirely composed of Camaiti Hostert’s essays and interviews (with directors such Bernardo Bertolucci, Fiorella Infascelli, Wilma Labate and Mario Martone) – and Scene italoamericane. Rappresentazioni cinematografiche degli italiani d’America edited with the Italian American scholar Anthony Julian Tamburri (Luca Sossella editore 2002, American edition Screening Ethnicity. Cinematographic Representations of Italian Americans in the United States, Bordighera Press, 2002), including essays by Ben Lawton, Fred Gardaphé, Alberto Abruzzese among others as well as by Camaiti Hostert and Tamburri.

== Selected works ==
- Giuseppe Toniolo. Alle origini del partito cattolico, Pisa, ETS, 1984
- Politica e diritto di resistenza. Kant ed Erhard: democrazia e libertà del soggetto, Pisa, Servizio Editoriale Universitario, 1987.
- Passing. Dissolvere le identità, superare le differenze, Roma, Castelvecchi, 1996. ISBN 9788886232692 (2ª ed. Roma, Meltemi 2006. ISBN 9788883534560; trad.ing. Passing. A Strategy to Dissolve Identities and Remap Differences, Madison, Farleigh Dickinson University Press, 2007. ISBN 9780838641255).
- Afterword to the American edition of Dacia Maraini's book The Silent Duchess, New York, Feminist Press, 1998 [Postfazione alla edizione americana di D. Maraini, La lunga vita di Marianna Ucrìa]. ISBN 9781558611948
- «Il tempo, la musica, le cose:intervista a Bernardo Bertolucci» in Agalma. Rivista di estetica e studi culturali, No 1, giugno 2000.
- «Pulp Passion and Rusty Feelings» in Agalma. Rivista di estetica e studi culturali, No 1, giugno 2000.
- Sentire il cinema, Firenze, Casalini-Cadmo, 2002. ISBN 9788879232661
- con A. J. Tamburri (a cura di) Scene italoamericane. Rappresentazioni cinematografiche degli italiani d'America, Roma, Luca Sossella editore, 2002. ISBN 9788887995251 (trad.ing. Screening Ethnicity. Cinematographic Representation of Italian Americans in the United States, Florida Atlantic University -Boca Raton, Bordighera Press, 2002. ISBN 9781884419539)
- Introduzione all'edizione italiana di N. Mirzoeff, Introduzione alla cultura visuale, Roma, Meltemi, 2002. ISBN 9788883534546
- «L'identità in sottrazione» in V. Zagarrio (a cura di) Trevico-Cinecittà. L'avventuroso viaggio di Ettore Scola, Venezia, Marsilio 2002. ISBN 9788831780193
- Metix. Cinema globale e cultura visuale, Meltemi, Roma, 2004. ISBN 9788883533167
- «Identità di genere nel cinema italoamerican: Nancy Savoca e Marylou Tibaldo Buongiorno», in G. Muscio e G. Spagnoletti (a cura di), Quei bravi ragazzi. Il cinema italoamericano contemporaneo, Venezia, Marsilio Editori, 2007. ISBN 9788831792653
- Trump non è una fiction. La nuova America raccontata attraverso le serie televisive, Milano-Udine, Mimesis, 2017.
- La vita nelle cose, Mantova, MnM Print Edizioni, 2019.
- with E.A. Cicchino Trump e moschetto. Immagini, fake news e mass media: armi di due populisti a confronto, Milano-Udine, Mimesis, 2020.
