= Kass Fleisher =

American writer (1959–2023)

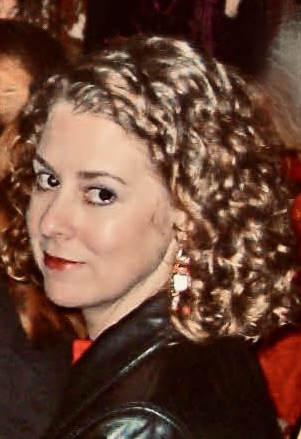
- Born: October 21, 1959; Wilmington, Delaware, U.S.
- Died: January 6, 2023 (aged 63); Normal, Illinois, U.S.
- Education: Dickinson College (BA); University of North Dakota (MA); Binghamton University (PhD)
- Spouse: Joe Amato (m. 1995; div. 2013)
- Writing career
- Genres: Fiction, creative nonfiction
- Website: kassfleisher.com

Helen Kassia Fleisher (October 21, 1959 – January 6, 2023) was an American writer.

== Biography ==
Fleisher was born on October 21, 1959, in Wilmington, Delaware. She earned a BA in English from Dickinson College in 1981, a MA from the University of North Dakota in 1989, and a PhD from Binghamton University in 1993. For a time, she taught English at Idaho State University. In 2003, she began teaching creative writing at Illinois State University in Normal, Illinois. Fleisher was married to Joe Amato from 1995 until 2013. She died on January 6, 2023, at her home in Normal, Illinois.

== Writing ==
Fleisher authored five books of fiction and creative nonfiction, and coauthored screenplays with her writing partner Joe Amato.

Fleisher's first book, The Bear River Massacre and the Making of History (2004), examines both the events, and the cultural forgetting of the 1863 Bear River Massacre. Fleisher became curious about the legacy of the massacre while living in Idaho in 1995. At that time, the National Park Service was developing the Bear River Massacre Site historic memorial, and Fleisher was surprised how little awareness there was of "one of the worst acts of genocide in the history of the United States". The book is organized in three parts. The first section is a synthesis of historical records about the event, titled "What (We Think) Happened". The longer second section, "The Making of History", follows Fleisher's eight-year research process as she interviews local historians, members of the Shoshone, and residents who oppose the memorial. The final section, "Ten Digressions on What's Wrong", presents a postmodernist critique of history-making, intentionally rejecting narrative closure.

=== List of books ===
- The Bear River Massacre and the Making of History (SUNY Press, 2004) ISBN 9780791460634
- Accidental Species: A Reproduction (Chax Press, 2005)
- The Adventurous (Factory School, 2006) ISBN 9781600010002
- Talking out of School: Memoir of an Educated Woman (Dalkey Archive Press, 2008) ISBN 9781564785176
- Dead Woman Hollow (SUNY Press, 2012) ISBN 9781438442624
- Editor, with Caitlin M. Alvarez. Litscapes: Collected US Writings 2015 (Steerage Press, 2015) ISBN 978-0983632689
