= Perniola =

Perniola is an Italian surname. Notable people with the surname include:

- Mario Perniola (1941–2018), Italian author, philosopher, and professor
- Michele Perniola (born 1998), Italian singer
