= Isabella Vincentini =

Italian poet, essayist and literary critic

Maria Isabella Vincentini (born in 1954) is an Italian poet, essayist and literary critic.

She graduated in Humanities at La Sapienza University in Rome, where she also gained a post-graduate degree in modern philology. The focus of her dissertation was Nietzsche’s philological writings and the classical world of Greek tragedy. Topics which are revisited both in her essays and in her poetry, which is influenced by contemporary Greek poetry, especially by that of Odisseas Elitis and Giorgos Seferis, both of which she has dealt with extensively in her criticism. Her essays focus on the debate on the theory of literature between hermeneutics, deconstruction and postmodernism (Blanchot, Deleuze, Foucault, Lyotard, Todorov, de Man and Frye) and aim to provide a thematic reading of twentieth-century poetry (Mallarmé, Gabriele D’Annunzio, Ungaretti, Quasimodo, Montale, Luzi and Rosselli).

She has published anthologies of Italian poets who came to light after the so-called Neoavanguardia, a movement which dominated the nineteen-sixties, as well as essays, monographs and interviews with them. She has also published two collections of poems: Le ore e i giorni (The Hours and the Days) and Diario di bordo (Logbook). She has worked on cultural programmes for RAI (the Italian state broadcasting company) and in 1999 she founded with the philosopher Mario Perniola and a group of Italian and international intellectuals the magazine Agalma of whose editorial committee she is still a member.

== Selected works ==
- La pratica del desiderio. I giovani poeti degli anni ’80 (The practice of desire. The young poets of the 80s), Salvatore Sciascia Editore, Caltanissetta, 1986.
- Colloqui sulla poesia. Le ultime tendenze (Talks on poetry. The latest trends), Edizioni RAI, Turin, 1991.
- Varianti da un naufragio. Il viaggio marino dai simbolisti ai post-ermetici (Variations from a shipwreck. The sea journey from the Symbolists to the post-hermetics), Mursia, Milan, 1994.
- Diario di bordo (Logbook), I Quaderni del Battello Ebbro, Porretta Terme, 1998.
- Atene. Tra i muscoli dei Ciclopi (Athens. Between the Muscles of the Cyclops), Unicopli Edizioni, Milan, 2002.
- Le ore e i giorni (The Hours and the Days), La Vita Felice, Milan, 2008.
- Lettere a un guaritore non ferito (Letters to a not wounded healer), La Vita Felice, Milan, 2009.
