= Joseph Sciorra =

American cultural historian (1955–2026)

Joseph Umberto Sciorra (April 4, 1955 – October 5, 2026) was an Italian American folklorist and cultural historian. He specialized in Italian American culture. He was Director of Academic and Cultural Programs at the John D. Calandra Italian American Institute (Queens College/CUNY) from 1999 until his death.

Sciorra died from a heart attack on October 5, 2026, at the age of 71.

== Books ==
- Built with Faith: Italian American Imagination and Catholic Material Culture in New York City (University of Tennessee Press, 2015)
- Editor of Italian Folk: Vernacular Culture in Italian-American Lives (Fordham University Press, 2011)
