= Antonio Barolini =

Italian poet and novelist (1910–1971)

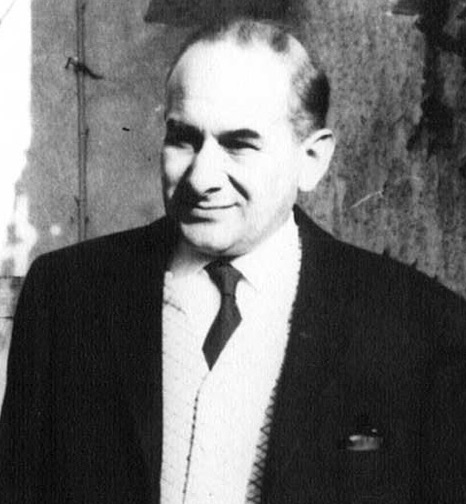
- Antonio Barolini (1969)
- Born: 29 May 1910; Vicenza, Italy
- Died: 21 January 1971 (aged 60); Rome, Italy
- Occupations: Writer, poet, journalist
- Spouse: Helen Barolini
- Children: Teodolinda Barolini, Susanna Mengacci, Nicoletta Barolini
- Writing career
- Notable works: Diario americano, La gaia gioventù

Antonio Barolini (29 May 1910 – 21 January 1971) was an Italian writer, poet, and journalist.

== Early life ==
Antonio Barolini was born in Vicenza to a family of Venetian navigators. His father, Giuseppe Barolini, an officer in the Regia Marina (Royal Italian Navy), died in 1919 from complications of an illness contracted during World War I. Antonio's grandfather, Sebastiano Barolini, was a Venetian sea captain whose schooner, the San Spiridione, is believed to have sunk, resulting in his death.

Following his father's death, Barolini developed a deep bond with his mother, Maria Lucia Albarello, and his sisters. The family was shaped by traditional Catholic and patriarchal values characteristic of the Veneto region. In 1929, Barolini left school and began working at the Banca Cattolica del Veneto.

== Career ==
=== Poetry ===
Barolini debuted as a poet in 1930 with a self-published collection, Cinque canti. In 1938, he published La gaia gioventù, imbued with a religious sensibility that deepened in later collections: Il meraviglioso giardino (1941), Poesie di dolore in morte di Caterina e tre preghiere in aggiunta (1943), and Il veliero sommerso (1949). These works were later compiled into an anthology edited by Geno Pampaloni in 1968.

In 1959, he published the poetry collection Elegie di Croton, inspired by his time living in Croton-on-Hudson, New York. It was later translated into English by his wife, Helen Barolini, and published with a preface by Luigi Barzini.

=== Journalism and fiction ===
Barolini also worked as a journalist and fiction writer. He became editor of Il Giornale di Vicenza on 25 July 1943, after the fall of Fascism. His antifascist stance led to a 15-year prison sentence from the Italian Social Republic, forcing him into hiding for 20 months.

In the 1960s, he directed L'approdo, RAI's most prominent literary television program of the era.

His prose, often set in small towns in the Veneto region, explored religious and ethical themes. His early novel, Le giornate di Stefano (1930), was later revised and reissued in 1969 as La memoria di Stefano. He authored sixteen stories translated into English by Helen Barolini and published in The New Yorker, later compiled in the volume Our Last Family Countess and Related Stories (1960), published in Italian as L'ultima contessa di famiglia (1968).

== Personal life ==
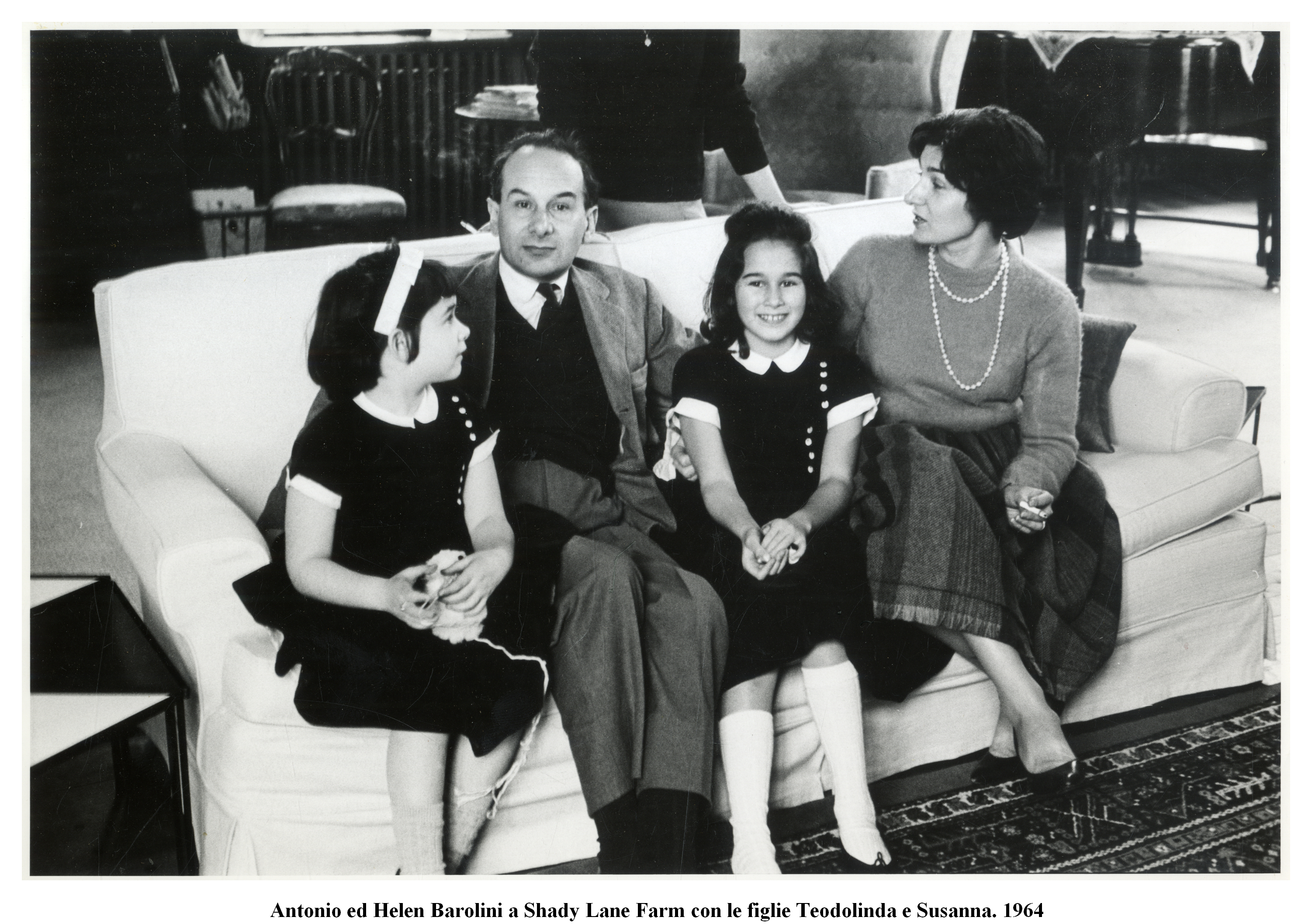
Antonio and Helen Barolini at Shady Lane Farm with daughters Teodolinda and Susanna, 1964.

In 1950, Barolini married American writer Helen Francis Mollica, who would become known as Helen Barolini. The couple moved to the United States, where Barolini served as a long-time correspondent for the newspaper La Stampa. They had three daughters:Teodolinda Barolini, a Dante scholar, Susanna Barolini Mengacci, and Nicoletta Barolini.

== Legacy ==
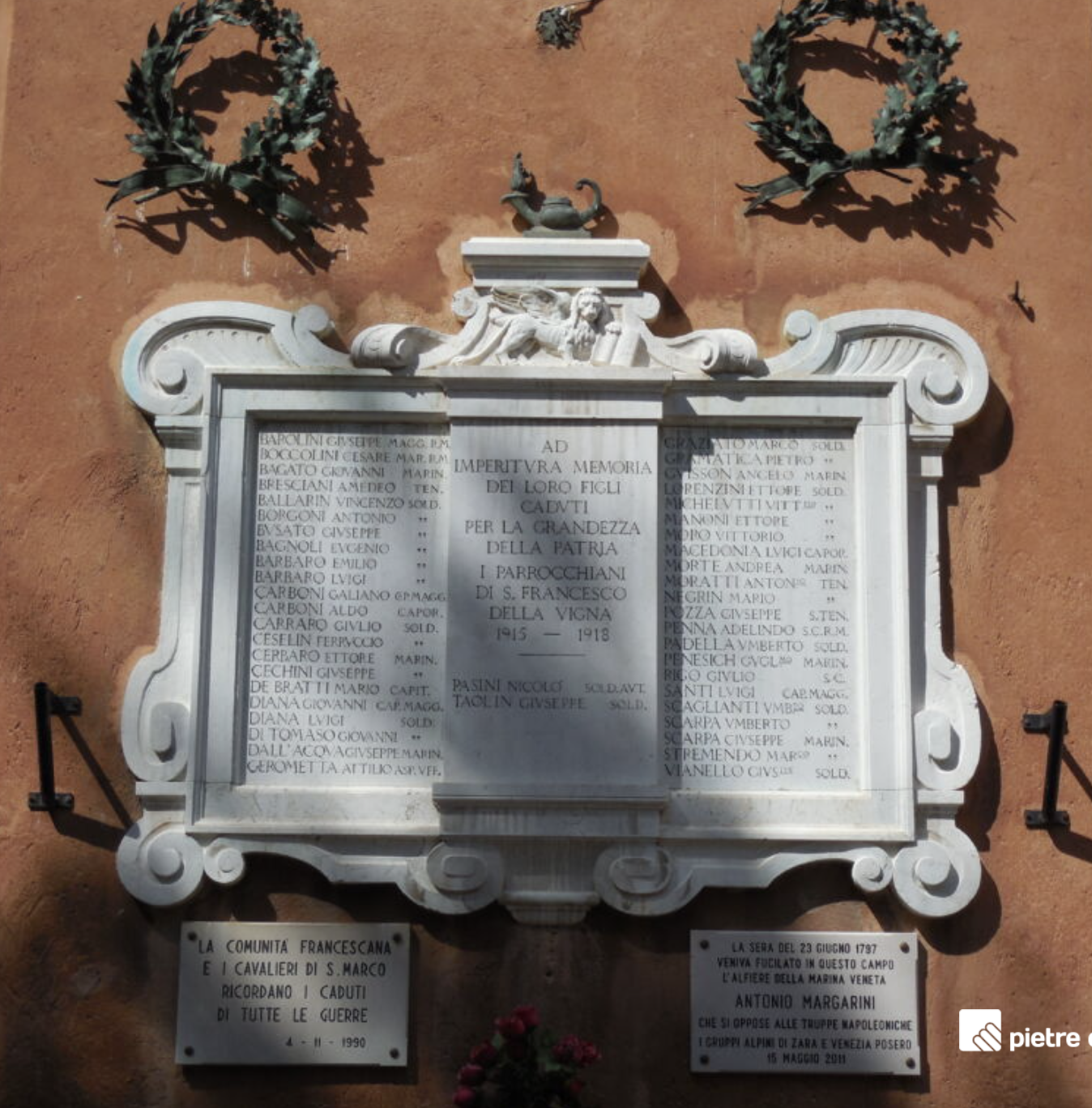
WWI memorial in Venice listing Giuseppe Barolini, father of Antonio Barolini.

Barolini is commemorated on two World War I memorial plaques:

- one in Vicenza, dedicated to merchant mariners from the city;
- one at the Church of San Francesco della Vigna in Venice, dedicated to parishioners who died in the war.

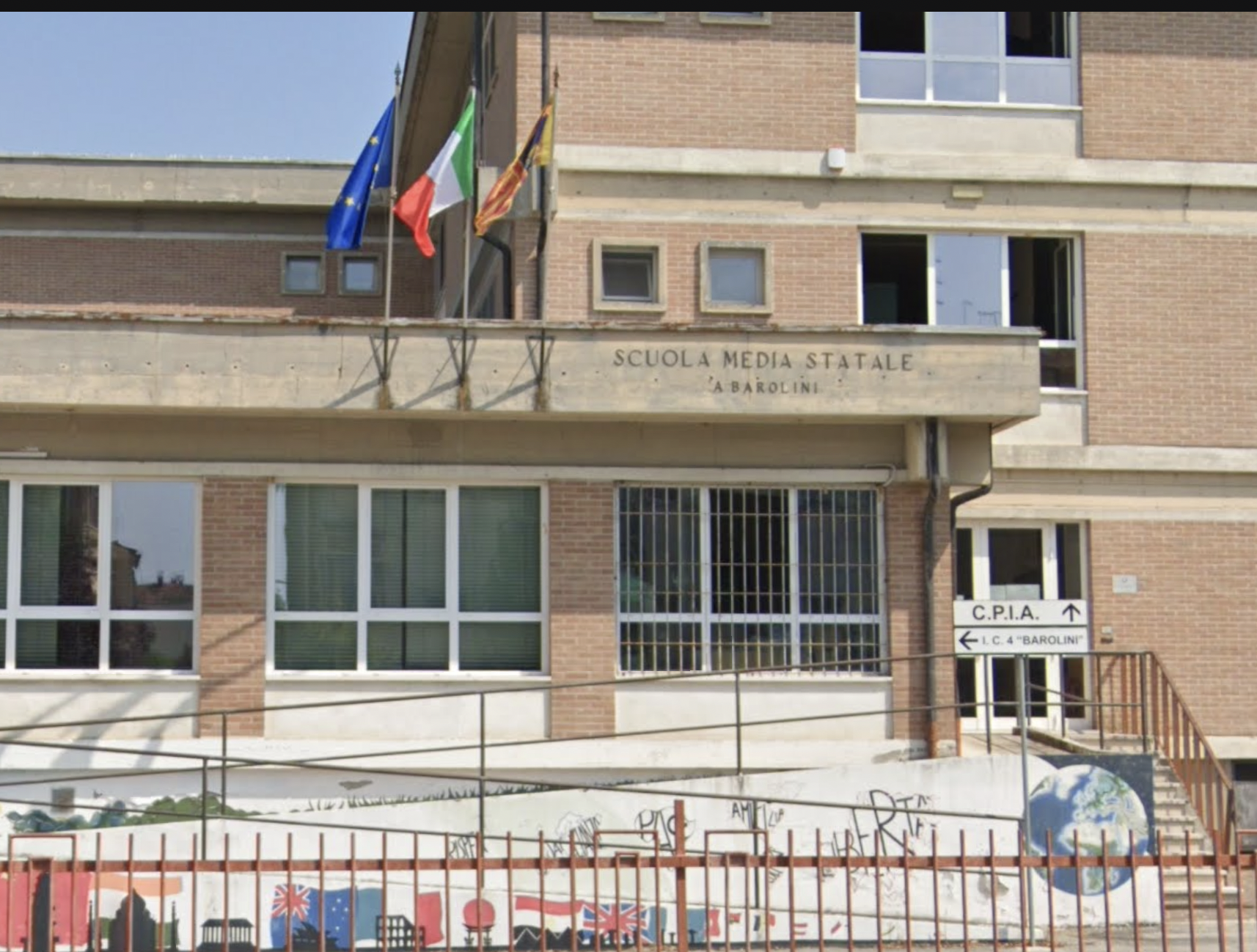
Scuola Media Statale "A. Barolini" in Vicenza, named after Antonio Barolini.

The middle school Scuola Media Statale A. Barolini in Vicenza is named in his honor.

== Works ==
=== Poetry ===
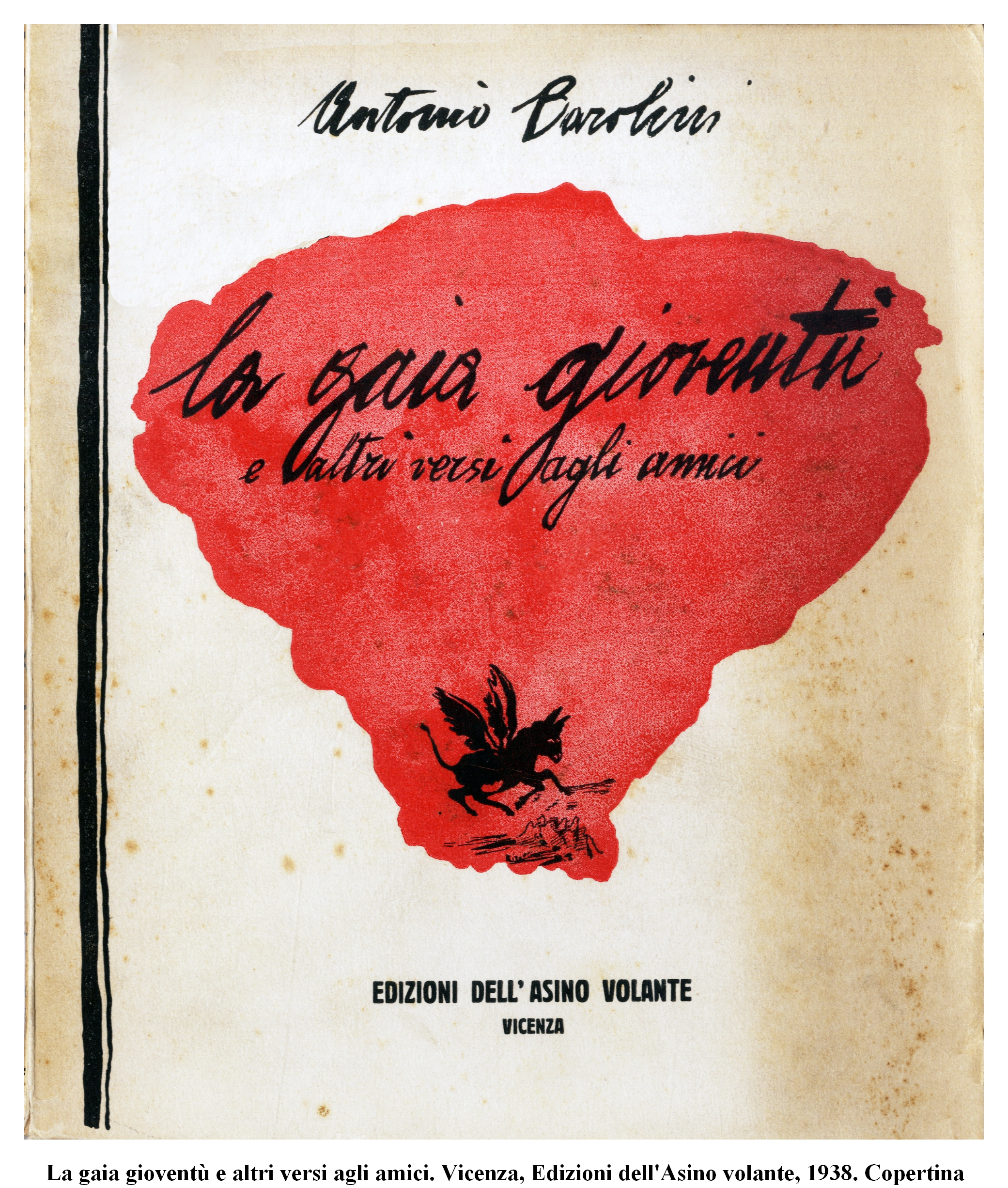
Cover of Antonio Barolini’s poetry collection, “La gaia gioventù e altri versi agli amici” (1938).

- La gaia gioventù e altri versi agli amici (Vicenza, Edizioni dell'asino volante, 1938; reissued Venice, Neri Pozza, 1953)
- Il meraviglioso giardino (Vicenza, Pellicano, 1941)
- Poesie di dolore in morte di Caterina e tre preghiere in aggiunta, ed. Neri Pozza (Vicenza, Il Pellicano, 1943)
- Viaggio col veliero San Spiridione (Vicenza, Il Pellicano, 1946)
- Poesie alla madre (Venice, Neri Pozza, 1960)
- L'angelo attento; Il meraviglioso giardino e altre poesie inedite, ed. Geno Pampaloni (Milan, Feltrinelli, 1968)
- Elegie di Croton (Milan, Feltrinelli, 1959)
- Croton Elegies, trans. Helen Barolini, preface by Luigi Barzini (Montreal, Guernica, 1991)

=== Prose ===
- Una lunga pazzia (Milan, Feltrinelli, 1962)
- Le notti della paura (Milan, Feltrinelli, 1967)
- La memoria di Stefano (Milan, Feltrinelli, 1969)
- Duet, with Helen Barolini (Vicenza, Neri Pozza, 1966)
- Giornate di Stefano (Padua, G. Tolomei, 1943)
- Il paradiso che verrà (Florence, Vallecchi, 1972)
- Il veliero sommerso (Vicenza, Il Pellicano, 1949)
- L'omino del pepe e altri racconti, ed. Tommaso Di Salvo (Milan, La Nuova Italia, 1970)
- L'ultima contessa di famiglia (Milan, Feltrinelli, 1968)
- Our Last Family Countess and Related Stories, illus. Tony Palladino (New York, Harper & Brothers, 1960)
- Meditazione sul miracolo del pane e del vino (Venice, Neri Pozza, 1969)
- Ritratto di un quacchero (Venice, Neri Pozza, 1967)
- Statua ferma, preface by Elpidio Jenco (Genoa, Emiliano Degli Orfini, 1934)
- Diario di clandestinità e altri scritti in tempo di guerra (1943–1945), eds. Susanna and Teodolinda Barolini (Vicenza/Milan, Neri Pozza, 2020)

== Honors ==
- Premio Saint Vincent for Journalism (1953)
- Premio Bagutta, co-winner with Enrico Emanuelli for Elegie di Croton (1960)
- Premio Selezione Campiello for Le notti della paura (1963)
- Premio Nazionale Letterario Pisa for Poetry (1966)
- Premio "Amelia" (1966)

== See also ==
- Helen Barolini
- Teodolinda Barolini
