= Agalma (journal) =

Italian academic journal

- Discipline: Philosophy, Cultural Studies, Aesthetics
- Language: Italian
- Edited by: Luigi Antonio Manfreda

Publication details
- History: 2000–present
- Publisher: Mimesis (Italy)
- Frequency: Biannual

Standard abbreviations
- ISO 4: Agalma

Indexing
- ISSN: 1723-0284
- OCLC no.: 499179471

Links
- Journal homepage

Agalma: Rivista di Studi Culturali e di Estetica is an academic journal dedicated to cultural studies and aesthetics. It was established in 2000 by the philosopher Mario Perniola and a group of Italian and international intellectuals in response to the widely felt discontent with the international and Italian philosophical and cultural contexts at the time. Its purpose is to provide a forum for the theoretical work around cultural studies and aesthetics in Italy. The title of the journal reflects its aims, contents, and orientation. "Agalma" is an ancient Greek word that means ornament, gift, image, and statue. It possesses a broad meaning in which economic value, aesthetic aspects, cultural studies, and symbolic power come together. The first part of an issue is usually monographic and connected to the theme of an international conference organized by the Chair of Aesthetics of the University of Rome Tor Vergata and other cultural institutions. The other sections include discussions, interviews, and reviews covering a wide range of concepts associated to both Western and non-Western philosophical thought.

== Collaborators ==
- Anna Camaiti Hostert
- Bernardo Bertolucci
- Bruno Latour
- Isabella Vincentini
- Jean Baudrillard
- Joseph Kosuth
- Luc Boltanski
- Michel Maffesoli
- Peter Burke
- Richard Shusterman

== See also ==
- List of philosophy journals
