= Tim Risher =

American composer (born 1957)

Tim Risher (born 1957) is an American composer. Risher received his B.A. in Music at the University of Central Florida and his M.M. in music composition from Florida State University. While living in Tallahassee, Florida, Risher was a member of the new music ensembles Paragaté and Tallahassee Camerata.

Risher's output is typically tonal, with primary influences being minimal music, American and Brazilian popular musics, early music, and American shape note hymnody. Most works feature the use of conventional harmony, with great clarity of individual melodic lines. Risher's works transcend the superficiality of much popular music, however, in their frequent use of complex canonic and polyphonic structures and additive rhythms.

Risher composes prolifically for ensembles ranging from concert band to Chinese traditional instrumental ensemble. He has also composed works for electronic media and incidental music for theatrical works. His most significant output, however, comprises works for brass instruments (a preference likely shaped by his experience as a trombonist) and for early (Medieval, Renaissance, and Baroque) instrument ensembles.

Risher's works for early instruments have been commissioned by a number of major ensembles, including Palladian Ensemble, Baroque Northwest, Tintagel, and Trio Dolce. Although his works for early instruments are clearly composed from a twentieth (or twenty-first) century point of reference, Risher's writing for such instruments is surprisingly idiomatic, showing his great familiarity with early instruments and genres. Among Risher's favorite forms for such works are the ground bass and chaconne.

His music has been released on the Index, PhonoStatic, and Discus record labels and his scores are published by Wehr's Music House.

Risher lived in Hamburg, Germany between the years of 1995 and 2005, and now lives in North Carolina.

He is a member of the electronic group "Paragaté", and has released a set of CDs on the Camerata label.

== Selected works ==
- 1978 - 3 Songs for tenor voice and guitar
- c. 1978 - Flute Sonata, flute and piano
- c. 1978 - Tantamount, flute and guitar
- 1981 - Stylized Dances, flute and guitar
- 1985 - Way Beyond the Looking Glass, piano
- 1987 - Jerusalem, guitar and cello
- 1989 - My Way Is, baritone and cello
- 1990 - Broken Motet, baritone, oboe, English horn, and 2 bassoons
- 1990 - Private Music II, 2 pianos
- 1993 - Kleine Stücke und große Dinge, flute, oboe, clarinet, alto saxophone, piano, electric bass guitar, and drum set
- 1995 - Elysian, sheng (Chinese mouth organ), 2 electric guitars, electric bass guitar, 2 pianos, and percussion
- 1996 - Over and Under, early music quartet (baroque violin, alto recorder, baroque guitar, and bass viola da gamba)
- 1997 - Music from Nowhere, dizi (Chinese bamboo flute), sheng (Chinese mouth organ)
- 1997-2018 - Sermon, solo voices, choir (SATB), and organ
- 2004-05 - Preludes and Postludes, solo piano
- 2005 - Southern Harmony, wind band
- 2006 - Aviary Corridor, soprano voice, flute, string quartet, and piano. Poem by Charles Alexander.
- 2010 - The Lord's Prayer, mixed choir (SATTBB).
- 2011 - Have Mercy, O God (Miserere) choir (SATB).
- 2012 - Drei Sätze, wind ensemble
- 2012-2021 - Fall of Reason, clarinet in B-flat, violin, viola, electric bass (guitar), and piano.Also in other versions
- 2019 - Fibonacci Poems, tenor voice and piano. Poetry by Colin Bell.
- 2021 - Evening Service I, SATB and organ. In English.
- 2021 - Missa L'homme armé, SATB and organ. In English. Kyrie, Gloria, Sanctus, Agnus Dei.

== See also ==
- Minimalist music
