= Teodolinda Barolini =

Professor and scholar of Italian

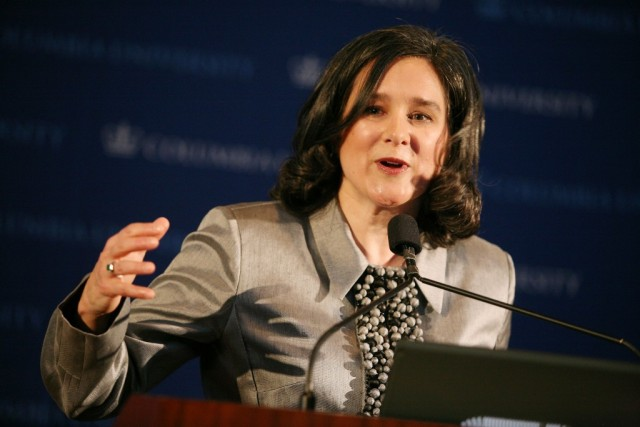
- Teodolinda Barolini, 2016
- Born: December 19, 1951; Syracuse, New York
- Occupation: Professor of Italian
- Parents: Antonio Barolini; Helen Barolini

Academic work
- Discipline: Italian literature
- Sub-discipline: Dante studies

Teodolinda Barolini (born December 19, 1951) is the Lorenzo Da Ponte Professor of Italian at Columbia University, and has twice served as Chair of the Department of Italian (1992–2004, 2011–2014).

== Early life ==
Barolini was born December 19, 1951, in Syracuse, New York. She is the daughter of Antonio Barolini and Helen Barolini.

== Career ==
In 1998, Barolini was awarded a Guggenheim Fellowship for the study of Italian literature. From 1997 to 2003, she served as president of the Dante Society of America. She was elected to the American Philosophical Society in 2002. In 2007, she won a Flaiano Prize in Italian Studies. She is currently the editor-in-chief of Columbia University's Digital Dante website.

She has written on the poetry of Dante, Petrarch and Boccaccio.

== Personal life ==
Barolini is married to James J. Valentini, professor of Chemistry at Columbia and the sixteenth Dean of Columbia College.
