= Maria Mazziotti Gillan =

American poet (born 1940)

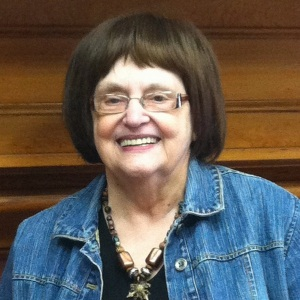
- Maria Mazziotti Gillan at the Poetry Center at Passaic County Community College.
- Born: 12 March 1940 (age 86); Paterson, New Jersey
- Website: mariagillan.com

Maria Mazziotti Gillan is an American poet.

== Life ==
Maria Mazziotti Gillan was born March 12, 1940, in an Italian enclave in Paterson, New Jersey's Riverside neighborhood.

She attended Paterson public schools and is a graduate of Eastside High School.

She graduated from Seton Hall University and from New York University with an MA In literature. She enrolled in a Ph.D. program at Drew University from 1977 to 1980. She married Dennis Gillan; they have two children, John and Jennifer, and two grandchildren, Caroline and Jackson.

She is the founder and executive director of the Poetry Center at Passaic County Community College in Paterson, New Jersey, and editor of the Paterson Literary Review, and is the director of the creative writing program and professor of poetry at Binghamton University-SUNY. Gillan founded Poetry Center at Passaic County Community College in 1980, after receiving a grant from the State Council on the Arts, and featured speakers including Allan Ginsberg, Amiri Baraka, and Stanley Kunitz.

She has published 22 books. One of her most recent is The Girls in the Chartreuse Jackets (Redux Consortium, 2014), a collection of her poetry and watercolor artwork. Her craft book, Writing Poetry to Save Your Life: How to Find the Courage to Tell Your Stories (MiroLand, Guernica) was published in 2013.

She is co-editor with her daughter Jennifer of four anthologies: Unsettling America, Identity Lessons, and Growing Up Ethnic in America (Penguin/Putnam) and Italian-American Writers on New Jersey (Rutgers).

Since 2012 she has been in the Honour Committee of Immagine & Poesia, the artistic literary movement founded in Turin, Italy, with the patronage of Aeronwy Thomas (Dylan Thomas's daughter).

She lives in Hawthorne, New Jersey, and is a professor emeritus at SUNY-Binghamton.

== Awards ==
- 2011 Barnes & Noble Writers for Writers Award from Poets & Writers
- 2008 American Book Award for her book, All That Lies Between Us
- 2008 [Chancellor’s Award for Scholarship and Creative Endeavor] from Binghamton University
- 2008 [Sheila Motton Award]
- 2014 AWP George Garrett Award

== Works ==
=== Books of poetry ===
- The Weather of Old Seasons, Cross-Cultural Communications, 1989, ISBN 978-0-89304-435-0
- Where I Come From, 1995, Guernica Editions, ISBN 978-1-55071-005-2
- Things My Mother Told Me, Guernica Editions, 1999, ISBN 978-1-55071-021-2
- Italian Women in Black Dresses, Guernica, 2002, ISBN 1-55071-156-3
- Maria Mazziotti Gillan: Greatest Hits 1975-2002, Pudding House Publications, April 2003, ISBN 1-58998-177-4
- Talismans/Talismani, Ibiskos Editions, 2006, ISBN 88-7841-242-2
- All That Lies Between Us, Guernica Editions, 2007, ISBN 978-1-55071-261-2
- What We Pass On: Collected Poems 1980-2009, Guernica Editions, 2010, ISBN 978-1550713046
- The Place I Call Home, NYQ Books, 2012, ISBN 978-1935520894
- Ancestors' Song, Bordighera Press, 2013, ISBN 978-1599540634
- The Silence in an Empty House, NYQ Books, 2013, ISBN 978-1935520894
- The Girls in the Chartreuse Jackets, Redux Consortium, 2014, ISBN 978-0991152322
- Paterson Light and Shadow, Serving House Books, 2017, ISBN 978-0997779752

=== Anthologies ===
- Mary Ann Vigilante Mannino; Justin Vitiello, eds. (2003). "Shame and Silence in My Work". Breaking open: reflections on Italian American women's writing. Purdue University Press. ISBN 978-1-55753-243-5.
- Melissa Tuckey, ed. (2018). Ghost Fishing: An Eco-Justice Poetry Anthology. University of Georgia Press. ISBN 978-0820353159.
- Garrison Keillor, ed. (2006). "After School on Ordinary Days". Good Poems for Hard Times. Penguin Group. ISBN 978-0-14-303767-5.
- Liz Rosenberg, ed. (2000). "Oak Place Musings". Light-Gathering Poems. Macmillan. ISBN 978-0-8050-6223-6.

=== Editor ===
- Italian American Writers on New Jersey, editors Maria Mazziotti Gillan, Jennifer Gillan, Edvige Giunta, Rutgers University Press, November 2003
- Identity Lessons, editors Maria M. Gillan, Jennifer Gillan, Penguin Putnam, 1999 ISBN 978-0-14-027167-6
- Growing Up Ethnic in America: Contemporary Fiction About Learning to Be American, editors Maria Mazziotti Gillan, Jennifer Gillan, San Val, Incorporated, 1999 ISBN 978-0-613-21652-4
- Unsettling America: An Anthology of Contemporary Multicultural Poetry, editors Maria Mazziotti Gillan, Jennifer Gillan, Paw Prints, 2008 ISBN 978-1-4395-0933-3
