= Anthony Julian Tamburri =

American academic

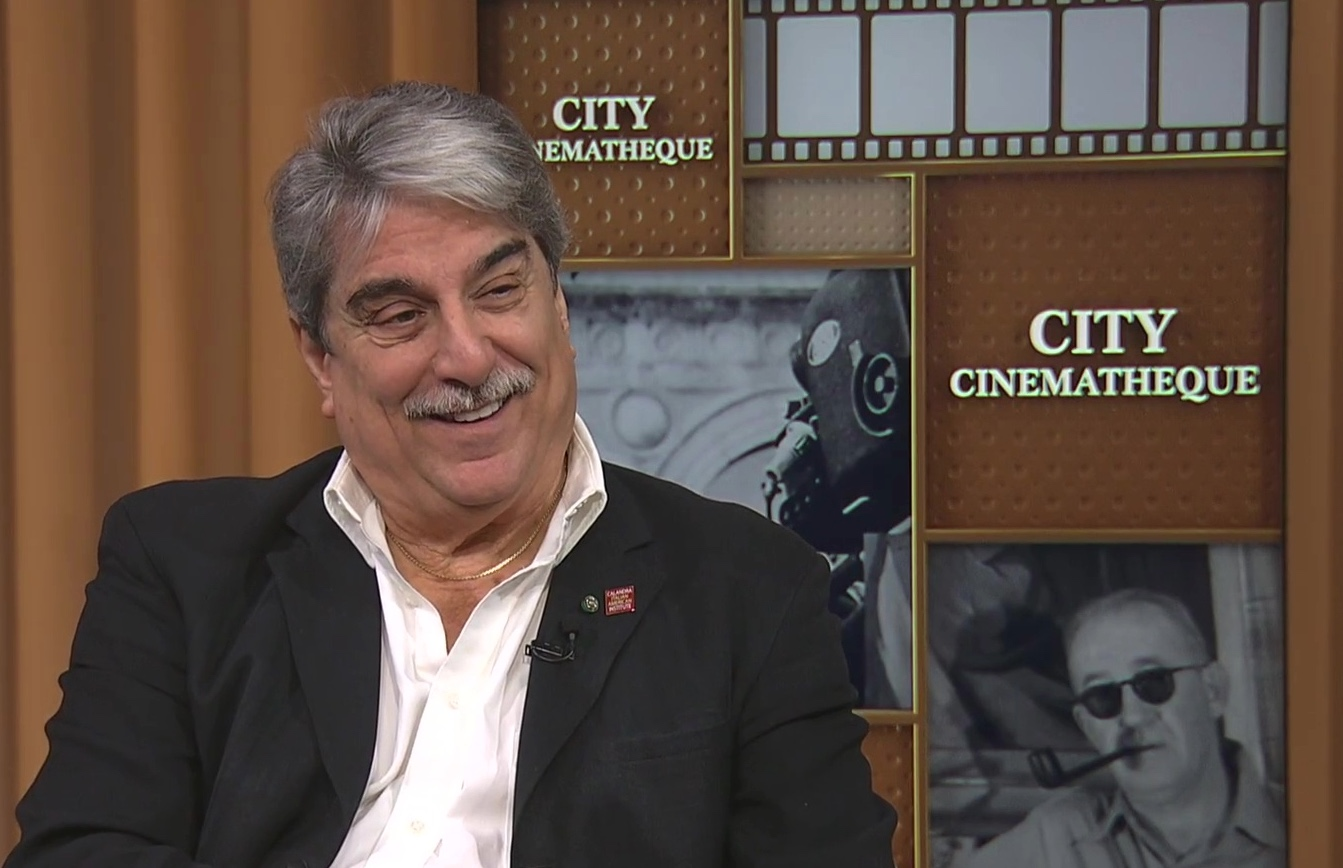
Tamburri on CUNY TV's City Cinematheque, 2026

Anthony Julian Tamburri is the seventh executive director and longest serving with the title of Dean of the John D. Calandra Italian American Institute of Queens College, CUNY and Distinguished Professor of European Languages and Literatures. He has written over one hundred thirty journal articles and book chapters, and twenty-one books.

== Biography ==
Born and raised in Stamford, Connecticut Tamburri earned degrees from Southern Connecticut State University (BS, Italian & Spanish), Middlebury College (MA, Italian), and the University of California, Berkeley (PhD, Italian & Spanish). He taught both Italian and Spanish at the high-school level, and Italian language and literature at Smith, Middlebury, and Auburn, and Italian and Italian/American studies at Purdue University, before moving to Florida Atlantic University where he served first as Chair of the Department of Languages & Linguistics and then Associate Dean for Research, Graduate, and Interdisciplinary Studies, as well as Director of the PhD in Comparative Studies.

Tamburri received various academic and scholarly awards and grants. While at UC Berkeley, he was awarded a Regents Scholarship and the Italian-American Fellowship. He also received a Certificate of Appreciation for Distinguished Contribution to the National Defense while at Purdue University, where he also received numerous Research Foundation Grants. Southern Connecticut State University named him its Distinguished Alumnus for 2000. In 2006, he received the Association of Italian American Educators Award for Promotion of Italian Language and Culture. In 2010, the president of Italy, Giorgio Napolitano, conferred upon him motu proprio the honor of Cavaliere dell'Ordine al Merito della Repubblica Italiana. He also received that same year the Frank Stella Person of the Year Award from ILICA (Italian Language Inter-Cultural Alliance). In 2013, he received the AATI Award for Distinguished Service for Colleges and Universities. Other more recent recognitions for his work in Italian culture include the Italian American Heritage Society of Connecticut (2016) and the Joseph Coccia Jr. Heritage, Language and Culture Award exceptional efforts by word and deed in promoting and preserving our Italian Heritage, Language or Culture (2016).

Tamburri is a member of a number of organizations for which he has also held several administrative positions. He was a Delegate for Foreign Languages of the Modern Language Association, a member of its Executive Committee for the Division on Modern Italian Literature, and co-founder, with Fred Gardaphé, of the Discussion Group on Italian/American Literature. He was the newsletter editor for the American Italian Historical Association for eight years, a member of its executive council since 1993, and its president from 2003–2007. He was the vice president of the American Association of Teachers of Italian for the biennial 2006–2007 and took over as president for 2008–2009.

In addition to more than one hundred journal articles and book chapters, his authored books include:

- Of Saltimbanchi and Incendiari: Aldo Palazzeschi and Avant-Gardism in Italy (Fairleigh Dickinson UP, 1990);
- To Hyphenate or not to Hyphenate: the Italian/American Writer: Or, An "Other" American? (Guernica Editions, 1991);
- Per una lettura retrospettiva. Prose giovanili di Aldo Palazzeschi (Gradiva Publications, 1994);
- A Reconsideration of Aldo Palazzeschi’s Poetry (1905–1974): Revisiting the "Saltimbanco" (Mellen P, 1998);
- A Semiotic of Ethnicity: In (Re)cognition of the Italian/American Writer (SUNY P, 1998);
- A Semiotic of Re-reading: Italo Calvino’s "Snow Job" (Chancery P, 1999);
- Italian/American Short Films & Videos: A Semiotic Reading (Purdue UP, 2002);
- Semiotics of Re-reading: Guido Gozzano, Aldo Palazzeschi, and Italo Calvino (Fairleigh Dickinson UP, 2003), which also appeared in Italy as Una semiotica della ri-lettura: Guido Gozzano, Aldo Palazzeschi, e Italo Calvino (Franco Cesati Editore, 2003);
- Narrare altrove: diverse segnalature letterarie (Franco Cesati Editore, 2007);
- Una semiotica dell'etnicità: nuove segnalature per la letteratura italiano/americana (Franco Cesati Editore, 2010);
- Re-viewing Italian Americana: Generalities and Specificities on Cinema (Bordighera Press, 2011);
- Re-reading Italian Americana: Specificities and Generalities on Literature and Criticism (Fairleigh Dickinson UP, 2014/2015);
- Un biculturalismo negato: La letteratura “italiana” negli Stati Uniti (Franco Cesati Editore, 2018);
- Scrittori Italiano[-]Americani: trattino sì trattino no (MnM Print Edizioni, 2018);
- Signing Italian/American Cinema: A More Focused Look (Ovunque Siamo Press, 2021);
- The Columbus Affair. Imperatives for an Italian/American Agenda (Casa Lago Press, 2021).

Among his more than 30 co-edited volumes, with Paolo A. Giordano and Fred L. Gardaphé, Tamburri is contributing co-editor of the best-selling, historical volume From The Margin: Writings in Italian Americana (Purdue UP, 1991; 2nd edition, 2000) and co-founder of Bordighera Press, publisher of the semi-annual, Voices in Italian Americana, a literary and cultural review, the annual, Italiana, and two book series, Via Folios and Crossings, as well as The Bordighera Poetry Prize. Other edited volumes include, with Giordano, Beyond the Margin: Readings in Italian Americana (Fairleigh Dickinson UP, 1998); with Anna Camaiti Hostert, Screening Ethnicity: Cinematographic Representations of Italian Americans in the United States (Bordighera P2002), which also appeared in Italy as Scene italoamericane: la rappresentazione degli Italiani d’America (Sossella, 2002); with Joseph Sciorra et alii, Mediated Ethnicity. New Italian-American Cinema (Calandra Institute, 2010); with Graziella Parati, The Cultures of Italian Migration: Diverse Trajectories and Discrete Perspectives (Fairleigh Dickinson UP, 2011). He is also the director of two book series: Americana for Franco Cesati Editore (Florence, Italy), and Italian Studies for Fairleigh Dickinson University Press.
