= Helen Barolini =

American writer, editor, and translator (1925–2023)

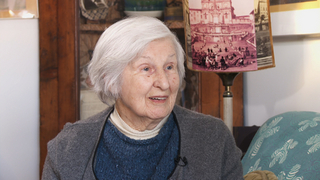
- Barolini in 2014
- Born: Helen Frances Mollica; November 18, 1925; Syracuse, New York, U.S.
- Died: March 29, 2023 (aged 97); Hastings-on-Hudson, New York, U.S.
- Education: Syracuse University; Columbia University
- Spouse: Antonio Barolini
- Children: 3 (including Teodolinda Barolini)

Helen Barolini (November 18, 1925 - March 29, 2023) was an American writer, editor, and translator.

== Early life and education ==
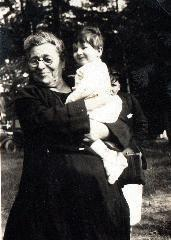
Helen Barolini with her grandmother, Nicoletta Cardamone, an immigrant from Castagna, Calabria, Italy

Helen Frances Mollica was born on November 18, 1925, in Syracuse, New York, to Italian-American parents. Her father, Anthony S. Mollica, was a fruit merchant whose family came from Spadafora, Sicily. Her mother, Angela Cardamone, was born in Utica, New York, to immigrants from Castagna, a small village in Calabria. Although both sets of grandparents were Italian immigrants, Barolini spoke no Italian as a child because her parents actively discouraged the use of the language at home. She later studied the language formally while attending Syracuse University, hiring a private tutor to help her learn Italian.

Barolini graduated magna cum laude from Syracuse University in 1947, received a diploma di profitto from the University of Florence in 1950, and earned a master's degree in library science from Columbia University in 1959.

== Career ==
After graduating from Syracuse, Barolini traveled to Italy, studying in Perugia and writing articles for the Syracuse Herald-Journal. It was there that she met and married the Italian writer, Antonio Barolini. The couple lived in Italy for several years before moving to New York. She translated several of her husband's works into English, including "Our Last Family Countess" (1960) and "A Long Madness" (1964).

Assisted by a grant from the National Endowment for the Arts, Barolini completed her first book in 1979: the novel Umbertina, for which she received the Americans of Italian Heritage award for literature in 1984 and the Premio Acerbi, an Italian literary prize, in 2008. The novel is named for a fictional character who emigrates to the U.S. from Calabria.

Her anthology, The Dream Book: An Anthology of Writings by Italian American Women (1985), received the American Book Award from the Before Columbus Foundation and the Susan Koppelman Award from the American Culture Association. It was praised by novelists Alice Walker and Cynthia Ozick, and hailed as a major work by critic Jules Chametzky. In an essay on Italian-American novelists, Fred Gardaphé writes, "Until The Dream Book appeared in 1985, Italian American women had not had the critics or literary historians who would attempt to probe their background, unlock the reasons of past silence, and acknowledge that they are finally present."

Barolini's essays have appeared in the New Yorker, Ms., the Yale Review, the Paris Review, the Kenyon Review, the Prairie Schooner, and other journals. Her essay collection, Chiaroscuro: Essays of Identity (1997), was named a Notable Work of American Literary Non-Fiction in The Best American Essays of the Century (2000), and her essay, "How I Learned to Speak Italian," originally published in the Southwest Review, was included in The Best American Essays 1998.

Barolini was an invited writer at Yaddo (1965) and the MacDowell Colony (1974); writer in residence at the Quarry Farm Center of Elmira College (1989); a Rockefeller Foundation resident scholar at Bellagio Center in Lake Como (1991); and visiting artist at the American Academy in Rome (2001). She has won numerous prizes and grants for her literary work. She also taught at Trinity College, Kirkland College, and Pace University; served as associate editor for the Westchester Illustrated; and worked as a librarian in Westchester, New York. In 1988 she was invited to speak at York University in Toronto by Joseph Pivato, the M.A. Elia Chair in Italian-Canadian Studies.

== Personal life ==
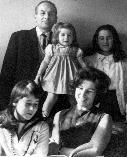
The Barolini family in the early 1960s: Antonio and Helen with their daughters Nicoletta (front left), Susanna (center), and Teodolinda (back right).

In 1950, she married Antonio Barolini. The couple had three daughters. Teodolinda Barolini became a professor of Italian at Columbia University; Susanna Barolini married an Italian artist from Urbino, and moved to Italy; and Nicoletta Barolini became an art director, also at Columbia. Antonio Barolini died in 1971.

Helen Barolini died in Hastings-on-Hudson, New York on March 29, 2023, at the age of 97.

== Bibliography ==
- Umbertina. (1979) New York: Feminist Press, 1999. ISBN 978-1-55861-205-1.
- The Dream Book: An Anthology of Writings by Italian-American Women. (1985) Rev. ed. Syracuse: Syracuse UP, 2000. ISBN 0-8156-0662-1.
- Love in the Middle Ages. New York: Morrow, 1986. ISBN 0-688-06387-X.
- Festa: Recipes and Recollections of Italian Holidays. Illustrations by Karen Barbour. San Diego: Harcourt Brace Jovanovich, 1988. ISBN 0-15-145771-9.
- Aldus and His Dream Book: An Illustrated Essay'. New York: Italica Press, 1992. ISBN 0-934977-22-4.
- Chiaroscuro: Essays of Identity. (1997) Rev. ed. Madison: U of Wisconsin P, 1999. ISBN 0-299-16084-X.
- More Italian Hours, and Other Stories. Boca Raton: Bordighera Press, 2001. ISBN 1-884419-48-8.
- Rome Burning. Delhi: Birch Brook Press, 2004. ISBN 0-913559-86-5.
- Their Other Side: Six American Women and the Lure of Italy. New York: Fordham UP, 2006. ISBN 978-0-8232-2629-0.
- A Circular Journey. New York: Fordham UP, 2006. ISBN 978-0-8232-2615-3.
- Crossing the Alps. (2010) Bordighera Press

== Awards ==
- 2009 - Hudson Valley Writers' Center Award
- 2008 - Premio Acerbi for Umbertina
- 2006 - William March Short Story Award at the Eugene Walter Writers Festival
- 2003 - Woman of the Year Award in Literature from the Italian Welfare League, New York
- 2003 - Sons of Italy Book Club Selection
- 2001 - Ars et Literas Award from the American Italian Cultural Roundtable
- 2000 - MELUS Award for Distinguished Contribution to Ethnic Studies
- 2000 - Chiaroscuro: Essays of Identity included in Houghton Mifflin's Notable Works of American Literary Non-Fiction in their publication Best American Essays of the Century
- 1987 - Susan Koppleman Award from the American Culture Association for The Dream Book
- 1986 - American Book Award of The Before Columbus Foundation for The Dream Book
- 1984 - Americans of Italian Heritage "Literature and the Arts Award" for Umbertina
- 1982 - American Committee on Italian Migration "Women in Literature" Award for Umbertina
- 1977 to 1979 - Member, The Writers Community, New York City
- 1976 - National Endowment for the Arts Grant in Creative Writing
- 1970 - Marina-Velca essay prize in Italy
