= Angel of Light (novel) =

1981 novel by Joyce Carol Oates

- First edition
- Author: Joyce Carol Oates
- Language: English
- Publisher: E. P. Dutton
- Publication date: 1981
- Publication place: United States
- Media type: Print (hardback)
- Pages: 434
- ISBN: 978-0525054832

Angel of Light is a novel by Joyce Carol Oates first published in 1981 by E. P. Dutton and reprinted by Warner Books in 1986.

The novel is an allegorical reimagining of the ancient Greek myth concerning the House of Atreus, dramatized by Aeschylus in his Oresteia.

The title of the novel is an explicit reference to the sobriquet that author Henry David Thoreau conferred on abolitionist John Brown

== Plot ==
Angel of Light is told from a first-person point-of-view by Nick Martens. The story is set in Washington, D. C. in 1980.

The story explores the aftermath of the death of Maurice "Maurie" Halleck, a justice commissioner, in an automobile accident. His children, Owen and Kirsten, believe that his death was not a suicide, but rather a homicide arranged by their mother, Isabel. In a revenge pact, they murder Isabel and attempt to kill her lover, Nick Martens.

== Reception ==
Reviewer Thomas R. Edwards in the New York Times acknowledges the ancient Greek antecedents for the novel adding, "But here the myth is updated, and altered, by the terms in which power is now exercised in America..." Edwards adds this praise: "Miss Oates achieves a fresh and frightening picture of a desire that exceeds any available attainment."

== Retrospective appraisal ==
Angel of Light is thematically representative of Oates's novels of the late 1970s and early 1980s, concerning "the hunger to transcend human limitations through the redemptive powers of love." Though Oates frames the story with an allusion to Aeschylus's tragedy, literary critic Joanne V. Creighton finds that the author fails to render her contemporary portrayals of Orestes and Electra convincingly. Creighton offers the following composite passage - a profile of Kirsten/Electra - as evidence of Oates's tendency to confront readers with "too much unassimilated information.":

An introvert, a loner, passive-aggressive, bright, quick, inventive, unsocial, remarkable facility for language, troublemaker, ringleader, sarcastic, naturally good-humored, witty, funny, comedian, clown, in fact voted class clown at Hays, her second and final year at that prestigious school, depressive personality, manic interludes, prone to fantasizing, high I.Q., wide range of interests, unusual maturity, sympathy for overseas orphans, project on Vietnamese children, project on John Brown, perfectionist, impatient, immature, sloppy work habits, inability to listen to authority, unfunny in fact potentially dangerous sense of humor...Insomniac, anorexic, gay and chattering nonstop, mute for days, not showering, not changing clothes, rude to her roommate, weeping in her roommates arms, sending Owen that repulsive message...the small white grim insufferable face, Starving herself. Fainting in gym class and on the stairs. Silent in class, her arms folded right across her breasts. Staring. Smirking. Faint lines on her forehead. An odor of inconsolable grief, stale as unwashed clothes. Alone and stubborn and light-headed.

== Theme ==
In addition to the "implicit parallel" to the Greek drama Oresteia (5th century BCE), Oates draws a thematic element from Henry David Thoreau's spirited defense of abolitionist John Brown in 1859.

The novel's title is based on Thoreau's characterization of Brown as "an angel of light" who sacrificed his life in the name of righteous justice. Creighton writes: "Oates picks up a dominant strain in American character and history. Maurice Halleck is a modern-day angel of light, with affinities to John Brown and Thoreau."

== Sources ==
- Creighton, Joanne V. 1979. Joyce Carol Oates: Novels of the Middle Years. Twayne Publishers, New York. Warren G. French, editor. ISBN 0805776478
- Edwards, Thomas R. 1981. "The House of Atreus Now." New York Times, August 16, 1981. https://archive.nytimes.com/www.nytimes.com/books/98/07/05/specials/oates-angel.html Accessed 31 January 2025.
- Johnson, Greg. 1987. Understanding Joyce Carol Oates. University of South Carolina Press, Columbia, South Carolina. ISBN 0-87249-524-8
- Oates, Joyce Carol. 1981. Angel of Light, E. P. Dutton, New York. ISBN 978-0525054832
