= Daniela Gioseffi =

American writer

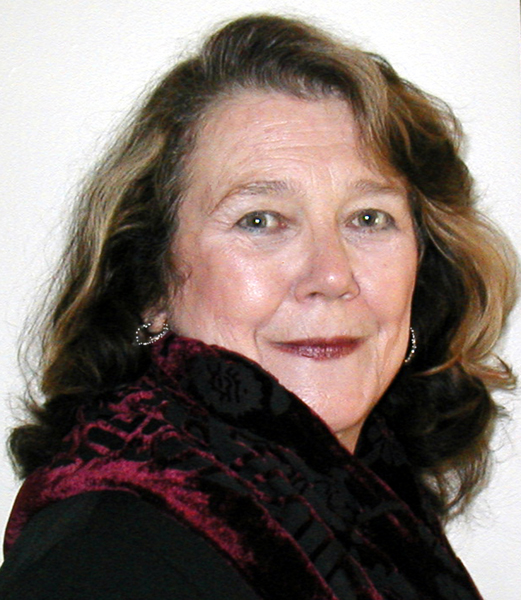
- Gioseffi in 2006
- Born: 1941 (age 84–85); Orange, New Jersey, U.S.
- Education: Passaic Valley Regional High School; Montclair State University (BA); Catholic University of America (MFA)
- Occupations: Poet; novelist; performer
- Writing career
- Notable awards: American Book Award (1990)

Daniela Gioseffi (born 1941) is an American poet, novelist and performer who won the American Book Award in 1990 for Women on War; International Writings from Antiquity to the Present (Touchstone/Simon & Schuster, 1988). She has published 16 books of poetry and prose and won a PEN American Center's Short Fiction prize (1995), and The John Ciardi Award for Lifetime Achievement in Poetry (2007).

== Early life ==
Gioseffi was born in 1941 in Orange, New Jersey, the daughter of an Italian-Albanian immigrant father, Daniel Donato Gioseffi, one of the first Italian immigrants to win a Phi Beta Kappa in the United States from the alpha chapter of Union College in Schenectady. Her mother was a war orphan of Polish and Russian Jewish descent who worked as a seamstress and dress designer. Because of her mother's orphan status, and her father's large Italian family, Gioseffi grew up with a strong imprint of Italian American culture. She grew up in Newark and attended Avon Avenue Public School, later moving to Little Falls, New Jersey, where she attended Passaic Valley Regional High School and served as valedictorian of her graduating class of 1959.

Gioseffi attended Montclair University, majoring in English Literature and Speech and Theatre, graduating in 1963. While at Montclair University, she began publishing poetry in the campus literary magazine. She won a scholarship to study World Drama at the well known Speech and Theatre Department of The Graduate School of Arts and Sciences at CUA, Washington, D.C. Her first novel with Doubleday, Dell, and New English Library, was the feminist comedy The Great American Belly Dance.

== Career ==
Gioseffi began her career as a civil rights worker and journalist for WSLA-TV in Selma, Alabama in 1961. Gioseffi graduated from Montclair State University in New Jersey with a Bachelor of Arts Degree in English in 1963. She was awarded a scholarship to The Catholic University of America by The National Players, where she completed a Master of Fine Arts in World Drama in 1977. While there she performed with Helen Hayes at the Hartke Theatre and with Anne Revere at Olney Theatre, in Brecht's Mother Courage. Gioseffi toured in Hamlet and Twelfth Night with The National Players Classical Repertory Theatre for a year.

Whilst with the National Players, Gioseffi met her future husband Richard Kearney. He served as technical director for that tour and then as assistant technical director at The Arena State, D.C. The couple had a daughter, singer songwriter, Thea D. Kearney, and moved to New York City, where Richard became technical director and designer at the George Gershwin Theatre, Brooklyn College.

Gioseffi won an award from The New York State Council for the Arts, for her feminist poem-plays Care of the Body and The Sea Hag in the Cave of Sleep, in 1971 produced Off Broadway in New York City. With a second award from the Council she published her first book of poetry, Eggs in the Lake, published by BOA (1977). Subsequently, Gioseffi edited On Prejudice; A Global Perspective (Anchor/Doubleday: NY, 1993), which was awarded a Plougshares Peace Foundation grant as was her later anthology Women on War.

Women on War; International Writings from Antiquity to the Present (Touchstone/Simon & Schuster, 1988) won the American Book Award in 1990 and was reissued in an updated edition during the Iraq War (2003), in-print for over 25 years.

Gioseffi has lived the rest of her writing life in Brooklyn Heights, New York City, where she created the First Brooklyn Bridge Poetry Walk – now produced by Poets House every year as a spring fund raiser.

Gioseffi published four more collections of poetry, two novels, and a volume of short fiction, including Blood Autumn: Autunno di sangue, a bilingual edition of new and selected poems. Before retiring from teaching Gioseffi taught at Brooklyn College, Pace University, New York University's Publishing Institute, and The Manhattan's College of Visual Arts, and received a Lifetime Achievement Award in Education from The Association of Italian American Educators in 2003. Gioseffi is the editor of Eco-Poetry.org and PoetsUSA.com.

In the early 1990s, she moved to Byram Township, New Jersey.

== Legacy ==
Gioseffi's books, papers and correspondence are now housed as The Daniela Gioseffi Papers at the Beinecke Library of Books and Manuscripts at Yale University Library and can be seen online. Her work is etched in marble on a wall of the 7th Avenue Concourse of New York City's Pennsylvania Station, with verses by Walt Whitman and William Carlos Williams among other poets.

== Published & produced works ==
- Care of the Body, and The Sea Hag in the Cave of Sleep, 1971
- The Sea Hag in the Cave of Sleep
- The Brooklyn Bridge Poetry Walk, 1971
- The Great American Belly..., 1977 (Doubleday: NY, New English Library, London.)
- Eggs in the Lake; Poems, 1977 (Boa Editions; Rochester, NY.)
- Earth Dancing; Mother Nature’s Oldest Rite, non-fiction treatise 1980 (Stackpole Books, PA.)
- Women on War: International Writings for the Nuclear Age, ed., 1988 (Touchstone/Simon & Schuster: NY.)
- Guide to Northwest Jersey Wildlife: Flora and Fauna, 1994,(Skylands Association, NJ.)
- Word Wounds and Water Flowers; Poems, (Bordighera Press, Purdue University, 1995.)
- In Bed with the Exotic Enemy: Stories & Novella, 1995 (Avisson Bks., Greensboro: NC.)
- Going On, Poems, 2000 (Rattapallax Press: New York, NY)
- Women on War: International Writings from Antiquity to the Present, 2003, (Feminist Press, Graduate Center of the City University of New York.)
- Blood Autumn: Autunno di sangue, New & Selected Poems, 2006 (VIA Folios, Bordighera Press, John D. Calandra Institute, Graduate Center, City University of New York.)
- Emily Dickinson: Lover of Science and Scientist in Dark Days of the Republic, essay, Chelsea Literary Review, Number 81, New York City.
- Wild Nights, Wild Nights: The Story of Emily Dickinson's Master Figure: "Neighbor and Friend and Bridegroom," A Biographical Novel, 2010, Plain View Press
- Pioneering Italian American Culture: Escaping la vita della cucina, VIA Folios, Essays & Interviews by & about Daniela Gioseffi, edited with an Introduction by Angelina Oberdan. 2013 Bordighera Press: Calandra Inst. Queens College City U. NY.
- Author and Activist: The Daniela Gioseffi Story, A Biographical Documentary, Produced & Directed by Anton Evangelista
