= Charles Alexander (poet) =

American poet, book artist and publisher

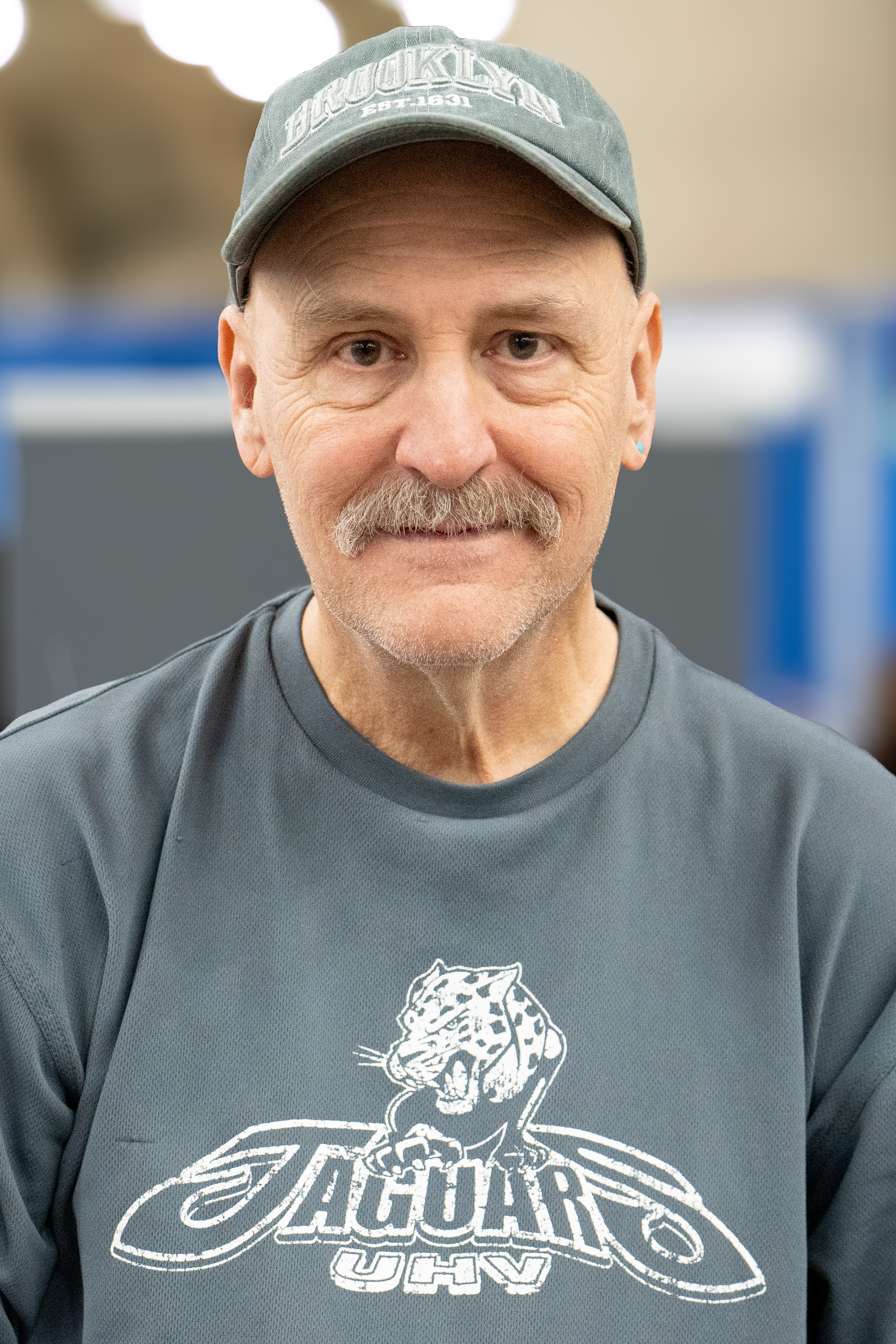
Alexander at 2026 AWP

Charles Alexander (born 1954) is an American poet, publisher, and book artist. He is the director and editor-in-chief of Chax Press. Alexander also served as the director of the Minnesota Center for the Book Arts from 1993 until 1995, and as book artist there through 1996. Alexander lives in Tucson, Arizona with his wife the visual artist Cynthia Miller and his two daughters. In 2006, he received the Arizona Arts Award and in 2021, he received the Lord Nose Award for excellence in independent literary publishing.

== Life and career ==
Alexander learned bookmaking techniques studying with Walter Hamady at the University of Wisconsin Department of Fine Arts in Madison, Wisconsin during the late seventies and early eighties.

=== Publications ===
Alexander's books of poetry include Hopeful Buildings (Chax Press, 1990), arc of light | dark matter (Segue Books, 1992), Pushing Water: parts one through six (Standing Stones Press, Morris, MN, 1998), Pushing Water: part seven (Chax Press, Tucson), Four Ninety Eight to Seven (Meow Press, 1996), Etudes: D & D (Quarry Press, 1997), near or random acts (Singing Horse Press, 2004), and Certain Slants (Junction Press, 2007). He is also the editor of Talking the Boundless Book. Since 1997 he has been working on a long serial poem entitled Pushing Water which is still in process.

=== Teaching and performance ===
Alexander has collaborated in a poem/visual art mark commissioned by the Phoenix Public Library, created with his wife, Cynthia Miller, as well as several projects with Orts Theater of Dance, including Urban Gaits and Balanced Edge. His poem, Aviary Corridor, set to music for string quartet, piano, flute, and soprano voice by the American composer Tim Risher, premiered at the University of Washington in April 2007, with Alexander as writer/artist in residence. He read for the Double Change series in Paris in June 2007.

Alexander is a part-time faculty member at Naropa University's Jack Kerouac School of Disembodied Poetics in Boulder, Colorado, Pima Community College, and the University of Arizona.

== Chax Press ==
Chax Press is a publisher of experimental and avant-garde poetry run by Alexander. The press publishes trade paperback and handmade fine arts editions. The press was established in Tucson, Arizona in 1984, continuing the work of Black Mesa Press that Alexander had begun in 1981 in Wisconsin. The first book published was French Sonnets, by Jackson Mac Low. Chax Press continues to publish about 10 titles a year. Chax Press is funded by grants from organizations such as the Tucson-Pima Arts Council and the National Endowment for the Arts, the Fund for Poetry, by its income from book sales and by donations from individuals.
