= Joseph Tusiani =

Italian American poet (1924–2020)

- Born: January 14, 1924; Apulia, Italy
- Died: April 11, 2020 (aged 96)

Joseph Tusiani (January 14, 1924 – April 11, 2020) was an Italian-American poet, translator, and novelist. He served as a professor emeritus of languages and literature at Lehman College and was named New York State Poet Laureate Emeritus in 2016 by Governor Andrew Cuomo. Tusiani published works in four languages: Italian, Latin, English, and Gargano, the dialect of his birthplace in the Apulia region of Italy.

== Early life and education ==
Born in the Apulia region of Italy, Tusiani earned his Ph.D. in Letters from the University of Naples in 1947. He emigrated to the United States the following year, settling in the Arthur Avenue neighborhood of the Bronx. He began his teaching career at the College of Mount Saint Vincent before joining Lehman College.

== Career ==
In addition to teaching, Tusiani was a prolific writer and translator. His works include poetry, translations, a novel, and a three-volume autobiography. His contributions to literature and education were recognized internationally, earning him several prestigious awards.

== Achievements and recognition ==
In 1954, he was the first American to receive the Greenwood Prize of the Poetry Society of England. He received the AATI Distinguished Service Award in 1986, and the Keys to the City of Florence in 2007 for his contributions to literature.

A scholarship was established in his name at Lehman College to support students interested in Italian-American culture.
