= Josephine Gattuso Hendin =

Italian-American novelist (born 1944)

- Born: 1944 (age 81–82)
- Education: City College of New York; Columbia University (MA, PhD)
- Occupations: Novelist; critic
- Awards: American Book Award (1989)

Josephine Gattuso Hendin (born 1944) is an Italian-American feminist novelist and critic.

== Life ==
She grew up in Queens and now lives in Manhattan.

She graduated from City College of New York, magna cum laude, and Columbia University with an M.A. in 1965, and Ph.D. in 1968. She taught at Yale University, and City College of New York. She teaches at New York University.

== Awards ==
- 1975 Guggenheim Fellow
- 1989 American Book Award for The Right Thing to Do

== Works ==
- Heartbreakers: Women and Violence in Contemporary Culture and Literature. Palgrave Macmillan. January 3, 2004. ISBN 978-0-312-23700-4.
- The Right Thing to Do. Boston: D. R. Godine. 1988. ISBN 978-1-55861-220-4. (reprint The Feminist Press, 1999)
- Vulnerable People: A View of American Fiction Since 1945. New York: Oxford University Press. 1978. ISBN 978-0-19-502319-0.
- The World of Flannery O'Connor. Bloomington: Indiana University Press. 1970. ISBN 978-0-608-13725-4.

=== Anthologies ===
- Regina Barreca, ed. (2002). Don't tell mama!: the Penguin book of Italian American writing. Penguin Books. ISBN 978-0-14-200247-6.
- Mary Ann Vigilante Mannino; Justin Vitiello, eds. (2003). Breaking open: reflections on Italian American women's writing. Purdue University Press. ISBN 978-1-55753-243-5.
