= Mario Perniola =

Italian philosopher (1941–2018)

Mario Perniola (20 May 1941 – 9 January 2018) was an Italian philosopher, professor of aesthetics and author. Many of his works have been published in English.

== Biography ==
Mario Perniola was born in Asti, Piedmont. He studied philosophy under Luigi Pareyson at the University of Turin where he graduated in 1965. While he was reading philosophy in Turin, he met Gianni Vattimo and Umberto Eco, who all became prominent scholars of Pareyson's school. From 1966 to 1969 he was connected to the avant-garde Situationist International movement founded by Guy Debord with whom he kept on friendly terms for several years. He became a full professor of aesthetics at the University of Salerno in 1976 and then he moved to the University of Rome Tor Vergata, where he has been teaching since 1983. He was visiting professor invited to universities and research centres, such as Stanford University (United States), l’Ecole des Hautes Etudes en Sciences Sociales (Paris), University of Alberta (Canada), University of Kyoto (Japan), University of São Paulo (Brazil), University of Sydney, University of Melbourne (Australia), and the National University of Singapore. Perniola wrote many books which have been translated into English and other languages. He also directed the journals Agaragar (1971–73), Clinamen (1988–92), Estetica News (1988–95). In 2000 he founded Agalma. Rivista di Studi Culturali e di Estetica, a journal of cultural studies and aesthetics, which is published twice a year. The breadth, insight and many-faced contributions of Perniola's thought has earned him the reputation of being one of the most impressive figures on the contemporary philosophical scene. His book Miracoli e traumi della comunicazione (2009) (Miracles and Traumas of Communication) gained many awards amongst which the prestigious Premio De Sanctis. His wide-ranging activities involved formulating innovative philosophical theories, writing books, teaching aesthetics, and lecturing worldwide. He dedicated the rest of his time to his kindred and numerous friends, passing between his apartment-studio in Rome and his vacation home in a quaint town in the Alban Hills, southeast of Rome, where he died.

== Philosophy of literature ==
The initial period of Perniola's career focuses on the philosophy of the novel and the theory of literature. In his first main work, Il metaromanzo (The Metanovel 1966), which is his doctoral dissertation, Perniola argues that the modern novel from Henry James to Samuel Beckett has a self-referential character. Furthermore, he claims that the novel is only about itself. Perniola's aim was to demonstrate the philosophical dignity of these literary works and try to recover a serious cultural expression. The Italian Nobel Prize winner for Literature, Eugenio Montale, praised Perniola for this original critique of novels.

== Counter-culture ==
Perniola, however, does not only have an academic soul but also an anti-academic one. The latter is epitomized by his attention to alternative and transgressive cultural expressions. His first major work belonging to this anti-academic side is L'alienazione artistica (Artistic Alienation 1971), in which he draws on Marxist thought that inspired him at that time. Perniola argues that alienation is not a failure of art, but rather a condition of the very existence of art as a distinctive category of human activity. His second book I situazionisti (The situationists 1972; republished with the same title by Castelvecchi, Rome, 1998) exemplified his interest in the avant-garde and the work of Guy Debord. Perniola gives an account of the Situationist International and post-situationist movement which lasted from 1957 to 1971 and in which he was personally involved from 1966 to 1969. He also highlights the conflicting features which characterized the members of the movement. The journal Agaragar (published between 1971 and 1972) continues the post-situationist critique of capitalist and bourgeoisie society. Perniola then published his book on the French writer George Bataille (George Bataille e il negativo, Milan: Feltrinelli, 1977; George Bataille and the Negative). The negative here is conceived as the motor of history.

== Post-structuralism ==
In the 1980s Perniola offered some of his most insightful contributions to continental philosophy. In Dopo Heidegger. Filosofia e organizzazione della cultura (After Heidegger. Philosophy and Organization of Culture 1982), drawing on Martin Heidegger and Antonio Gramsci, Perniola includes a theoretical discourse on social organization. He in fact argues the possibility of establishing a novel relationship between culture and society in Western civilization. As the former interrelations between metaphysics and church, dialectics and state, science and profession have been deconstructed, philosophy and culture provide a way to overcome nihilism and populism which characterize today's society. Ritual Thinking. Sexuality, Death, World (2001) is a composite volume in English containing sections of two works published in Italian in the 1980s, i.e. La società dei simulacri (The Society of Simulacra 1980) and Transiti. Come si va dallo stesso allo stesso (Transits. How to go from the Same to the Same 1985). Perniola's theory of simulacra deals with the logic of seduction which was also pursued by Jean Baudrillard. Although seduction is empty, it is nevertheless rooted in a concrete historical context. Simulation, however, provides images which are valued as such regardless of what they actually represent or refer to. "Images are simulations in that they seduce and yet out of their emptiness, they have effects". Perniola then illustrates the role of such images in a wide range of cultural, aesthetic and social contexts. The notion of transit seems to be more suitable to capture the cultural aspects of technology which have altered today's society. Transit – i.e. going from the same to the same – avoids falling into the opposition of dialectics "that would precipitate thinking in the mystification of metaphysics".

== Posthuman ==
In the 1990s Perniola included new territories in his philosophical inquiry. In Del sentire (On feeling 1991) the author investigates novel ways of feeling which have nothing to do with previous ones that characterized modern aesthetics from the 17th through the 20th centuries. Perniola claims that sensology has taken over since the beginning of the 1960s. This requires an impersonal emotional universe, characterized by anonymous experience, in which everything renders itself as already felt. The only alternative is to turn back to the classical world and, in particular, to ancient Greece. In the volume Il sex appeal dell'inorganico (The Sex Appeal of the Inorganic 1994; English edition, 2004), Perniola brings together philosophy and sexuality. Contemporary sensibility has transformed the relations between things and humans. Sex extends beyond the act and the body. An organic type of sexuality is being replaced by a neutral, inorganic and artificial sexuality indifferent to beauty, age or form. Perniola's work explores the role of eros, desire, and sexuality in today's experience of the aesthetic and the impact of technology. His is a train of thought which opens up new perspectives on our contemporary reality. The most surprising feature is Perniola's ability to combine a rigorous re-interpretation of the philosophical tradition with a meditation on the "sexy". He addresses uncanny aspects such as sexual intercourse without orgasm, climax or any release of tensions. He deals with orifices and organs, and forms of self-abandonments which go against a mutual pattern of reciprocity. However, drawing on the Kantian tradition, Perniola also argues that spouses are things, because "in wedlock, each entrusts his/her entire person to the other in order to acquire full rights on the whole person of the other". In L'arte e la sua ombra (Art and Its Shadow, London-New York, Continuum, 2004), Perniola proposes an alternative interpretation of the shadow which has had a long history in philosophy. In the analysis of contemporary art and film, Perniola explores how art continues to survive in spite of the world of mass communication and reproduction. He maintains that the meaning of art is to be found in the shadow created which has been left out by the art establishment, mass communication, market and mass media.

== Aesthetics ==
Perniola's work also covers the history of aesthetics and aesthetic theory. In 1990 he published Enigmi. Il momento egizio nella società e nell'arte, (Enigmas. The Egyptian Moment in Society and Art, London-New York, Verso, 1995), in which he analyzes other forms of sensibility that take place between man and things. Perniola argues that our society is living through an "Egyptian moment", marked by a process of reification. As products of high technology increasingly assume organic properties, humanity turns into a thing, in the sense that it deliberately sees itself as an object. The volume L'estetica del Novecento (Twentieth-Century Aesthetics 1997) provides an original account and critique to the main aesthetic theories that characterized the previous century. He traces six main trends which are the aesthetics of life, form, knowledge, action, feeling and culture. In Del sentire cattolico. La forma culturale di una religione universale (On Catholic Feeling. The Cultural Form of a Universal Religion 2001), Perniola emphasizes the cultural identity of Catholicism rather than its moralistic and dogmatic one. He proposes "Catholicism without orthodoxy" and "a faith without dogma", which enables Catholicism to be perceived as a universal sense of cultural feeling. The work Strategie del bello. Quarant’anni di estetica italiana (1968-2008) (Strategies of Beauty. Forty Years of Italian Aesthetics (1968-2008) 2009) analyzes the main aesthetic theories which portray the transformations taken place in Italy since the 1960s onwards. Perniola's volume highlights the relationship between the historical, political, and anthropological traits rooted in Italian society and the critical discourse arising around them. Furthermore, he argues that knowledge and culture should continue to be granted a privileged position in our societies, and they should challenge the arrogance of the establishments, the insolence of the publishers, the vulgarity of mass media, and the plutocratic roguery.

== Philosophy of media ==
Perniola's wide range of theoretical interests include philosophy of media. In Contro la comunicazione (Against Communication 2004) he analyzes the origins, mechanisms, and dynamics of mass-media communication and its degenerating effects. The volume Miracoli e traumi della comunicazione (Miracles and Traumas of Communication 2009) deals with the uncanny effects of communication since the 1960s focusing on four "generative events". These are the students' revolts in 1968, the Iranian revolution in 1979, the fall of the Berlin Wall in 1989, and the 9/11 World Trade Center attack. Each of these episodes are all dealt with against the backdrop of the miraculous and traumatic effects in which mass-media communication has blurred the differences between the real and impossible, high culture and mass culture, the decline of professions, the success of populism, the role of addictions, the repercussions of the internet on today's culture and society, and, last but not least, the role of evaluation in which porn stars seem to have reached the highest ranks in the who's who charts.

== Fiction ==
Perniola is the author of the novel Tiresia (1968), which is inspired by the ancient Greek myth of the prophet Tiresias, who was transformed into a woman. His last book of fiction is Del terrorismo come una delle belle arti (On Terrorism as one of Fine Arts, 2016).

== Selected works in Italian ==
- Il metaromanzo, Milano, Silva, 1966.
- Tiresia, Milano, Silva, 1968.
- L'alienazione artistica, Milano, Mursia, 1971.
- Bataille e il negativo, Milano, Feltrinelli, 1977. Nuova edizione, Philosophia sexualis. Scritti Georges Bataille, Verona, Ombre Corte, 1998. ISBN 88-87009-08-2.
- La società dei simulacri, Bologna, Cappelli, 1980.
- Dopo Heidegger. Filosofia e organizzazione della cultura, Milano, Feltrinelli, 1982.
- Transiti. Come si va dallo stesso allo stesso, Bologna, Cappelli, 1985, introduzione alla 2^ edizione a cura dell'autore, 1989.
- Presa diretta. Estetica e politica. Venezia, Cluva, 1986. ISBN 88-85067-25-5.
- Enigmi. Il momento egizio nella società e nell'arte, Genova, Costa & Nolan, 1990. ISBN 88-7648-109-5.
- Del sentire, Torino, Einaudi, 1991, 2002. ISBN 88-06-16254-3.
- Più che sacro, più che profano, Milano, Mimesis, 1992. ISBN 88-85889-34-4..
- Il sex appeal dell'inorganico, Torino, Einaudi 1994, ISBN 88-06-16996-3
- L'estetica del Novecento, Bologna, Il Mulino, 1997. ISBN 88-15-06028-6.
- Disgusti. Nuove tendenze estetiche, Milano, Costa & Nolan, 1999. ISBN 88-7648-321-7.
- I situazionisti, Roma, Castelvecchi, 1998, 2005. ISBN 88-7615-068-4.
- L'arte e la sua ombra, Torino, Einaudi, 2000, 2004. ISBN 88-06-14737-4.
- Del sentire cattolico. La forma culturale di una religione universale, Bologna, Il Mulino, 2001. ISBN 88-15-08205-0.
- Contro la comunicazione, Torino, Einaudi, 2004. ISBN 88-06-16820-7.
- Miracoli e traumi della comunicazione, Torino, Einaudi, 2009. ISBN 978-88-06-18826-9
- "Strategie del bello. Quarant'anni di estetica italiana (1968-2008)", Ágalma. Rivista di studi culturali e di estetica, n. 18, numero monografico a tiratura limitata. ISBN 978-88-8483-980-0 ISSN 1723-0284
- Strategie del bello. Quarant'anni di estetica italiana (1968-2008), Milano, Mimesis 2010, ISBN 978-88-8483-980-0
- Estetica contemporanea. Una visione globale, Bologna, 2011. ISBN 978-88-15-14938-1
- La società dei simulacri Nuova edizione, Milano, Mimesis, 2011, ISBN 978-88-575-0496-4
- Berlusconi o il '68 realizzato, Milano, Mimesis, 2011. ISBN 978-88-5750-748-4
- Presa diretta. Estetica e politica. Nuova edizione, Milano, Mimesis, 2012. ISBN 978-88-5751-191-7
- Da Berlusconi a Monti. Disaccordi imperfetti, Milano, Mimesis, 2013. ISBN 978-88-575-1293-8.
- L'avventura situazionista. Storia critica dell'ultima avanguardia del XX secolo, Milano, Mimesis, 2013. ISBN 978-88-5751-716-2
- L'arte espansa, Torino, Einaudi, 2015. ISBN 9788806226510.
- Del terrorismo come una delle belle arti, Milano, Mimesis, 2016. ISBN 9788857532202
- Estetica italiana contemporanea, Milano, Bompiani, 2017, ISBN 978-88-452-8404-5.
- Tiresia contro Edipo. Vite di un intellettuale disorganico (a cura di Enea Bianchi), Genova, Il Melangolo, 2021.

== Selected works in English ==
=== Books ===
- Enigmas. The Egyptian Moment in Society and Art, translated by Christopher Woodall, preface to the English Edition by the author, London-New York, Verso, 1995, ISBN 1-85984-061-2.
- Ritual Thinking. Sexuality, Death, World, foreword by Hugh J. Silverman, introduction and translation by Massimo Verdicchio, with the author's introduction, Amherst (USA), Humanity Books, 2000, ISBN 1-57392-869-0.
- Art and Its Shadow, foreword by Hugh J.Silverman, translated by Massimo Verdicchio, London-New York, Continuum, 2004, ISBN 0-8264-6243-X.
- The Sex-appeal of the Inorganic, translated by Massimo Verdicchio, London-New York, Continuum, 2004, ISBN 0-8264-6245-6.
- 20th Century Aesthetics: Towards a Theory of Feeling, translated by Massimo Verdicchio, London-New Delhi- New York- Sydney, Bloomsbury, 2013. ISBN 978-1-4411-1850-9

=== Articles ===
- “Time and time again”, Artforum, (April) 1983.
- “The difference of the Italian Philosophical Culture”, Graduate Faculty Philosophy Journal, New School for Social Research, New York, 1984.
- “Logic of Seduction”, NMA, n 3, MAGAZINE, 1984.
- “Mimetic Art”, Krisis, (Houston), 1985, n. 3–4.
- “Post-political Styles”, Differentia, 1986, Autumn.
- “Venusian Charme”, “Decorum and Ceremony”. Giovanna Borradori, ed., Recoding Metaphysics. The New Italian Philosophy, Evanston: Northwestern University Press, 1988.
- “Between Clothing and Nudità”, Zone, 1989, n. 4.
- “Beyond Postmodernity”, Differentia, 1989, Spring-Autumn.
- “Beauty is like a Lightning Bolt”, Walter De Maria, Stockholm, Moderna Museet, 1989.
- “Critical Reflections”, Artforum, 1991, Summer.
- “Enigmas of Italian Temperament”, Differentia, 1991, n. 5.
- “Primordial Graffiti”, Differentia, 1991, n. 5.
- “Urban, more than urban”, Topographie, Wien, 1991, and in Strata, Helsinki, 1992.
- “Excitement”, Frederikborgmuseet, 1994.
- “Rituals in Exhibition”, Haim Steinbach. Catalog edited by the Galleria d'Arte del Castello di Rivoli, Milano, Charta, 1995.
- “Towards Visual Philosophy”, The 6th International Video Week, Genève 1995.
- “Burri and Aesthetics”, Burri, Milano, Electa 1996.
- “Style, narrative and post-history” (with Arthur Danto and Demetrio Paparoni), Tema celeste, May–June, 1997.
- “Sex appeal of the Inorganic”, (with Contardi), Journal of European Psychoanalysis, n. 3–4, (Spring 1996-Winter 1997).
- “An Aesthetic of the Grand Style: Guy Debord”, Substance, 1999, n.90.
- “Cultural Turns in Art. Art between parasitism and admiration”, RES, 41, Spring, 2002.
- “Feeling the Difference”, James Swearingen, Johanne Cutting-Gray, ed., Feeling the Difference, Extreme Beauty. Esthetics, Politics, Death. New York-London, Continuum, 2002.
- “The Cultural Turn and Ritual Feeling in Catholicism”, Paragrana, Berlin, 2003, n.1-2. Republished as “The Cultural Turn in Catholicism”, The Dialogue. Yearbook of Philosophical Hermeneutics, Reason and Reasonabless (Riccardo Dottori ed.), Münster, Lit Verlag, 2005. Published also in Henning Laugerud & Laura Katrine Skinnebach, eds., Instruments of devotion. The Practices and objects of Religious Piety from the Late Middle Ages to the 20th Century, Aarhus University Press, 2007, pp. 45–60 ISBN 978-87-7934-200-2.
- “Remembering Derrida”, Substance, (Univ. of California), 2005, n. 1, issue 106, pp. 48–49.
- “The Japanese juxtaposition”, European Review, 2006, vol. 14, no.1, pp. 129–34.
- “New York. Vamp City”, Celant, G., & Dennison, L., (eds.), New York, New York. Fifty Years of Art, Architecture, Cinema, Performance, Photography and Video, Milan, Skira, 2006.
- “Cultural Turns in Aesthetics and Anti-Aesthetics”, Filozofski vestnik (ed. Aleš Erjacev), vol. XXVIII, Number 2, 2007, pp. 39–51.
- “Becoming Deleuzian”, Deleuze and Guattari Studies, 13.4, 2019, pp. 482–494.

== See also ==
- Aesthetics
- Anti-art
- Situationist International
- Simulacrum
- Cyberpunk
- Clothing fetish
- Italian philosophy
- Philosophy of sex
- Western philosophy
