= Fred Gardaphé =

American literary scholar

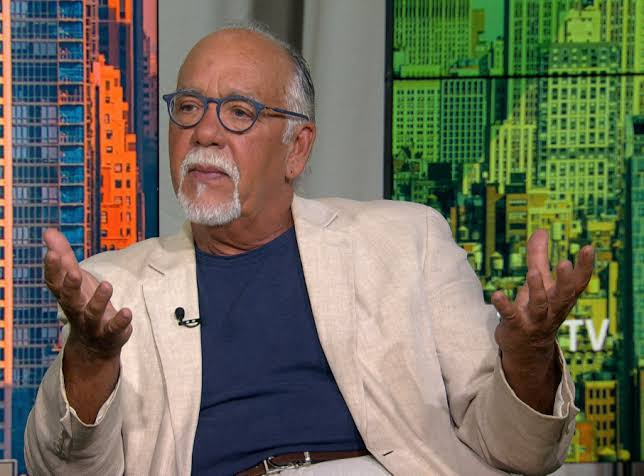
- Gardaphé on the CUNY TV program Italics
- Born: 1950 (age 75–76); Melrose Park, Illinois, U.S.
- Education: University of Illinois Chicago; University of Chicago; University of Wisconsin–Madison
- Occupations: Historian, novelist, professor

Fred Gardaphé is an American literary scholar, currently a Distinguished Professor of Italian and American Studies at Queens College, City University of New York and the John D. Calandra Italian American Institute.

Born in the Melrose Park, Illinois in an Italian American family, Gardaphé attended junior college before completing his undergraduate education at the University of Wisconsin-Madison in 1976 and continuing a career in academia. He received his masters at the University of Chicago and completed his PhD thesis at the University of Illinois-Chicago.
