= List of Italian-American women writers =

The following is a list of Italian-American women writers.

== A–C ==
- Kim Addonizio
- Carol Bonomo Albright
- Susanne Antonetta
- Penny Arcade
- Romina Arena
- Dodici Azpadu
- Cheryl B
- Helen Barolini
- Gina Barreca
- Dorothy Barresi
- Gloria Vitanza Basile
- Marion Benasutti
- Adria Bernardi
- Lucia Chiavola Birnbaum
- Mary Jo Bona
- Dorothy Bryant
- Mary Bucci Bush
- Louisa Calio
- Mary Cappello
- Mary Caponegro
- Nancy Carnevale
- Mary Beth Caschetta
- Grace Cavalieri
- Diana Cavallo
- Rita Ciresi
- Maryann Zillotti Corbett
- Paola Corso

== D–J ==
- Tina DeRosa
- Louise DeSalvo
- Rachel Guido deVries
- Diane DiPrima
- Grace DiSanto
- Beverly D'Onofrio
- Ree Dragonette
- Jean Feraca
- Sandra Mortola Gilbert
- Maria Mazziotti Gillan
- Daniela Gioseffi
- Edvige Giunta
- Mary Gordon
- Rose Basile Green
- Rose Grieco
- Jennifer Guglielmo
- Barbara Grizzuti Harrison
- Josephine Gattuso Hendin
- Joanna Clapps Herman
- Ann Hood

== K–M ==
- Victoria Lancelotta
- Annie Lanzillotto
- Maria Laurino
- Donna Leon
- LindaAnn Loschiavo
- Anne Marie Macari
- Karen Malpede
- Donna Masini
- Carole Maso
- Cris Mazza
- Anna Monardo
- Christine Palamidessi Moore

== N–R ==
- Donna Jo Napoli
- Anne Paolucci
- Marge Pellegrino
- Lucia Perillo
- Lia Purpura
- Anna Quindlen
- Kym Ragusa
- Michelle Reale
- Rose Romano
- Agnes Rossi
- Suze Rotolo

== S–Z ==
- Julia Savarese
- Nancy Savoca
- Sandra Scoppettone
- Lisa Scottoline
- Maria Terrone
- Karen Tintori
- Mari Tomasi
- Adriana Trigiani
- Danielle Trussoni
- Catherine Tufariello
- Octavia Waldo
- Frances Winwar (Francesca Vinciguerra)

== See also ==
- Italian-American women
- Angelology by Danielle Trussoni
- Big Stone Gap by Adriana Trigiani
- Black and Blue by Anna Quindlen
- Commissario Brunetti series by Donna Leon
- The Company of Women by Mary Gordon
- Daughter of Venice by Donna Jo Napoli
- Death at La Fenice by Donna Leon
- Death in a Strange Country by Donna Leon
- Hush: An Irish Princess' Tale by Donna Jo Napoli
- If These Walls Could Talk by Nancy Savoca
- The Kin of Ata Are Waiting for You by Dorothy Bryant
- Like Lesser Gods by Mari Tomasi
- The Madwoman in the Attic by Sandra Gilbert
- Object Lessons by Anna Quindlen
- Paper Fish by Tina DeRosa
- Riding in Cars with Boys by Beverly D'Onofrio
- Rosato & Associates series by Lisa Scottoline
- The Smile by Donna Jo Napoli
- Stones in Water by Donna Jo Napoli
- Suzuki Beane by Sandra Scopettone
- Sweet Hope by Mary Bucci Bush
- True Love by Nancy Savoca
- Umbertina by Helen Barolini
- Were You Always an Italian? by Maria Laurino
