= April Smith (writer) =

American writer

- Born: The Bronx, New York City, United States
- Education: Bronx High School of Science; Boston University (BS); Stanford University
- Occupations: Novelist, screenwriter
- Writing career
- Genres: Historical fiction, mystery, crime fiction
- Website: www.aprilsmith.net

April Smith is an American novelist, television writer and producer. Her most recent novel, suspenseful historical fiction, is Home Sweet Home. Previously, A Star For Mrs. Blake, chosen by the Cincinnati Public Library as their 2014 "On The Same Page" all-city reads book . Other works include a series of four mystery/thrillers featuring FBI Special Agent Ana Grey. One of them, Good Morning, Killer, was adapted and executive produced by Smith for the TNT Mystery Movie Nights in 2011. She is also the author of a stand-alone thriller about the only woman baseball scout in the major leagues, Be the One.

== Education ==
A 1967 graduate of the Bronx High School of Science, Smith earned a BS with Distinction in English from Boston University and a master's degree in Creative Writing from Stanford University.

== Television producer and writer ==
Smith worked on several hit television series from the late 1970s through 2000 as producer, writer, and executive story editor, including Lou Grant, Cagney & Lacey, and Chicago Hope. She also adapted stories by Stephen King for the TNT series Nightmares & Dreamscapes.

She wrote teleplays for several made-for-TV movies, including the critically acclaimed 1998 remake of The Taking of Pelham One Two Three and the 1999 adaptation of the Anna Quindlen novel Black and Blue. She was nominated for an Emmy Award for her screenplay for Ernie Kovacs: Between the Laughter (1984).

In 2011 Smith penned the adaptation of her own novel Good Morning, Killer, for the TNT Mystery Movie Night series.

Smith's work has been nominated for three Emmys and two Writer's Guild awards.

== Novels ==
Smith is the author of seven novels published by Alfred A. Knopf in hardcover and Vintage trade paperback, including thrillers and historical novels of suspense.

The latest, Home Sweet Home (2017), is the epic saga of a family that becomes the victim of a murderous witch-hunt during the McCarthy era in 1950s South Dakota . A Star For Mrs. Blake (2014) is historical fiction based on the Gold Star Mothers pilgrimages of the 1930s, during which the U.S. government authorized funds for widows and mothers of soldiers killed during World War I and buried overseas to visit the graves of their loved ones. Now a forgotten footnote in history, almost 7,000 American women made the journey. It was the first official recognition of the sacrifices made by women during times of war.

She is also known for four novels of suspense featuring FBI Special Agent Ana Grey as the central character: North of Montana (1994), Good Morning, Killer (2003), Judas Horse (2008), and White Shotgun (2011), as well as a standalone thriller about the only woman baseball scout in major league baseball, Be the One, (2000), and two young adult books based on the TV series James at 15.
