= Arkansas literature =

Arkansas literature has an emerging consciousness, though it still lags behind other Southern states such as Mississippi and Georgia in the promotion of its literary culture. University of Arkansas Press is probably the state's largest publisher of books, though there do exist some notable small presses in the state: August House, Rose Publishing Group, and Chenault and Gray. The University of Arkansas's M.F.A. program has graduated a number of notable writers, including Lewis Nordan, John Dufresne, Steve Yarbrough, and more. In 2004, the state held the first annual Arkansas Literary Festival in Little Rock, attracting famous writers from around the nation. The Porter Prize is the state's most prestigious literary award.

== List of Arkansas residents and natives who have achieved a national stature for their writing ==
- Maya Angelou, whose I Know Why the Caged Bird Sings tells the story of her young life in Stamps, Arkansas.
- Dee Brown, author of Bury My Heart at Wounded Knee.
- John Gould Fletcher, 1938 winner of the Pulitzer Prize in Poetry.
- Ellen Gilchrist, winner of the 1984 National Book Award for her collection of short stories Victory over Japan, and author of more than twenty works of fiction.
- John Grisham, national and international best-selling author, from Black Oak, Arkansas (born in Jonesboro). Many of his books have been turned into movies, including A Painted House, which is set in Black Oak.
- Donald Harington, winner of the Robert Penn Warren Award for his many novels which take place in the fictional town of Stay More, Arkansas.
- Charles Portis, author of True Grit, which was made into a movie starring John Wayne.
- Mary Bucci Bush, author of Sweet Hope.
- Padma Viswanathan, playwright, novelist, translator, and memoirist. In 2026, she was shortlisted for International Booker Prize.
- Geoffrey Brock, poet and translator.

== Literary journals in Arkansas ==
- Toad Suck Review, a print literary journal published by the Department of Writing at the University of Central Arkansas, toadsuckreview.org.
- Arkansas Literary Forum, an online publication of Henderson State University, which has published such notable Arkansas Writers as Jack Butler and Donald Harington.
- Arkansas Review: A Journal of Delta Studies, a tri-annual journal published by Arkansas State University; it is the successor to the Kansas Quarterly.
- The Low Valley Review, a yearly print journal published by NorthWest Arkansas Community College, thelowvalleyreview.com
- The Oxford American, a quarterly journal of Southern culture once supported by John Grisham and now published by the University of Central Arkansas in Conway.
- The Natural Tale, a quarterly online journal of Arkansas-exclusive fiction and art.
- The Arkansas International, a print literary journal published by the Program in Creative Writing and Translation at the University of Arkansas.

== See also ==
- List of newspapers in Arkansas
- Southern United States literature

== Bibliography ==
- Federal Writers' Project (1941), "Literature", Arkansas: a Guide to the State, American Guide Series, New York, pp. 108+, hdl:2027/mdp.39015002678947, OCLC 478887 – via HathiTrust
- G. Thomas Tanselle (1971). "Regional Lists: Arkansas". Guide to the Study of United States Imprints. Harvard University Press. p. 7+. ISBN 978-0-674-36761-6.
