= Black and Blue (disambiguation) =

Black and Blue is a 1976 album by The Rolling Stones.

Black and Blue may also refer to:

- A euphemism for bruising of a person's flesh
- Black and blue, another name for Pittsburgh rare, a way to prepare steak

== Film and television ==
- Black and Blue (1999 film), a television film starring Mary Stuart Masterson
- Black and Blue (2019 film), an American drama film starring Naomie Harris and Tyrese Gibson
- Black and Blue (TV series), a six-part TV comedy-drama series
- "Black and Blue" (Better Call Saul), a 2022 television episode
- "Black and Blue" (Doctors), a 2003 television episode
- "Black and Blue" (Homicide: Life on the Street), a 1994 television episode
- "Black and Blue" (Law & Order), a 2022 television episode
- "Black & Blue" (Rebus), a 2000 television episode, based on the Ian Rankin book

== Books ==
- Black and Blue (Quindlen novel), a 1998 novel by Anna Quindlen
- Black & Blue (Rankin novel), a 1997 novel by Ian Rankin
- Black and Blue: A memoir of racism and resilience, a 2021 non-fiction book by Veronica Gorrie

== Music ==
- Black 'n Blue, a glam metal band
- Black and Blue Festival, an annual circuit party held in Montreal
- Black and Blue (musical), a 1989 Tony Award-winning Broadway musical
- Black and Blue (video) a 1980 video of a concert tour co-headlining Black Sabbath and Blue Öyster Cult
- Black & Blue Records, a French jazz label

=== Albums ===
- Black and Blue, a 1962 album by Lou Rawls
- Black & Blue (Harold Melvin & the Blue Notes album), 1973
- Black and Blue, a 1991 album by Gene Harris
- Black & Blue (Backstreet Boys album), 2000
- Blak and Blu, a 2012 album by Gary Clark, Jr.
- Side B of the 2024 No Name LP by Jack White

=== Songs ===
- "Black and Blue" (Fats Waller song), 1929
- "Black and Blue" (Chain song), 1971
- "Black and Blue" (Van Halen song), 1988
- "Black & Blue" (Miike Snow song), 2009
- "Black & Blue" (Guy Sebastian song), 2015
- "Black and Blue", by Archive from the 2015 album Restriction
- "Black and Blue", by Agnostic Front from the 2007 album Warriors
- "Black and Blue", by Air Supply from the 1985 album Air Supply
- "Black and Blue", by Brand New Sin from the 2005 album Recipe for Disaster
- "Black and Blue", by Crystal Lake from the 2016 album True North
- "Black and Blue", by Edie Brickell from the 1990 album Ghost of a Dog
- "Black and Blue", by Gino Vannelli from the 1977 album A Pauper in Paradise
- "Black and Blue", by Ingrid Michaelson from the 2012 album Human Again
- "Black and Blue", by Haywire from the 1987 album Don't Just Stand There
- "Black and Blue", by Sonic Syndicate from the 2010 album We Rule the Night
- "Black and Blue", by Soul Asylum from the 1984 album Say What You Will, Clarence... Karl Sold the Truck
- "Black and Blue", by The Walls
- "Black & Blue", by Brand Nubian from the 1993 album In God We Trust
- "Black & Blue", by Bring Me the Horizon from the 2006 album Count Your Blessings
- "Black & Blue", by The Devil Wears Prada from the 2013 album 8:18
- "Black&Blue", by Vince Staples from the 2024 album Dark Times
- "Blk & Blu", by Chase & Status, 2014

== Sports ==
- Inter Milan, the Italian football club is often called "Black and Blue" (Italian: 'Nerazzurri') because of its kit colors
- The NFC North in the National Football League is often called the "black and blue division" for its intense rivalries and rough style of play

== See also ==
- The dress (viral phenomenon) with hashtag #blackandblue
- Negro y Azul (Spanish for 'Black and Blue')
