= Christine Palamidessi Moore =

American novelist

- Born: Pittsburgh, Pennsylvania, U.S.
- Education: Boston University (MA)
- Occupations: Writer; novelist

Christine Palamidessi Moore (born in Pittsburgh, Pennsylvania) is an Italian-American writer and novelist.

== Life ==
She graduated from Boston University with a Master of Arts from the Creative Writing Department where she studied with Leslie Epstein, Sue Miller and Richard Elman. She taught writing at the University from 1993 to 2000.

Her work appeared in Andy Warhol's Interview, New Woman Magazine, New Video Magazine, Saturday Evening Post, The New York Times, The Boston Globe, Italian Americana, Aethlon and Stone's Throw. Her memoir, Grandmothers, won a Boston MBTA Monument Award and was engraved on a granite monolith displayed at Jackson Square on Boston's Orange Line.

Her novel, The Virgin Knows, is set in Boston's Italian neighborhood, the North End.

She has been a Senior Editor at Italian Americana since 2000.

== Works ==
- The Virgin Knows. St. Martin's. 1993. ISBN 0-312-13203-4.
- The Fiddle Case. Gate. 2010. ISBN 9780982638316.
- Albright, Carol Bonomo; Moore, Christine Palamidessi (2011). American Woman, Italian Style with editor Carol Bonomo Albright. Fordham University Press. ISBN 9780823231768.

=== Anthologies ===
- Carol Bonomo Albright; Joanna Clapps Herman, eds. (2008). "Card Palace". Wild Dreams: The Best of Italian Americana. Fordham Univ Press. p. 283. ISBN 978-0-8232-2910-9. "christine palamidessi moore."
- Regina Barreca, ed. (2002). Don't Tell Mama: The Penguin Book of Italian American Writing. Penguin Books. ISBN 978-0-14-200247-6.
- Carol Bonomo Albright and Joanna Clapps Herman, ed. (2006). Our Roots Are Deep with Passion: creative nonfiction collects essays by Italian Americans. Other Press. ISBN 978-1-59051-242-5.
