= Giuseppe Longobardi =

Italian linguist and academic

- Born
- Occupations: Linguist and academic

Academic background
- Education: Laurea; Diploma di Licenza
- Alma mater: University of Pisa and Scuola Normale Superiore

Giuseppe Longobardi is a linguist and academic who serves as an Anniversary Professor at the University of York and is an elected Member of the Academia Europaea. He is most known for combining generative grammatical principles with problems of analytic philosophy, such as the expression of reference, and with historical-comparative explanations.

Longobardi initially focused on the study of syntactic long-distance dependencies, later expanding to the syntax-semantics mapping (reference in proper names and generics, negation, predication) and to the limits of grammatical variability. He then developed the Parametric Comparison Method to reconstruct language families and address paleo-anthropological questions by comparing linguistic and biological diversity.

Longobardi has contributed to syntactic theory and historical syntax through various journals, authored and edited volumes with Cambridge University Press and Oxford University Press, and co-edited a special issue of the Journal of Historical Syntax.

== Education ==
Longobardi earned his degrees in Classics and Linguistics from the University of Pisa and the Scuola Normale Superiore in 1978, followed by a postgraduate fellowship from 1979 to 1981.

== Career ==
Longobardi began his academic career as an assistant professor at Scuola Normale Superiore from 1981 to 1987. He later assumed the role of associate professor at the University of Venice in 1987 before advancing to professor. From 1997 to 2017, he was a professor at the University of Trieste. He has been serving as an Anniversary Professor of language and linguistic science at the University of York since 2012.

Since 2013, he has been the Co-founder and Coordinator of the Collaborative International Research Centre for Linguistic History and Diversity at the University of York, collaborating with the University of Pennsylvania and Universidade Estadual de Campinas.

== Research ==
Longobardi's research encompasses theoretical, comparative, and historical syntax, with a particular focus on Romance, Germanic, and Classical languages; its main domains are parameter theory, the syntax/reference interface, diachronic and phylogenetic linguistics, and the intersection of linguistics with population genetics. He served as the Principal Investigator of the large interdisciplinary ERC Advanced Grant 'Meeting Darwin's Last Challenge' at the University of York.

Longobardi started by researching Gothic syntax, the theory of long-distance dependencies, and proposing a unified semantic theory of copular constructions. He has been involved in designing three research programs: Topological Mapping Theories, Parametric Minimalism, and the Parametric Comparison Method. He emphasized the importance of structural position in mapping nominal elements to their ontological correspondents (Topological Mapping), deriving applications of classical analytic notions like reference, generality, and quantification from DP-internal configurations. In addition, he has initiated the study of a restrictive format for parametric theories of grammatical diversity (Parametric Minimalism).

Since the beginning of the 2000s, Longobardi has developed a new method for formally comparing languages on the basis of their syntactic systems instead of lexical etymologies (Parametric Comparison Method). The Parametric Comparison Method is a research program that has merged the insights of the 19th century's historical-comparative method with those of modern generative syntactic theory. This approach has been intended as a tool for phylogenetic reconstruction and for comparison with results from independent disciplines such as archaeology and population genetics, while also aiming to ground historical linguistics within modern cognitive theories and natural sciences. Through it, he has started to research global syntactic diversity beyond Indo-European, using a parametric approach to grammatical description while also enhancing the study of language diversity from a synchronic perspective.

In related research, Longobardi co-edited Historical Syntax and Linguistic Theory with Paola Crisma, which explored language change and syntactic evolution, focusing on internal and external influences across diverse languages. Previously, his book The Syntax of Noun Phrases: Configuration, Parameters and Empty Categories co-authored alongside Alessandra Giorgi, examined noun phrase structure in a Government and Binding framework, comparing Romance and Germanic languages, and was called "an excellent book" by American linguist Donna Jo Napoli.

== Bibliography ==
=== Books ===
- The Syntax of Noun Phrases: Configuration, Parameters and Empty Categories (1991) ISBN 978-0521370042
- Historical Syntax and Linguistic Theory (2009) ISBN 978-0199560547

=== Selected articles ===
- Longobardi, G. (1994). Reference and proper names: A theory of N-movement in syntax and logical form. Linguistic inquiry, 609-665.
- Longobardi, G. (2001). The structure of DPs: Some principles, parameters, and problems. In The handbook of contemporary syntactic theory, 562-603. Blackwell.
- Longobardi, G. (2001). How comparative is semantics? A unified parametric theory of bare nouns and proper names. Natural language semantics, 9(4), 335-369.
- Longobardi, G. (2001). Formal syntax, diachronic minimalism, and etymology: the history of French chez. Linguistic inquiry, 32(2), 275-302.
- Longobardi, G. (2005). Toward a unified grammar of reference. Zeitschrift für Sprachwissenschaft, 24(1), 5-44.
- Longobardi, G. and Guardiano C. (2009). Evidence for syntax as a signal of historical relatedness, Lingua, 119 (11), 1679-1706.
- Crisma, P., Guardiano, C., & Longobardi, G. (2024). A unified theory of Case form and Case meaning. Genitives and parametric syntax. In The place of Case in grammar, 427-466. Oxford University Press.
