= Black and Blue (1999 film) =

1999 American TV movie

- Written by: Anna Quindlen
- Teleplay by: April Smith
- Directed by: Paul Shapiro
- Starring: Mary Stuart Masterson; Anthony LaPaglia; Will Rothhaar; Sam Robards
- Country of origin: United States
- Original language: English

Production
- Running time: 96 minutes

Original release
- Release: November 17, 1999

Black and Blue is a 1999 American made-for-TV movie starring Mary Stuart Masterson and Anthony LaPaglia. It was based on the novel by Anna Quindlen.

== Plot ==
The story centers around Frances Benedetto (Mary Stuart Masterson), who desperately escapes from the clutches of an abusive marriage. After years of living under the increasing violence of her husband, Bobby (Anthony LaPaglia), Frances takes her son, Robert (Will Rothhaar), and flees from their New York home to a small town in Florida. After enrolling Robert in school there, she befriends her son's P.E. coach, Mike Riordan (Sam Robards). Several months pass, and the two fall in love, but with the unshakable fact that Frances still lives under the terrorizing thought that her husband will eventually find her.

After she unknowingly appears on national television, her husband, an officer of the NYPD, is able to track her down. He attacks her in her home and kidnaps Robert from his school. Mike, after realizing that Frances, now under the alias of Beth Crenshaw, failed to pick Robert up, makes his way to her home and finds her pummeled and unconscious on the floor of her kitchen. Five years pass, and Frances has since never seen her son. She has married Mike and they have a daughter together. The film ends with Robert finding Frances's sister, and Frances receiving a phone call that implies that she will soon be reunited with her son.
