= Object Lessons =

Object Lessons may refer to:

- Object Lessons (book series), an essay and book series about the hidden lives of ordinary things
- Object Lessons (novel), a 1991 novel by Anna Quindlen
- Object lesson, a teaching method that consists of using a physical object or visual aid
