= Marion Benasutti =

American writer

Marion Benasutti in 1985

Marion Benasutti (née Gosette; 1908–1992) was an American writer. The daughter of immigrants from Northern Italy, she was born in Brandy Camp, Pennsylvania, and grew up in Philadelphia. She learned English in school as a child, and never finished high school, yet enjoyed a successful writing career.

Benasutti was the women's editor of Philadelphia's Italian-American Herald, contributing news, features, and a column (Speaking Italian). Her stories and articles have been published widely in magazines such as Reader's Digest, McCall's, Redbook, Seventeen, the Literary Review, and American Home; and in anthologies such as Rose Basile Green's The Italian-American Novel: A Document of the Interaction of Two Cultures (1974) and Helen Barolini's The Dream Book: An Anthology of Writings by Italian American Women (1985). In 1966, she published a novel titled No SteadyJob for Papa. (Note: "SteadyJob" is treated as a compound word in the title. See title page of 1966 edition.) It tells the story of an immigrant family in Pennsylvania during World War I, struggling to get by despite the father's inability to hold down a steady job. The book was later republished in Germany and Italy.

She married Frank Benasutti, an engineer, in 1930, and had two sons. She died in Huntingdon Valley, Pennsylvania, on December 28, 1992, and was buried in the Holy Sepulchre Cemetery in Cheltenham, Pennsylvania.
