= Joanna Clapps Herman =

Italian American writer, editor and poet (born 1944)

- Born: 1944 (age 81–82); Waterbury, CT
- Education: City College of New York, M.A., SUNY Empire State College, B.A.
- Known for: Creative nonfiction, Italian American themes, memoir, poetry
- Scientific career
- Fields: Creative nonfiction, fiction
- Workplaces: Manhattanville College

Joanna Clapps Herman is an Italian American writer, editor and poet. She is the author of three books of prose, editor of two anthologies, and her essays and writing have been published in many anthologies and literary journals, including Creative Nonfiction, Inkwell and The Massachusetts Review.

She teaches at Manhattanville College, where she is on the Master's of Fine Arts faculty in creative writing.

== Education ==
Herman has a Bachelor of Arts in English from SUNY Empire State College and a Master of Arts in American Studies from City College of New York, where she studied with Francine du Plessix Gray. Herman's writing topics often include her Italian American heritage and family.

== Honors and awards ==
- Italian Americana's The Bruno Arcudi Literature Prize for "Perfect Hatred."
- The Henry Paolucci Award for "Falling."
- The Chase Award for Literary Excellence
- Finalist for the 2011 ForeWord Book of the Year for "Anarchist Bastard: Growing Up Italian in America."
- Medal for Literary Excellence, The Litchfield Review.
- Work featured by The Italian American Writers Association (IAWA) at Cornelia Street Cafe and the Poets and Writers' Piazza at Hofstra University's Italian Experience.

== Heritage and family history ==
Herman was born to second-generation Italian American parents. Her grandparents are all from the province of Basilicata, also known as Lucania. These towns are part of the area's ancient history. Her father's family is from Avigliano, where the name Claps is a common one. Her mother's family (Becce), is from Tolve, which it is said Hannibal burned to the ground on his sweep through Italy. In the fields outside Tolve, are the remains of a 4th Century BCE Roman Villa.

The customs of this part of Italy were kept alive during her childhood in America. Herman's maternal grandparents were farmers and cheesemakers The men in her paternal family were blacksmiths in Avigliano and became ironworkers in the U.S. This history is reflected in Herman's writing, where the subject of being a southern Italian woman raised in a Post-World War II New England industrial town, is addressed.

== Publications and works ==
=== Books ===
- When I Am Italian: quando sono italiana. SUNY Press. 2020. ISBN 978-1-4384-7718-3..
- No Longer and Not Yet: Short Stories. SUNY Press. 2014. ISBN 978-1-4384-5034-6..
- The Anarchist Bastard: Growing Up Italian in America. SUNY Press. 2011. ISBN 978-1-4384-3631-9.
- Carol Bonomo Albright & Joanna Clapps Herman, eds. (2008). Wild Dreams: The Best of Italian Americana. Fordham University Press, (2008). ISBN 978-0-8232-2910-9. Fordham University Press, 2008. This anthology is referenced on Wiki's Italian American entry.
- Joanna Clapps Herman & Lee Gutkind, eds. (2006). Our Roots Are Deep with Passion: Creative Nonfiction Collects New Essays by Italian-American Writers. Other Press, (Fall 2007). ISBN 1-59051-242-1. Introduction written by Italian American actor, Joe Mantegna.

=== Prose ===
- Joanna Clapps Herman; Anna Mudd (10 October 2016). What We Remember. Mutha, a graphic memoir.
- “Stitching Our Voices Together” in Edvige Giunta & Joseph Sciorra (eds.). Embroidered Lines and Cut Threads: Women's Domestic Needlework in the Italian Diaspora. University of Mississippi Press, (2014).
- “Visiting Our Dead,” in Religions Special Issue "Writers and Critics on Loss, Love, and the Supernatural” Fall, 2013.
- “Flesh, Bone, and Song" in Map Literary: A Journal of Contemporary Writing and Art, William Paterson University, Fall 2012.
- "Psychic Arrangements" in Mary Saracino, ed. (2012). She is Everywhere! Volume 3: An Anthology of Writings in Womanist/Feminist Spirituality. iUniverse, (February 15, 2012). ISBN 978-1-4620-6433-5.
- " U Bizza di Creanza: A Piece of Politeness," Alimentum, Fall, 2010.
- "My Aboriginal Women" in Gloria Vando & Philip Miller, eds. (September 2009). Lavanderia: Wash, Women and Word. Sunbelt Publications, (Fall 2009). ISBN 978-0-9816020-6-6. Winner of the 16th Annual San Diego Book Awards Association for Best Anthology.
- "My Homer" in Dr. Luisa Del Giudice, ed. (18 December 2009). Oral History, Oral Culture, and Italian Americans. Palgrave, (October 2009). ISBN 978-0-230-61947-0.
- "Words and Rags" in Creative Nonfiction. Fall 2006.
- " Est, Est, Est, Estate, in Leggendaria, October 2004, Roma, Italia.
- "Night Rifts," in Italian Americana, Spring 2004.
- "Papone" in Regina Barreca, ed. (2002). Don't Tell Mama: The Penguin Book of Italian American Writing. Penguin, (2002). ISBN 0-14-200247-X.
- "Coffee And" in Edvige Guinta & Louise DeSalvo, eds. (August 2003). The Milk of Almonds: Italian American Women Writers on Food and Culture. Feminist Press, (2002). ISBN 1-55861-453-2.
- "Perfect Hatred" in Italian Americana, 2001.
- "The Discourse of un'Proprio Paparon " in Domenica DiLeo; Gabriella Micallef & Patrizia Tavourmina, eds. (1998). Curaggia: Writing by Women of Italian Descent. Women's Press: Toronto, (Fall 1998). ISBN 0-88961-231-5.
- "Snow Struck" in The Massachusetts Review, Spring 1997.
- "No Longer and Not Yet" in The Massachusetts Review, Winter 1997, Vol. XXXVII, No. 4.

=== Poetry ===
- "The Smell of Language" in Italian Americana, Summer 2012.
- "My Italian Father Gives Birth," Feile-Festa, Fall 2009.
- "On a Brown Street" in Inkwell (journal), Spring 2009.
- "My Skin Turns to Bark" in Inkwell (journal), Spring 2008.
- "On the Roof," Protest Poems Poetry Anthology, Winter 1998.
- "Open Windows in a Cool Row" and "Each Early Spring," The Slackwater Review, Vol. 4, No. 1, 1981.

== Book reviews ==
- Donna Lee Miele, Review of "No Longer Not Yet", The Rockland Times, March 20, 2014.
- Lisa Jardine, Review of "No Longer and Not Yet," The Harrison Review, March 2014.
- Fred Gardaphe, "Family Writing Workshop: review of The Anarchist Bastard: Growing Up Italian in America," October, 2011.
- Ciao America!, review of The Anarchist Bastard: Growing Up Italian in America, June 2011.
- Feile-Festa: The Literary Arts Journal of The Mediterranean Celtic Cultural Association and Paradiso-Parthas Press, review of "The Anarchist Bastard: Growing Up Italian in America," SUNY Press, Spring 2011.
- Mary Donnarumma Sharnick, "The Anarchist Bastard: And Other Tales of Growing Up Italian in America (review)." The Connecticut Muse, Spring 2011.
- Donna Miele, "Review of The Anarchist Bastard: Growing Up Italian in America," The Rockland Times, April 2011.
- Good Reads, Community Reviews of The Anarchist Bastard: Growing Up Italian in America.
- Joanna's books have also been reviewed by San Francisco Book Review and Italian American Digest.
- Our Roots are Deep With Passion reviews, including Publishers Weekly, Newsday, Liberty Journal, ForeWord Reviews, and Reference & Research Book News: Other Press, 2006.
- Alane Salierno Mason, Buona Sera, Social Clubs? 3 Italian American Anthologies Reviewed, Boston Review, October/November 2003.

== External links and interviews ==
- Interviews with Herman about her book, The Anarchist Bastard can be heard on Wisconsin Public Radio's Here On Earth: Radio Without Borders and on Connecticut's WPKN Radio.
- Joanna Clapps Herman mentioned on Wiki's List of Italian American Women Writers and Italian American articles.
- Peter Hobbs, " 'Coffee And...' Memories of Mothers From Another World", on Joanna Clapps Herman's newest memoir, NonaBrooklyn.com, May 2011. Retrieved October 24, 2012.
- Liliana Rosano, "Emigrazione & Letteratura, Joanna Clapps: dalla Basilicata all NY anni '60," America Oggi, October 16, 2011.
- Dorothy Zinn, Joanna Clapps Herman Book Interview Event in Italy, Montescaglioso, August 2011.
- Ilenia Litturi, From New York, with the Basilicata in the heart, SudItaliaVideo, Basilicata, Italy, June 6, 2011.
- Brian Francis Slattery, "Aboriginal Family: What happened when an Anarchist Bastard raised a tribe of Italian Americans in the WASP-y Land of Steady Habits", New Haven Advocate, April 13, 2011.
