= Monardo =

Monardo is a surname. Notable people with the surname include:

- Anna Monardo (born 1956), American novelist
- Domenico Monardo (1939–2023), known as Meco, American record producer and musician
- Doni Monardo (1963–2023), Indonesian Army lieutenant general
