= Calio =

Calio may refer to:

- Calio, North Dakota, an American city
- Anthony J. Calio (1929–2012), American physicist and executive
- Christopher T. Calio, American businessman, CEO of RTX Corporation
- Louisa Calio (born 1947), American writer and performance artist
- Calio site, an ancient fossil site in Sulawesi, Indonesia
