= Mary Bucci Bush =

American writer and academic

- Born: Canastota, New York, U.S.
- Education: State University of New York at Buffalo; Syracuse University
- Writing career
- Genre: Fiction
- Notable work: Sweet Hope
- Website: www.marybuccibush.com

Mary Bucci Bush is an American author and has been a professor of English and creative writing at California State University, Los Angeles.

== Early life and education ==
Mary Bucci Bush was born and raised in Canastota, New York. The family name was changed to Bush by American schoolteachers who had trouble pronouncing Bucci.

After receiving a B.A. in English at the State University of New York at Buffalo in 1972, Bush earned her M.A. and D.A. in creative writing at Syracuse University, where she studied under George P. Elliott and Raymond Carver.

== Career ==
=== Academia ===
Bush taught at Syracuse University and Hamilton College. In 1984 she co-founded the Community Writers Project in Syracuse with fellow novelist Rachel Guido deVries.

As of 2017 she was professor of English and creative writing at California State University, Los Angeles.

=== Writing ===
Her fiction has appeared in literary journals such as Ploughshares, The Missouri Review, The Black Warrior Review, and Italian Americana; and in anthologies such as The Voices We Carry: Recent Italian American Women's Fiction (Guernica, 2007), Growing Up Ethnic in America (Penguin, 1999), and The Milk of Almonds: Italian American Women Writers on Food and Culture (Feminist Press at CUNY, 2017).

The novel Sweet Hope (Guernica Editions, 2011), tells the story of Italian and African-American families living and working together on a Mississippi Delta cotton plantation in the early 1900s. It was inspired by the experiences of Bush's grandmother, who worked on the Sunnyside Plantation in Arkansas as a child.

== Recognition ==
Bush won a PEN/Nelson Algren Award for her collection of short stories, A Place of Light, in 1987; a National Endowment for the Arts creative writing fellowship in 1995; and the Tillie Olsen Book Prize from the Working Class Studies Association for her novel, Sweet Hope, in 2012.
