= Louisa Calio =

American poet and writer

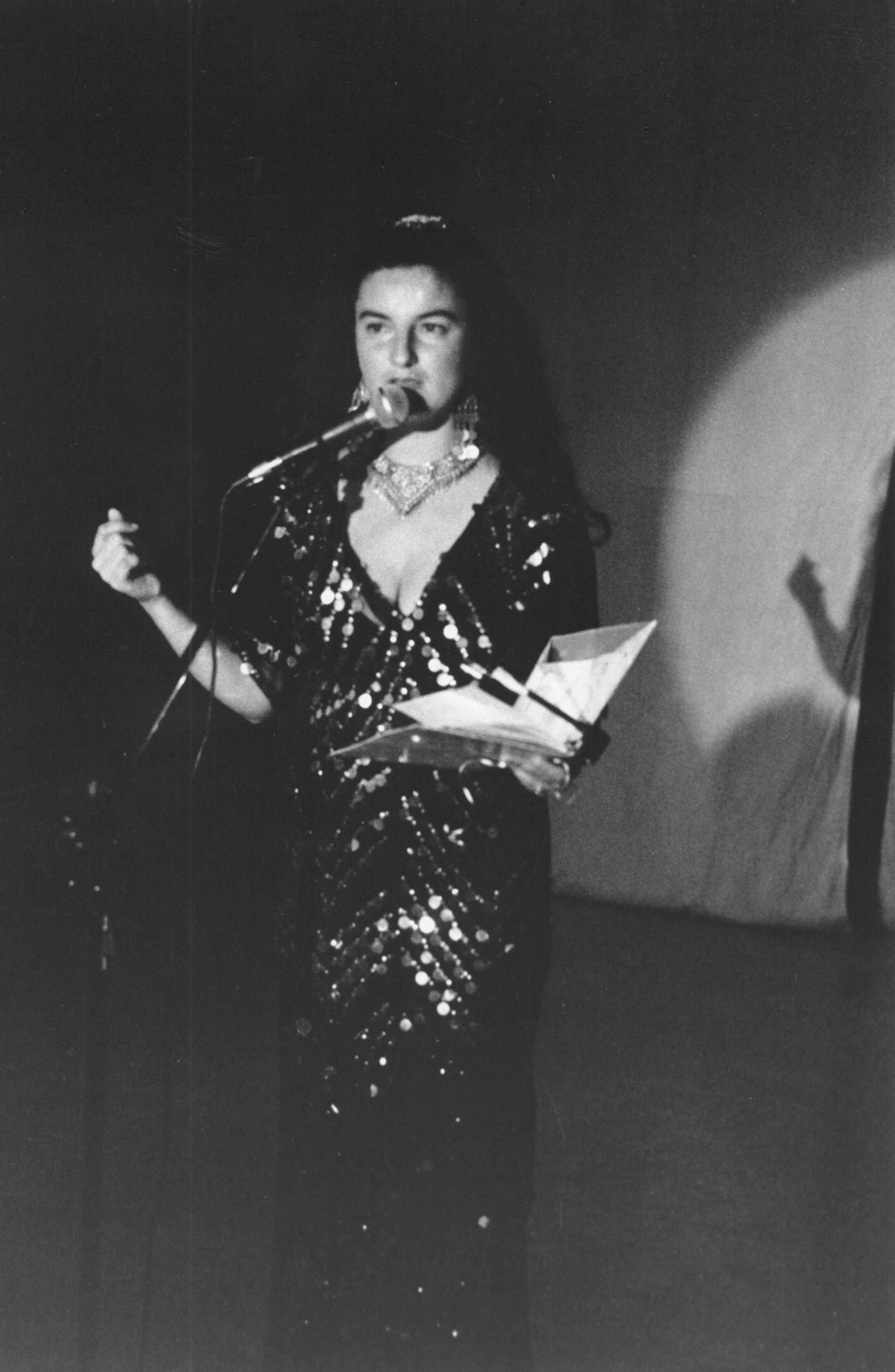
Louisa Calio reading poetry

Louisa Calio (born July 4, 1947 in Gravesend, Brooklyn) is an American poet, writer, multimedia performance artist and teacher. She has directed the Poets and Writers' Piazza for Hofstra University's Italian Experience for the past 10 years. Calio's writings have appeared internationally in anthologies, magazines and journals. She has been honored by Barnard College, Columbia University as a Feminist Who Changed America Second Wave 1963–1975. She has traveled to East and West Africa, lived in the Caribbean and documented her journeys in photographs and the written word, completing an epic poem "Journey to the Heart Waters" which was also the title of an exhibition of photos and poems that opened at Round Hill Resort in Montego Bay in 2007.

== Background and family ==
Louisa Calio was born to Joseph and Rose Calio in Gravesend, Brooklyn. Her mother was named the Brenda Frasier of Lafayette High School and worked as a secretary when she married Joseph Calio, a Sicilian American whose family came from Palermo and Agrigento. Joseph was a World War II veteran and Vice President in charge of Production for Ralph Lauren Corporation's Women's Wear and the founder and officer in the Progressive Dress Club and Americans of Italian Descent (AID).

== Life and career ==
Calio attended Herricks High School and studied English at SUNY Albany, graduating magna cum laude. Calio began her career as an English teacher in Waterford, NY and then worked in the inner city schools of Philadelphia for five years, branching out into the arts with Jackie Teamor at Philadelphia Museum of Art's urban arts development program. After earning her master's degree in education at Temple University, she moved to New Haven, CT and began her career as a performance poet. Calio traveled to East and West Africa and studied independently with Robert Farris Thompson. They developed ritual performances inspired by both Italian and African traditions together at Yale School of Art and Architecture.

Calio's writing has appeared internationally in prestigious anthologies, magazines and journals like Gradiva, Descant (magazine), Voices in Italian Americana/Bordighera Press, Journal of Italian Translation, Feile-Festa, New Verse News, The Gleaner, Studia Mystica and feminist magazine, Salome. She has written extensively about women and her interest in East and West Africa and the Caribbean, where she lived for over 25 years. Documenting her journeys in photographic images, as well as the written word, she exhibited her photos at the Broward County Library, the Sangster International Airport and Round Hill Hotel and Villas, Montego Bay in "A Passion for Africa," based on a lifelong attraction to Nubia and the Nile and "A Passion for Jamaica," reading from her book in progress, A Day in the Tropics. She is a member of The Long Island Writers' Guild and the Italian American Writers Association.

Calio was a founding member and the first Executive Director of City Spirit Artists, Inc. (1976–1981), a nonprofit organization in New Haven, Connecticut, funded by a Bicentennial Grant to make arts available to divergent populations. The program, which was to last one year, was developed by Calio into a project and later incorporated with her effort and efforts by members of her board who included Mary Hunter Wolf, President of the Center for Theater Techniques, Elisabeth Kubler, President of Long Wharf Theatre and U.S. Representative Rosa DeLauro. Yale University, ACES Educational Center for the Arts, Yale's African American Center, educators, businessmen and women, City Spirit made the arts readily accessible for free through grants, in jails, halfway houses, senior citizen homes, community centers, public schools, hospitals and hospices. Calio later served as a creative writing instructor and a grants consultant to its board of directors for ten years. City Spirit Artists lasted 25 years.

She has directed and performed multimedia productions of her work set to dance and music by jazz composers Oliver Lake and Wadada Leo Smith at Yale University, Albertus Magnus College, ACES Educational Center for the Arts for many years. She is also a certified Sivananda Yoga instructor.

== Awards and honors ==
- First Prize in the 4th International Poetry Contest, City of Messina, Sicily, for poem "Bhari – the meeting place of the Blue and white Niles." (2013).
- Finalist for Poet Laureate Nassau County, New York, (2013).
- Named by Barnard College, Columbia University, along with Alice Walker, Ruth Bader Ginsburg as a Feminist Who Changed America Second Wave 1963–1975 and documented in the book of the same title. (2006)
- Women in Leadership Award for outstanding work in the arts and community by Greater New Haven community YWCA (1987)
- The Barbara Jones Memorial Prize for Literature on Poetry Day, for a poem and essay in The New Voices, Trinidad and Tobago, Vol. XII (1984)
- The Taliesin Prize for Poetry awarded by The New Voices, Trinidad and Tobago (1983)
- ACES Educational Center for the Arts Grant for the Production of In the Eye of Balance, Calio's first collection of poetry (1978)
- Connecticut Commission on the Arts Award to Individual Writers (1978)

== Works ==
=== Anthologies ===
- "Churchillo," short story in Ed Maruggi, ed. (2011). A Collection of Humorous Happenings while Traveling in Italy & Other Witty Tidbits. Winston Publishing, (2011). ISBN 978-0-9658870-3-8.
- "Signifyin Woman" in Venera Fazio and Delia De Santis, ed. (2010). Sweet Lemons 2, International Writings with a Sicilian Accent. Legas Publications, (2010). ISBN 978-1881901761.
- Poems in Tammy Nuzzo-Morgan, ed with Edmund Miller, Allen Planz and Peter Thabit-Jones (2009). Long Island Sounds: From Maspeth to Montauk and Beyond, 2009 An Anthology of Poetry. The North Sea Poetry Scene Press, (2009). ISBN 978-0976279587.
- "Body of Joy" in Carolyn Brigit Flynn, ed. Foreword by Deena Metzger (2009). Sister's Singing Blessings, Prayers, Art, Songs, Poetry and Sacred Stories. Wild Girl Publishing, (2009). ISBN 978-0972814621.
- "In Search of a Deeper Truth Eritrea, My Ithaca" in Mari Jo Moore, ed. (2008). Birthed from Scorched Hearts: Women Respond to War. Fulcrum Publishing, (2008). ISBN 978-1555916657.
- "Mama Mia to the Tune of Abba," "My Goddess Mother" and "The Other Grandmother" in Edward Maruggi, ed. (2009). Remembrances: Sixty Tales of Growing Up with Italian Mothers, Grandmothers and Godmothers. Winston Publishing, (2008). ISBN 9780965887021.
- "Poet as Initiate" essay in Lucia Chiavola Birnbaum, ed. (2005). She Is Everywhere!: An anthology of writing in womanist/feminist spirituality. Belladonna Press, (2005). ISBN 978-0595340347.
- "Lucia Means Light" story and "A Well Lived Life" poem in Edward Maruggi, ed. (2004). Italian Heart, American Soul. Winston Publications, (2003). ISBN 978-0965887014.
- "Children of the Sixties" in Lucia Chiavola Birnbaum (2001). dark mother: African origins and godmothers. Belladonna Publications, Berkeley, CA, (2001). ISBN 978-0595208418.

=== Books ===
- Journey to the Heart Waters. Legas Press. 2014. ISBN 978-1939693020.
- In the Eye of Balance. Paradiso Press. 1978. ASIN B000ILKBDW.

=== Poems ===
- "Fast Food Jamaican Style," 2010.
- "In Grandfather's Garden/Nel Giardino Nonno, 2009.
- "For Valentino Lo Bianco," 2008.
- "The Weaker Sex," "Angie's Hands Have Seasoning" and "Lucia in Grandfather's Garden" with Italian translations by Elisabetta Marino.
- "Cells Remember the Dark Mother," 2007.
- "Eritrea My Ithaca", 2006.
- "Black Madonnas Fly From Me," 2006. in Gradiva, edited by Luigi Fontanella.
- "Desert Flower," 1978.
- "Come Eat my Roses," 1978.

=== Productions and performances ===
- "A Passion for Jamaica." Curator of photography and poetry exhibition.

=== Essays ===
- "John O'Donohue: The Celtic Soul," 2010.
- "LightPlay" (an excerpt from the novel Luica Means Light).
