= Sweet Hope =

2011 novel by Mary Bucci Bush

- Author: Mary Bucci Bush
- Language: English
- Subject: Italian Americans; Peonage
- Genre: Historical fiction
- Publisher: Guernica Editions
- Publication date: 2011
- Publication place: United States
- Pages: 401
- Awards: Tillie Olsen Award
- ISBN: 9781550713428
- OCLC: 712851462
- Dewey Decimal: 813/.6
- LC Class: PS3602.U8394 S94 2011

Sweet Hope (2011), an award-winning historical novel by Mary Bucci Bush, tells the story of Italian immigrants living in peonage on a Mississippi Delta cotton plantation in the early 1900s. It was inspired by the experiences of Bush's grandmother, Pasquina Fratini Galavotti, who worked on the Sunnyside Plantation in Arkansas as a child.

== Plot ==
Two families develop an uneasy friendship while eking out a living on a cotton plantation named Sweet Hope. The Pascalas are Italian immigrants working as indentured laborers; the Halls are African-American sharecroppers. Like the other workers at Sweet Hope, the Pascalas and the Halls face disease, poverty, and a dangerous manager. The black sharecroppers help the Italians learn English and survive in an unfamiliar climate.

The Pascalas are paid in company scrip and forbidden to leave the plantation until their debt is worked off. Having arrived too late in the year to start a crop, they keep falling further into debt. After attempting to negotiate with management for better conditions, the Italians organize against the plantation company. When the sharecroppers stand up for the Italians, it triggers "a tragic chain of events that implicates individuals, families, company, town, and the justice system."

== Background ==
In the late 1800s and early 1900s, thousands of Italians were lured to the American South to work on plantations and in factories, where they were often exploited. In 1907, the U.S. Department of Justice appointed Mary Grace Quackenbos to investigate complaints that workers in the South were being held in peonage. A major focus of the investigation was Sunnyside, a cotton plantation in Arkansas.

As a child, Mary Bucci Bush heard many stories about the Sunnyside plantation from her grandmother and great aunt, who had worked there as children. Sweet Hope was inspired by their accounts. In the 1970s, Bush began recording interviews with her grandmother. In the late 1980s she spent several weeks camping out on the Sunnyside site, interviewing survivors and descendants of plantation workers. Over the years she made several more trips to the area. On one of them, she happened to meet the historian Randolph Boehm, who was researching a biography of Quackenbos. Boehm introduced Bush to Ernesto Milani, who was researching Sunnyside from the perspective of the Italian government. The three writers shared their research and lectured together at conferences.

Although Bush is careful to note that Sweet Hope is a work of fiction, she dedicated it to "all the inhabitants of Sunnyside Plantation, Italian and African American, whose voices were never heard and whose stories were never told."

== Publication history ==
After years of research and revision, Bush spent several more years trying to find a publisher for her novel. She was told the market for historical fiction was small. Another reason, she suggested in an interview, was a lack of interest in the stories of Italian Americans other than mobsters.

The novel was published by a Canadian press, Guernica Editions, in 2011. Excerpts have appeared in literary journals such as Syracuse University Magazine (1990) and Fili D'Aquilone (in Italian, 2016); and in anthologies, including Mary Jo Bona's The Voices We Carry: Recent Italian American Women's Fiction (2007), Anthony Tamburri's From the Margin: Writings in Italian Americana (2000), Maria Mazziotti Gillan's Growing Up Ethnic in America (1999), and Terry Wolverton's HERS 2: Brilliant New Fiction by Lesbian Writers (1997).

== Reception ==
Sweet Hope won the Tillie Olsen Book Prize from the Working Class Studies Association in 2012. It was a finalist for Binghamton University's John Gardner Book Award and the 2012 Paterson Fiction Prize. In December 2012 it was the subject of a panel discussion at the annual conference of the Italian American Studies Association.

While not widely reviewed, the book has been praised by several critics. Thom Vernon of the Arkansas Review classes Sweet Hope with John Steinbeck's The Grapes of Wrath, Rebecca Harding Davis's Life in the Iron Mills, Pietro Di Donato's Christ in Concrete, and other notable works that give voice to the working poor. A reviewer in Publishers Weekly calls the book "thoroughly researched and engaging." In Italian Americana, UCLA professor Joanne Ruvoli writes, "This heartbreaking historical novel makes an important contribution to the story of Italian Americans in the United States."
