= Like Lesser Gods =

1949 novel by Mari Tomasi

- First edition cover
- Author: Mari Tomasi
- Language: English
- Genre: Fiction
- Publisher: Milwaukee: Bruce
- Publication date: 1949
- Publication place: United States
- Pages: 289
- OCLC: 414117

Like Lesser Gods is a 1949 novel by Mari Tomasi about the Italian-American stonecutters of Granitetown (a fictionalized version of Barre, Vermont), and their dedication to the work despite the danger of silicosis. Originally published by Bruce, a small Catholic press, it was republished by the New England Press in 1988 and 1999.

== Story ==
For years, Maria Dalli pleads with her husband Pietro, a granite carver, to take up a less dangerous line of work. Pietro refuses. One day at work, the boss threatens to fire Pietro's co-worker for making a mistake. Pietro tells Maria that if the boss were ever to treat him that way, he would quit.

Later, Maria finds out that Pietro has been hard at work on what he considers his masterpiece: a granite headstone in the form of a cross, "smothered" in vines. Remembering what Pietro said about quitting, she wakes in the middle of the night, slips into the shed where Pietro works, and chips away a piece of the stone. Her plan fails: when the workers arrive the next morning, it is obvious to everyone, including the boss, that Pietro's work has been deliberately sabotaged.

Pietro never suspects his wife, but Pietro's uncle, Mister Tiff, confronts her. He promises not to tell, and advises her to accept the fact that for Pietro, his work will always be paramount.

Silicosis gradually destroys Pietro's health, and he is admitted to a sanitorium, where he dies a slow death. (The sanitorium in the novel closely resembles the one on Beckley Hill in Barre that treated local granite workers.) In his final moments he imagines he is back in the shed, at work on his finest piece, the granite cross.

In The Italian American Novel, Rose Basile Green writes, "The point of Like Lesser Gods is that the work men do is their participation in the divine order of creation." According to Helen Barolini, Tomasi is also implicitly contrasting the choices available to men and women in the Dallis' culture. Pietro is entitled to put his pride of workmanship ahead of all other concerns, including family; Maria is not. Given that Tomasi produced only two novels in her lifetime, Barolini asks, "Could Tomasi have felt in her own life that, as a woman, she could not, as Pietro did, give everything to her art?"

== Characters ==
- Pietro Dalli, a granite carver from the Piedmont region of Italy
- Maria Dalli, his wife
- Mister Tiff, Pietro's uncle, who represents an "un-Americanized, old world morality."

== Publication ==
Tomasi began working on Like Lesser Gods as early as 1941. She was working for the Federal Writers' Project in Vermont at the time, interviewing granite workers and their families. This research not only informed the novel but influenced her writing style. Interviewers were advised to write straightforward, detailed prose, avoiding "flowery" or "gaudy" language; as examples, they were given excerpts from the writings of Émile Zola and from Pietro Di Donato's Christ in Concrete.

The novel grew from a short story, Stone, which first appeared in Common Ground in 1942. In 1948 Tomasi received a fellowship from Bruce, a small, Milwaukee-based Catholic publisher, which allowed her to complete the novel. It was published in 1949, and launched at a reception in New York City. It was republished by the New England Press (Shelburne, Vermont) in 1988 and 1999. An excerpt is included in Helen Barolini's The Dream Book: An Anthology of Writings by Italian American Women.

Tomasi's collection of interviews was published posthumously in 2004. That book, Men Against Granite, takes its title from a passage in Like Lesser Gods, when Pietro's doctor is preparing to deliver the bad news: "Stonecutters were all the same. Men against granite. They hated to admit defeat."

== Reception ==
Soon after its publication, Like Lesser Gods was named Book of the Month by the Catholic Literary Foundation. It was one of the few works by women discussed in Rose Basile Green's pioneering study, The Italian-American Novel (1974). Green wrote, "More than a document of regional history, Miss Tomasi's book is an evocative and symbolic story, a lucid picture of America at work, a colorful weaving of the Italian ethnic experience into the American tapestry." It is considered a significant work of Italian-American literature, and is still popular in Vermont, where it was taught for decades in the local schools.
