= Mari Tomasi =

American novelist

- Born: Marie Tomasi; January 30, 1907; Montpelier, Vermont
- Died: November 10, 1965 (aged 58); Burlington, Vermont
- Education: Wheaton College; Trinity College
- Writing career
- Notable works: Deep Grow the Roots (1940); Like Lesser Gods (1949)

Mari Tomasi (1907–1965) was an American novelist who portrayed the lives of Italian immigrants in Vermont. Literature professor Thomas J. Ferraro calls her "the first significant Italian American woman novelist." Tomasi also worked as a journalist and local historian, and served a term in the Vermont House of Representatives.

== Biography ==
=== Early life and education ===
Mari Tomasi was born on January 30, 1907, in Montpelier, Vermont, the third of five children of Bartolomeo and Margarita Tomasi. Her parents were immigrants from Turin in Northern Italy who owned a grocery and cigar store in Montpelier. Tomasi was born with a disability and walked with a limp; she was taken to Burlington, Vermont, as a child for corrective surgery, which was partially successful.

Originally aspiring to practice medicine, Tomasi attended Wheaton College in Norton, Massachusetts, and Trinity College in Burlington, Vermont, but left school to work as a journalist.

=== Career ===
She wrote for newspapers and magazines, and became city editor of the Montpelier Evening Argus. She also worked for the Vermont Federal Writers' Project, interviewing the people of Barre, Vermont, about their lives during the Great Depression; the resulting collection of interviews, titled Men Against Granite, was published posthumously in 2003. One of her literary mentors at this time was Arthur Wallace Peach.

Her first novel, Deep Grow the Roots (1940), sold few copies but received positive reviews, and earned her national recognition as an emerging writer. Set in the Piedmont region of northern Italy, it depicts the tragic effect of fascist militarism on the life of two young peasants, Luigi and Nina. Tomasi had stayed in that part of Italy as a child while recovering from surgery, and had never forgotten the experience. The book received positive reviews from Dorothy Canfield Fisher, Mary Ellen Chase, and Faith Baldwin, among others. Tomasi was one of ten new novelists selected that year by the American Booksellers Association and the New York Herald Tribune to be honored at the Hotel Astor. On the strength of that novel, she also received a Bread Loaf Writers' Conference fellowship in 1941.

Writing in 1975, critic Alfred F. Rosa was unimpressed with the novel, citing problems with structure and pacing and describing the ending as "contrived." In 1999, Helen Barolini wrote that although the reviews were positive, the early reviewers, who had described the book as quaint and even pastoral, seemed to have missed the point. The story, Barolini argues, "is tougher than that."

Tomasi received another fellowship in 1948 that allowed her to finish her second novel. Like Lesser Gods (1949) depicts the hardships and dangers faced by the Italian stonecutters of Granitetown, a fictionalized version of Barre. The novel grew from a short story, Stone, first published in Common Ground in 1942. In this novel, presumably influenced by her work for the Federal Writers' Project, Tomasi shifted to a brisker, more realistic writing style. It was chosen as Book of the Month by the Catholic Literary Foundation, and was taught for many years in Vermont schools.

Although she published no more novels, Tomasi continued to write articles and short stories, and was active in the Poetry Society of Vermont. She was Associate Editor of Vermont Life for two years. She also edited the Vermont State Welfare magazine, and three volumes of Vermont: Its Government. In December 1949 she was appointed to the Vermont House of Representatives to complete the term of Fred Gleason, who had died. Her term ended in January 1951.

=== Personal life ===
Sometime after college, Tomasi changed her name to Mari (pronounced "Mary") because she thought her given name, Marie, sounded "too foreign."

Tomasi was a devout Catholic all her life. She never married, but lived at her family home at 63 Barre Street until she died of cancer on November 10, 1965. Her papers are on file with the University of Vermont.

== Works ==
- Deep Grow the Roots (1940)
- Like Lesser Gods (1949)
- Men Against Granite (2003) - published posthumously
- Vermont: Its Government (1947)

== See also ==
- List of Italian-American women writers
