= Rachel Guido deVries =

- Born: September 9, 1947 (age 77); Paterson, New Jersey, U.S.
- Occupation(s): Writer, creative writing teacher
- Website: www.kidspeak.net

Rachel Guido deVries (born September 9, 1947) is an American poet and novelist.

Her 1986 novel, Tender Warriors, depicts the struggles of an Italian-American working-class family and has been praised by critics for featuring complex lesbian characters. She has also published five books of poetry and three children's books. Her poetry, fiction, and essays have appeared in many literary journals, including Yellow Silk, the Paterson Literary Review, Rattle, Stone Canoe, and Italian Americana; and in anthologies such as Wild Dreams: The Best of Italian Americana (edited by Carol Bonomo Albright, 2009), The Milk of Almonds: Italian American Women Writers on Food and Culture (edited by Louise DeSalvo, 2002), Don't Tell Mama! The Penguin Book of Italian American Writing (edited by Gina Barreca, 2002), and The Voices We Carry: Recent Italian American Women's Fiction (edited by Mary Jo Bona, 1994).

In 1987 she received a New York Foundation for the Arts fellowship for fiction. Her first children's book, Teeny Tiny Tino's Fishing Story, won the 2008 Paterson Prize for Books for Young People, and her poetry collection, Gambler's Daughter, was a finalist for the 2002 Paterson Poetry Prize.

DeVries was born into a working-class Italian-American family in Paterson, New Jersey, on September 9, 1947. Her grandparents emigrated to the United States from Sicily and Calabria. From 1980 to 1982 she co-directed the Women's Writers Center in Cazenovia, New York, and directed the Feminist Women's Writing Workshops at Wells College. In 1984 she founded the Community Writers' Project in Syracuse, New York, and served as its director until 1995. In the 1990s she taught creative writing at Onondaga Community College. In 2009 she was a "poet in the schools" in upstate New York and taught creative writing at Syracuse University.

== Works ==
Novels:

- Tender Warriors (1986)

Poetry:

- A Woman Unknown in Her Bones (2014)
- The Brother Inside Me (2008)
- Gambler's Daughter (2001)
- How to Sing to a Dago (1996)
- An Arc of Light (1978)

Children's Books:

- The Purple Potato and Other Poems (2007)
- Ear Wax and Hockey Sticks (1995)
- Teeny Tiny Tino's Fishing Story (1978)
