= Maria Terrone =

American poet and writer

Maria Terrone (May 21, Manhattan) is an American poet and writer. She is the author of three collections of poetry: Eye to Eye (2014), A Secret Room in Fall (2006) and The Bodies We Were Loaned (2002). She has been nominated four times for a Pushcart Prize and has received the Individual Artist Initiative Award from the Queens Council on the Arts. Her poetry ranges widely in subject, including themes of history, family and contemporary urban environments.

== Life and career ==
Terrone grew up in Jackson Heights, Queens, New York, and graduated from Fordham University with a Bachelor of Arts in English. In the early years of her career, she worked as a journalist, magazine editor and in corporate communications. In 1990, she joined the City University of New York: first at Hunter College as director of public relations and, in 2003, after moving to Queens College, as Assistant Vice President for Communications. She lives in Jackson Heights with her husband, William Terrone.

Terrone's poetry has been published in many prestigious literary magazines and anthologies, such as Poetry, The Hudson Review, Ploughshares, Barrow Street, Poetry International, Notre Dame Review, Crab Orchard Review, Alfred A. Knopf Everyman's Library, Beacon Press, CavanKerry Press and The Feminist Press.

Due to her association with Queens as an author and resident, she was selected to write a narrative for The Guggenheim Museum's Transhistoria, the third edition of stillspotting nyc, a two-year multidisciplinary project that takes the Guggenheim’s Architecture and Urban Studies programming out into the streets of the city’s five boroughs.

== Works ==
=== Books of poetry ===
- Eye to Eye. Bordighera Press. 2014. ISBN 978-1-59954-070-2.
- A Secret Room in Fall. Ashland Poetry Press. 2006. ISBN 0-912592-60-5.
- The Bodies We Were Loaned. The Word Works. 2002. ISBN 0-915380-49-8.

=== Poetry chapbook ===
- American Gothic, Take 2. Finishing Line Press. 2009. ISBN 978-1-59924-426-6.

=== International publications ===
- Belgium (French): Three poems in L'Arbre a paroles magazine, a themed issue titled Les deux Sicilies
- Iran (Farsi): Featured writer - Q&A interview and translated poems in Hengam, an independent literary supplement in a widely circulating daily newspaper.

=== Poems ===
- "Ferdinandea," The Common.
- "Ghost Frescoes," Poetry.
- "After You've Saved the Bird," Verse Daily.
- "House of Juliet" and "Y2K Apocalypse," Web Del Sol Review.
- "Unmentionable," "The Passage (excerpt)," "The Glass Factory," The Clarion.

=== Anthologies ===
- "Faith" in Mary Ann B. Miller, ed. (2014). St. Peter's B-List: Contemporary Poems Inspired by the Saints. Ave Maria Press, 2014. ISBN 978-1594714740.
- "Beets" in Rachel Hadas ed. The Waiting Room Reader: Stories to Keep You Company. CavanKerry Press, (February 2013).
- "His Cassandra" in Stacey Lynn Brown and Oliver de la Paz, ed. (2012). A Face to Meet the Faces: An Anthology of Contemporary Persona Poetry. University of Akron Press, 2012. ISBN 978-1-937378-12-7.
- "The Slain Wife of the Lighthouse Keeper Speaks" in Harold Schechter and Kurt Brown, ed. (2011). Killer Verse: Poems of Murder and Mayhem. Alfred A. Knopf Everyman’s Library, 2011. ISBN 978-0-307-70093-3.
- "Rereading the History Book: Centuries XX and XXI" in John Matthias and William O'Rourke, ed. (2009). Notre Dame Review: The First Ten Years. University of Notre Dame Press, 2009. ISBN 978-0-268-03512-9.
- "Firewalking Through Autumn" in Robert Atwan, ed. (2003). The Heart of Autumn: Poems for the Season of Reflection. Beacon Press, 2003. ISBN 0-8070-6862-4.
- "Rapunzel Redux" in Jeanne Marie Beaumont and Claudia Carlson, ed. (2003). The Poets' Grimm: 20th Century Poems from Grimm Fairy Tales. Story Line Press, 2003. ISBN 1-58654-027-0.
- 10-page section titled, "What They’ll Say in a Thousand Years," consisting of a short essay and 11 poems: "Two Women Waiting," "Strawberries," "Ceres Explains the Soul of Pasta," "Uncorking the Aged Wine," "Rosemary," "Salt for Uncle Charlie," "White," "At the Knife Skills Workshop," "Beets," "Blood Oranges," and "What They’ll Say in a Thousand Years," in Louise DeSalvo and Edvige Giunta, ed. (2002). The Milk of Almonds: Italian American Women Writers on Food and Culture. The Feminist Press, 2002. ISBN 1-55861-392-7.

=== Non-fiction ===
- "A Facebook Page in Iran," Kestrel.
- "A Pilgrimage to 5 Pointz,"photo essay, The Common.
- "At Home in the New World: a Jackson Heights Native Savors Her Neighborhood," a performed narrative commissioned by The Guggenheim Museum for stillspotting nyc: Queens.
- "Desire in New Mumbai," Dispatches blog, The Common.
- "Searching for Fergus," The Briar Cliff Review.
- "Feeding Your Creative Spirit," Her Circle Ezine.

== Reviews ==
- Rain Taxi's review of American Gothic, Take 2.
- Italian Americana's review of A Secret Room in Fall and American Gothic, Take 2.
- Montserrat Review's of A Secret Room in Fall.
- Notre Dame Review's review of A Secret Room in Fall.
- Daniela Gioseffi named Terrone "the best new writer" in PEN American Center, A Secret Room in Fall.
- Fordham Magazine's review of The Bodies We Were Loaned.
- ItalianAmericanWriters.com's review of The Bodies We Were Loaned.

== Awards and honors ==
- The Robert McGovern Publication Prize, Ashland University, Ashland Poetry Press, for A Secret Room in Fall (2006).
- Elinor Benedict Prize in Poetry, Passages North
- Allen Tate Memorial Award, Wind Magazine.
- Willow Review Award in Poetry
- Individual Artist Initiative Award, Queens Council on the Arts
- Arts and Culture Award, Italian American Labor Council
