= Julia Savarese =

American novelist

Julia Savarese (born 1926) is an American writer. She was born in New York City. After graduating summa cum laude from Hunter College in 1950, she worked as an editor for various publications. Her novels include The Weak and the Strong (1952), which tells the story of an Italian-American family living in New York during the Great Depression, and Final Proof (1971), a novel about the death of a publishing empire. She published several plays and received a Ford Foundation grant for playwriting. She also wrote for television, and in 1968 received the Hallmark Television Award.

The Weak and the Strong was one of the earliest novels about growing up as the daughter of Italian immigrants; it defied the stereotypes of "happy-go-lucky" Italian family life. When it was first published, critics called it "bleak," "unrelenting," and "humorless." In The Dream Book: An Anthology of Writings by Italian American Women (1985), Helen Barolini suggests that this was largely due to critics' expectations of Italian-American writers, and of women in particular; for a male writer such as Pietro di Donato, or an established woman writer such as Flannery O'Connor, she writes, "that kind of unsentimentality would be verismo of the highest order." In 1974, Savarese was one of the few women included in Rose Basile Green's pioneering study of Italian-American writers.
