= Michelle Reale =

American poet

Michelle (Messina) Reale (January 31, Ambler, Pennsylvania) is an Italian-American poet, academic and ethnographer.

Reale is a full professor at Arcadia University in Glenside, Pennsylvania. She uses poetic inquiry to present her research among African refugees in Sicily and her poetry is mainly concerned with Italian-American life, ethnic identity, histories, family dynamics and remembrance and forgetting. Among master's degrees in English and library and information science, she has an MFA in creative writing with a concentration in poetry. She has twice been nominated for a Pushcart Prize.

== Books ==
Poetry

- Season of Subtraction (Bordighera Press, 2019)
- All These Things Were Real: Poems of Delirium Tremens (West Philly Press, 2017)
- Birds of Sicily (Aldrich Press, 2016)
- The Legacy of the Sidelong Glance: Elegies (Aldrich Press, 2014)
- Natural Habitat (Burning River, 2011)
- Like Lungfish Getting Through the Dry Season (Thunderclap Press, 2012)
- If All They Had Were Their Bodies (Burning River, 2013)
- This is Not a Situation in Which You Should Remain Calm (Cervena Barva Press, 2014)

Academic

- Mentoring and Managing Students in the Academic Library (ALA Editions, 2012)
- Becoming an Embedded Librarian (ALA Editions, 2015)
