= Stones in Water =

1997 young adult novel by Donna Jo Napoli

- First edition (publ. Scholastic)
- Author: Donna Jo Napoli
- Language: English
- Publication date: 1997

Stones in Water is a 1997 young adult novel written by Donna Jo Napoli. It is set during World War II and tells the story of two Italian boys, one of whom is Jewish, who are sent to a work camp. Their struggle to survive, hide the Jewish boy's ethnicity, and the defeat of one and escape of another is chronicled.

== Reviews ==
Publishers Weekly's starred review called the book a "gripping" and "meticulously researched book" that "gently leads readers through a gradual unfolding of events until they come face-to-face with the scope of the war's atrocities". Kirkus Reviews similarly cited the "riveting" plot and the wartime setting.

== Awards ==
The book won the Golden Kite Award for fiction and the Sydney Taylor Book Award for older readers in 1998.

== Plot ==
The story begins with a young Venetian boy named Memo asking his friend Roberto if he wants to see an American Western movie. Roberto accepts, and their Jewish friend Samuele is also invited, and accepts. They decide to meet at a bridge in their town, and walk to the movie theater. As Roberto is getting ready, he is discovered by his brother, Sergio, and Sergio decided to accompany Roberto to the movie theater. When Sergio and Roberto get to the bridge, Sergio is angered that they are bringing someone who is Jewish. Sergio decides to take off Samuele's Star of David band and decides that they will walk in two groups, one with Memo and Roberto, and one with Sergio and Samuele, in order to not raise suspicion. They get to the movie theater without arising suspicion, and get seated. Soon after the movie starts, the Nazi army storms the theater. The movie goers are split into groups based on age and filed into trains heading North to an unknown destination. The train stops many times, each time, gathering more Italian boys. These boys speculate over where they are going. During this Samuele gets up, followed by Memo and Roberto. Memo motions to go to the bathroom, and the boys file into the bathroom. Samuele reveals he was going to leave the train, which Memo thinks is a bad idea. Roberto notes if Samuele's circumcision is discovered, Samuele will be caught breaking the law as a Jew. The boys decide to nickname Samuele, Enzo, so that he can have a more Catholic-sounding name, and Roberto gives Samuele his St. Christopher medal. The boys are taken to a labor camp, where they work on an airstrip. They are fed bread and sausage and cheese, and if they are the first to find the body they strip dead boys for warmer clothing. One boy finds out Enzo is Jewish and blackmails Enzo for more food. They continue to live like this until Enzo is beaten to death over a pair of German boots and Roberto decides to escape the camp to safety. He finds an Italian soldier and together they ride down a river to safety.
