= Rose Romano =

American poet and editor

- Born: 1951 (age 74–75); Brooklyn, New York
- Writing career
- Genres: poetry, fiction, essays
- Notable works: Vendetta (1992); The Wop Factor (1994); La bella figura: a choice (1994); You'll never have me like you want me (2016); Neither Seen nor Heard (2016); Beyond the Leash (2017); In braccio alla mamma (2019)

Rose Romano (born 1951) is an Italian-American poet, novelist, essayist, and editor. She founded and edited the journal la bella figura, which promoted the work of Italian-Americans. After a brief but successful run, she folded the journal when she decided to live in Italy. Before leaving the United States, she edited an anthology of poems that had appeared in the journal. She is the author of several novels and volumes of poetry, and her poems have appeared in numerous journals and anthologies.

== Life ==
Romano was born in Brooklyn in 1951. She began writing novels at the age of eight and poetry at the age of 14. As the grandchild of immigrants from Naples and Sicily, she often writes on Italian-American themes, and on the intersection of Italian-American and sexual identities. She has been living in Italy since 2003.

Her first two books, Vendetta (1992) and The Wop Factor (1994), have been widely used in women's literature and multicultural studies courses. As the editor of malafemmina press, she has published chapbooks by a number of Italian-American women poets. In 1988, as Italian-American literature experienced something of a "renaissance," Romano reasoned that perhaps Italian Americans had finally become "American enough that we can afford to be Italian." Through her poetry and editing, Romano became a key figure in the newly developing field of Italian-American lesbian and feminist writing. She was the first Italian-American lesbian to present papers to the American Italian Historical Association that spoke of her experiences as an Italian-American lesbian. She has published three novels, You'll never have me like you want me (2016), Beyond the Leash (2017), and In braccio alla mamma (2019), several books of poetry, including Neither Seen nor Heard (2016).

== Works ==
- Vendetta malafemmina press, 1992. OCLC 24317257
- La Bella Figura 1988-1992: A Choice malafemmina press, 1993. OCLC 779967655
- The Wop Factor malafemmina Press, 1994. OCLC 779967653
- Neither Seen Nor Heard malafemmina press, 2016. ISBN 9791220010610
- You'll Never Have Me Like You Want Me malafemmina press, 2016. ISBN 9791220009928
- Beyond the Leash malafemmina press, 2017. ISBN 9791220017633
- In braccio alla mamma malafemmina press, 2019. ISBN 9791220042420
