= Victoria Lancelotta =

- Born: Baltimore, Maryland
- Education: University of Florida

Victoria Lancelotta is an editor for the Georgetown Review. Lancelotta has written three works of fiction. Her fiction has also appeared in Glimmer Train, The Threepenny Review, the Mississippi Review Web, and other magazines. She has been a resident of the MacDowell Colony and the Djerassi Resident Artists' Program and was a visiting scholar at the 1997 Bread Loaf Writers' Conference.

She received her Master of Fine Arts from the University of Florida in 1994, and she won the Heinfield Transatlantic Award.

== Bibliography ==
=== Novels ===
- Ways to Disappear (2023)
- Far (2003)
- Here in the World (2000)

=== Published stories ===
- Practice (The Southern Review, Vol. 46.4, 2010.)
- The Anniversary Trip (The Gettysburg Review, 2008)
