= Joseph Rocchietti =

American novelist

Joseph Rocchietti was an Italian-American novelist.

A native of Casale Monferrato in Piedmont, he emigrated to the United States in 1831. He was active as a writer there during the years 1835–1875 and is best known for Lorenzo and Oonalaska (1835), which is the earliest known novel by an Italian-American. This epistolary novel, a love story written in English, is set partly in Europe and partly in Virginia.

He also published a number of long essays including one against the Massachusetts ‘nativist’ movement which was reviewed by Edgar Allan Poe in Poe's Broadway Journal.

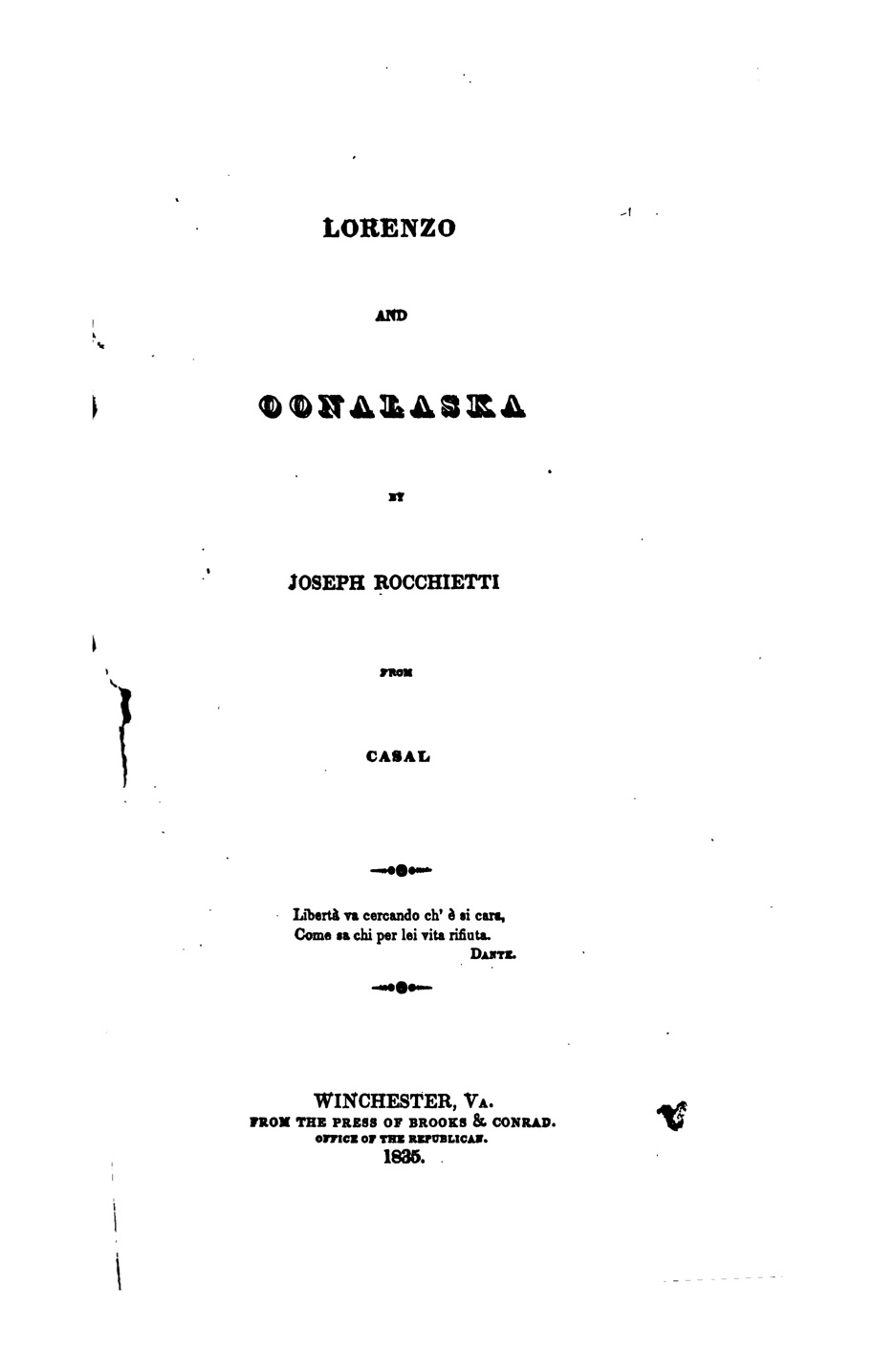
First edition title page of Lorenzo and Oonalaska (1835)
