= Dorothy Bryant =

American dramatist

- Born: 1930; San Francisco, California, U.S.
- Died: December 21, 2017 (aged 86–87); Oakland, California, U.S.
- Occupations: Writer, playwright
- Writing career
- Movement: Feminism
- Website: dorothybryantwriter.com/index.html

Dorothy Bryant (1930–2017) was an American novelist, playwright, essayist and feminist writer.

Bryant was known for her mystical, feminist and fantastic novels and plays that traverse the space between the real world and her character's inner psyche or soul. Her book The Kin of Ata Are Waiting for You was described by Alice Walker as "One of my favorite books in all the world."

== Personal and professional life ==
Dorothy Bryant was born in San Francisco in 1930, second daughter of Joe and Giuditta Calvetti, both born in Balangero, a factory town near Turin, Italy, and brought to the United States as children. Bryant became the first in her family to graduate from college, and she earned her living teaching (high school and college) until 1976. She began writing in 1960 and published a dozen books of fiction and non-fiction. Her plays have been performed in the Bay Area and beyond. In the 1995 essay "This Quiet Hall", published in Peter Booth Wiley's history of the San Francisco Public Library, she recalled walking up 24th Street to the Mission Branch Library as a child and wrote that the branch figures prominently in the settings of two of her novels.

== Works ==
=== Fiction ===
- Ella Price's Journal (1972, J. B. Lippincott, reprinted 1973 by Signet Books)
- The Kin of Ata Are Waiting for You (1976)
- Miss Giardino (1976)
- The Garden of Eros (1979)
- Prisoners (1980)
- Killing Wonder (1981)
- A Day in San Francisco (1983)
- Confessions of Madame Psyche (1986) (American Book Award winner 1987)
- The Test (1991)
- Anita, Anita (1994)
- The Berkeley Pit (2007)

=== Non-fiction ===
- Writing a Novel (1978)
- Myths to Lie By (1984)
- Literary Lynching: When Readers Censor Writers (online)

=== Plays ===
- Dear Master (1991)
- Tea with Mister Hardy (1992)
- The Panel (1994)
- Posting for Gaugain (1997)
- The Trial of Cornelia Connelly (2003)
- Sad But Glorious Days (2003)
- Eros in Love (2006)
