= Daughter of Venice =

2002 novel by Donna Jo Napoli

- First edition
- Author: Donna Jo Napoli
- Language: English
- Genre: Young adult historical Fiction
- Publisher: Wendy Lamb Books
- Publication date: 2002
- Publication place: United States
- Media type: Print Paperback)
- Pages: 271 pp

Daughter of Venice is an historical fiction/young adult novel, published in 2002 by Random House Inc.

== Plot summary ==
This story follows Donata Mocenigo, the daughter of a wealthy noble in 1592.

Donata leads a life of privilege. But constrained by strict rules of etiquette, she longs to throw off her veil and wander freely around the city she can see only from her balcony. So Donata comes up with a plan to escape the palazzo and explore — a plan that will change her own and her family's lives forever.

Donata and her sisters dress her up as a poor boy who can wander the city freely — Donata's twin sister, Laura, taking her place around the household. On her first visit outside her palazzo, she injures her foot, wanders into the Jewish Ghetto, and meets a young man called Noé, who helps her and gives her a pair of shoes. In return, she must work off the debt to him at a printers' workshop, copying out handbills.

Donata does so for a month, getting closer to Noé. Meanwhile, at home, she and Laura persuade their father to allow them to join their brothers in tutorials. Donata begins learning to read and write and learns about architecture, business, and history. Laura, however, is less interested, and quits tutorials after a short time.

Donata and Laura are the second and third daughters in their family, and only the first (and sometimes second) daughter normally marries. But both of them hope to find husbands instead of being sent to convents like their younger sisters, Maria and Paolina. However, during a dinnertime discussion, Donata's father announces that he has found not one but two husbands — one for their older sister Andriana and one for Donata, who has been selected partly because she is so hardworking. However, since it is Laura who has been working hard in her stead while she wanders around Venice, she feels horribly guilty and decides that she cannot get married, partly from loyalty to Laura and partly because she is falling in love with Noé.

Eventually, she comes up with a plan: She writes a denunciation of herself, claiming that she has converted to Judaism, so that she will be withdrawn from the betrothal after the scandal and Laura can take her place. In the process, her family discovers that she has been leaving the palazzo alone, but the plan succeeds. Donata has no idea what her future will hold, but eventually her father reveals that her tutor, Messer Zonico, has gone to the University of Padua to persuade them to allow her to take up the doctorate course in philosophy. Donata is overjoyed and hopes someday to become a tutor, like the one she admires, to other noble girls.

== Reception ==
Kirkus Reviews described Daughter of Venice as "compelling historical fiction", noting "fascinating tidbits of information about Venice’s society, politics, history, and economy find their way painlessly into the narrative" and concluding that "while readers will be rightly skeptical at Donata’s speedy mastery of not only written Venetian but Latin as well, they will nevertheless find themselves absorbed in her story and the snapshot of her city that it provides."

Publishers Weekly wrote, "Eschewing a traditional romance, Napoli forges a plot with contemporary elements" and "Enjoying the tour of historical Venice and the taste of its complex society and government, readers may not mind Donata's seeming immunity to the mores and prejudices of her day..."
