= The Smile (novel) =

2008 book by Donna Jo Napoli

- First edition (publ. Dutton Juvenile)
- Author: Donna Jo Napoli
- Language: English
- Publication date: 2008

The Smile (2008) is a Young Adult novel by Donna Jo Napoli that details a slice of the life of Monna Elisabetta, better known as the Mona Lisa. Some historical figures enter the plot, including Leonardo da Vinci and members of the famous Medici family. Set in Renaissance Florence, it follows Elisabetta's life up to the moment she models for da Vinci's painting, Mona Lisa, and suggests the secret behind her famous smile.

== Plot ==
As a budding only daughter of a wealthy silk merchant in Renaissance Italy, Elisabetta finds herself on the brink of an inevitable arranged marriage, but she longs for love. When she attends the funeral of one of Florence's most powerful men, Lorenzo de' Medici, she meets Leonardo da Vinci, who declares that one day, when she is ready, he will paint her. He introduces her to the son of Lorenzo, Giuliano de Medici, who nicknames her "Mona Lisa" and is responsible for bringing out her famous smile. Through brief encounters with Giuliano, Elisabetta falls in love; but when her mother dies and her father quickly remarries, it is arranged that she marry the new wife's brother-in-law. She must choose between love and duty, and learns that happy moments can come out of the ruined ashes of misfortune.

== Main characters ==
- Monna Elisabetta – is the protagonist of the tale. The story depicts her transformation into the woman with the mysterious smile and many secrets painted by Leonardo da Vinci. In the beginning of the novel Elisabetta acts as a noble young lady should: planning parties and preparing for marriage. However, right from the first line the reader learns that Elisabetta does not always do as she is expected. She enjoys spending time in the woods, but knows that times like that will not last after she enters society as a young woman ready to seek a husband. After her mother dies she becomes a hard worker dedicated to her family. She learns that sacrifices must be made for the greater good.
- Giuliano de Medici – is a member of the Medici family, a historically prevalent family in Florence during the time of the Renaissance. After being introduced by Leonardo da Vinci himself, he falls in love with Elisabetta. Chaos surrounds Florence, pulling the lovers apart, sending Giuliano into exile and Elisabetta onto the path of an arranged marriage. His influence over her transforms her sense of noble Renaissance woman into something passionate, creating the smile captured by Leonardo.
- Mamma – Elisabetta's mother had a great impact on her life. Her sudden death becomes the driving force for many of Elisabetta's actions in response to how a Florence woman should act.
- Papa – Elisabetta's father remarries soon after her mother's death causing turmoil between the two characters. He arranges Elisabetta's marriage later in the novel.
- Caterina – becomes Elisabetta's stepmother. She is nineteen years old when she becomes betrothed to Papa, near Elisabetta's age, thirteen. An estranged relationship ensues at first, but soon the girls accept their new family ties. When her sister passes away, it opens up the idea for an arranged marriage between Elisabetta and Caterina's brother-in-law.
- Francesco – is brother-in-law of Caterina and eventual betrothed of Elisabetta. Francesco is twice widowed by childbirth, despite that he has one son: Barolomeo.
- Bartolomeo – is the young son of Francesco. Elisabetta's love for him causes Francesco to take notice of her and request her as his wife.
- Leonardo da Vinci – While he is not part of the overall plot of the novel, he is the reason for its creation. The last scene of the book depicts the conclusion of his painting, which the reader knows will become one of the most popular paintings in the world.

== Inspirations and history ==
The Medici Family' The House of Medici came to power in the 13th century. Cosimo de' Medici's rise to power is credited for bringing the Renaissance to Florence through support of the arts and humanities. Although there is much history of the ruling family, Napoli does not touch on much of it. Giuliano relays to Elisabetta that he must flee, however, history has much more to say on the matter. Piero de Medici, the head of the family at the time of the novel, met with Charles VIII of France to negotiate for Florence without informing the signoria, or the Florentine government. He agreed for the French to take possession of several castles that would aid them in their conflict with Naples, a recent ally of Florence. When the signoria found out about Piero's personal diplomacy, they called a mob to ransack the Medici Palace, causing Piero and his two brothers, Giuliano being one of them, to flee. This information added tension of Napoli's story and Giuliano's disappearance gave cause to her half-smile.

The Mona Lisa The Smile refers to the woman depicted in Leonardo da Vinci's painting. Several questions surround the mysterious painting, focusing most pointedly at the debate over who the true muse was or whether she was merely an invention of da Vinci's imagination. Napoli took the most proposed muse, Lisa Gherardini and her known husband, Francesco del Giocondo, and created a story for them based on life in Florence in the late 15th century to early 16th century. Although it is unknown who the sitter truly was, it is known for fact that the painting was created in Florence, Italy between the years 1503–1506.

In August, 2013, Researchers opened a tomb in Florence they believe may hold the remains of Lisa Gheradini. By comparing the DNA from the remains in the tomb with those of her son, the researchers hope to solidify her remains as Lisa Gheradini before creating a reconstruction of her face based on the skeletal remains. The centuries-old question may finally be close to an answer. It is the mystery that surrounds the identity of the Mona Lisa that gave rise to the creation of Napoli's novel.

== Reception ==
Kirkus praised the novel by writing "[t]hrough this deeply personal story, Napoli paints a magnificent and mournful portrait of the Italian Renaissance, both tragic and triumphant."

Publishers Weekly also commended the book by focusing on its history and stated: "the romantic tragedy and redemption will prompt a closer inspection of Leonardo's masterpiece."
