= The Kin of Ata Are Waiting for You =

1971 novel by Dorothy Bryant

- 1976 McGraw-Hill edition
- Author: Dorothy Bryant
- Cover artist: Edidt Geever (above)
- Genre: Philosophical fiction, psychological fiction
- Published: 1971 (1971 as The Comforter: A Mystical Fantasy)
- Pages: 220
- ISBN: 978-0-394-73292-3
- OCLC: 466371168

The Kin of Ata are Waiting for You (1971) is a novel by American writer Dorothy Bryant. It deals with the idea of how the negation of dreams as a guide to life affects the real world. Author Alice Walker has described it as "one of my favorite books in all the world".

The book has been cited in a number of academic articles and text-books in the fields of philosophy, psychology, and law.

The book was first published as a novella by Evan Press in 1971, under the title The Comforter: A Mystical Fantasy. Although it was initially rejected by major publishing houses, despite the success of the author's first novel, its publication led to the inception of Bryant's private publishing business, the Ata Press. Kin was subsequently picked up for publication by Random House, a major publisher, and has remained in print for over 30 years. The novel has a cult following among feminists, psychologists, and teachers of religious studies.

== Plot summary ==
After murdering a lover, and crashing his car while fleeing the scene of the crime, a ruthlessly "successful" man is transported to an unknown island (called Ata) whose location is never revealed, the implication being that it doesn't physically exist in our world. The island is inhabited by people he gradually learns are deceptively primitive. Every aspect of their waking lives is governed by their dream life. Initially in conflict with their ways, the unnamed protagonist, according to Bryant, "is dragged kicking and screaming to his own salvation." He gradually comes to realize that the people of this island support and maintain the real world through their dreaming, and that he needs to incorporate this world view so he can successfully return to his former life. It can be read as an allegory of spiritual growth, and shows the influence of modern anthropological writings on indigenous peoples and the writings of psychologist Carl Jung.

== Reception ==
Spider Robinson praised the novel as "a deeply spiritually rewarding book" featuring "some of the cleanest, sparest, simplest prose I've seen all year."
