= Hush: An Irish Princess' Tale =

2007 novel by Donna Jo Napoli

- Author: Donna Jo Napoli
- Language: English
- Genre: Historical Fiction novel YA novel
- Publisher: Atheneum (Simon & Schuster)
- Publication date: 2007
- Publication place: United States
- Media type: (Hardback & Paperback)
- Pages: 308 pp
- ISBN: 0-689-86176-1

Hush: An Irish Princess' Tale is a 2007 young adult novel written by Donna Jo Napoli. It appears in numerous school and public library reading lists. The book depicts the world of the slave trade around the year 900 in Ireland.

== Plot ==
Set in c. 900 in Ireland, where kings are constantly fighting over land, fifteen-year-old Melkorka is the eldest daughter of an Irish king. As a princess, Melkorka has lived a life of luxury made possible through slave labor. However, her younger brother, destined to be king, is injured by Norse men in Dublin, forcing Melkorka and her sister Brigid to go into hiding to protect themselves from the approaching battle.

While fleeing their kingdom, Melkorka and Brigid are captured by slave traders. While Brigid immediately escapes, Melkorka does not and is transported throughout Europe. Refusing to speak to her captors, Melkorka gains power and well-being through her silence, which at times intrigues, frightens, and frustrates her captors. However, it is not enough to protect her from being sold as a concubine to a wealthy Icelandic lord named Hoskuld. Hush ends on a semi-positive note where Melkorka resolves to speak to her unborn son to teach him about her homeland.

== Characters ==
- Melkorka is the beautiful fifteen-year-old daughter of a wealthy Irish king, Myrkjartan. Proud and having lived a sheltered life of privilege, she is unprepared when she and her sister are suddenly abducted by slave traders. In response, she takes a personal vow of silence no matter what happens to her, causing her to become an object of fascination to her captors, who think she might be an enchantress. Melkorka's silence protects her from being sold until she catches the eye of a wealthy Icelandic chieftain, Hoskuld, who buys her as a concubine. Although Melkorka initially hates and fears him, he is kind to her, and over the course of the story, Melkorka learns to love him. When Melkorka learns she is pregnant, she resolves to speak to her child, and decides to accept her fate in Iceland.
- Brigid is Melkorka's younger sister, who is more perceptive and daring than Melkorka. She teaches Melkorka that for an animal to trust you, you must be silent. "Hush," she says. This is what gives Melkorka the idea to be silent towards her captors, for they are animals. Brigid is captured alongside Melkorka, although using her wits, she is able to escape at one point. However, her fate afterward is unknown - Melkorka does not learn what became of her sister by the end of the book. Napoli's companion novel, Hidden, follows Brigid's story, based on the legend of Norse pirate queen Alfhild, as she attempts to find and rescue Melkorka.
- Maeve is an Irish slave on the ship that Melkorka and Brigid are brought abroad when they are abducted. Melkorka believes her to be mad, as Maeve refuses to comply with her captors and fiercely endures against punishments in order to protect herself. However, Melkorka realizes over time that Maeve has been sold multiple times, gaining a great deal of knowledge of the world beyond Ireland. An astute woman, she advises Melkorka to maintain her silence, as it gives her a measure of protection by intriguing and frightening her captors.
- Clay Man is the head slave merchant, who captured Melkorka and Maeve. Melkorka's absolute silence frightens and intrigues him, especially after his repeated attempts to force a sound from her fail. However, his uncertainty around her is why he does not sell her after a number of his other slaves are sold and he sets a high price on her, despite her apparent muteness, when Hoskuld expresses an interest in her. His true name is Gilli, though Melkorka does not learn his name until she is sold to Hoskuld and knows him as "Clay Man" because of the clay marking his body and clothing from the weights he creates for payment.
- Thora is a Norse slave owned by Clay Man. She becomes Melkorka's guide after Maeve and the other slaves on Clay Man's ship are sold. Melkorka soon regards her a friend and is broken-hearted at the thought of separating from her after she is purchased by Hoskuld.
- Hoskuld is a wealthy Icelandic chieftain with long red fiery hair, who is twice the age of Melkorka and is quite large. He has a wife and family at home and buys Melkorka as a concubine. He treats her lovingly, finding her to be an endless source of fascination, but is unable to interpret her silence.

== Historical note ==
At the end of the novel, it is revealed in a note by the author that the story is based on the legend of Melkorka, the mother of the Icelandic gothi Olaf Hoskuldsson. According to myth and tradition, his mother was a slave assumed to be mute. One day the king overhears her speaking in Gaelic and she discloses that she was a kidnapped Irish princess.

== Reception ==
Kirkus Reviews writes "As always, Napoli is a spellbinding storyteller, her prose rich in details both tender and blood-soaked. From the texture of embroidery to the odor of sheep dung, her language is vivid, precise, cinematic" while Publishers Weekly states "Napoli does not shy from detailing practices that will make readers wince..." and "The vocabulary, much of which is specific to the setting, may challenge readers, but it's unlikely to stop them: the tension over Mel's hopes for escape paces this story like a thriller."

== Literary awards ==
- American Library Association 2009 Best Books for Young Adults
