= American Home =

Intercultural exchange center in Russia

Coordinates: 56.127°N 40.386°E

The American Home is registered with the Russian government as a "non-commercial educational institution." It provides instruction in both English and Russian and facilitates intercultural exchanges. Its main focus is its EFL program which now serves more than 500 Russian students during its fall and spring terms and more than 100 students during its 6-week intensive summer program.

== History ==
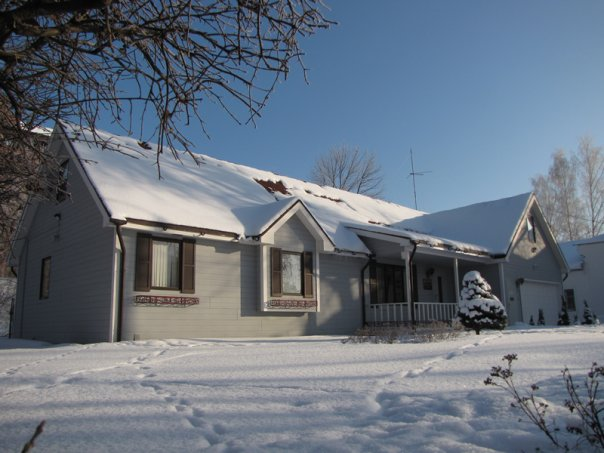
The American Home in Winter

The home was built in 1992 by Serendipity: Russian Consulting & Development, LTD - now doing business as Serendipity-Russia - to foster relations between the United States and Russia after the collapse of the Soviet Union. Dr. Ron Pope, a political science professor at Illinois State University specializing in Russian politics (now retired), organized the project to showcase American construction materials and home building techniques, with the intent of fostering investment and trade opportunities. Vladimir was selected by Dr. Pope because of its relationship to Bloomington-Normal, one of Vladimir's sister cities. The energy efficient house was designed and its construction was supervised by Illinois State University Industrial Technology professor, Dr. Ed Francis.

After construction the aims of the project changed, and the major goal of the American Home became the facilitating of intercultural communication through its language programs and educational exchanges. An effort was also made to promote community development in Vladimir and the surrounding area, with a special emphasis on tourism development.].
