= Octavia Waldo =

American novelist (1929–2011)

Octavia Cecilia Capuzzi Waldo Locke (April 25, 1929 – April 22, 2011) was an American writer and artist who was best known for her 1961 novel, A Cup of the Sun.

== Biography ==
Octavia Cecilia Capuzzi Waldo was born on April 25, 1929 in Philadelphia, Pennsylvania, the eighth child of Italian-American parents. She graduated with honors from the Tyler School of Fine Arts at Temple University, and from 1949 to 1950 was a Fulbright fellow at the American Academy in Rome. She has also been a fellow at the Bread Loaf Writers' Conference and a resident at Yaddo. Her artwork has been shown in galleries and is included in private collections; she taught art for many years in Washington D.C. Her first novel was published in 1961 under the name Octavia Waldo; other writings have appeared under the names Octavia Capuzzi and Octavia Capuzzi Locke. In A Cup of the Sun, the Italian-American female protagonist struggles "to achieve a level of autonomy unknown to her mother." Waldo's short stories and other writings have appeared in many journals and anthologies, including Helen Barolini's The Dream Book: An Anthology of Writings of Italian American Women (1985) and Don't Tell Mama: The Penguin Book of Italian American Writing (2002). Waldo died in Santa Barbara, California on April 22, 2011, at the age of 81.
