= Object Lessons (novel) =

1991 novel by Anna Quindlen

- Author: Anna Quindlen
- Language: English
- Publication date: 1991
- ISBN: 9780394569659

Object Lessons is the first novel by Pulitzer Prize-winning novelist and journalist Anna Quindlen. First published in 1991, the book is a coming-of-age story centering on 13-year-old Maggie Scanlan, the youngest child of the powerful Scanlan clan. Quindlen described it as "a young person's novel." The title is drawn from the phrase "object lesson," a teaching method.

== Plot ==
Object Lessons centers on the Scanlan family, who live in New York. The family patriarch, John Scanlan, a conservative Irish man, has amassed a considerable fortune from manufacturing religious items like communion wafers and rosaries. John's son, Tommy Scanlan, has married Connie, a caretaker of a cemetery. As Connie is Italian and otherwise an outsider, the elder Scanlan family resents the marriage. Attempting to bring Maggie's parents back into the fold, John offers Tommy a house near him in Westchester County, and the family moves there from The Bronx.

As Maggie turns 13, events transpire in Maggie and her family's life. John falls ill with a stroke and dies. Connie becomes pregnant again, and she learns to drive. Maggie becomes worried about her cousin Monica's marriage. Maggie's best friend Debbie drifts away from her, she gets her first boyfriend, and she and her friends are questioned about setting fires to a nearby development.

== Critical reception ==
Quindlen's novel was generally praised by critics from The New York Times, The Washington Post, Publishers Weekly, and Kirkus. Anne Tyler of The New York Times review praised Maggie's story and Quindlen's observations about family life, though remarking that "Quindlen shows some uncertainty as a storyteller" as a debut novelist. Publishers Weekly likened the novel to the work of Mary Gordon, calling the book "empathetic and beautifully dimensional."
