= Anna Monardo =

American novelist

- Born: Anna Mondardo; 1956 (age 69–70); Pittsburgh, Pennsylvania, U.S.
- Education: Saint Mary's College (BA); Columbia University (MFA)
- Occupations: Novelist, professor
- Children: Leo
- Writing career
- Language: English
- Years active: 1993–present
- Period: 20th century, 21st century
- Genres: Fiction, Poetry
- Subject: Italian-American culture
- Notable works: Falling In Love with Natassia, The Courtyard of Dreams
- Notable awards: Clare Woolrich Fellowship; 2004 and 2012 Nebraska Arts Council Fellowships for Creative Non-Fiction in Literature; Residency Fellowships from the Djerassi Foundation, the Corporation of Yaddo, the MacDowell Colony and the Virginia Center for the Creative Arts; 2013 Award for Distinguished Research and Creative Activity; 2013 Alumni Teaching Award
- Website: annamonardo.com

Anna Monardo (born 1956) is an American novelist of the Italian-American experience. Originally from Pittsburgh, she graduated from Saint Mary's College, Notre Dame, Indiana and received her M.F.A. from Columbia University in 1983. She is a professor of the Writer's Workshop at the University of Nebraska at Omaha.

== Books ==
- The Courtyard of Dreams (Doubleday, 1993)
- Falling In Love with Natassia (Doubleday, 2006)
