= Lucia Chiavola Birnbaum =

American feminist cultural historian

- Born: Kansas City, Missouri
- Awards: American Book Awards; 1987 Liberazione della Dona: Feminism in Italy

Academic background
- Education: University of California, Berkeley

Academic work
- Discipline: historian
- Sub-discipline: cultural history; feminism
- Institutions: Stanford University; California Institute of Integral Studies; San Francisco State University

Lucia Chiavola Birnbaum's signature (Women's library of Bologna) from the book: "Dark mothers, african Origins and Godmothers"

Lucia Chiavola Birnbaum is a Sicilian-American feminist cultural historian and professor emerita.

== Life ==
Birnbaum was born in Kansas City, Missouri. She graduated from University of California, Berkeley with a Ph.D. in 1964. She was a Clayman Institute scholar at Stanford University. She teaches at the California Institute of Integral Studies and has also taught history at San Francisco State University.

== Awards ==
- 1987 American Book Award

== Works ==
- Dark Mother: African Origins and Godmothers. iUniverse. 2002. ISBN 978-0-595-20841-8.
- Black madonnas: feminism, religion, and politics in Italy. Northeastern University Press. 1993.
- Liberazione della donne: feminism in Italy. Wesleyan University Press. 1986.

=== Editor ===
- Lucia Chiavola Birnbaum, ed. (2005). She Is Everywhere!: An Anthology of Writing in Womanist/feminist Spirituality. iUniverse. ISBN 978-0-595-34034-7.
