= Donna Jo Napoli =

American linguist and children's author (born 1948)

- Born: February 28, 1948 (age 78); Miami, Florida, U.S.
- Education: Harvard University (BS, MA, PhD)
- Occupations: Linguist, fiction writer
- Writing career
- Period: 1993–present (fiction)
- Genres: Fantasy for young people, children's books, picture books
- Website: donnajonapoli.com

Donna Jo Napoli (born February 28, 1948) is an American linguist and writer of children's and young adult fiction. She is a professor at Swarthmore College teaching linguistics, including its relationship to such subjects as Comparative Literature Studies, music, dance, and theater. She has previously taught at Smith College, the University of North Carolina at Chapel Hill, Georgetown University, the University of Michigan at Ann Arbor, and the University of Pennsylvania.

== Early life and personal life ==
Napoli was born the youngest of four children in Miami, February 28, 1948, to an Italian-American family. After correcting an eyesight problem left undiagnosed until the age of 10, Napoli became an avid reader. From then on she found solace in the escape provided by books, using reading as comfort during family troubles and instability stemming from her father's gambling problem.

Napoli has dual citizenship in the U.S. and Italy. She is married and has five children.

== Education and linguistics career ==
Napoli was accepted to Harvard University for undergraduate education and received both her B.S. (Mathematics, 1970) and M.A./Ph.D. (Romance Languages, 1973). Her PhD dissertation was titled The Two Si's of Italian: An Analysis of Reflexive, Inchoative, and Indefinite Subject Sentences in Modern Standard Italian and was published by the Indiana University Linguistics Club. A postdoctoral fellowship in linguistics at M.I.T. in 1974 led to her resulting career in the field.

Napoli began her linguistics career in generative syntax, with a focus on Italian and other Romance languages. Her subsequent work spanned many topics within generative syntax on Romance languages and English, including its interfaces with intonation, morphology, and other areas. She has worked in syntax, phonetics, phonology, morphology, historical and comparative linguistics, Romance studies, structure of American Sign Language, poetics, writing for ESL students, and mathematical and linguistic analysis of folk dance.

Her publications in linguistics include Syntactic argumentation (with Emily Rando). (Washington, DC: Georgetown Univ. Press, 1979), Syntax: Theory and Problems (Oxford: Oxford Univ. Press, 1993), Linguistics: An introduction (Oxford: Oxford Univ. Press, 1996), Humour in sign languages: The linguistic underpinnings (with Rachel Sutton-Spence) (Dublin: Trinity Press, 2009), and L'animale parlante ("The speaking animal") (2004), written with Marina Nespor, along with dozens of articles in the scholarly journals.

In 2015, she was inducted as a Fellow of the Linguistic Society of America.

== Writing career ==
Although Napoli always had a love of writing, she decided not to pursue it as a career in early life. Her professional writing career began with the publication of her first book, The Hero of Barletta, in 1988. Napoli's novels tackle real-world problems children of any age may face, including family hardships, anxiety, phobias, and illness. As explained in a 2012 TED Talk, Napoli finds it important that children read stories about real-life problems they may face, to help comfort those who are experiencing similar difficulties.

Her children's books have been translated into many languages, including different sign languages. Many of her children's books are retellings of fairy tales, including The Magic Circle, Crazy Jack, Spinners, Zel, Breath, Bound, Beast, and The Wager for older children, and The Prince of the Pond, Ugly, and Mogo the Third Warthog for younger children. Other children's stories are historical fiction based in Italy, including Daughter of Venice, For the Love of Venice, and The Smile. Napoli has won numerous awards for her work, including the Golden Kite Award given by the Society of Children’s Book Writers and Illustrators (for Stones in Water, and honor book Breath), the Sydney Taylor Award given by the Association of Jewish Libraries (for Stones in Water, and, honor book, The King of Mulberry Street and the Parents' Choice Gold Award (for Alligator Bayou and Silver awards for North and The King of Mulberry Street).

== Work with Deaf communities ==
In the early 2000s, Napoli began a program of research on sign languages and developed connections within the Deaf community. She has contributed to linguistic research on sign languages, including the publication of the book Primary movement in sign languages in 2011.

Combining her interest in language and literature, Napoli has collaborated with others to create bimodal bilingual e-books for hearing parents to read to their deaf children. These are ebooks and videos that are both conveyed in oral language, and conveyed in sign language in a video. Languages represented in this project include American Sign Language, Brazilian Sign Language, Fijian Sign Language, Korean Sign Language, Irish Sign Language, Nepali Sign Language, Swedish Sign Language, and others. The books are translated into the oral language relevant for each signed language.

== Fiction books ==
=== Young Adult novels ===
- The Magic Circle, 1993 Dutton Penguin, 1995 Puffin Books (Paperback)
- Zel, 1996 Dutton Penguin, 1998 Puffin Books (Paperback)
- Song of the Magdalene, 1996 Scholastic, 1998 (Paperback), 2004 Simon & Schuster (Paperback)
- Stones in Water, 1997, 1999 (Paperback) Dutton Penguin
- For the Love of Venice, 1998, 2000 (Paperback) Delacorte Press
- Sirena, 1998, 2000 (Paperback) Scholastic
- Spinners, 1999, 2001 (Paperback) Dutton Penguin
- Crazy Jack, 1999, 2001 (Paperback) Delacorte Press
- Beast, 2000, 2002 (Paperback) Simon & Schuster
- Daughter of Venice, 2002, 2003 (Paperback) Delacorte Press
- The Great God Pan, 2003, 2005 (Paperback) Delacorte Press
- Breath, 2003, 2005 (Paperback) Simon & Schuster
- North, 2004, 2005 (Paperback) Greenwillow
- Bound, 2004, 2006 Simon & Schuster
- The King of Mulberry Street, 2005, 2007 (Paperback) Delacorte Press
- Fire in the Hills, 2006, 2008 (Paperback) Dutton Press
- Hush: An Irish Princess' Tale, 2007, 2008 (Paperback) Simon & Schuster
- The Smile, 2008, 2009 (Paperback) Dutton Press
- Alligator Bayou, 2009, 2010 (Paperback) Random House
- The Wager, 2010, 2014 (Paperback) Henry Holt and Company
- Skin, 2013 Skyscape
- Storm, 2014 Simon & Schuster
- Hidden: An Irish Princess' Tale, 2014 Paula Wiseman Books
- Dark Shimmer, 2015 Random House

=== Elementary- and middle-school novels ===
- Soccer Shock, 1991 Dutton Penguin, 1993 Puffin Books (Paperback)
- The Prince of the Pond, 1992 Dutton Penguin, 1994 Puffin Books (Paperback)
- When the Water Closes over my Head, 1994 Dutton Penguin, 1996 Puffin Books (Paperback)
- Shark Shock, 1994 Dutton Penguin, 1997 Puffin Books (Paperback)
- The Bravest Thing, 1995 Dutton Penguin, 1997 Puffin Books (Paperback)
- Jimmy, the Pickpocket of the Palace, 1995 Dutton Penguin, 1997 Puffin Books (Paperback)
- On Guard, 1997 Dutton Penguin, 1999 Puffin Books (Paperback)
- Trouble on the Tracks, 1998 Scholastic
- Changing Tunes, 1998 Dutton Penguin, 2000 Puffin Books (Paperback)
- Shelley Shock, 2000 Dutton Penguin, 2002 Puffin Books (Paperback)
- Three Days, 2001 Dutton Penguin, 2003 Puffin Books (Paperback)
- Gracie, the Pixie of the Puddle, 2004 Dutton Penguin
- Sly the Sleuth and the Pet Mysteries, 2005 Dial Press, 2007 Scholastic (Paperback)
- Ugly, 2006, 2008 (Paperback) Hyperion Books
- Sly the Sleuth and the Sports Mysteries, 2006 Dial Press
- Sly the Sleuth and the Food Mysteries, 2007 Dial Press
- Mogo, the Third Warthog, 2008 Hyperion Books
- Sly the Sleuth and the Code Mysteries, 2009 Dial Press
- Lights On The Nile, 2011 HarperCollins
- Treasury of Greek Mythology: Classic Stories of Gods, Goddesses, Heroes & Monsters, 2011 National Geographic
- Treasury of Egyptian Mythology: Classic Stories of Gods, Goddesses, Monsters & Mortals, 2013 National Geographic
- Treasury of Norse Mythology: Stories Of Intrigue, Trickery, Love & Revenge, 2015 National Geographic
- Tales From the Arabian Nights: Stories of Adventure, Magic, Love, and Betrayal, 2016 National Geographic
- Treasury of Bible Stories, 2019 National Geographic
- Treasury of Magical Tales From Around the World, 2021 National Geographic
- Words to Make a Friend, 2021 Random House Studio

=== The Angelwings Series ===
Published by Simon & Schuster 1999-2001

- Friends Everywhere
- Little Creatures
- On Her Own
- One Leap Forward
- Give and Take
- No Fair!
- April Flowers
- Playing Games
- Lies and Lemons
- Running Away
- Know-It-All
- New Voices
- Left Out
- Happy Holidays
- Partners
- Hang In There

=== Picture books and early readers ===
- The Hero of Barletta, Illustrations by Dana Gustafson, Carolrhoda Books, 1988
- Albert, Illustrations by Jim LaMarche, Harcourt, 2001
- How Hungry are You?, Illustrations by Amy Walrod, Simon & Schuster, 2001
- Rocky, the Cat who Barks, Illustrations by Tamara Petrosino, Dutton Children's Books, 2002
- Flamingo Dream, Illustrated by Cathie Felstead, Greenwillow, 2002
- Hotel Jungle, Illustrations by Kenneth J. Spengler, Mondo Publishing 2004
- Pink Magic, Illustrations by Chad Cameron, Clarion Books, 2005
- Bobby the Bold, Illustrations by Ard Hoyt, Dial Books for Young Readers, 2006
- The Wishing Club: A Story About Fractions, Illustrations by Anna Currey, Henry Holt and Company, 2007
- Corkscrew Counts: A Story About Multiplication, Illustrations by Anna Currey, Henry Holt and Company, 2008
- Ready to Dream, Illustrations by Bronwyn Bancroft, Bloomsbury USA, 2009
- The Earth Shook: A Persian Tale Illustrations by Gabi Swiatkowska Hyperion Books, 2009
- Handy Stories to Read and Sign, Illustrations by Maureen Klusza, Gallaudet University Press, 2009
- Mama Miti: Wangari Maathai and the Trees of Kenya, Illustrations by Kadir Nelson, Simon & Schuster, 2010
- The Crossing, Illustrations by Jim Madsen, Simon & Schuster, 2011
- A Single Pearl, Illustrations by Jim LaMarche, Hyperion Books, 2013
- Hands & Hearts, Illustrations by Amy Bates, Abrams Books, 2014
- As Night Falls: Creatures That Go Wild After, Illustrations by Felicita Sala, Random House Studio, 2023

=== eBooks ===
- Hang In There, 2015
- Left Out, 2015
- Partners, 2015
- Happy Holidays, 2015
- Know-It-All, 2015
- No Fair!, 2015
- Playing Games, 2015
- April Flowers, 2015
- One Leap Forward, 2015
- Give And Take, 2015
- On Her Own, 2015
- Song Of The Magdalene, 2015
- Friends Everywhere, 2015
- Little Creatures, 2015
