= Working-Class Studies Association =

Organization in the United States

- Abbreviation: WCSA
- Established: 2004; 22 years ago
- Founders: Sherry Linkon & John Russo
- Type: Nonprofit
- Headquarters: Newfane, Vermont
- Origins: Center for Working-Class Studies & Center for Study of Working Class Life
- Methods: Conferences, publications, awards, and educational resources
- Field: Working class culture
- President: Anthony Casamassima
- Treasurer: Terry Easton
- Secretary: Carol Quirke
- Publication: Journal of Working-Class Studies
- Awards: Studs Terkel Award, Tillie Olsen Award for Creative Writing, C.L.R. James Award, Jake Ryan & Charles Sackrey Award, Russo & Linkon Award, Constance Coiner Award, Lifetime Achievement Award
- Website: workingclassassn.org

The Working-Class Studies Association (WCSA) is a non-profit association that helps develop and support scholarship, teaching, and activism related to working-class life and cultures. The WCSA was first established by the Youngstown State University's former Center for Working-Class Studies in 2003, supported by a grant from the Ford Foundation. Members are located in countries across the globe, and they include poets, scholars, activists, teachers, students, journalists, artists, small press publishers, and others interested in building the field of working-class studies.

The association holds an annual conference and other events, promotes the field through a variety of awards, and publishes The Journal of Working-Class Studies.

== History ==
The origins of the Working-Class Studies Association can be traced to the Center for Working-Class Studies at Youngstown State University in Ohio and the Center for Study of Working Class Life at Stony Brook University. A complementary series of biennial conferences sponsored by these centers fostered a community of scholars, activists, artists, publishers, and journalists invested in the study of and advocacy for working-class life, culture and interests.

The Youngstown Center for Working-Class Studies (CWCS) was the first multi-disciplinary academic center in the US devoted to the study of working-class culture broadly defined. What distinguished the center was an interdisciplinary approach to the study of working-class issues. The center was launched in 1996 after a group of Youngstown faculty organized two interdisciplinary conferences in the early 1990s, one on the 1930s and the next on working-class studies, and received a grant from the Association of American Colleges and Universities to explore the category of class as part of a broader project promoting diversity on college campuses. Under the leadership of co-founders Sherry Linkon and John Russo, the center supported a range of activities promoting awareness of and respect for working-class life and culture, including an educational program in collaboration with Local 1375 of the United Steelworkers that brought college classes to the union hall. This work, in addition to continuing biennial conferences on working-class studies, was further supported by two grants from the Ford Foundation starting in 2000.

The Center for Study of Working Class Life was established in 1999 at Stony Brook University under the leadership of economist Michael Zweig. Like the Youngstown center, The Center for Study of Working Class Life took an interdisciplinary approach to investigating the meaning of class in contemporary society, although with a stronger emphasis on “tools of the social sciences.” Starting in 2002, their How Class Works conference became the biennial complement to the Youngstown center’s working-class studies conference. The Youngstown conference met every other odd year, and How Class Works met every other even year, multiplying opportunities for cross-disciplinary interaction and collaboration.

The Working-Class Studies Association began to develop in early 2003 in the course of planning that year’s Youngstown conference. In April 2004, Linkon and John Russo met with 15 participants to develop a mission statement, map out the structure of the organization, and work through organizing issues. The group included academics and graduate students from multiple fields as well as independent scholars and labor educators.

The organization held a founding meeting at Stony Brook in June 2004, setting the stage for its first official business meeting at Youngstown in May 2005. The constitution and a slate of candidates for the steering committee were presented at this meeting. Membership received ballots in June and subsequently approved the constitution and first steering committee of the WCSA. The initial slate of officers included Sherry Linkon (President), Peter Rachleff (President-Elect), Jamie Daniel (Secretary) and Michael Zweig (Treasurer). At-large members of the first steering committee were Tim Strangleman, Michele Fazio, Mary Romero, and Andrew Ross.

The WCSA took responsibility for organizing odd-year conferences beginning in 2007, working with host committees at welcoming universities and colleges: Macalaster College, University of Pittsburgh, University of Illinois at Chicago, University of Wisconsin-Madison, Georgetown University, and Indiana University Bloomington. Beginning with the 2018 conference, the WCSA assumed responsibility for even-year conferences as well, beginning with Stony Brook University.

== Publications ==
The WCSA publishes The Journal of Working-Class Studies, an online, open access peer reviewed journal (ISSN 2475-4765). New issues come out twice yearly. The inaugural issue was December 2016. The journal is co-edited by Sarah Attfield and Liz Giuffre; Christie Launius is the reviews editor.

From 2006-2017, the association published a semi-annual newsletter, Working-Class Notes. It provided information about the organization, reports from officers, news and notes about members’ activities, and book reviews. This newsletter was a continuation of a newsletter by the same name published by the Center for Working-Class Studies at Youngstown State University (YSU) from 1998-2006.

As of the fall of 2017 issue, Working-Class Notes ceased publication as its own entity. Most of the elements of the newsletter—a section called “Book Notes,” member news, the President’s letter, officer reports, and reports from affiliated centers—became available on the WCSA website. Lengthier book reviews, which had been a highlight of Working-Class Notes, moved to The Journal of Working-Class Studies.

Working-Class Notes was initially produced by the Center for Working-Class Studies at YSU. It became a WCSA publication in 2006. It was edited by Karen Lynn Ford 2004-2005, Sherry Linkon from 2005-2010, and by Christie Launius from 2010-2017.

The Book Notes section has been edited by Jack Metzgar from 2007 to the present. In 2016, Cherie Madigan began editing the fiction and poetry notices while Metzgar continues editing nonfiction.

== Conferences ==
The Working-Class Studies Association and its Working-Class Academics section hold annual WCSA Conferences. In 2025, the conference will be at University of Technology Sydney, in 2024 it was held at SUNY Old Westbury in New York, in 2023 at University of Illinois, Chicago, in 2022 at Oregon State University, in 2021 on Zoom and Youngstown State University, and in 2019 at Kent University in England. In the group's early years, its conferences were held first in Ohio.

The WCSA grew out of biennial conferences organized by the Center for Working-Class Studies at Youngstown State University starting in 1995 and, beginning in 2002, How Class Works, a biennial conference sponsored by The Center for Study of Working-Class Life at the State University of New York at Stony Brook.

Since its inception in 2004 the WCSA has sponsored and co-sponsored conferences biennially, and starting in 2018, annually. From 2006-2016 the association met biennially at How Class Works conferences in even numbered years.

In 2007 the WCSA started sponsoring odd-year biennial conferences by presenting Working-Class Culture and Counter Culture at Macalester College. In 2009, the University of Pittsburgh hosted the WCSA’s Class Matters conference. In 2011, the Chicago Working-Class Studies affiliate of the WCSA presented Working Class Organization and Power at the University of Illinois-Chicago.

Fighting Forward: A Labor and Working-Class Summit was held at Madison College’s downtown campus in 2013. This conference was co-sponsored with the Labor and Working-Class Studies Project, a collaborative campus-labor-community initiative based at the University of Wisconsin-Madison. In 2015, WCSA co-sponsored Fighting Inequality with the Labor and Working-Class History Association at Georgetown University. The 2017 conference was hosted by Indiana University Bloomington.

After 2017, the WCSA began sponsoring conferences annually, beginning with Class at the Border: Migration, Confinement, and (Im)mobility, hosted by The Center for the Study of Inequalities, Social Justice and Policy at Stony Brook. Conference programs from 2001 to the present are archived on the WCSA website.

== Awards ==
The WCSA Awards include the Tillie Olsen Award for creative writing, which honors published books of poetry, fiction, creative non-fiction, and other genres; the C.L.R. James Award for published books for academic or general Audiences; the Russo & Linkon Award for published article or essay for academic or general audiences; the Studs Terkel Award for media and journalism; the Jake Ryan and Charles Sackrey Award: for books by writer(s) of working-class origins that speak to issues of the working-class experience in academia, and the Constance Coiner Award for best dissertation. There is also a Lifetime Achievement Award given periodically for significant service and contributions to the field. Press releases are issued about the awards and announced through social media, awardees are archived on WCSA's website, and they are given and celebrated each year at the annual conference.

== Organization ==
Anyone may become a member of WCSA. The administration of WCSA is conducted by the Executive Committee, which is elected by the members. Elections are conducted by the Election Committee. The Executive Committee consists of the president, the president-elect, the immediate past-president, the secretary, and the treasurer in addition to four at-large members and the chair of the Working-Class Academics section.

The current president is Sarah Attfield (University of Technology, Sydney). Past-president is Jen Vernon (Sierra College, California) and president-elect is Jeffrey Cabusao (Bryant University, Rhode Island).

== Archives ==
Michael Zweig, professor emeritus and former director of the Center for Study of Working Class Life at the State University of New York at Stony Brook, has arranged for archival materials documenting the founding of the WCSA to be housed at the Tamiment Library and Robert F. Wagner Archives at New York University.

Archives related to the WCSA include those for the Center for Working-Class Studies, housed at the Maag Library, Youngstown State University. Documents from the founding and development of the Center for Study of Working Class Life can be found in the university archive of the State University of New York at Stony Brook.
