= Carol Bonomo Albright =

American author, editor, and educator (born 1938)

- Born: Carol Bonomo; 1938 (age 87–88); New York City, U.S.
- Other name: Carol Bonomo Ahearn
- Education: Brown University
- Occupations: Writer, editor, educator

Carol Bonomo Albright (born 1938) is an American author, editor, and educator in Italian-American studies. She has published many books and articles on the subject and taught classes at the University of Rhode Island and the Harvard University Extension School. She was editor-in-chief of Italian Americana, a peer-reviewed cultural/historical journal, for over 25 years.

== Life ==
Carol Bonomo Albright was born in Greenwich Village, New York, in 1938. She attended St. Joseph Academy. Her parents were immigrants from the Calabria region of Southern Italy. She earned an M.A. from Brown University and received grants from the Danforth Foundation of Higher Education and the National Science Foundation for Medical Education.

Albright's essays, reviews, and other writings have appeared in many journals, such as PMLA, The Providence Journal, MELUS, and the Journal of American Ethnic Studies; in anthologies, such as Our Roots Are Deep With Passion: Creative Nonfiction Collects New Essays by Italian-American Writers (2015), Voices of the Daughters (1989), and Helen Barolini's The Dream Book: An Anthology of Writings by Italian American Women (1985); and in other books, such as The Italian American Experience: An Encyclopedia (2003) and Social Pluralism and Literary History: The Literature of the Italian Emigration (1996). In 2004, she co-edited an annotated edition of two novels by Joseph Rocchietti, one of which, Lorenzo and Oonalaska (1835), is the earliest known novel by an Italian-American. She also published a memoir in 2009.

Albright was editor-in-chief of Italian Americana from 1989 to 2015, and served two terms as vice president of the American Italian Historical Association.

== Works ==
Author:

- My Greenwich Village and the Italian American Community (2009) ISBN 9781608360376
- With Ned Balbo and Edvige Giunta, Padri : tre memoir italo americani (2009)
- Italian Immigrants Go West: The Impact of Locale on Ethnicity (2003) ISBN 978-0-934675-52-9
- Italian American Autobiographies (University of Rhode Island, 1993) ISBN 9781883386009

Editor:

- American Woman, Italian Style: Italian Americana's Best Writings on Women (Fordham University Press, 2011) ISBN 978-0-8232-3175-1
- Wild Dreams: The Best of Italian Americana (Fordham, 2008) ISBN 9780823229109
- Republican Ideals in the Selected Literary Works of Italian-American Joseph Rocchietti, 1835/1845 (2004)
