= Anna Quindlen =

American author and journalist

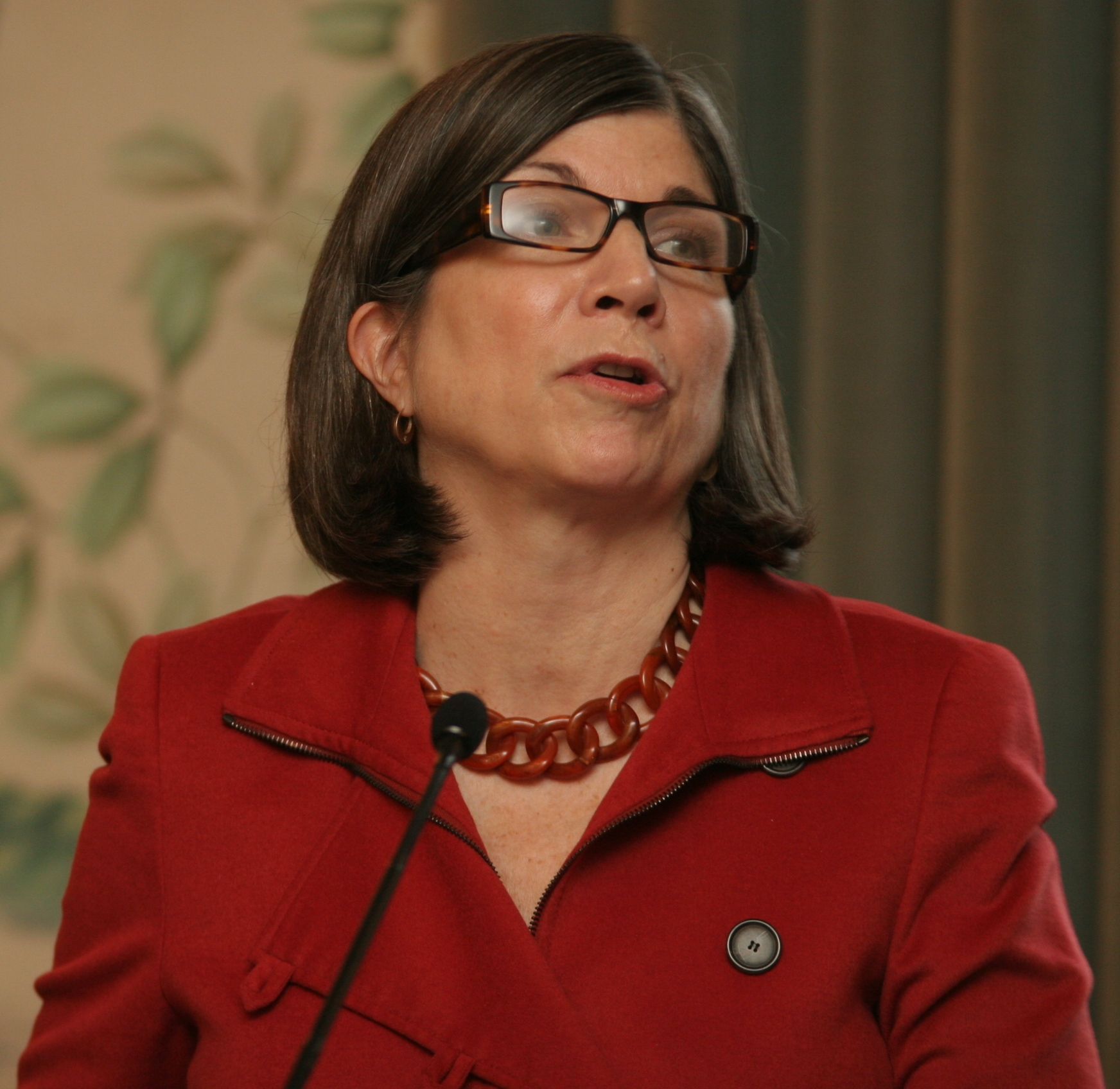
- Quindlen in 2008
- Born: July 8, 1952 (age 74); Philadelphia, Pennsylvania, U.S.
- Education: Barnard College
- Occupations: Columnist, novelist
- Spouse: Gerald Krovatin (m. 1978; div. 2021)
- Website: https://annaquindlen.net

Anna Marie Quindlen (born July 8, 1952) is an American author, journalist, and opinion columnist.

Her New York Times column, Public and Private, won the Pulitzer Prize for Commentary in 1992. Quindlen began her journalism career in 1974 as a reporter for the New York Post. Between 1977 and 1994 she held several posts at The New York Times. Her semi-autobiographical novel One True Thing (1994) served as the basis for the 1998 film starring Meryl Streep and Renée Zellweger.

== Life and career ==
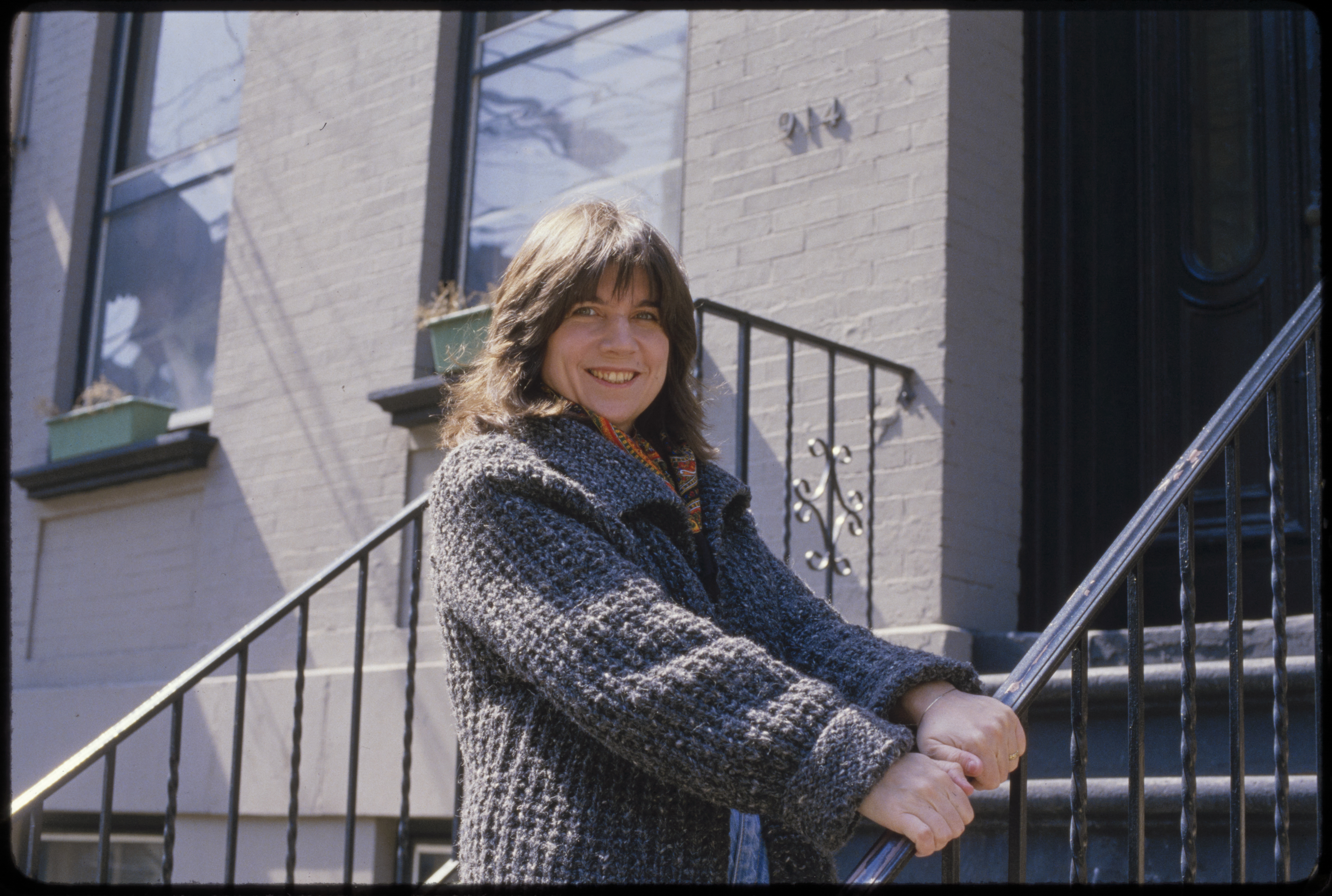
Anna Quindlen in 1985

Anna Quindlen was born in Philadelphia, Pennsylvania, on July 8, 1952, the daughter of Prudence (née Pantano, 1928–1972) and Robert Quindlen. Her father was Irish American and her mother was Italian American. Quindlen graduated in 1970 from South Brunswick High School in South Brunswick, New Jersey, and then attended Barnard College, from which she graduated in 1974. She was married to New Jersey attorney Gerald Krovatin, whom she met while in college. Their sons Quindlen Krovatin and Christopher Krovatin are published authors, and daughter Maria is an actress, comedian and writer.

She has written ten novels, several of which have been adapted into motion pictures. One True Thing was made into a feature film in 1998. It starred Meryl Streep, who received an Academy Award nomination for Best Actress for the role. Black and Blue and Blessings were made into television movies in 1999 and 2003, respectively.

== One True Thing ==
In 1994, her semi-autobiographical novel, titled One True Thing, was published. The book focuses on the relationship between a young woman and her mother, who is dying from cancer. Quindlen's own mother, Prudence Quindlen, died in 1972 while in her 40s from ovarian cancer. At the time Quindlen was a college student, but came home to take care of her mother.

In 1998, a film of the same name was released. The movie starred Meryl Streep and Renée Zellweger as Kate and Ellen Gulden, fictionalized versions of Prudence and Anna Quindlen. Streep was nominated for the Academy Award for Best Actress for her performance.

== Criticism ==
Writing in The New Republic, critic Lee Siegel cited Quindlen as an example of the "monsters of empathy" who "self subjugate and domesticate and assimilate every distant tragedy." He coined the term "The Quindlen Effect" to describe this phenomenon and suggested that it began with her Times column of December 13, 1992, in which Quindlen assailed the four alleged perpetrators of the Glen Ridge rape. "True to her niche," Siegel wrote, "Quindlen attacked with scathing indignation actions that no sane Times reader would ever defend." Siegel also referred to Barbara Kingsolver in the same essay, along with Quindlen, derisively as "Nice Queens".

In 1999, Villanova University invited Anna Quindlen to deliver the annual commencement address. But once the announcement was made, a group of anti-abortion students planned a protest against Quindlen's positions on reproductive rights, and she withdrew as speaker. The following year, however, she spoke at Villanova's graduation.

== Works ==
=== Nonfiction ===
External videos
- Booknotes interview with Quindlen on Thinking Out Loud, May 16, 1993, C-SPAN

- A Quilt of a Country* (2001)
- Living Out Loud (1988)
- Thinking Out Loud (1994)
- How Reading Changed My Life (1998)
- Homeless (1998)
- A Short Guide to a Happy Life (2000) ISBN 978-0-375-50461-7 from part of a cancelled commencement address that was to be given at Villanova
- Loud and Clear (2004)
- Imagined London (2004)
- Being Perfect (2005)
- Good Dog. Stay. (2007)
- Lots of Candles, Plenty of Cake (2012)
- Nanaville: Adventures in Grandparenting (2019)
- Write for Your Life (2022)

=== Novels ===
- Object Lessons (1991)
- One True Thing (1994)
- Black and Blue (1998)
- Blessings (2002)
- Rise and Shine (2006)
- Every Last One: A Novel (2010)
- Still Life with Bread Crumbs (2013)
- Miller's Valley (2016)
- Alternate Side (2018)
- After Annie (2024)
- More Than Enough (2026)

=== Children's books ===
- The Tree That Came To Stay (Illustrated by Nancy Carpenter) (1992)
- Happily Ever After (Illustrated by James Stevenson) (1997)

=== New table pictorials ===
- Naked Babies (Photographs by Nick Kelsh) (1996)
- Siblings (Photographs by Nick Kelsh) (1998)

== Awards ==
=== Industry awards ===
- 1992 Pulitzer Prize for Commentary
- 2001 Mothers At Home Media Award
- 2001 Clarion Award for Best Regular Opinion Column in a magazine
- 2002 Clarion Award for Best Opinion Column from the Association for Women in Communications

=== Honorary degrees ===
- Colby College
- Dartmouth College
- Denison University
- Grinnell College, May 2011
- Hamilton College, May 2006
- Kenyon College, May 2008
- Moravian College
- Mount Holyoke College
- Nantucket High School
- Pennsylvania State University
- Sarah Lawrence College
- Smith College
- Springfield College, May 2018
- Stevens Institute of Technology
- Villanova University
- Washington University in St. Louis
- Wesleyan University

=== Other awards from universities ===
- University Medal of Excellence from Columbia
- Poynter Fellow in Journalism at Yale
- Victoria Fellow in Contemporary Issues at Rutgers
- Fellow of the American Academy of Arts and Sciences
- Honorary Doctorate from The Pennsylvania State University (Aug.18 2007)
- Honorary Doctor of Humane Letters Degree from Washington University in St. Louis. (May. 19 2017)

=== Other awards ===
- 2006 Amelia Earhart Award from Crittenton Women's Union
- 2016 inductee into the New Jersey Hall of Fame
