= Black and Blue (Quindlen novel) =

1998 Anna Quindlen novel

- First edition cover
- Author: Anna Quindlen
- Language: English
- Genre: mystery or horror (novel)
- Published: August 1998 Random House
- Publication place: United States
- Media type: Print (hardback & paperback)
- Pages: 369 pages (first edition, hardcover)
- ISBN: 0-375-50051-0 (first edition, hardcover)
- OCLC: 37044050

Black and Blue is a 1998 novel by Anna Quindlen. It was chosen as an Oprah's Book Club selection in April 1998.

== Adaptations ==
=== Film ===
Black and Blue is a 1999 American made-for-TV movie. Based on the novel by Anna Quindlen directed by Paul Shapiro. After a woman's husband beats and abuses her, she and her son join the witness protection program and move away secretly.

Enough is a 2002 American drama-thriller film directed by Michael Apted. It stars Jennifer Lopez as Slim, an abused wife who learns to fight back. Enough garnered generally negative reviews from film critics, although several aspects of the film including the actors’ performances were praised.
