= Rose Basile Green =

American scholar, poet, and educator

- Green presenting a National Italian American Foundation award, c. 1987
- Born: Rose Basile; December 19, 1914; New Rochelle, New York
- Died: April 30, 2003 (aged 88); Lafayette Hill, Pennsylvania
- Education: College of New Rochelle; Columbia University; University of Pennsylvania
- Spouse: Raymond S. Green
- Children: Carol-Rae Green Sadano; Raymond F. Green
- Writing career
- Notable work: The Italian American Novel: A Document of the Interaction of Two Cultures (1974)

Dr. Rose Basile Green (December 19, 1914 – April 30, 2003) was an American scholar, poet, and educator. Among her publications were a study of Italian-American writers, titled The Italian American Novel: A Document of the Interaction of Two Cultures (1974), and several volumes of poetry, specializing in the sonnet form. She was also a founder of Cabrini College in Radnor, Pennsylvania, and the first chair of its English department.

== Early life and education ==
Rose Basile was born on December 19, 1914, in New Rochelle, New York, the daughter of Salvatore and Carolina Galgano Basile. Her father's family migrated to the United States from the town of Calitri in southern Italy. She grew up on a farm in Harwinton, Connecticut, where she and her siblings went to school in a one-room schoolhouse. She received a B.A. in English from the College of New Rochelle in 1935, an M.A. in Italian studies from Columbia University in 1941, and a Ph.D. in American civilization from the University of Pennsylvania in 1962.

== Career ==
After earning her B.A., she spent a year in Torrington, Connecticut, working for the Works Progress Administration's Federal Writers' Project. Afterwards she remained in the area for six more years, teaching English and Italian at Torrington High School and dramatics in the night school program. From 1942 to 1943, she was registrar and associate professor of English at the University of Tampa. From 1943 to 1953, she wrote radio scripts for the National Broadcasting Company. She taught English at Temple University from 1953 to 1957.

In 1957, she co-founded Cabrini College and became the first chairman of its English Department. She taught there until she retired in 1970. After retiring from teaching in 1970, she continued to publish poetry and scholarly works. In 1975, she published The Italian American Novel: A Document of the Interaction of Two Cultures, which examines the work of 70 Italian-American writers. It was the first major scholarly work of its kind, and laid the groundwork for analysis of recurring themes in Italian-American literature, such as the "isolated immigrant" and the "alien marginalized by the established society." Her sonnet collection, Primo Vino (1975), also celebrates Italian Americans, focusing on the family, the home, community life, outstanding Italian Americans, and residents of "Little Italy."

== Personal life and legacy ==
She married Raymond S. Green, a broadcasting executive, on June 20, 1942. The couple had two children. She had been living in Lafayette Hill, Pennsylvania, when she died on April 30, 2003.

Historian Frank Cavaioli named her an influential Italian American, writing:

Scholar/poet Rose Basile Green has shaped twentieth century awareness of Italian American literature. Her seminal work on the Italian American novel and her poems celebrating Italian heroes and Italian themes have contributed to the rich tapestry of American culture. Her career has served as a model in the women's movement for respect and equality, especially Italian American women.

== Memberships ==
She was a member of the following organizations, among others:

- Academy of American Poets
- American Academy of Political and Social Science
- American Studies Association
- American Association of University Women
- American Library Association
- Modern Language Association
- National Council of Teachers of English
- National Italian American Foundation (member of board of directors; vice president)
- Cosmopolitan Club of Philadelphia

== Awards ==
She received the following awards and honors:

- Humanities Award, Nationalities Service Center (Philadelphia), 1975, for The Italian-American Novel
- Woman of the Year Award, Sons of Italy of America, 1975, for The Italian-American Novel and Primo Vino
- City of Philadelphia Citation, 1975
- Agnes C. Brothers Pathway of Life Award, National Federation of State Poetry Societies, 1976
- National Award in Literature, Daughters of the American Revolution, 1976, for 76 for Philadelphia
- National Award in Literature, Association of Italian American Women ("Amita"), 1976
- National Award from National Italian American Foundation, 1978, for Woman, the Second Coming
- Appointment as Distinguished Daughter of Pennsylvania from state of Pennsylvania, 1978, for Woman, the Second Coming
- Ursula Laurus Citation, College of New Rochelle Alumnae, 1980
- Humanitarian Award, Chapel of Four Chaplains (Philadelphia), 1980
- National Award of Merit, Philadelphia Art Alliance, 1981
- Graduates Award for Distinguished Achievement, Columbia University, 1986
- Cavalier of Republic of Italy
- Ph.D., Gwynedd Mercy College and Cabrini College

== Works ==
- The Evolution of Italian American Fiction (1962)
- The Cabrinian Philosophy of Education (1967)
- The Violet and the Flame (1968)
- To Reason Why (1971)
- Primo Vino (1974)
- The Italian American Novel: A Document of the Interaction of Two Cultures (1974)
- Seventy-six for Philadelphia (1975)
- Woman: The Second Coming (1977)
- Songs of Ourselves (1982)
- The Pennsylvania People (1984)
- Mother Frances Xavier Cabrini (1984), with Saverio de Maria
- Challenger Countdown (1988)
- Five Hundred Years of America, 1492-1992 (1992)
- The Distaff Side: Great Women of American History (1995)
