= Italian Americana =

- Language: English
- Edited by: Carla A. Simonini

Publication details
- History: 1974-present
- Publisher: University of Illinois Press for Loyola University Chicago (United States)
- Frequency: Biannual

Standard abbreviations
- ISO 4: Ital. Am.

Indexing
- ISSN: 0096-8846
- LCCN: 75641589
- OCLC no.: 891511663

Links
- Journal homepage; Online archive

Italian Americana is a biannual peer-reviewed academic journal covering studies on the Italian-American experience. It publishes history, fiction, memoirs, poetry, and reviews. The editor-in-chief is Alan J. Gravano (Rocky Mountain University).

== History ==
The journal was established in 1974 by Richard Gambino, Ernest Falbo, and Bruno Arcudi under the auspices of Queens College, City University of New York, where Gambino taught. In 1989, Carol Bonomo Albright became editor, and the journal was published by the University of Rhode Island. Other notable assistant editors have included novelist Christine Palamidessi Moore and poets Dana Gioia, past Director of the National Endowment for the Arts, Michael Palma and Maria Terrone. Simonini became editor in 2015, and the journal moved to Youngstown State University. In the fall of 2019 the journal then moved to Loyola University Chicago, when Simonini became the Founding Director and Paul and Ann Rubino Endowed Associate Professor of Italian American Studies.
