= Edvige Giunta =

- Born: 1959 (age 66–67); Sicily
- Citizenship: Italy and U.S.
- Education: University of Catania; University of Miami
- Website: https://www.edvigegiunta.com

Edvige Giunta (born 1959) is a Sicilian-American writer, educator, and literary critic.

== Biography ==
She was born in Gela, Sicily, in 1959, the second of four children of Vincenzo and Cettina Giunta, both schoolteachers. After earning a degree in foreign languages and literature at the University of Catania in 1983, she moved to the United States to pursue graduate studies at the University of Miami. She received a master's degree in English in 1987 and a Ph.D. in 1989. She wrote her dissertation on James Joyce and her first book was titled A Raven Like a Writing-Desk: Lewis Carroll through James Joyce's Looking Glass.

In 1991 she moved to New York. She taught for a time at Union College, later becoming a Professor of English at New Jersey City University. She organized a program on female Italian-American writers at the City University of New York in 1995, and co-founded the Collective of Italian American Women in 1998. She has written extensively on Italian-American women's literature, and her articles, memoir, and poetry have appeared in numerous journals and anthologies. She also teaches memoir workshops.

Her awards include the NJCU Distinguished Faculty Award (2012), the Esposito Visiting Faculty Fellowship from UMass Dartmouth (2010), the OSIA Book Club Selection for Italian American Writers on New Jersey (2004), and the Educator of the Year Award for the Higher Education Category from the Association of Italian American Educators (2003).

In 2022, she and Mary Anne Trasciatti of the Triangle Fire Coalition, published Talking to the Girls: Intimate and Political Essays on the Triangle Shirtwaist Factory Fire. The book contains nineteen essays that document the 25 March 1911 fire that killed 146 (mostly female) workers in Manhattan's Triangle Shirtwaist Factory fire.

== Books ==
Author:

- A Raven Like a Writing-Desk: Lewis Carroll through James Joyce's Looking Glass (1991)
- Writing With an Accent: Contemporary Italian American Women Authors (2002)
- Dire l'indicibile: il memoir delle autrici italo americane (2002)
- With Ned Balbo and Carol Bonomo Albright. Padri : tre memoir italo americani (2009)
- Teaching Italian American Literature, Film, and Popular Culture (2010)
- Personal Effects: Essays on Memoir, Teaching, and Culture in the Work of Louise DeSalvo (2014)

Editor:

- Italian American Women Authors (1996)
- A Tavola: Food, Tradition, and Community Among Italian Americans (1998)
- With Louise DeSalvo. The Milk of Almonds: Italian American Women Writers on Food and Culture (2002)
- With Jennifer Gillan and Maria Mazziotti Gillan. Italian American Writers on New Jersey: An Anthology of Poetry and Prose (2003)
- Teaching Through Testimony (2005)
- With Joseph Sciorra. Embroidered Stories: Interpreting Women's Domestic Needlework from the Italian Diaspora (2014)
- With Mary Anne Trasciatti. Talking to the Girls: Intimate and Political Essays on the Triangle Shirtwaist Factory Fire (2022)

Contributor:

- Afterword, Paper Fish by Tina DeRosa (1996)
- Afterword, Umbertina by Helen Barolini (1999)
- Introduction, Bronx Italian by Rosette Capotorto (2002)
- Introduction, Vertigo: A Memoir by Louise DeSalvo (2002)
- American Visual Memoirs After the 1970s: Studies on Gender, Sexuality, and Visibility in the Post-Civil Rights Age (2010)
