= Italians in Chicago =

Ethnic group

Chicago and its suburbs have a historical population of Italian Americans. As of 2000, about 500,000 in the Chicago area identified themselves as being Italian descent. As of 2023, this figure had increased to 573,170, making the Italian community in Chicago the 3rd largest in the US after New York and Philadelphia, and just slightly larger than that of Boston.

== History ==
The first Italian to come to what would become Chicago was Enrico (Henri) Tonti, who was from Gaeta in Lazio region of central Italy. He was a soldier in service of the French. In the Fall of 1680, Tonti was in the la Salle Expedition and 2nd in command of the company. He and Father Membré, passed through the Chicago Portage from the Illinois valley to go to Green Bay (having reached the Illinois River with La Salle by way of the Kankakee portage). On Jan. 7, 1682, Tonti met La Salle at Chicago, and together with a group of 21 additional Frenchmen and 30 Indians they used the portage on their way to the Mississippi, the mouth of which they reached on April 9, 1682. In 1697, Henri Tonti, Michel Accault, and François de la Forêt received permission from Governor Frontenac to establish a fortified trading post at Chicagou managed by Pierre de Liette, Tonti's cousin, a Franco-Italian, which lasted until c.1705. De Liette kept a journal of his experiences living with the Illinois natives for those years he lived with them at the Chicago trading post. De Liette divided his time from 1691 to 1705 between the Miami at Chicago and the Illinois at Fort St. Louis de Pimiteoui, Peoria, which he had helped build. In Chicago, he ran a trading post in partnership with François Daupin de la Forêt, Michel Accault, and Henri de Tonti [located probably near today's Tribune Tower] which he had to close, leaving in 1705 after the king revoked his trading license; continued as French commander and trader in the Illinois country until 1720. From Liette's memoirs: "Most beautiful, you begin to see its fertility at Chicago, unwooded prairies, requiring only to be turned up by the plow, most temperate climate."

In the 1850s, Italians settled in Chicago. Originally, most were Genoese. The first generation worked primarily as merchants, restaurateurs, and fruit sellers. Some worked in the plaster industry. The plaster workers originated from Lucca.

A second wave of immigration, this time from rural areas in southern and central Italy, arrived between 1880 and 1914. As of 2014, most Italian Americans in Chicago were descended from this immigration wave, which consisted mainly of young men, mostly illiterate and low-income. In 1920, Chicago had the third-largest ethnic Italian population in the nation, surpassed only by New York City and Philadelphia.

Rudolph J. Vecoli wrote that Al Capone had damaged the reputation of the Italian community in Chicago.

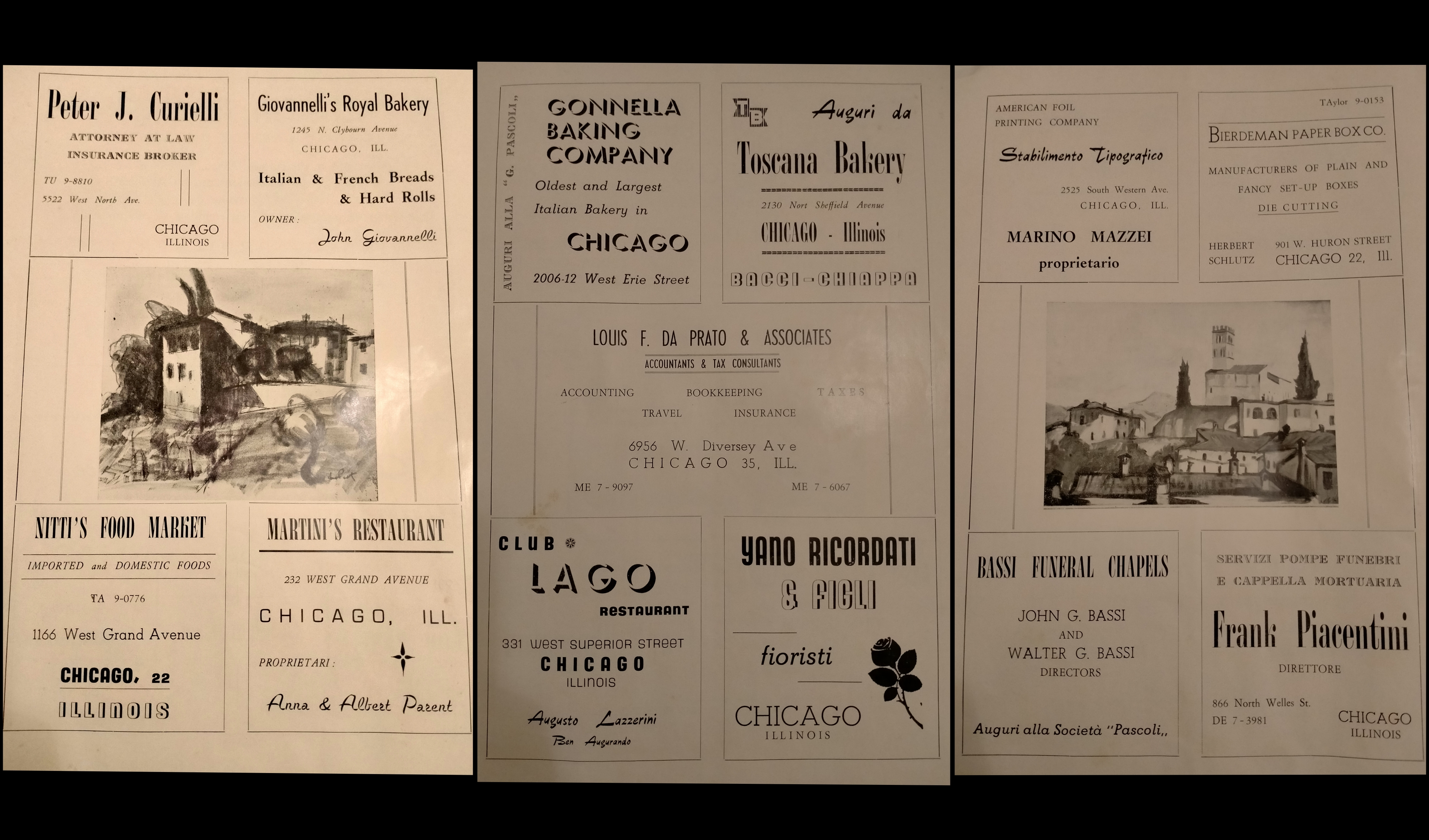
Chicago Italians' businesses advertising, 1962

Dominic Candeloro, author of Italians in Chicago, 1945-2005, stated that "ballpark" estimates were that between 1945 and 2005, 25,000 Italians, including recent immigrants from Calabria, Apulia, and Sicily, arrived in Chicago. The Italians who came in this wave were more nationalistic, entrepreneurial and educated than those of previous waves. The Italians settled in Addison, Berwyn, Elmwood Park, Melrose Park, Norridge, Westchester and elsewhere. But now many Italian residents of Elmwood Park and Melrose Park have moved out of the area and the area now has an increase of Hispanics living there which has started sometime in the 80s and 90s. Many of the Italian residents grew old and died and new Italian residents have not moved into those towns. Candeloro wrote that they "rescued Italian American life in the city from a total meltdown, injected new enthusiasm into dying institutions and new organizations like the Italian Cultural Center".

In the post-World War II era, many Little Italies in Chicago disappeared. Some were demolished to make way for new institutions and structures. The University of Illinois Chicago, highways, and public housing replaced former Italian neighborhoods. This caused increasing numbers of Italians to move to suburbs west of Chicago.

In 1970, there were 202,373 Italian immigrants and children of Italian immigrants living in the Chicago area, making up about 3% of the total population. By 1970, a majority of the ethnic Italians in the Chicago area lived in suburban communities such as Berwyn, Cicero, and Oak Park. That year, Rudolph J. Vacoli stated that "vestiges" of former Italian American communities within Chicago still existed.

== Geography ==
As of 1980, 20,000 of the 138,000 ethnic Italians in the City of Chicago lived in Belmont-Cragin, Dunning, and Montclare areas, giving them the highest concentrations of ethnic Italians.

The area at the intersection of 24th Street and Oakley Avenue, southwest of the Chicago Loop, had a group of people from Tuscany, with many from Bagni di Lucca, Montecatini Terme, and Ponte Buggianese. Many of the residents of this area worked at the McCormick Reaper plant. A man who grew up in the neighborhood, Peter Venturelli, wrote a dissertation about it. Candeloro wrote that this area was "perhaps the best preserved Little Italy" in Chicago in the year 1990.

The first Italian American community in Chicago was located near what is now the Merchandise Mart in the Near North Side and had residents from Genoa and Lucca. An area known as "Little Hell" and "Little Sicily" in the Near North Side had, by 1920, 20,000 Italian Americans and Italian immigrants.

An area near Polk Street Station in the southern end of the Chicago Loop had residents from Ricigliano, Salerno. The community around Santa Maria Addolorata Church in the near northwest side had residents from Bari, Sicily and elsewhere in Italy. The Taylor Street neighborhood in the Near West Side had residents from Abruzzo, Bari, Basilicata, Calabria, Lucca, Marche, Messina, Naples, Palermo and Salerno.

The Grand Crossing area had Calabrian migrants, and the area at the intersection of 69th Street and Hermitage had migrants from Salerno. Roseland had an Italian community from Piedmont. Pullman had an Italian community originating from the Altopiano di Asiago, Veneto; many of the residents were brickmakers.

Many Italians (along with Germans) lived in the area north of the Chicago river in Lincoln Park, Chicago. In 1936, a statue of Giuseppe Garibaldi was unveiled in Lincoln Park to a crowd of 5,000 Italian Americans.

By 1920, 50% of Chicago Heights was ethnic Italian. Most of the Chicago Heights Italians originated from Amaseno, Lazio; Caccamo, Sicily; Castel di Sangro; and San Benedetto del Tronto, Marche. Blue Island also had an Italian settlement. The men originated from Ripacandida, Basilicata and were railroad workers.

== Institutions ==
In 1907, the Italian-American Chamber of Commerce, an organization promoting US-Italy trade, opened.

Historical clubs included the Amasenese Society, the Maroons Soccer Club, and the Mazzini-Verdi Society.

Vecoli wrote that Chicago has 150 Italian organizations. In 1945, the Italian Welfare Council opened, providing recreational, educational, and social services. In 1952, it was replaced by the Italian American Civic Committee, an umbrella organization which sponsors the annual Columbus Day parade.

== Media ==
Beginning in 1960, the newspaper Fra Noi was published. By the 1950s/1960s, Italian television and radio programs were available.

In previous eras, there were radio programs available for the Italians, with around twelve in the Italian language.

== Politics ==
In Chicago, ethnic Italians have been Chicago aldermen, suburban mayors, county judges, and legislators in the Illinois government. Italian politicians have been elected in Blue Island, Chicago Heights, Elmwood Park, Evergreen Park, Highwood and Melrose Park.

Dominic Candeloro stated that, in the City of Chicago, few Italians have been elected to major offices because "The number of Italians in the larger electoral units has never been great enough to challenge successfully other ethnic groups, and the Mafia image has made it difficult for Italian politicians in larger districts." Candeloro added, "There has never been even a serious Italian candidate for mayor of Chicago."

Jerome Cosentino, an ethnic Italian from Chicago, was elected Illinois State Treasurer, becoming the first to hold a statewide office in Illinois.

Italian Chicago native Ralph C. Capparelli was a member of the Illinois House of Representatives and served for 33 years (13th and 16th District) from 1971 to 2004.

In 1996, Al Salvi ran for one of Illinois' US Senate seats, but lost.

== Religion ==
The Italian community was and still is predominantly Catholic. Vecoli wrote that "A few Italian inner-city parishes remain, but most were either dissolved or turned over to incoming groups." This was a result in many moving out to the suburbs and the influx of Catholics from other ethnicities.

The Church of the Assumption opened in the first Italian neighborhood in 1881. It was the first Italian Catholic church in Chicago. The Scalabrian Church of Santa Maria Incoronata served Italians living in what is now Chinatown. In the 1980s, the church became a mission of the St. Theresa Church as a way to serve Chinese people. Dominic Candeloro wrote that once the church changed into being a mission, it was no longer the "focal center" of the Italian community there. The religious institutions in the West Side of Chicago serving Italians included a hospital (founded by Mother Cabrini) and the Our Lady of Pompeii and Holy Guardian Angel Churches.

The community at 69th and Hermitage attended the St. Mary of St. Carmel Church. The Italians in Pullman and Roseland attended the Scalabrian Church of St. Anthony of Padua. The local church in Chicago Heights was San Rocco, which opened in 1906 and was closed by Archbishop of Chicago Cardinal Joseph Bernardin in 1990. The Blue Island Italian settlement was served by the church of San Donatus.

Italian religious street festivals have long occurred in Chicago and, as of the 1990s, several still continued.

The Missionaries of St. Charles Borromeo (Scalabrini Fathers) had several institutions in the western suburbs. The order operated institutions for ethnic and religious purposes. The order operated the Italian Cultural Center at Casa Italia, located in Stone Park, the Sacred Heart Seminary in Melrose Park, and the Villa Scalabrini Nursing and Rehabilitation Center (formerly Villa Scalabrini Home for the Aged), located in Northlake. The villa, which opened in 1951, was first proposed in 1945.

== Education ==
In the 1950s Our Lady of the Angels School in western Chicago was majority Italian American in its student body. In 1958 the Our Lady of the Angels School fire occurred, affecting the Italian American community in Chicago. The fire was one factor that caused existing residents to leave, and in the 1960s the Italian American population of the area around the church and school began to decrease.

== Legacy ==
Paper Fish, a novel by Tina De Rosa, is set in Little Italy, the Italian community of the Near West Side of Chicago.

== Notable residents ==
This includes residents of the City of Chicago and of its suburbs:

- Theresa Amato (attorney and national presidential campaign manager)
- Joseph Bernardin (cardinal)
- Nicholas Bua (judge)
- Frances Xavier Cabrini
- Al Capone
- Dan Castellaneta (actor)
- Harry Caray (sportscaster)
- Dino D'Angelo (real estate)
- Aldo DeAngelis (Illinois State Senator)
- Tina De Rosa, author of Paper Fish
- Dominick DeMatteo (founder of the Dominick's supermarket chain)
- Dennis Farina (actor)
- Enrico Fermi (nuclear scientist)
- Johnny Galecki (actor)
- Fred Gardaphé (writer)
- Neil Giuntoli (actor)
- Joe Mantegna (actor)
- Antonio Pasin (manufacturer Radio Flyer Wagons)
- Allison Rosati (journalist)
- Anthony Scariano (politician)
- Gary Sinise (actor)
- Rocco Sisto (actor)
- Jeremy Sisto (actor)
- Anthony Tortoriello
- Ron Turano (bread business)

== Sources ==
- Candeloro, Dominic. Italians in Chicago, 1945-2005 (Illinois Collection, Images of America). Arcadia Publishing, 2010. ISBN 0738583642, 9780738583648.
- Candeloro, Dominic. "Chicago's Italians: A Survey of the Ethnic Factor, 1850–1990." In: Jones, Peter d'Alroy and Melvin G. Holli. Ethnic Chicago: A Multicultural Portrait. Wm. B. Eerdmans Publishing, 1995. p. 229–259. ISBN 0802870538, 9780802870537.
