= Golden Age Nursing Home fire =

Electrical fire that took place at an assisted living facility in late November, 1963

- Date: November 23, 1963
- Time: after 4:45 a.m.
- Location: Fitchville, Ohio, United States; 41°5′39.11″N 82°29′17.29″W
- Type: Fire
- Cause: Electrical fire
- Deaths: 63

The Golden Age Nursing Home fire took place soon after 4:45 am on November 23, 1963, a mile north of Fitchville, Ohio, United States, killing 63 residents. The news of the fire was overshadowed by the assassination of President John F. Kennedy, which had occurred in Dallas, Texas on the previous day (November 22).

The fire was the United States' deadliest blaze since the December 1958 fire at Chicago's Our Lady of the Angels School that killed 95 people. It also marked the second fire in less than a week involving the elderly, following the November 18 disaster that claimed 25 people at the Surfside Hotel in Atlantic City.

== Building ==
The L-shaped, concrete block, one-story, 186-by-65 foot building had passed inspection the previous March. The original building was constructed of cement blocks on a slab foundation with a flat wood roof covered by paper and tar. Interior renovations were made initially in 1953 to convert it into a nursing home, with the lobby being constructed in 1955. The facility also had a 2-room addition that was made of wood, aluminum siding and plywood paneling. Twenty-two residents lived in the addition. In late 1962, patients who were not considered mentally ill had been transferred there after being removed from the Cleveland State Hospital.

== Fire ==
The blaze began so quickly that an attempt to call the local fire department proved fruitless when the facility's telephone wires were burned. A truck driver, Henry Dahmen, was passing through the rural area between Cleveland and Toledo when he saw sparks on the north end of the roof coming from arcing electric wires that had sagged through the pine trees in the front lawn. Dahmen found a member of the staff, but on dialling for help, discovered the phone lines in the building were down. They were able to alert local officials, but strong winds caused the flames to envelop the one-story building. A female attendant noticed the fire shortly before 5 a.m.: upon seeing a flash of light through the main entrance doors and thinking at first it might have been a car's headlights, she looked out of the window and saw flames at the corner eaves of the lobby section. This was the entry point for the building's electrical service.

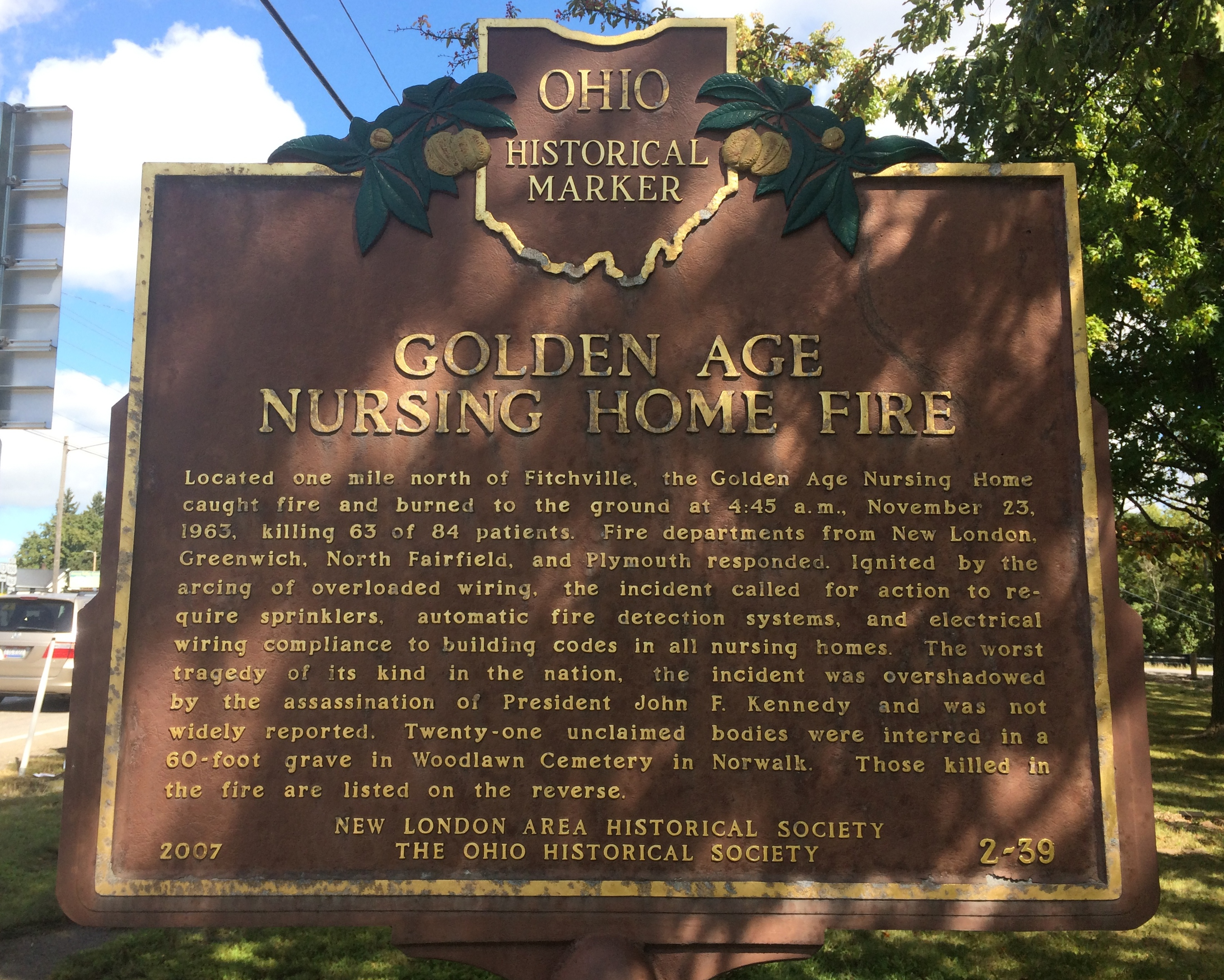
Ohio Historical Marker memorial of the fire

Two other truck drivers also helped bring out residents from the facility. One of the patients who was ambulatory managed to evacuate himself and three others out an exit, but stated later the smoke was so thick he only got out as he knew where the exit door was. By the time firefighters arrived at the building around 10 minutes after the first call, the building was engulfed by flames from one end to the other. When the firefighters responded to the scene the fire was burning so hot that the tar on the roof began to boil and fall onto the ground near rescuers.

The building's owner, Robert W. Pollack, indicated that many of the residents could have been saved had they not panicked. "Instead of going out the doors, they went back to their beds," said Pollack. However, the facility had an undivided attic and no automatic sprinkler system. It had three portable fire extinguishers but no local manual fire alarm. It was also reported that some of the victims were restrained to their beds, or trapped in wheelchairs that were too wide to exit the rooms properly.

== Victims ==
The three employees who were present and 21 residents survived. About 2/3 of the survivors were invalids and some had suffered burns and smoke inhalation.

Thirty-five of the home's thirty-six mental patients died during the blaze and many were so burned that identification was done based on the bed registration of the bed they were found in. Before any bodies were removed in the aftermath, each was numbered and the location was recorded on a chart, then from memory attendants and the manager identified the bodies due to location discovered. During the recovery of remains firefighters were told to spray the occupied metal beds holding remains lightly so that the remains would not be damaged. At least one set of remains was identified to have restraints still fastened to her arms. The remains of 21 residents not claimed by family members were buried in a single gravesite on November 29.

== Aftermath ==
Due to the large number of lives lost, Ohio Governor James A Rhodes directed that the investigation be more intensive than usual, and for it to be headed by State Fire Marshal Fred Rice. The investigation continued through December 30, 1963 and required more than 3,300 man-hours; 100 people were questioned, including 39 firemen and police officers. The investigation concluded that the existence of a documented evacuation plan and familiarity with the plan by aides on duty would have saved more lives.

The fire was featured in the 2006 documentary Fireland by Justin Zimmerman.

== See also ==
- Wincrest Nursing Home fire
