= Karen Culp =

Karen Culp may refer to:

- A voice actress for Kenny the Shark
- A student who died in Room 212 in the Our Lady of the Angels School Fire
