= Paper Fish =

1980 novel by Tina DeRosa

- 1996 edition
- Author: Tina DeRosa
- Publisher: Wine Press, The Feminist Press
- Publication date: 1980
- Publication place: United States
- OCLC: 469721177

Paper Fish is a 1980 novel by Antoinette "Tina" De Rosa (1944–2007), published initially by Wine Press and re-published by The Feminist Press in 1996. The novel is set in Little Italy, the Italian community around Taylor Street, in the Near West Side, during the 1940s and the 1950s. Connie Lauerman of the Chicago Tribune described Paper Fish as an "autobiographical novel". The book's main character is Carmolina BellaCasa and the book is centered on her family. The primary relationship in the novel is between the main character and Doria, her grandmother. Other characters include Carmolina's father and mother and her ill older sister.

== Story ==
The book's chapters consist of the Prelude, Parts I-VI, and an Epilogue. Mary Jo Bona, author of "Broken Images, Broken Lives: Carmolina's Journey in Tina De Rosa's Paper Fish," described the novel as having an "unconventional" structure and a circular form.

The prelude is narrated in the first-person by Carmolina, who is unborn at this point. After the prelude the story uses the third-person narrative form. Part I, "The Memory," describes the childhood memories of Doria and the lives of Carmolina's parents. Part II, "Summer 1949 – Late July," chronicles the efforts of residents of Carmolina's neighborhood in searching for her, since she has run away from home. A meeting in the kitchen of the BellaCasa house occurs at the end of the scene. Bona wrote that Doria "dominates" the kitchen scene. Part III, "The Family," chronicles Doria's life when she had been recently married. It also has a section about the marriage of Carmolina's parents. The destruction of the BellaCasa family residence by a fire takes place in this chapter.

Part IV, "Summer 1949 – Early June" describes Doriana's illness, the lives of the residents of Carmolina's neighborhood, and Carmolina's observations of area gypsies. In this chapter the family considers institutionalizing Doriana. Fearing that if the family sends Doriana away, she may be sent away too, Carmolina makes herself become ill to end the family meeting. Carmolina decides to run away from home, and in Part V, "Summer 1949 – Late July," she goes on a streetcar and goes to a neighborhood described by Bona as "unfriendly to ethnics." The chapter includes Carmolina's recollections of conversations between herself and her grandmother. Bona wrote that the recollections "clarify her understanding of herself and Doriana's illness." Doriana has a high fever in this chapter; Bona wrote that this occurs "as though [Doriana is] cognizant of Carmolina's absence". The police discover Carmolina and return her to her household, where Carmolina becomes ill with a malady similar to Doriana's.

The final part takes place nine years after the previous chapter. In Part VI, "Summer 1958", Carmolina and Doria have a ritual ceremony. Bona wrote that "In this symbolic scene, Carmolina receives a legacy of selfhood." The immigrant community in Carmolina's neighborhood is forced to move away in the book's epilogue.

== Characters ==
- Carmolina BellaCasa
  - The main character
- Doria BellaCasa
  - Carmolina's paternal grandmother, Doria, lives in a residence across from Carmolina's house. She grew up in a town near Naples with her parents and her sister Sabatina.
    - In the novel the current events and the memories of Doria's life in Italy are mixed together. Mary Jo Bona, author of "Broken Images, Broken Lives: Carmolina's Journey in Tina De Rosa's Paper Fish," wrote that Carmolina "uses her grandmother's memories of the homeland as the subjective topography for her own fertile imagination" and that the interspersing of the past and present "reinforces the usefulness of the past for" Carmolina.
- Doriana BellaCasa
  - Carmolina's older sister, Doriana, has an illness. The family speculates about the reasons why the older sister is ill, but the novel never states the cause of the illness. In the novel, Doriana does not recover from the illness, she does not die from the illness, and she is not sent to a sanatorium.
    - Ann LoLordo of the Baltimore Sun describes the sister as "a strange spirit hovering in the family flat". Bona wrote that "Though it is true that Italians in America have been traditionally resistant to the idea of institutionalizing family members, the sick characters" present in several other novels "do not remain an integral, compelling part of the text as the first daughter, Doriana, does in Paper Fish." LoLordo wrote that "DeRosa never fully explores the effect of this damaged child on Carmolina" and that "I understand that this family can't articulate their loss, but DeRosa can and doesn't."
- Marco BellaCasa
  - Marco is Carmolina's father. He is a police officer.
- Sarah BellaCasa
  - Sarah is Carmolina's mother. She is Lithuanian American.

== Publication ==
When she was 17, Tina De Rosa was, along with her family, forced to move from her Chicago residence. Two years after she had to move, De Rosa's grandmother died. Her father, a police officer, died two years after her grandmother's death. De Rosa stated that she had been "dealing with terrible grief and sorrow" and needed to "talk to" her deceased relatives, "so I would sit down and write about them. And that would make them—and the place where I grew up—present again. I just poured my heart and soul into it, never knowing it would be published. Writing is a very solitary thing. Me and my soul."

The novel was developed during an eight-year period. Michael Anania, a writer who served as De Rosa's mentor while she studied for her master's degree in English at the University of Illinois at Chicago, read some early versions of her work. Lauerman stated that there were times when De Rosa "tried to find her voice" and had "abandon[ed]" it on some occasions, and also that she "struggled" during the writing process.

In 1977 De Rosa gave a reading from a draft of her work. After her reading, the head of the Chicago publishing company Wine Press, Jim Ramholz, approached De Rosa and offered to publish it. By 1980 he had received a grant from the Illinois Arts Council and he used this grant to publish the book. The initial press run was for 1,000 copies. Months after the book was first published, it went out of print. At the time the book was first published, De Rosa was in her 30s. An excerpt of Paper Fish was re-printed in The Dream Book: An Anthology of Writings by Italian American Women by Helen Barolini. This 1985 anthology had works from 56 writers, all Italian-American women.

Lauerman wrote that the book had become unknown after the print run ended, and Edvige Giunta, the author of the afterword of the 2002 Feminist Press printing of Paper Fish, stated that the novel was mostly "excluded from literary history" and that it and De Rosa "remained in the shadows for fifteen years." Lauerman had stated that "Only a handful of Italian-American scholars kept "Paper Fish" alive by mentioning it in dissertations and essays and circulating photocopies of it." Some academics had used this book as part of courses on Italian-American culture, and so their students could read the book they distributed photocopies of the novel to them.

Fred Gardaphé, a professor at Columbia College Chicago, had given the novel a favorable review when it first came out. In June 1995 he sat next to the director of the Feminist Press, Florence Howe, while attending a working class studies conference in Ohio. Gardaphé discussed the novel with Howe, and he gave her a copy. This resulted in the re-publishing by the Feminist Press.

It was published in Italian, as Pesci di carta, by Nutrimenti.

== Analysis ==
Mary Jo Bona wrote an article about the book that was published by MELUS, the academic journal by The Society for the Study of the Multi-Ethnic Literature of the United States. The 1987 article discusses how the novel intertwines its three issues. Paper Fish had explored illness, ethnicity, and gender.

== Reception ==
Lauerman wrote that when the book was first published, "people turned [De Rosa's] head, telling her she was brilliant, a genius." A portion of the manuscript, which had been pre-published, received a nomination for the Carl Sandburg Award. The Sandburg Award is a literary prize from the Friends of the Chicago Public Library given out every year.

Fred Gardaphé was the first critic to review the novel. His review was published in the American Italian Historical Newsletter. Gardaphé stated that he felt so "astonished" when the first read it and that he bought as many copies as possible so he could distribute them to his friends.

Writer Louise DeSalvo gave a quote to Florence Howe for the book jacket, stating that Paper Fish was "the best Italian-American novel by a woman in this century". Howe stated that when she first sent a copy of the book to writer to DeSalvo, DeSalvo was astonished that she had not heard of the book before.

== See also ==
- Italians in Chicago
