= When Angels Wept =

Play by Charles Grippo

When Angels Wept by Charles Grippo is a play about the Our Lady of the Angels School fire. It had two productions in 2013 by New Lincoln Theatre at the Prop Theatre and City Lit Theatre in Chicago, Illinois. The story is centered on a small group of survivors of the fire and how the tragedy affected their lives until present day.
