= Carlopoli =

Carlopoli Garruàpui (Sicilian)
- Comune
- Comune di Carlopoli
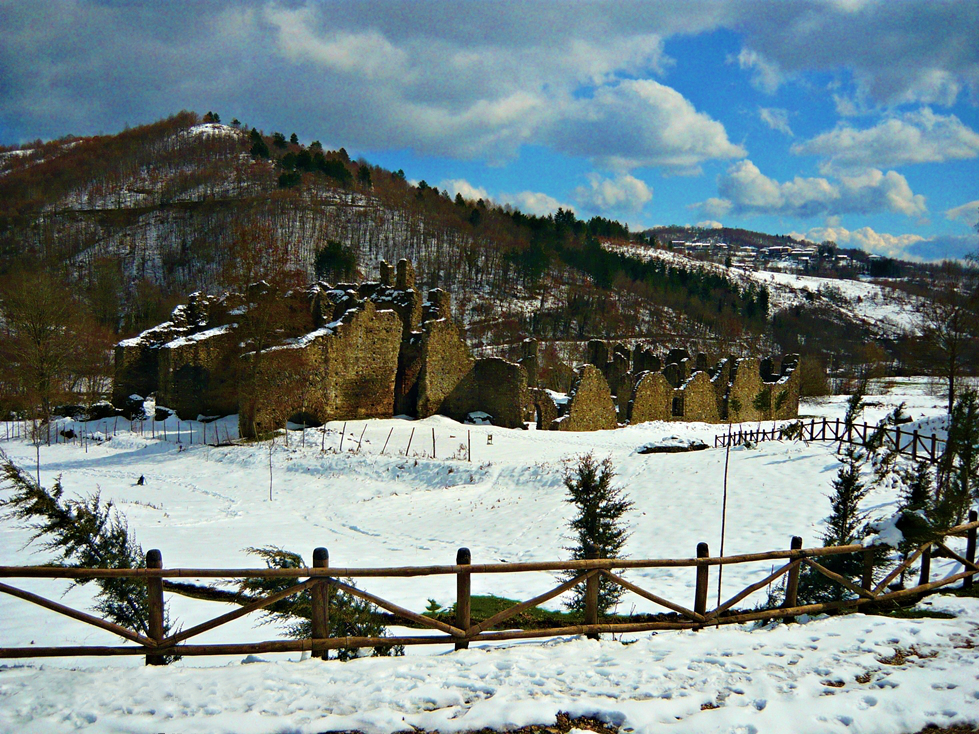

- Location within Italy Location within Calabria
- Coordinates: 39°03′N 16°27′E
- Country: Italy
- Region: Calabria
- Province: Catanzaro (CZ)

Government
  - Mayor: Mario Talarico

Area
  - Total: 16 km^{2} (6.2 sq mi)
- Elevation: 924 m (3,031 ft)

Population (31 December 2013)
  - Total: 1,559
  - Density: 97/km^{2} (250/sq mi)
- Time zone: UTC+1 (CET)
  - Summer (DST): UTC+2 (CEST)
- Postal code: 88040
- Dialing code: 0968
- Website: Official website

Carlopoli (Calabrian: Garruópulu, Garròpulu or Garruàpui) is a town and comune (municipality) in the province of Catanzaro in the Calabria region of southern Italy. It includes the village of Castagna.
