= Charles Grippo =

American attorney/playwright/author/producer

Charles Grippo is an American attorney, playwright, author, and producer. His plays have been produced in multiple states throughout America, including Illinois, Indiana, New York, and California. He is best known for his plays, Sex Marks the Spot and When Angels Wept When Angels Wept is based on the 1958 fire at the Our Lady of the Angels Catholic School, in which ninety two children and three nuns died. He also wrote the books Stage Producer's Business and Legal Guide and Business and Legal Forms for the Theater, both of which have gone into second editions. He is president of New Lincoln Theatre, Inc., a commercial theater company, and Grippo Stage Company, Inc., a (501 (c) (3) public charity. He produced a revival of James Sherman's comedy The God of Isaac. With Dennis Zacek, he produced Confessions of a P.I.M.P., written and performed by Tony Award (c) winner Andre De Shields. He produced the world premiere of The Ben Hecht Show, written and performed by James Sherman, based on the writings of Ben Hecht.
