= Wincrest Nursing Home fire =

1976 fire in Chicago, Illinois

- Date: January 30, 1976
- Time: Before 11:30 a.m. (CST)
- Location: Chicago, Illinois, United States; 41.997218°N 87.658826°W
- Type: Fire
- Cause: Arson
- Deaths: 23

The Wincrest Nursing Home fire took place on Friday, January 30, 1976, in Chicago, Illinois, United States. The fire occurred when an arsonist set a wardrobe closet on fire at the Wincrest Nursing Home building, located at 6326 N. Winthrop Avenue. The alarm sounded at 11:30 a.m. and the fire was put out at 1:30 p.m. Although the building itself sustained minor smoke, fire and water damage, 23 people died from smoke inhalation. 21-year-old housekeeper Denise Watson was arrested by authorities and was charged with murder and arson. However, she was acquitted in 1977.

The fire was described as the worst of its kind in Chicago's history, and caused the Board of Health to enact changes.

== The building ==
In its design plan, the building complex consisted of 28 rooms, which could accommodate 88 residents. The original brick building was demolished in 1966 as part of a three-stage construction project and was replaced by a three-story building and a garden. The complex was finally completed in 1973.

=== Construction of the building ===
The original nursing home complex was a 1,906 sq ft (177 m²) brick building consisting of two floors. In 1959, a second building was added to the rear which includes a garden. The addition increased the size of the complex to 5,179 sq ft (481 m²). The addition was built with precast concrete floor and roof slabs connected to steel beams and columns. In 1966, the brick building was removed and was replaced by a three-story building; at the same time, a third floor was added to the original building constructed in 1959. Overall, the second addition expanded the complex to 9,466 sq ft (879 m²). In 1973, a third building was added with a 10 ft (3 m) corridor connecting to the existing building complex. The third building also consisted of three floors and had a floor area of 3,613 sq ft (336 m²). The construction of the third building, consisted of precast concrete floor slabs, metal roof deck on steel bar joists. All of the buildings were covered with a 5/8 inch fire rated plasterboard.

=== Structural details ===
After the entire complex was finished in 1973, it had nursing area, lounges, and a small kitchen with no cooking appliances, closets and bathrooms on the all three floors. The complex also had a laundry room, boiler room, storage room and chapel lounge which is located in the third building of the complex.

In the design plan, the nursing home complex only had two stairways. The first stairways are located in the first building, near the lobby area and the second stairway is located in the second building. Both stairways had doors that have wire mesh windows and are operated by hydraulic door closers. The complex also had only one elevator which also located in the first building across from the lobby stairway. The exterior walls of the building consisted of brick and concrete blocks surrounded by gypsum board. The interior walls also consistent of gypsum with the outer wall finish consisting of paint, wallpaper, ceramic tile and vinyl. Overall, the entire structural system of the building complex consisted of a reinforced concrete foundation and floor slabs up to 8 inches (200 mm) thick. All of the floor slabs are supported by fire resistant columns and beams.

All of the patient rooms, lounge areas, and chapel on all three floors had a natural ventilation system (i.e. open windows). The restroom area, enclosed garden area, nurses offices and other rooms in the building complex were ventilated by heater, air conditioner and ceiling fans. All of the buildings electrical system were composed of system II required emergency exit signs and corridor lighting system. The system operated an automatic transfer switch which operates the emergency lights in case of power failure. The third floor of the building complex had battery powered emergency lighting.

The nursing home was equipped with a manual and automatic fire alarm system that is connected directly to the fire alarm office of the Chicago Fire Department. The alarm system was designed to give out a code or box number of the alarm station when activated. The manual fire alarm system consisted of two pull fire alarm boxes located on each floor and one fire alarm box located at the entrance of the building. The automatic fire alarms are activated by heat sensors which are located on the third floor, both stairways and in the storage closet. The automatic fire alarm system also consisted of smoke detectors. On the third floor, three fire extinguishers and two public address loud speakers were installed.

=== Building conditions before the fire ===
The Wincrest Nursing Home was inspected by three departments (health, building and fire) on a monthly basis. The last inspection occurred on January 8, 1976 (21 days before the fire). All inspections showed no code or health violations.

== Incident ==
At the time of the fire, the building was occupied by 83 residents, three nurses, 2 aides and eleven office, kitchen and maintenance staff. 28 of the residents were in the chapel room on the third floor of the building.

=== The fire ===
Fire was reported in room 306 by a nurse's aide who pulled the fire alarm box. The alarm was received by the Chicago Fire Department at 11:43 A.M (CDT). Attempts to put out the fire by staff proved to no avail. The first fire engine arrived at the scene of the fire 3 minutes and 40 seconds later as nursing home staff evacuated the burning building. More fire engines arrived seconds later as smoke was seen rising from the top of the building. At 11:46 A.M., firefighters fighting the fire, discovered the third floor heavily laden with smoke and trapped elderly patients in wheelchairs. The victims were immediately removed from the burning building and were transported to nearby hospitals.

The fire was put out at 1:28 p.m. CDT. The room where the fire broke out was completely gutted and the adjacent corridor sustained only moderate smoke and heat damage. Three other rooms also suffered heat and smoke damage. No smoke damage was evident on the second or first floors and water damage was minor. However, despite the minor damage to the building, 23 fatalities were reported due to smoke inhalation.

== Aftermath ==
=== Investigation ===
An investigation was made by the Chicago Police Department and fire department. The survivors claimed that the fire was started in a plywood wardrobe closet in Room 306 which was unoccupied at the time. Although the actual cause of the fire was unknown, the Police Bureau of Investigation arrested housekeeper Denise Watson, who was charged with multiple counts of arson. It is unclear, however, how the authorities determined that the fire was an act of arson, and the arsonist's motives for starting the fire were never noted. Watson was acquitted in 1977.

The investigation also indicated that the smoke and heat from the fire raced down the corridor and entered rooms where doors were left open. In addition, a window was left open, reducing the amount of smoke and toxic gas entering the chapel area and the lounge room thus preventing further fatalities. Investigators also cited the difficulty of moving elderly patients in wheelchairs to the nearby stairway and the inability of elderly patients of evacuating themselves from the third floor where the fire took place.

=== Fire safety improvements ===
The City of Chicago and the Board of Health made several safety improvements after the fire. These improvements include:

- Installing a sprinkler system in all new and existing nursing homes and that the new sprinkler systems must be connected with the fire alarm system.
- Requiring emergency training for all nursing home staff which includes transporting patients during an emergency, maintaining designated areas for family members and establish a roll call system for nursing home personnel.
- The abolishment of dead-end corridors in nursing home.
- Requiring all nursing home management to have a background check on all nursing home employees.
- A disaster plan and regular emergency drills made by the Board of Health.
- A requirement of residents to wear identification bands.
- Stricter smoking rules were enforced after the fire. Now, residents or visitors must smoke in designated areas supervised by staff.

=== Recent violations ===
- On March 31, 1998, the Illinois Department of Public Health fined Wincrest Nursing Home $10,000 (equivalent to $19,753 in 2025) after a staff member hit an elderly woman with a coffee cup and wet bed linens. After an investigation by the health department and local police, the employee was fired.
- On February 2, 2005, the nursing home was fined $5,000 (equivalent to $8,242 in 2025) for failure to provide adequate supervision after a deranged resident set fire to his room. As of 2005 no hearing date was set for the nursing home.

== See also ==
- List of historic fires
- List of disasters
- Golden Age Nursing Home fire
