= Little Italy, Chicago =

Human settlement in Illinois, United States of America

Coordinates: 41.871°N 87.659°W

Exterior view (in 1909) of the storefront office of P. Schiavone & Son, bankers and steamship agents, located at 925 S. Halsted St.

Little Italy, sometimes combined with University Village into one neighborhood, is on the Near West Side of Chicago, Illinois. The current boundaries of Little Italy are Ashland Avenue on the west and Interstate 90/94 on the east, the Eisenhower Expressway on the north and Roosevelt to the south. It lies between the east side of the University of Illinois Chicago campus in the Illinois Medical District and the west side of the University of Illinois Chicago campus. The community was once predominantly Italian immigrants but now is made up of diverse ethnic and socio-economic backgrounds as a result of immigration, urban renewal, gentrification and the growth of the resident student and faculty population of the University of Illinois Chicago (UIC). Its Italian-American heritage is primarily evident in the Italian-American restaurants that once lined Taylor Street. The neighborhood is home to the National Italian American Sports Hall of Fame as well as the historic Roman Catholic churches Our Lady of Pompeii, Notre Dame de Chicago, and Holy Family.

The recent history of the neighborhood waves of urban renewal, starting with the construction of expressways in the 1950s, the development of UIC in the 1960s, the demolition of public housing in the 1990s and 2000s, and redevelopment of Maxwell Street in the 2000s. Along with these changes, housing prices in the area have risen.

== History ==
While there are several Italian-American communities that thrive within the Chicago metropolitan area, Taylor Street, the port-of-call for Chicago's Italian American immigrants, inherited the title of Chicago's "Little Italy." Taylor Street's Little Italy is part of a larger community area — Chicago's Near West Side. Dominant among the immigrant communities that comprised the Near West Side during the mass migration of Europeans around the start of the 20th century, were Italians, Greeks and Jews. Other ethnic groups vacated the neighborhood beginning in the early 1900s, and only the Italian-American enclave remained as a vibrant community.

Other ethnicities have always been present in the area known as "Little Italy." Nonetheless, the neighborhood was given its name due to the strong influence of Italians and Italian culture on the neighborhood throughout the 19th and 20th century. The Italian population, peaking during the decades of the 1950s and '60s, began declining shortly after the decision to build the University of Illinois in the area was finalized in 1963. However, several Italian restaurants and businesses remain in the formerly prominent Taylor Street corridor.

Italians began arriving in Chicago in the 1850s in small numbers. By 1880, there were 1,357 Italians in the city. By the 1920s, Italian cookery became one of the most popular ethnic cuisines in America, spawning many successful bakeries and restaurants—some of which prospered for generations and continue to influence the Chicago dining scene today. By 1927, Italians owned 500 grocery stores, 257 restaurants, 240 pastry shops, and numerous other food related businesses that were concentrated in the Italian neighborhoods.

The immigration of Italians accelerated throughout the late 19th century and into the early 20th century. Chicago's foreign-born Italian population was 16,008 in 1900 and peaked at 73,960 in 1930. The largest area of settlement was the Taylor Street area, but there were also 20 other significant Italian enclaves throughout the city and suburbs. This was the home of the Genna crime family.

=== The Hull House Neighborhood ===
Jane Addams labeled the community as "The Hull House Neighborhood." One of the first newspaper articles ever written about Hull House acknowledges an invitation sent to the residents of the "Hull House Neighborhood." It begins with the salutation, "Mio Carissimo Amico," and is signed, "Le Signorine, Jane Addams and Ellen Starr." Bethlehem-Howard Neighborhood Center Records further substantiate that, as early as the 1890s, the inner core of "The Hull House Neighborhood" was overwhelmingly Italians. If those were the demographics as early as the 1890s, the flight of other ethnic groups, which began after the start of the 20th century, suggests that virtually the entire community from the Chicago River on the east end out to the western ends of what came to be known as "Little Italy" and from Roosevelt Road on the south to the Harrison Street delta on the north — the inner core of the Hull House Neighborhood, was wall-to-wall Italian from the 1930s through the 1950s.

=== Late twentieth century ===
Little Italy used to encompass a much bigger area, but the construction of the university decimated the neighborhood. Many of the residents in the area were against the idea. Florence Scala, Chicago's legendary Taylor Street activist and longtime Hull House cohort, blamed the board of directors of Hull House for betraying the thriving, vibrant, tight knit neighborhood. Scala accused them of encouraging Daley to go ahead and destroy the neighborhood. In 1963, the trustees of Hull-House accepted an offer of $875,000 for the settlement building. Jessie Binford and Scala took the case to the Supreme Court. The court found in favor of the university and the settlement was closed on March 28, 1963.

Some speculated the reason Daley chose Little Italy as the location for the university was payback, he was unhappy with the area politically and was moving UIC there to break up the Italian neighborhood and their power base. However, the area had voted overwhelmingly in favor of Daley. Following World War II, several developments hindered the cohesion of the community. The construction of the Eisenhower Expressway and the University of Illinois Chicago Medical district forced many to move. The establishment of the Circle Campus of UIC in the 1960s by Mayor Richard J. Daley further dispersed the community. During the construction of the 100-acre (0.40 km^{2}) UIC campus, 200 businesses and 800 homes were bulldozed in Little Italy, with 5,000 residents displaced.

=== Public housing redevelopment ===
University Village was formerly home to several Chicago Housing Authority (CHA) public housing developments. These were grouped under the acronym ABLA. Those developments were: the Jane Addams Homes (first public housing development in Chicago), Grace Abbott Homes, Robert Brooks Homes, Robert Brooks Extension, and Loomis Courts. Most of ABLA razed by the CHA as part of the CHA's Plan for Transformation, a program of demolition and redevelopment as mixed-income housing.

ABLA was demolished in stages in the early 2000s. and is currently being redeveloped as townhouses and condominiums under the name Roosevelt Square. The developer, The Related Companies, has received $9.7 million from the Roosevelt/Racine Tax Increment Financing District.

=== Recent gentrification ===
Rents in the area have risen in the past few decades due to an influx of condominiums, townhouses, and the proximity of Little Italy to UIC and the Loop. An example of this gentrification: in the 1990 census, no homes in the Little Italy sample area were reported to be worth more than $400,000. By contrast, according to the 2000 census, 62 homes were reportedly worth more than $500,000, and 13 of those were worth at least $1 million.

== Landmarks ==
Two of the more significant landmarks of Little Italy were the Catholic churches of Our Lady of Pompeii and Holy Guardian Angel founded by Mother Cabrini. Holy Guardian Angel was the first Italian congregation in Chicago. The parish was established in 1898, and the church was built on Arthington Street in 1899. Due to the burgeoning population, a second major Italian church, Our Lady of Pompeii, was founded in 1911. The Holy Guardian Angel Church was razed for the construction of the expressway system. The Our Lady of Pompeii Church is now the Shrine of Our Lady of Pompeii.

Hull House, Jane Addams' settlement house known for its social and educational programs was also located within the Little Italy area.

In recent years, the National Italian American Sports Hall of Fame (founded in 1977 in Elmwood Park, Illinois) was relocated to a new building in Little Italy.

== Politics ==
Little Italy is currently served by Byron Sigcho-Lopez, alderman of Chicago's 25th Ward, Jason Ervin, of the 28th Ward, and Nicole Lee, of the 11th Ward. The neighborhood is part of Illinois's 7th Congressional District, currently filled by Democrat Danny K. Davis.

== Italian enclaves in Chicago ==
A three-story apartment house and a one-story dwelling in Little Hell in September 1902.

Taylor Street has popularly been known as Chicago's "Little Italy," but several other areas in Chicago have had significant Italian populations. Inner-city enclaves along Taylor Street, Roseland on the Southwest Side and Little Sicily on the Near North Side, as well as enclaves beyond the city limits, such as those in Highwood and Melrose Park, all flourished.

=== Little Sicily or "Little Hell" ===
In the 22nd Ward on the city's Near North Side, a Sicilian enclave known alternately as "Little Sicily" and "Little Hell" was established in an area formerly populated by Scandinavians. It was considered the most colorful Italian neighborhood, and was home to 20,000 Italians by 1920. The neighborhood no longer exists due to the construction of the Cabrini–Green public housing projects on the site during and after World War II. By the mid 1960s, crime and social problems resulting from the housing projects caused many of the earlier residents to leave.

=== Grand Avenue ===
An Italian enclave exists along Grand Avenue to Chicago Avenue between Aberdeen Street and Washtenaw Avenue. As noted by Maureen Jenkins, Staff Reporter for Chicago Sun Times: "You're still likely to hear folks speaking dialects from Sicily and the coastal city of Bari, which stands on the "heel" side of the Italian boot in the Puglia region. In fact, this sliver of Grand—with its private men's clubs and markets where sausage still is made by hand—feels way more "Little Italy" than current-day Taylor Street".

=== Heart of Italy ===
On the city's Lower West Side, a community centered on 24th and Oakley called the "Heart of Italy" or "Little Tuscany" is composed mostly of Northern Italian immigrants. While Taylor Street goes by the popular Little Italy moniker, that designation once belonged to a stretch of decades-old ristoranti on the 2400 block of South Oakley, an area now known as Heart of Italy.

=== North Harlem Avenue ===
Perhaps the largest concentration of Italian businesses and residents in present-day Chicago is located along Harlem Avenue on the Northwest Side and neighboring Elmwood Park.

=== Bridgeport ===
The area from the river to the Dan Ryan, 26th to 39th (excluding the Wentworth Gardens housing project) has a large Italian population, specifically in the eastern portion near Armour Square Park. Located on Shield Ave in the Old Italian American Club, founded by Angelo La Pietra in the early 1980s. The neighborhood is home to several Italian churches, bakeries and restaurants.

== In fiction ==
The 1980 novel Paper Fish by Antoinette "Tina" De Rosa takes place in Little Italy.

== See also ==
- Italians in Chicago
