= The Voyage Out =

1915 novel by Virginia Woolf

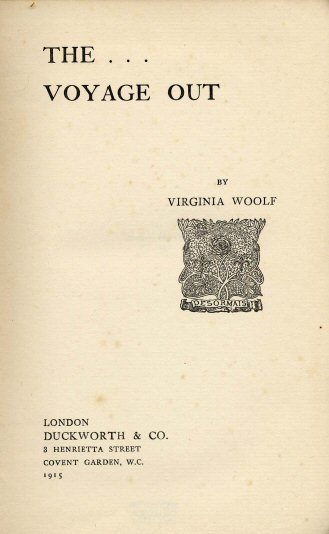
- Cover of the first edition of 1915
- Author: Virginia Woolf
- Language: English
- Genre: Novel
- Publisher: Duckworth
- Publication date: 26 March 1915
- Publication place: United Kingdom
- Media type: Print (hardback & paperback)

The Voyage Out is the first novel by Virginia Woolf, published in 1915 by Duckworth.

== Plot ==
Rachel Vinrace embarks for South America on her father's ship and is launched on a course of self-discovery in a kind of modern mythical voyage. The mismatched jumble of passengers provides Woolf with an opportunity to satirise Edwardian life. The novel introduces Clarissa Dalloway, the central character of Woolf's later novel, Mrs Dalloway. Two of the other characters were modelled after important figures in Woolf's life. St. John Hirst is a fictional portrayal of Lytton Strachey, and Helen Ambrose is, to some extent, inspired by Woolf's sister, Vanessa Bell.

Rachel's journey from a cloistered life in a London suburb to freedom, challenging intellectual discourse and self-discovery very likely reflects Woolf's own journey from a repressive household to the intellectual stimulation of the Bloomsbury Group. Towards the novel's end, Rachel Vinrace dies of a fever.

== Development and first draft ==
Woolf began work on The Voyage Out by 1910 (perhaps as early as 1907) and had finished an early draft by 1912. The novel had a long and difficult gestation; it was not published until 1915, as it was written during a period in which Woolf was psychologically vulnerable. She suffered from periods of depression and at one point attempted suicide. The resultant work contained the seeds of all that would blossom in her later work: the innovative narrative style, and the focus on feminine consciousness, sexuality, and death.

In 1981, Louise DeSalvo published an alternative version of The Voyage Out featuring its original title, Melymbrosia. Professor DeSalvo worked for seven years on the project of reconstructing the text of the novel as it might have appeared in 1912, before Woolf had begun serious revisions. She reviewed more than 1,000 manuscript pages from Woolf's private papers, dating the earlier versions of the work by small organisational clues such as the colour of ink used or noticing where a pen had last left off writing. DeSalvo's Melymbrosia attempts to restore the text of the novel as Woolf had originally conceived it, containing more candid political commentary on such issues as homosexuality, women's suffrage and colonialism. According to DeSalvo, Woolf was "warned by colleagues that publishing such an outspoken indictment of Britain could prove disastrous to her fledgling career". The work was heavily revised until it became the novel now known as The Voyage Out, which omits much of the political candour of the original. DeSalvo's edition was reissued by Cleis Press in 2002.

== Critical reception ==
Writing in 1926, E. M. Forster described it as "... a strange, tragic, inspired book whose scene is a South America not found on any map and reached by a boat which would not float on any sea, an America whose spiritual boundaries touch Xanadu and Atlantis". Reviewing the book a decade earlier, he wrote this: "It is absolutely unafraid... Here at last is a book which attains unity as surely as Wuthering Heights, though by a different path."

Literary scholar Phyllis Rose writes in her introduction to the novel, "No later novel of Woolf's will capture so brilliantly the excitement of youth." And also the excitement and challenge of life. "It's not cowardly to wish to live," says one old man at the end of the book. "It's the very reverse of cowardly. Personally, I'd like to go on for a hundred years... Think of all the things that are bound to happen!"

== Woolf's review copies for USA publication ==
There are two known copies of the first edition that Woolf is known to have used to record her intended alterations ahead of the 1920 re-issue in the USA. The first is in a private collection in the USA.

The second was acquired in 1976, by the University of Sydney, from a bookshop in London. This copy was mis-filed in the science section of the University of Sydney's rare books collection by mistake, as the call number was similar to that collection's numbers. It was re-discovered in 2021 during a re-cataloguing. This copy contains the carbon copies of notes in the other copy but, also and uniquely, Woolf's notes and some deletions (in Chapter 25) written in violet ink. This copy has Woolf's name written on the front flyleaf. The copy has been digitised and published by the university.
