= Umbertina =

1979 novel by Helen Barolini

- First edition
- Author: Helen Barolini
- Language: English
- Subject: Italian-American women Mothers and daughters New York (State)
- Genre: Fiction
- Publisher: Seaview Books
- Publication date: 1979
- Publication place: United States
- Pages: 424
- Awards: Premio Acerbi
- ISBN: 087223536X
- OCLC: 5102077
- LC Class: PZ4.B2642 Um PS3552.A725

Umbertina (1979) is a feminist novel by Helen Barolini. It tells the story of four generations of women in one Italian-American family. It is the first novel by an Italian-American woman which explores, in depth, the connected themes of gender and ethnicity.

== Plot ==
Prologue

The prologue is set in Rome in the 1970s, with Marguerite, an American expatriate, in the office of her psychiatrist. Although living a comfortable middle-class life, Marguerite is floundering, without direction. She often thinks of her maternal grandmother, Umbertina, who had a "primitive strength" that Marguerite envies.

Part One: Umbertina, 1860-1940

At sixteen, Umbertina works as a goatherd in the hills above the Calabrian village of Castagna. She lives with her parents, brothers, and sisters in a one-room, dirt-floored stone cabin. Her father, Carlo Nenci, is a poor tenant farmer who toils for the Baron Mancuso di Valerba, an absentee landlord who takes half of everything produced by the villagers.

One day Giosuè, a charcoal maker from the next village, presents Umbertina with a heart-shaped holder for her knitting needles, which he made himself out of tin. Umbertina likes Giosuè, who has beautiful dark hair and eyes, but her father instead promises her to Serafino Longobardi, an older man who had fought in the Campaign of 1860. Well in advance of the wedding, Umbertina asks the local priest's housekeeper, Nelda, to weave her a matrimonial bedspread in the traditional Calabrian style. It is the one valuable possession she will bring to her new home. She also asks Nelda for some rosemary, hoping that once she is married she will at last have chicken to cook with it. Nelda tells her of an old saying: where rosemary thrives, "the women of that house are its strength."

Serafino buys a small plot of farmland, and Umbertina gives birth to three children. Oppressive taxes, high interest rates, and depleted soil make it impossible to break even. At Umbertina's urging, they decide to emigrate to America. They load their few possessions onto a donkey and, with a few of their neighbors, make their way to Naples where they board a ship for New York. For the next two years, the family lives in an overcrowded Italian ghetto. Umbertina takes in laundry while Serafino works as a laborer. They make the mistake of entrusting their meager savings to a fly-by-night immigrant bank, and are left with nothing. Umbertina sells her bedspread to a social worker, and the family moves to Cato, New York, where some of their old friends from Castagna have settled.

While Serafino labors at the railroad yard, the enterprising Umbertina begins selling freshly made pizza and panini to his co-workers for lunch. As the business expands, she leases farmland to grow fresh produce and opens a grocery store. She gives birth to five more children, including a daughter, Carla. The family business thrives, and the Longobardis become affluent and Americanized. On her deathbed, the elderly Umbertina has a vision of the lost bedspread with its intricately patterned design. Just before she dies, she asks her son for a cup of water from the spring in Castagna.

Part Two: Marguerite, 1927-1973

Carla's daughter Marguerite is restless, searching for something to give her life meaning. After college she travels to Italy, where she meets Alberto Morosini, a poet some twenty years her senior who comes from an old, established Venetian family. Planning to live together as artists, they marry and have two daughters, moving several times between Italy and the United States. While Alberto focuses on his successful writing career, Marguerite's attention is scattered. At forty-two she has an affair with a writer her own age, and uses her literary connections to try to help his career.

Part Three: Tina, 1950-

Marguerite's daughter Tina is living in New York when she receives the news that her mother has died in a car accident. She flies to Rome to be with her family. While still grieving her mother, she learns she is pregnant by her feckless American boyfriend, and endures a painful, illegal abortion. She begins spending time with Jason, a law student from an old, established New England family who is staying in Rome with his diplomat father. (Although Jason is a "Wasp," Tina thinks he looks Italian; his physical appearance echoes that of Giosuè in Part One.)

Tina struggles to choose a path in life. While touring southern Italy with Jason, she runs off with another man and visits her great grandmother's hometown. Unbeknownst to her, she ends up speaking to a descendant of Giosuè, who made the tin heart which she carries with her as a memento. She returns to the United States to continue her classical studies. One day she visits the Statue of Liberty, and in the Museum of Immigration, sees a beautiful Calabrian bedspread. Not realizing it once belonged to her great grandmother, Tina wishes Umbertina had brought something like that with her to America to pass down to her descendants.

Eventually Tina reunites with Jason and they become engaged. Unlike her mother, Tina is now able to commit herself as fully to a career as her fiancé. On a visit to Jason's family home in Wellfleet, Massachusetts—not far from where an Italian bark, the Castagna, was shipwrecked in 1914—she plants rosemary.

== Publication history ==
Barolini began writing about her grandmother in 1969, after traveling to Calabria to research her family's roots. She wrote Umbertina in 1976 after receiving a National Endowment for the Arts fellowship.

Umbertina was first published in hardcover by Seaview Books in 1979 and marketed as a "family saga." Sales were respectable, but within three years the book was out of print. A paperback edition published by Bantam in 1982 was packaged in the style of a romance novel; the cover featured "three women, hair streaming romantically." It was republished by Ayer in 1988, but the type was so small it was nearly illegible. Another paperback edition was published by the Feminist Press in 1999, with an Afterword by Edvige Giunta. An Italian-language edition was published by Avagliano in 2001.

== Reception ==
The novel was initially ignored by reviewers for mainstream publications such as the New York Times. Edvige Giunta attributes this partly to mistakes made by the publishers, and partly to "a literary establishment unable to conceive of a novel dealing with women's experience or Italian American experience as worthy of serious critical attention or a lasting place in American letters."

Umbertina is "the first Italian-American novel by a woman to deal explicitly with the intertwining themes of gender and ethnic identity." It is also unusual in that it details the everyday struggles of working-class immigrants, which have traditionally been omitted from official historical narratives. Literature professor Fred Gardaphé calls it a "seminal" work. Barolini herself describes it as primarily a feminist novel rather than an ethnic novel. It has been included in the curriculum of various university courses in women's studies and Italian-American literature. Barolini received the Americans of Italian Heritage award for Umbertina in 1984 and the Premio Acerbi, an Italian literary prize, in 2008.
