= Castagna, Catanzaro =

Castagna
- Frazione
- Location of Castagna in Italy
- Coordinates: 39°3′16″N 16°26′19″E
- Country: Italy
- Region: Calabria
- Province: Catanzaro (CZ)
- Comune: Carlopoli

Area
  - Total: 0.403 km^{2} (0.156 sq mi)
- Elevation: 825 m (2,707 ft)

Population (October 9, 2011)
  - Total: 543
  - Density: 1,350/km^{2} (3,490/sq mi)
- Demonym: Castagnese
- Time zone: UTC+1 (CET)
  - Summer (DST): UTC+2 (CEST)
- Postal code: 88040
- Dialing code: 0968
- Patron saint: Maria del Carmelo
- Saint day: July 16

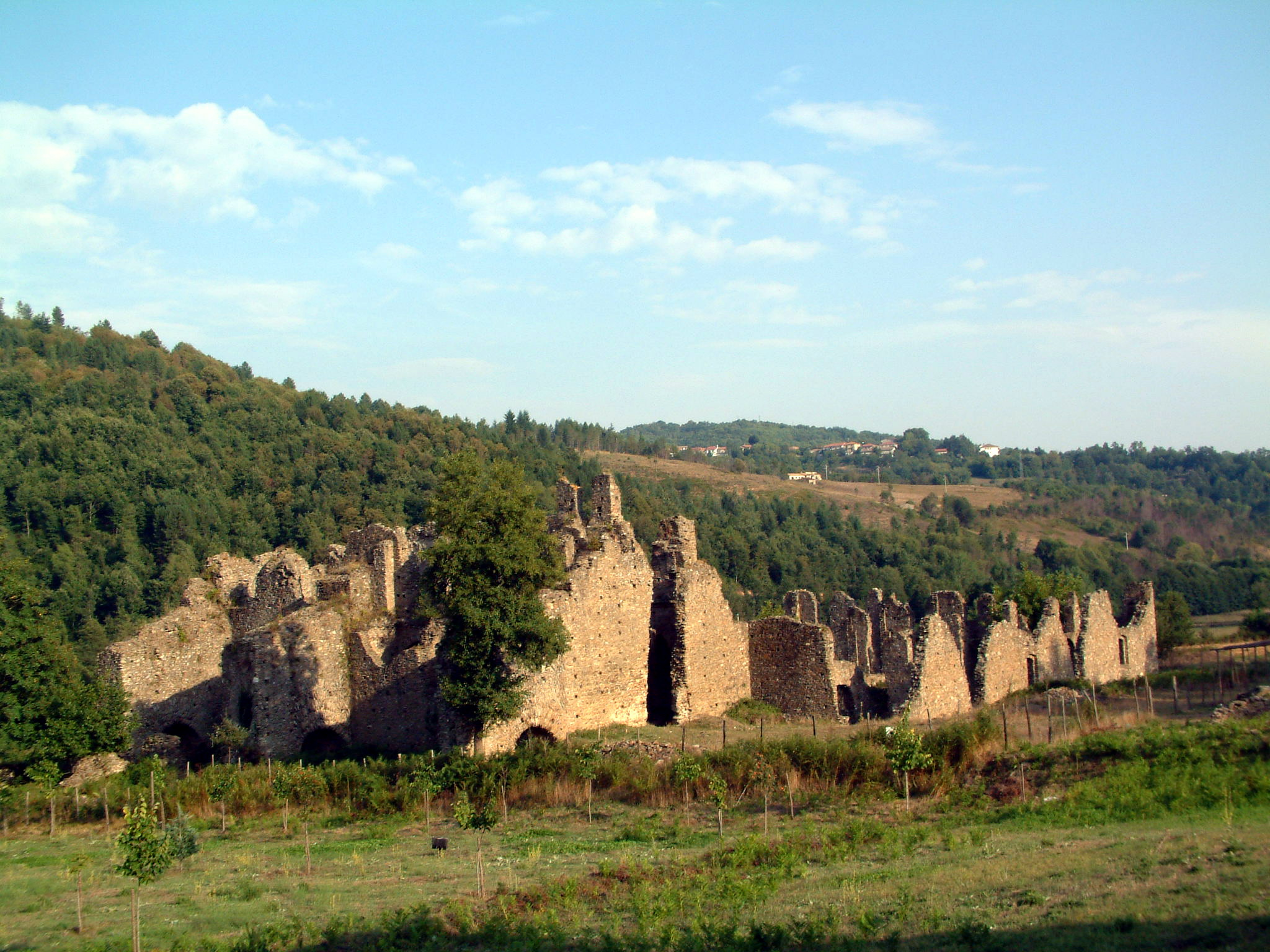
Abbey of Corazzo

Castagna is a small village in Carlopoli of the province of Catanzaro, Region of Calabria, Italy. In the English language, castagna is chestnut. Many Castagnese emigrated in the late 19th and early 20th century. Most inhabitants ended up in Utica, New York and some in Ontario. It is also home to the Abbey of Santa Maria di Corazzo.

== History ==
The mountainous territory of Castagna, located in Sila Piccola, has belonged for many centuries to the University of Scigliano, a farmhouse of Cosenza, in the province of Calabria Citiore. It was once called "Trempa della Castagna". The inhabitants mainly come from the Diano hamlet of Scigliano.

With the dismemberment of Scigliano in 1807, Castagna was assigned to the municipality of Soveria Mannelli, and together with Soveria in 1816, it became part of the newly established province of Calabria Ulterior Second, with the capital at Catanzaro.

On September 23, 1832 Castagna, together with the village Colla, separated from Soveria Mannelli to form an independent municipality, which however did not have a long life. After the unification of Italy, in fact, the provincial council of Catanzaro, finding that the municipal revenues were not enough to cover even the compulsory expenses, in the session of September 25, 1867, he proposed the suppression and the union of the territory of the capital "Castagna" to the municipality Carlopoli, and of the hamlet "Colla" to the municipality Soveria Mannelli. Contrary to expectations, on August 23, 1869, the entire municipal territory was assigned to Carlopoli, including "Colla". The latter fraction, 15 km from Carlopoli and 3.5 km from Soveria, however, returned to Soveria Mannelli with effect from 1 January 1871.

Castagna was part of the Diocese of Martirano until 1818 when, due to the effects of the Pontifical Bull De Usori, following the agreement between the Holy See and the Kingdom of the Two Sicilies, the Diocese of Martirano was suppressed and aggregated to the Diocese of Nicastro. In September 1986, following the revision of the Italian dioceses according to the criterion of civil provinciality, while the parishes of Panettieri (with whom the inhabitants of Castagna shared the parish priest for centuries) passed from the diocese of Nicastro (which, on the occasion, changed its name to "Diocese of Lamezia Terme") in the Archdiocese of Cosenza-Bisignano, the parish of Castagna passed from the diocese of Nicastro to the Archdiocese of Catanzaro-Squillace, because the municipality of Carlopoli belonged to the latter diocese. Subsequently, by decree of 18 September 1989 of the Holy See, the parish of Panettieri has also been added to the diocese of Catanzaro-Squillace, although the municipality of Panettieri is in the province of Cosenza.

In the second half of the 19th century, Emilio Leo created the first Calabrian textile industry in Castagna by exploiting the driving force of the Corace waters; later Leo moved to Soveria Mannelli and in the latter town Lanificio Leo, a factory founded in 1873, continues in the production of fabrics using the ancient nineteenth-century machinery.

== Mayors of Castagna ==
- Antonio Arcuri (1833–1834)
- Ferdinando Scalzo (1834–1835)
- Filippo Scalzo (1836–1839)
- Giuseppe Guzzi (1840–1841)
- Bruno De Fazio (1842–1844)
- Nicola Guzzi (1845)
- Giuseppe Scalise (1846–1848)
- Annibale Graziano (1848–1851)
- Francesco Guzzi (1852–1854)
- Nicola Guzzi (1855–1857)
- Antonio Melino (1858–1859)
- Paolo Le Porte (1860–1864)
- Eugenio Sacchi (1865–1869)

== People ==
- Helen Barolini's maternal grandparents were natives of Castagna. Her novel, Umbertina, is based in part on her grandmother from Castagna. Helen herself was born Syracuse, where many Castagnese also lived.
