= Fra Noi =

- Editor: Paul Basile
- Frequency: Monthly
- Founder: Father Armando Pierini
- Founded: 1960
- Language: English and Italian

Fra Noi (English: Between Us) is a Chicago-based print and online magazine that reports Italian and Italian American issues in Chicago and throughout the Midwestern United States. Articles appear in both Italian and English and cover topics of culture, the Italian language, local news, and history.

Fra Noi was founded in April 1960 as a newsletter for Villa Scalabrini, a home for the elderly founded by the Missionaries of St. Charles. The original editor of Fra Noi was Father Armando Pierini, who served in this capacity until 1985.

Fra Noi later became a tabloid newspaper, and it is currently published as a monthly magazine, along with an online version of the publication.
