= Tina DeRosa =

American poet

- Born: Antoinette Marie De Rosa; October 20, 1944; Chicago, Illinois, U.S.
- Died: February 3, 2007 (aged 62); Park Ridge, Illinois, U.S.
- Education: Mundelein College; University of Illinois at Chicago
- Writing career
- Notable work: Paper Fish (1980)

Tina DeRosa (also De Rosa; 1944–2007) was an American writer best known for her 1980 novel, Paper Fish. She also published poetry, short stories, and creative nonfiction.

== Biography ==
=== Early life and education ===
Tina DeRosa was born in Chicago, Illinois, on October 20, 1944, one of two children of Anthony DeRosa, a police officer, and Sophie (née Norkus) DeRosa. She grew up in Chicago's Little Italy neighborhood, and attended Holy Guardian Angel Grammar School and St. Mary's High School.

As a child, when she realized she could not be a priest or an altar boy, she decided to become a writer. She credited her father, who was artistic himself, with inspiring her.

When she was 17, she and her family were displaced by urban renewal. Over the next four years, she lost her father and her paternal grandmother, an Italian immigrant. She channeled her feelings of grief and loss into her writing.

DeRosa earned a bachelor's degree from Mundelein College in 1966, and a master's degree in English from the University of Illinois at Chicago (UIC) in 1977. She later said in an interview that she felt "completely lost" during her first two years at Mundelein, being one of only about three people from her neighborhood who went to college. At UIC, she taught composition classes while working on her master's thesis.

=== Career ===
After graduating from Mundelein, DeRosa worked briefly as a social worker. She took a secretarial job at the Chicago Tribune, and within three months was writing articles for the newspaper.

DeRosa struggled for eight years, off and on, before completing her autobiographical novel, Paper Fish. Assisted by grants from the Illinois Arts Council and the National Endowment for the Arts, the novel was first published by Wine Press in 1980, and was nominated for the Carl Sandburg Award. An Italian-language edition, Pesci di Carta, was published in 2007.

She was a writer in residence at the Ragdale Foundation from 1977 to 1982. She subsequently published two volumes of poetry and a biography of Bishop John Baptist Scalabrini, and wrote at least one more novel. Her writing has appeared in journals such as MELUS and Italian Americana, and in anthologies such as Helen Barolini's The Dream Book: An Anthology of Writings by Italian American Women (1985). In 1995 she won the Rona Jaffe Foundation Writers' Award. She earned her living at various jobs in the Chicago area, including communications director at the Urban Transportation Center of UIC and administrative assistant and editor for biomedical researchers.

=== Later years and legacy ===
During her final years, DeRosa lived in Park Ridge, Illinois. In 2005, she converted from Catholicism to the Greek Orthodox religion. She died on February 3, 2007, aged 62.

DeRosa is often classified as an Italian-American writer, and Paper Fish in particular is considered an important work of Italian-American literature. DeRosa herself chafed at such labels:

All of the political stuff comes from the critics....I'm a writer who happens to be a woman and happens to be Italian-American. I'm not a feminist. I'm not an Italian-American writer. I'm just Tina and I'm just a writer.

Her papers are on file with the University of Illinois at Chicago library.

== See also ==
- List of Italian-American women writers
- Italians in Chicago
