= Louise DeSalvo =

American writer (1942–2018)

Louise A. DeSalvo (September 27, 1942 – October 31, 2018) was an American writer, editor, professor, and lecturer who lived in New Jersey. Much of her work focused on Italian American culture, though she was also a renowned Virginia Woolf scholar.

== Life ==
Born in Jersey City, New Jersey as Louise Anita Sciacchetano, DeSalvo lived in Hoboken, before moving north to Ridgefield, New Jersey, where she graduated from Ridgefield Memorial High School in 1959.

She earned her undergraduate degree from Douglass Residential College at Rutgers University and earned graduate degrees in English at New York University.

DeSalvo and her husband raised their children in Teaneck, New Jersey, before they moved to Montclair to be closer to their grandchildren.

== Work ==
DeSalvo taught memoir writing as a part of Hunter College's MFA Program in Creative Writing, published over 17 books, and was a Virginia Woolf scholar. She edited editions of Woolf's first novel Melymbrosia, as well as The Letters of Vita Sackville-West and Virginia Woolf, which documents the controversial lesbian affair between these two novelists. In addition, she wrote two books on Woolf, Virginia Woolf: The Impact of Childhood Sexual Abuse on Her Life and Work and Virginia Woolf's First Voyage: A Novel in the Making.

DeSalvo's publications also include the memoir, Vertigo, which received the Gay Talese award and was also a finalist for Italy's Primo Acerbi prize for literature. Vertigo holds as one of the most widely taught Italian American books and has been said to influence almost every Italian American memoir written since. DeSalvo's memoir, Crazy in the Kitchen: Food, Feuds, and Forgiveness in an Italian American Family, was also named a Booksense Book of the Year for 2004. One of DeSalvo's most popular books to date is the writer's guide Writing as a Way of Healing: How Telling Our Stories Transforms Our Lives.

== Biblio ==
=== Major works ===
Reprinted by Feminist Press and translated into Italian by Nutrimenti.

- Vertigo

=== List of works ===
- Virginia Woolf's First Voyage: A Novel in the Making (Rowman & Littlefield Publishers Inc., 1980)
- Nathaniel Hawthorne (Brill Academic Publishers, Incorporated, 1987)
- Casting Off (Prentice Hall / Harvester Wheatsheaf, 1987)
- Virginia Woolf: The Impact of Childhood Sexual Abuse on Her Life and Work (Ballantine Books, 1990)
- Territories of the Voice: Contemporary Stories by Irish Women Writers, Edited By Louise DeSalvo, Katherine Hogan, and Kathleen W. D’Arcy (Beacon Press, 1991)
- Between Women: Biographers, Novelists, Critics, Teachers, and Artists Write About Their Work on Women, Edited by Carol Ascher, Sara Ruddick, and Louise DeSalvo (Routledge, 1993)
- Conceived with Malice: Literature as Revenge in the Lives of Woolf, Lawrence, Barnes, Miller (Plume, 1994)
- Breathless: An Asthma Journal (Beacon Press, 1997)
- Vertigo: A Memoir (Penguin, 1997)
- Adultery: An Intimate Look at Why People Cheat (Houghton Mifflin, 2000)
- Writing as a Way of Healing: How Telling Our Stories Transforms Our Lives (Beacon Press, 2000)
- A Green and Mortal Sound: Short Fiction by Irish Women Writers, Edited by Louise DeSalvo, Katherine Hogan, and Kathleen Walsh D’Arcy (Beacon Press, 2001)
- The Letters of Vita Sackville-West and Virginia Woolf, Edited by Louise DeSalvo and Mitchell Leaska (Cleis Press, 2001)
- Melymbrosia by Virginia Woolf, Edited by Louise DeSalvo (Cleis Press, 2002)
- The Milk of Almonds: Italian American Women Writers on Food and Culture, Edited by Louise DeSalvo and Edvidge Giunta (The Feminist Press at CUNY, 2003)
- Crazy in the Kitchen: Food, Feuds and Forgiveness in an Italian American Family (Bloomsbury, 2005)
- On Moving: A Writer's Meditation on New Houses, Old Haunts, and Finding Home Again (Bloomsbury, 2009)
- Scrivere per stare meglio (Audino, 2011)
- The Art of Slow Writing: Reflections on Time, Craft, and Creativity (St. Martin's Griffin, 2014)

== Awards ==
- Booksense Book of the Year 2004, Crazy in the Kitchen: Food, Feuds and Forgiveness in an Italian American Family
- The Douglass Society Medal for Distinguished Achievement
- Jenny Hunter Endowed Scholar for Creative Writing and Literature at Hunter College
- Gay Talese Award, Vertigo
- The President's Award from Hunter College
