= Our Lady of the Angels School fire =

1958 school fire in Chicago, Illinois

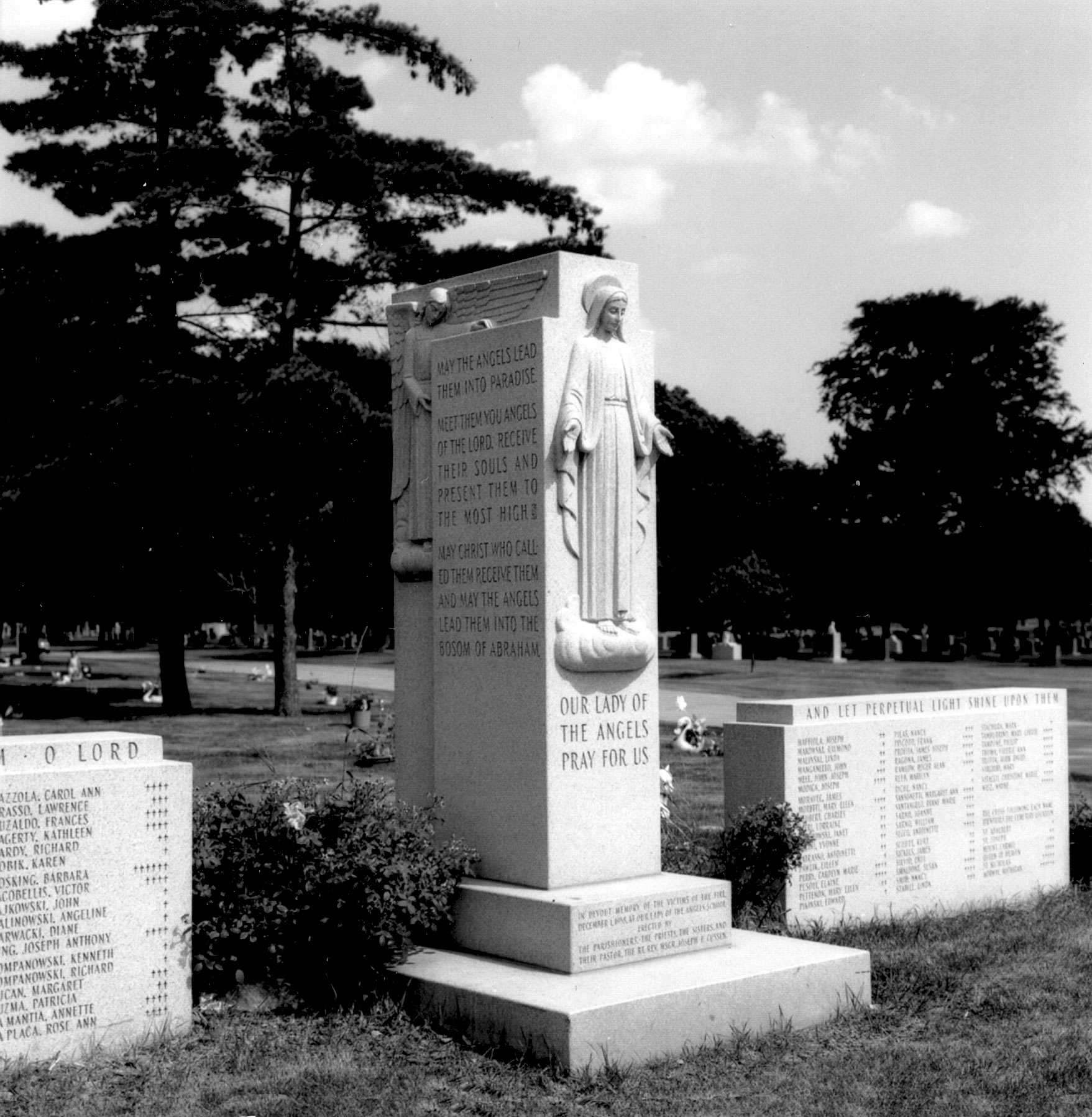
- A monument to the victims at the Queen of Heaven Cemetery
- Location of Our Lady of the Angels School
- Date: December 1, 1958; 67 years ago
- Location: Humboldt Park, Chicago, Illinois; 41°53′51″N 87°43′20″W
- Type: School fire
- Cause: Not officially determined
- Deaths: 95

On Monday, December 1, 1958, a fire broke out at Our Lady of the Angels School in Chicago, Illinois, shortly before classes were to be dismissed for the day. The fire originated in the basement near the foot of a stairway. The elementary school was operated by the Archdiocese of Chicago and had an enrollment of approximately 1,600 students. A total of 92 pupils and three nuns ultimately died when smoke, heat, fire, and toxic gases cut off their normal means of escape through corridors and stairways. Many more were injured when they jumped from second-floor windows which, because the building had a raised basement, were nearly as high above ground as a third floor would be on level ground, approximately 25 feet (7.6 m).

The disaster was the lead headline story in American, European, and Canadian newspapers. Pope John XXIII sent his condolences from The Vatican. The severity of the fire shocked the nation and surprised educational administrators of both public and private schools. The disaster led to major improvements in standards for school design and fire safety codes.

== Background ==
Our Lady of the Angels was a grammar school comprising kindergarten through eighth-grade education. It was located at 909 North Avers Avenue in the Humboldt Park area of Chicago's West Side, on the northeast corner of West Iowa Street and North Avers Avenue (some sources describe the school as "in Austin"). The neighborhood had originally been heavily Irish-American, but gradually developed in the first half of the twentieth century into a largely Italian-American middle-class community. The area was also home to several other first, second, and third-generation immigrant groups, including German Americans, Polish Americans and other Slavic Americans. Most of the families in the immediate neighborhood were Catholic.

The school was one of several buildings associated with the large Catholic parish; others included a church, a rectory, which was adjacent to the church, a convent of the Sisters of Charity of the Blessed Virgin Mary, which was across Iowa Street from the school, and two buildings one block east on Hamlin Avenue referred to by the parish as Joseph Hall and Mary Hall respectively, which housed kindergarten and first-grade classes. The Hamlin Avenue buildings were not involved in the fire, and aside from some minor smoke inhalation problems (no deaths or serious injuries), neither were the first floor of the north wing, the entire south wing, or the annex.

The fire was primarily confined to the second floor of the north wing. The north wing was part of a two-story structure built in 1910, but remodeled several times over the years. That wing originally consisted of a first-floor church and a second-floor school. The entire building became a school when a new, much larger church was opened in 1939. A south wing also dating from 1939 was built and was connected in 1951 by an annex to the north wing. The two original buildings and the annex formed a U-shape, with a narrow fenced courtyard between.

=== Fire prevention and hazards ===
Due to a grandfather clause that did not require schools to retrofit to a new standard if they already met previous regulations, the school legally complied with the State of Illinois and City of Chicago fire codes of 1958 and was generally clean and well-maintained; nonetheless, several fire hazards existed. Each classroom door had a glass transom above it, which provided ventilation into the corridor but also permitted flames and smoke to enter once heat broke the glass. The school had one fire escape. The building had no automatic fire alarm, no rate-of-rise heat detectors, no direct alarm connection to the fire department, no fire-resistant stairwells, and no heavy-duty fire doors from the stairwells to the second-floor corridor. At the time, fire sprinklers were primarily found in factories or in new school construction, and modern smoke detectors did not become commercially available until 1969.

In keeping with city fire codes, the building had a brick exterior to prevent fires from spreading from building to building as in the Great Chicago Fire of 1871. However, its interior was made almost entirely of combustible wooden materials—stairs, walls, floors, doors, roof, and cellulose fiber ceiling tiles. Moreover, the floors had been coated many times with both flammable varnish and petroleum-based waxes. There were only two (unmarked) fire alarm switches in the entire school, and they were both in the south wing. There were four fire extinguishers in the north wing, each mounted 7 ft (2.1 m) off the floor, out of reach for many adults and all of the children.

The single fire escape was near one end of the north wing, but reaching it required passing through the main corridor, which in this case rapidly became filled with suffocating smoke and superheated gases. Students hung their flammable winter coats on hooks in the hallway (there were no lockers). There were no limits to the number of students in a single classroom, and because of the post-World War II baby boom this number sometimes reached as many as 64 students. The school did not have a fire alarm box outside on the sidewalk, the nearest one being a block and a half away. With its 12 ft (3.7 m) ceilings and a basement that extended partially above ground level, the school's second-floor windows were 25 ft (7.6 m) above the ground, making jumping from them extremely risky, exacerbated by the fact that the grade surface under all windows was concrete or crushed rock.

== The fire ==
=== Outbreak and reaction ===
The fire began in the basement of the older north wing between about 2:00 p.m. and 2:20 p.m. CST. Classes were due to be dismissed at 3:00 p.m. Ignition took place in a cardboard trash barrel located a few feet from the northeast stairwell. The fire smoldered undetected for approximately 20 minutes, gradually heating the stairwell and filling it with a light gray smoke that later would become thick and black, as other combustibles became involved. At the same time, it began sending superheated air and gases into an open pipe chase very near the source of the fire. The pipe chase made an uninterrupted conduit up to the cockloft above the second-floor classrooms (see "Evacuation" below).

The smoke began to fill the second-floor corridor, but remained unnoticed for a few minutes. At approximately 2:25 p.m., three eighth-grade girls, Janet Delaria, Frances Guzaldo, and Karen Hobik, returning from an errand, came up a different staircase to return to their second-floor classroom in the north wing (only Delaria would survive the fire). The girls encountered thick grayish smoke, making them cough loudly. They hurriedly entered the rear door of Room 211 and notified their teacher, Sister Mary Helaine O'Neill.

O'Neill got up from her desk and began lining up her students to evacuate the building. When she opened the front door of the classroom moments later to enter the hallway, the intensity of the smoke caused O'Neill to deem it too dangerous to attempt escape down the stairs leading to Avers Avenue on the west side of the building. She remained inside the classroom with her students to await rescue. The fire continued to strengthen, and several more minutes elapsed before the school's fire alarm rang.

About this same time, a window at the foot of the stairwell shattered due to the intense heat, giving the smoldering fire a new oxygen supply. This burst of heat also ignited a 2.5 by 24 feet (0.76 by 7.32 m) roll of material, described by the fire chief in his report as "tarred building paper", stored in the area, which, along with the petroleum-based waxes on the floors, caused the thick, oily black smoke that was believed responsible for so many of the smoke inhalation deaths in the building. The wooden staircase burst into flames and, acting like a chimney, sent hot gases, fire, and very thick, black smoke swirling up the stairwell.

At approximately the same time, the school janitor, James Raymond, saw a red glow through a window while walking by the building. After running to the basement furnace room, he viewed the fire through a door that led into the stairwell. After instructing two boys who were emptying trash baskets in the boiler room to leave the area, Raymond rushed to the rectory and asked the housekeeper to call the fire department. He then ran back to the school to begin evacuation via the fire escape. The two boys meanwhile returned to their class and warned their lay teacher, which prompted her and another teacher to lead their students out of classrooms in the annex area of the second floor. The teachers had looked in vain for the school principal before deciding to act on their own to vacate the school. Unknown to them, the principal was in the other wing, covering a class for an absent teacher.

As they left the building, a teacher pulled the fire alarm, but it did not ring. Several minutes later, after leaving her students in the church, she returned to the school and attempted to activate the alarm again. This time, the alarm rang inside the school, but it was not automatically connected to the fire department. By this time, however, the students and teachers in the north wing classrooms on the second floor were essentially trapped, whether they knew about the fire or not.

Despite Raymond's visit to the rectory soon after 2:30 p.m. to spread the alert, there was an unexplained delay before the first telephone call from the rectory reached the fire department at 2:42 p.m. One minute later, a second telephone call was received from Barbara Glowacki, the owner of a candy store on the alley along the north wing. Glowacki had noticed flames in the northeast stairwell after a passing motorist, Elmer Barkhaus, entered her store and asked if a public telephone was available to call the fire department. Police initially thought this 61-year-old man was a suspect in the blaze until Barkhaus voluntarily came forward and explained himself. Glowacki used her private telephone in her apartment behind the store to notify authorities.

=== Evacuation ===
The first-floor landing was equipped with a heavy wooden door, which effectively blocked the fire and heat from entering the first floor hallways. However, the northeast stairwell landing on the second floor had no fire blocking door. As a result, there was no barrier to prevent the spread of fire, smoke, and heat through the second floor hallways. The western stairwell landing on the second floor had two substandard corridor doors with glass panes propped open (possibly by a teacher) at the time of the fire. This caused further drafts of air and an additional oxygen supply to feed the flames. Two other doors were chained open when they should have been closed; these doors were at the first and second floor levels leading into the annex. The upper door was quickly closed, but the lower one remained open throughout the fire.

As the fire consumed the northeast stairway, a pipe chase running from the basement to the cockloft above the second floor false ceiling had been feeding superheated gases for some minutes on a direct route to the attic. The building's old roof had been re-coated numerous times, and the tar had become very thick. Consequently, the heat of the fire was not able to burn quickly through the roof. If it had, it would have opened a hole that would have served to vent much of the smoke and gases. Eventually, as the temperature continued to rise in the enclosed space, the wood of the cockloft itself flashed over.

The fire then swept down through the hallway ceiling's ventilation grates into the second floor corridor as it flashed through the cockloft above the classrooms. Glass transom windows above the doors of each classroom broke as the heat intensified, allowing superheated gases and thick black smoke in the hallway to enter the classrooms. By the time the students and their teachers in the second floor classrooms realized the danger (and the occupants of several of the rooms, until that moment, did not realize the danger), their sole escape route into the hallway was impassable. The second floor of the north wing had become an impervious fire trap.

For 329 children and five teaching nuns, the only remaining means of escape was to jump from the second floor windows to the concrete or crushed rock 25 ft (7.6 m) below, or to wait for the fire department to rescue them. Recognizing the trap they were in, some of the nuns encouraged the children to sit at their desks or gather in a semicircle and pray. But smoke, heat, and flames quickly forced them to the windows.

One nun, Sister Mary Davidis Devine, ordered her students in room 209 to place books and furniture in front of her classroom doors, and this helped to slow the entry of smoke and flames until rescuers arrived. Out of the 55 students in the room, most escaped unharmed, eight escaped with injuries and two died; Beverly Burda, the last student remaining in the room, evidently passed out from smoke inhalation and died when the roof collapsed. Another student, Valerie Thoma, died at a hospital three months later, on March 5, 1959, as a result of her extensive burn injuries.

=== Rescue ===
Fire department units arrived within four minutes of being called, but by then the fire had been burning unchecked for possibly as long as 40 minutes and was fully out of control. The fire department was initially hampered because they had been incorrectly directed to the rectory address around the corner at 3808 W. Iowa Street. Valuable minutes were then lost repositioning the fire trucks and hose lines. Additional firefighting equipment was summoned rapidly, as the fire situation was quickly upgraded to "five alarm" (all available equipment and units). In 1959, the National Fire Protection Association's report on the blaze exonerated the rapid response of the Chicago Fire Department and its initial priority to rescue pupils rather than merely fight the flames.

The south windows of the north wing overlooked a small courtyard surrounded by the school on three sides, and a 7 ft (2.1 m) high iron picket fence on the fourth side facing Avers Avenue. Because of earlier problems with vandalism, the gate in the fence was routinely kept locked. Firefighters could not get ladders to the children at the south windows without first breaking through the gate. They spent two minutes battering the gate with sledgehammers and a ladder before they managed to smash it by backing a fire truck into it. The locked gate delayed the rescues of rooms 209 and 211.

Firefighters began rescuing children from the second-floor windows, but nightmarish conditions in some of the classrooms had already become unbearable. Children were stumbling, crawling, and fighting their way to the windows, trying to breathe and escape. Many jumped, fell, or were pushed out the windows before firemen on ladders could reach them. Children jumped with their hair and clothes on fire. Some died later as a result of the fall, and several more were seriously injured. Many of the smaller children were trapped behind frantic students at the windows.

Some younger students who managed to secure a spot at a window were then unable to climb over the high window sills, or were pulled back by others frantically trying to scramble out. The temperature continued to increase until a flashover occurred in the hallway and several of the classrooms at approximately 2:55 p.m. Firefighters struggled desperately to pull students and nuns from windows as those classrooms partially filled with screaming children exploded. Firefighters noticed that the white shirts of children in the windows changed color and turned brown.

Shortly after the flashover, a wide portion of the school's roof collapsed over rooms 208, 209, and part of 210, and the massive downward rush of heat likely killed several other students and their teachers in rooms 208 and 210 instantly (Room 209 lost only one child in the room itself, Beverly Burda, who had been overcome by smoke inhalation before the roof collapsed).

Inside the burning school, a quick-thinking nun rolled petrified children down a stairwell when fear made them freeze. Injured students were rushed to five different hospitals, some in the cars of strangers. Priests from the rectory raced to the scene, grabbing frightened students and escorting them through the smoke to the doors. One of the priests, Father Joseph Ognibene, and Sam Tortorice, a parent of one of the students, were able to rescue most of the students in room 209 by passing them through a courtyard window on the second floor into the annex. Janitor James Raymond, though badly injured himself from a deep glass cut on his arm, worked in tandem with Father Charles Hund to open a locked emergency door leading to a fire escape outside room 207. Thanks to their efforts, all of the students and their teacher, Sister Geraldita Ennis, were rescued from the room.

In room 212, which was located at the opposite end of the hallway from the source of the fire, flames did not actually invade the room, but the toxic smoke and heated gases penetrated here as much as in any other second-floor room, and just over half of the 55 students inside and their teacher, Sister Mary Clare Therese Champagne, succumbed to asphyxiation. When the Chicago Fire Department's new "snorkel" unit arrived, this was one of the first rooms that it began pouring water into, lowering the temperature inside the room significantly, and the children who had not asphyxiated were then rescued by firefighters with ladders.

Glowacki took injured children into her candy store beside the school to escape the cold outdoor temperature while they awaited medical attention. Neighbors and parents raced into the school to rescue students on the lower floor or erect ladders outside that proved to be too short for the second floor. 74-year-old Ed Klock suffered a stroke while attempting to assist the children. Residents of houses along Avers Avenue opened their doors to provide sanctuary and warmth for the children.

Local radio and television reports soon broadcast the news across the city. WGN-AM radio broadcast continuous updates of the fire, with Chicago Police Officer Leonard Baldy providing observations from an overhead helicopter. Panicked mothers and fathers left their homes or workplaces and raced to the school. Mothers pleaded to enter the burning structure. A crowd of more than 5,000 anxious parents and onlookers had to be held back by police lines.

This number grew in the late afternoon as news of the disaster spread and bodies of victims were slowly removed by firemen. It was first hoped that fatalities might be relatively low, under the mistaken belief that the fire alarm had been sounded early enough. The toll climbed quickly once the blaze was partially extinguished and firemen were able to explore the building. National television networks interrupted their regular programming to announce details as the scope of the disaster widened.

Between the delayed discovery and reporting of the blaze and the misdirection of the response units to the wrong address, the firefighters arrived too late. Although they rescued more than 160 children from the inferno, many of the students carried out were already dead. Some of the bodies were so badly charred that they broke into pieces while being picked up. In room 212, none of the dead had been burned; the children who perished, as well as their teacher, all died of smoke inhalation.

== Hospitalization ==
On December 5, 1958, 70 were listed as hospitalized, with 13 in critical condition. By December 6, 1958, the death count was 91. By December 9, the death count was 92; 57 people were in the hospital, with 11 of them in critical condition. In the case of the 92nd death, the hospital attempted to save one boy's life with an artificial kidney, at the time the only such one available in Chicago. The 93rd death, of a girl, occurred on December 22, 1958. A girl with burns on more than 65% of her body died on March 5, 1959, making the death count 94, and was buried on March 9. After that death, three students were still hospitalized. The final deceased victim, a boy, died on August 9, 1959.

== Investigation ==
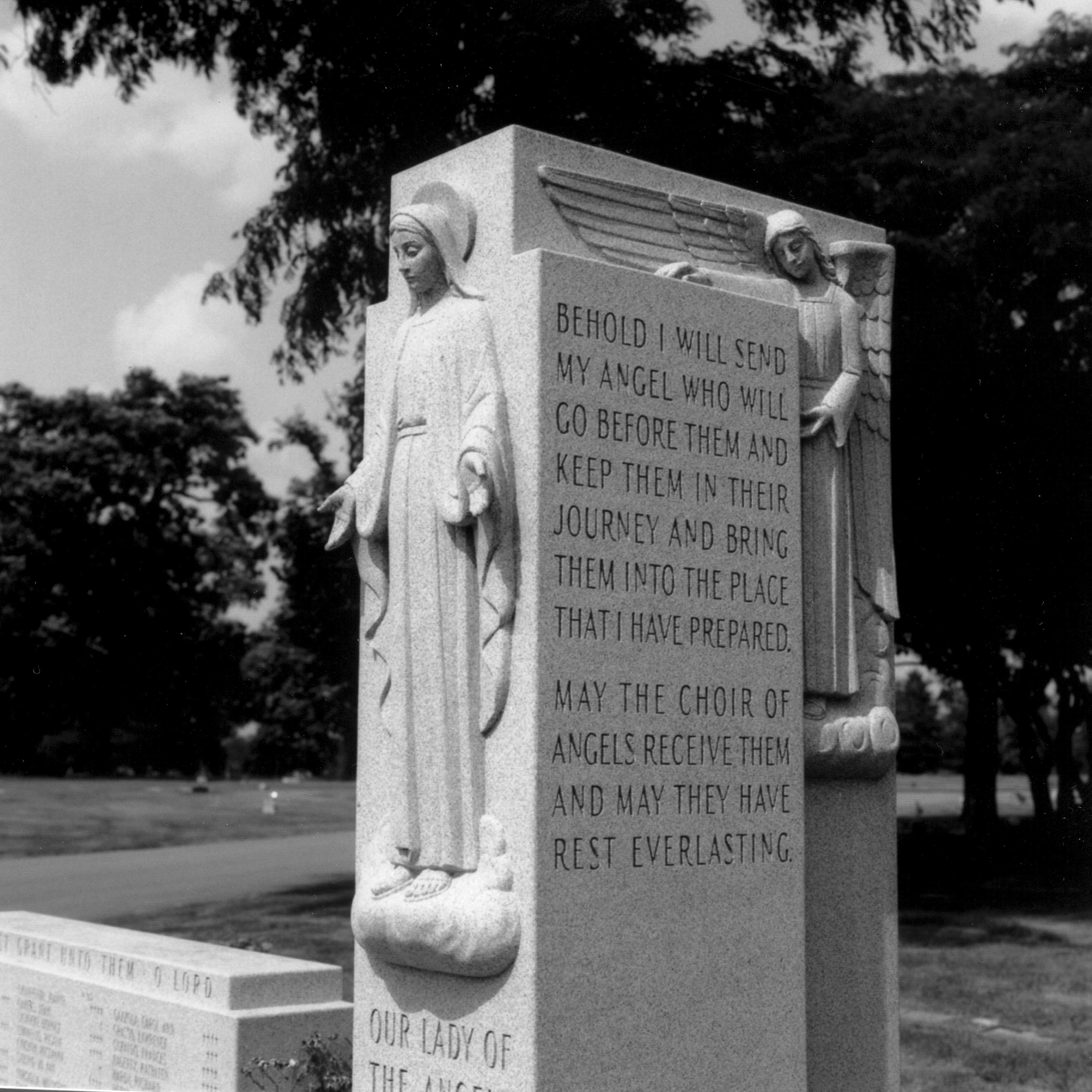
A monument to the victims in the Queen of Heaven Cemetery, by sculptor Corrado Parducci

The cause of the fire was never officially determined. In 1962, a boy, who was a student at Our Lady of the Angels at the time of the fire, confessed to setting the blaze. At the time of the fire, he was 10 years old and in fifth grade. A family court judge later concluded the evidence was insufficient to substantiate the confession. Officially, the cause of the fire remains unknown.

In 1959, the National Fire Protection Association's report on the blaze blamed civic authorities and the Archdiocese of Chicago for "housing children in structures which are 'fire traps,'" such as Our Lady of the Angels School.

Although Our Lady of the Angels School had passed a routine fire department safety inspection weeks before the disaster, the school was not legally bound to comply with all 1958 fire safety codes due to a grandfather clause in the 1949 standards. Existing older schools, such as Our Lady of the Angels, were not required to retrofit the safety devices that were required by code in all schools built after 1949.

== Victims ==
All of the deceased (92 children and three nuns) lived in Chicago and occupied classrooms on the second floor of the north wing. All of those who perished on the day of the fire died when smoke, heat, fire, and toxic gases cut off their means of escape through corridors and stairways. Many more were injured, some severely, when they jumped from second-floor windows.

=== Room 208 ===
Room 208, a room located in the northeast corner of the north wing housing Sister Mary St. Canice Lyng's seventh grade class, had 12 student deaths out of 47 students. Several ladders were placed near Room 208's windows. Of them, the ladder placed by Mario Camerini, a janitor, successfully reached Room 208's windows and allowed several students, including all of the remaining boys, to escape. The three boys died at their desks due to a spurt of heated gases. The conditions of 208 and the three dead boys are depicted in a black-and-white illustration by a Life magazine artist. Sister Mary St. Canice also died.

=== Room 209 ===
Room 209, a room housing Sister Mary Davidis Devine's eighth grade class, had two student deaths. Of all of the students, one, Beverly Burda, died in the classroom, while a second, Valerie Thoma, died in a hospital three months later. The survivors credit Devine's decision to stack books at the door to slow entry of the smoke and an awning that provided an easier jump for their survival. Sam Tortorice, a parent of Room 209 student Rose Tortorice, climbed on the awning to assist the escapes of the Room 209 students. Father Joseph Ognibene joined Tortorice and rescued students. Devine, mistakenly under the impression that all of the students were rescued from the room, agreed to be rescued. By the time Devine and the rescue crews noticed Burda lying in the classroom, conditions made her rescue impossible, and she was killed when the roof collapsed. Devine died on October 14, 2006, at the age of 100.

=== Room 210 ===
Room 210, housing Sister Mary Seraphica Kelley's fourth grade class, had 28 deaths out of the 57 students inside at the time of the fire. Kelley also died, making a total of 29 deaths in Room 210—the most deaths of any of the classrooms. The smaller and weaker bodies of the fourth graders contributed to the high death toll, as many of the children were unable to scale the window ledge. The fire entered the room at a quicker rate since two boys attempted to open the door to the room. Upon discovery of the fire, the flames forced the boys away from the door, preventing closure of the door and allowing the fire to reach the children.

=== Room 211 ===
Room 211, housing Sister Mary Helaine O'Neill's eighth grade class, had 24 deaths out of the 48 students inside at the time of the fire. Normally 63 students occupied the room; at the time, 13 boys helped with a clothing drive at the church and 2 male students stayed home that day due to illness. A picket fence blocked firefighters and hampered the rescue of the middle schoolers in 211. The firefighters could not save all of the students before the room flashed over, killing the remaining students. Sister Mary Helaine O'Neill, the teacher, was severely burned, but survived. She died on September 27, 1975.

=== Room 212 ===
Room 212, housing Sister Mary Clare Therese Champagne's fifth grade class, had 26 deaths out of the 55 students. The deaths were all due to smoke inhalation. Sister Mary Clare Therese also died. Life Magazine's picture of a firefighter carrying the body of ten-year-old John Jajkowski, who died in Room 212, became world-famous and was later used as a fire-prevention poster.

== Responses ==
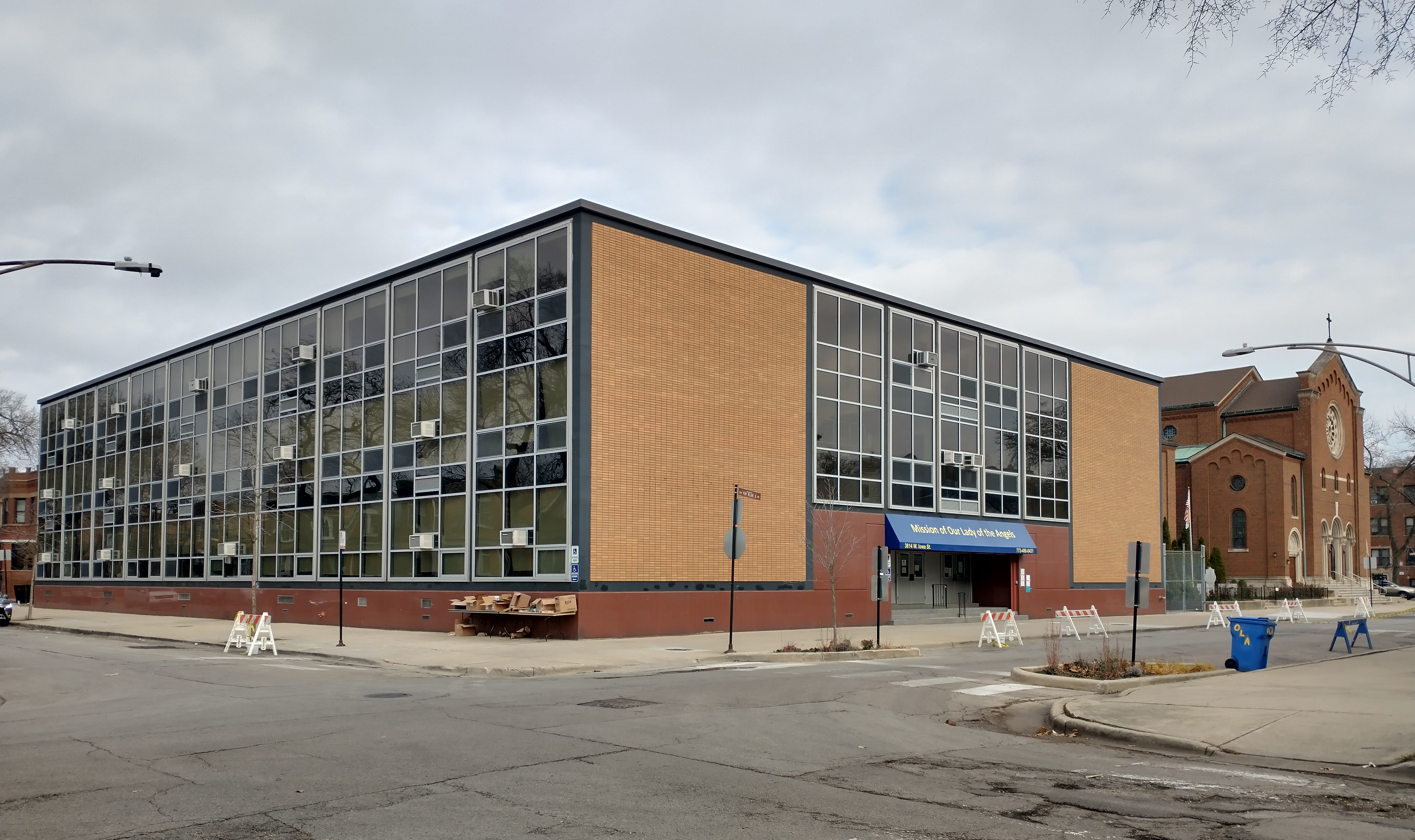
The rebuilt campus of Our Lady of the Angels School

The funeral for the three nuns took place first. A Requiem Mass was offered in Our Lady of the Angels Church after more than 2,000 parishioners paid their respects to the deceased teachers as the closed caskets lay in repose in the convent. A color guard of 100 police officers and firefighters accompanied the coffins into the church. More than 100 nuns from the order of the Sisters of Charity of the Blessed Virgin Mary attended from across Illinois as well as from their Motherhouse in Dubuque, Iowa. The funeral procession had several hundred vehicles. The three teachers were interred side by side in a grave next to other nuns of their religious order at the Mount Carmel Cemetery in suburban Hillside, Illinois.

For 27 of the deceased students whose families accepted the offer to participate in it, a Solemn Requiem Mass and funeral service took place at the Illinois National Guard Armory , abutting Humboldt Park, as each of the parish churches in the archdiocese was not large enough to accommodate the huge crowd. Cardinal Francis Spellman, Archbishop of New York, came to Chicago to lend his support. On December 5, 38 burials took place at Queen of Heaven Cemetery in Hillside.

The families of the other children who were victims of the fire elected to bury their children privately. Many of the young students were buried in the "Shrine of the Holy Innocents" plot at Queen of Heaven Cemetery, which is adjacent to Mount Carmel Cemetery. A monument there lists the names of all 95 victims. Some of the students were buried in other cemeteries: 18 in St. Joseph Cemetery, 18 in St. Adalbert Cemetery, 12 in Mount Carmel Cemetery, 1 in St. Nicholas Cemetery, and 1 in Norway Cemetery in Norway, Michigan.

A relief fund was set up to assist distraught families and to care for injured children in future years. The Chicago metropolitan area rallied to provide support. Hollywood stars such as Jack Benny visited injured children in hospitals. A city newspaper, the Chicago American, devoted its entire front page on December 5, 1958, to photographs of the deceased students under the headline, "Chicago Mourns".

Chicago Mayor Richard J. Daley ordered flags across the city lowered to half staff.

== Legacy ==
Firefighter Richard Scheidt carrying the body of John Michael Jajkowski, Jr. from the school

The fire was the primary current events story in the December 15, 1958, issue of LIFE, containing photographs from the Chicago Sun-Times, Lee Balterman and Art Shay and reconstructed drawings of the events in the classrooms by Franklin McMahon. The first page of the article featured an image of firefighter Richard Scheidt carrying the body of 10-year-old John Michael Jajkowski, Jr. from the building. The photograph of Jajkowski, a fifth grader in Room 212, later served as a fire prevention safety poster nationwide. Jajkowski, an accomplished musician, played the accordion and served as a church choir member, and had expressed a desire to become a priest. Like 25 of his other classmates, Jajkowski was suffocated by black, oily smoke and eventually died. Steve Lasker of the Chicago American took the photograph of Scheidt and Jajkowski as the fire department was beginning to achieve control over the fire.

In particular the fire affected the Italian American community in Chicago.

Carmen Mele, sibling of a fire victim, stated that the OLA community referred to the event as "the fire" with no other words, since "There is no need to introduce the topic with another adjective."

After the Our Lady of the Angels School fire, Percy Bugbee, the president of the National Fire Protection Association (NFPA) said in an interview, "There are no new lessons to be learned from this fire; only old lessons that tragically went unheeded." Sweeping changes in school fire safety regulations were enacted nationwide. Some 16,500 older school buildings in the United States were brought up to code within one year of the disaster.

Ordinances to strengthen Chicago's fire code and new amendments to the Illinois state fire code were passed. The National Fire Protection Association estimated that about 68% of all U.S. communities inaugurated and completed fire safety improvements after the Our Lady of the Angels fire, one of which was an increased number of law-mandated fire drills throughout the academic year. In addition, fire investigators came from as far away as London to study the lessons that could be learned.

The City Council of Chicago passed a law requiring that a fire alarm box be installed in front of schools and other public assembly venues. The interior fire alarm systems of these buildings must be connected to the street fire alarm box. Another requirement was that all schools where it was deemed vital would have sprinkler systems installed. However, nine months later, in September 1959, Fire Commissioner Quinn, when interviewed by WNBQ reporter Len O'Connor, admitted that although 400 of the 1040 schools in Chicago at that time had been deemed in critical need of sprinkler systems, only two actually had sprinklers installed.

OLA students attended classes that were taught by their own teachers in nearby public school facilities, including John Hay School, Rezin Orr School, Ryerson Elementary and Cameron Elementary until the new Our Lady of the Angels School was finished in time for the school year beginning in September 1960.

The ruins of the school were dismantled in 1959 and a new Our Lady of the Angels School, located at 3814 West Iowa Street, was constructed in compliance with the latest required fire safety standards, such as installing a sprinkler system. The modern three-story building with 32 classrooms plus a kindergarten opened in September 1960. Donations from around the world helped to fund the new construction.

As a result of a steady decline in enrollment during the 1990s, the Archdiocese of Chicago closed the school after the class of 1999 graduated. The Chicago Tribune wrote that the fire "knocked the neighborhood off track and prompted an exodus of many families to the suburbs, leaving poverty in their wake." The archdiocese had previously closed the other buildings of the parish in 1990 and merged OLA with the parish of St. Francis of Assisi. The school building now housed the Galapagos Charter School until its 2016 disestablishment; The school building, in 2022, became a multipurpose and outreach center for Mission of Our Lady of Angels, which also remains in operation in the church building next door.

A memorial to the fire was installed at OLA church, moved to Church of the Holy Family in 1999, and reinstalled at OLA church in 2022.

There was a trust established to help fire victims. The funds depleted in 1994. Some survivors were not aware of its existence until shortly before the depletion.

The fire is considered a case study in the 2009 Edition of the NFPA Life Safety Code Handbook.

== Popular culture ==
Some scenes from the 2003 movie Finding John Christmas are based on the OLA fire.

The documentary film Our Obligation, made by the Los Angeles Fire Department, is a dramatization of a "similar" disastrous school fire, explaining all the safety measures that should have been in place and functional. The filmmakers stated that the school in the film is not supposed to be OLA, but most of the details are identical, down to the iconic image of the dead student being carried out by the fireman. Additionally, the school depicted in the film is not a Catholic school like OLA, but a "regular" public elementary school with typical schoolteachers and students. This film was produced in 1959 during fire tests being made at Robert Louis Stevenson Junior High School located at 725 S. Indiana St. in East Los Angeles. The building (built in 1926) was scheduled for demolition due to seismic concerns, so the LAFD used a three-story section for the tests. The school building was replaced with a one-story structure.

The play entitled When Angels Wept by playwright Charles Grippo had two productions in Chicago in 2013 and was based on the Our Lady of the Angels School fire. The story is centered on a small group of survivors of the fire and how the tragedy affected their lives until today.

The fire has been chronicled in several books, including The Immaculate Deception by Robert Chiappetta (Page Publishing, Inc., 2015), The Fire That Will Not Die by Michele McBride (ETC Publications, 1979), To Sleep with the Angels by David Cowen and John Kuenster (Ivan R. Dee, 2003), Remembrances of the Angels by John Kuenster (Ivan R. Dee, 2008), Unwanted by Mary E. Sandford (Ambassador International, 2019) and a 2003 Emmy-winning television documentary, Angels Too Soon, produced by WTTW Channel 11 Chicago. The History Channel also featured the disaster in the television documentary Hellfire, which was an episode in the cable network's "Wrath of God" series.

One of the students who survived the fire was 8-year-old third-grader Jonathan Friga, who would go on to fame as Jonathan Cain, keyboard and rhythm guitarist for the rock band Journey. Cain later referenced the fire in the lyrics of the Journey song "Ask the Lonely":

As you search the embers
Think what you've had, remember
Hang on, don't you let go now.

== See also ==
- Collinwood school fire
- New London School explosion
- Bath Consolidated School
- Italians in Chicago
