= Our Lady of the Angels School (Illinois) =

Roman Catholic school in Chicago, Illinois, U.S.

Coordinates: 41.8975°N 87.7221°W

Our Lady of the Angels School was a Roman Catholic elementary and middle school located in the Humboldt Park section of Chicago, Illinois, United States. Some sources describe the school as "in Austin".

The school was operated by the Roman Catholic Archdiocese of Chicago and served as the parish school of the Our Lady of the Angels Church.

The school is best known for the fatal Our Lady of the Angels School fire, which occurred on December 1, 1958. The fire killed 92 students and three nuns and led to fire safety consciousness in private and public schools in the United States.

The Chicago Tribune stated that the parish and its school "once symbolized the dedication and devotion of Chicago’s largely European immigrant communities."

== The first school building: history prior to the 1958 fire ==
Our Lady of the Angels was an elementary and middle school comprising kindergarten through eight grades. It was located at 909 North Avers Avenue in the Humboldt Park area on the West Side of Chicago, at the intersection of West Iowa Street.

The area was originally mostly Irish American, but slowly became mostly Italian American by 1958. As the community changed its ethic composition in that way, the school did too. The area was a majority middle class community; the community held several second and third generation immigrant groups, including, in addition to Italian Americans: Polish Americans, Irish Americans, and German Americans. Most members of the community were Roman Catholics. There were some Mexican American members of the OLA community. Some students and parents in the community had little English fluency. The nuns who gave instruction were mostly made up of Irish Americans and Irish citizens.

The facility was part of a large Roman Catholic parish which also consisted of a church, rectory, convent of the Sisters of Charity of the Blessed Virgin Mary, and two other parish halls. The school was the educational home to approximately 1,600 students.

In 1903, a two-story parish school was built, with four classrooms on the first floor and a chapel and convent on the second. The school opened in September 1904, and in 1905, the second-floor chapel and convent was converted into two classrooms for the seventh and eighth grades. In 1910, a second two-story building was built north of the original structure, at 909 North Avers Avenue; this brick and timber-joist structure with a wooden interior was in the "Old English" architectural style, with a basement a half-story above the street, a church on the first floor and 12 classrooms on the first and second floors. This building was dedicated on June 19, 1911, by Archbishop James Edward Quigley.

From 1939, a large new church seating more than 1100 parishioners was built together with a three-story brick rectory. When the new buildings were completed in April 1941, the church on the first floor of the 1910 building was converted into classrooms and a new chapel was built in its basement. In 1953, a two-story annex was built, connecting the 1910 building, which became the north wing of the school, with the older 1903 building, which became the south wing.

As the Baby Boom post-World War II occurred, the school became overcrowded, with enrollment at around 1,500 in the 1950s; classroom sizes went up to 60. Students were required to wear school uniforms, with female students wearing blouses colored white and jumpers (called "pinafore dresses" outside of the United States), and male students wearing neckties with dress clothing. Mary St. Florence Casey (died 1965 at age 71) served as principal from 1952 to 1959, including during the fire. Medical reasons prompted her to leave her position. In the 1958-1959 school year, the initial enrollment was 1,635, with about 1,200 of them attending classes in the Avers Street Building. On the morning of December 1, 1958, the school had 20 BVM nuns and nine female lay teachers; no teachers were male.

=== Our Lady of the Angels School fire ===
On December 1, 1958, a fire in the north wing of the school killed 92 students and 3 nuns and injured numerous others. The remains of the north wing, together with the surviving sections of the school building, were demolished in 1959.

== The new school building ==
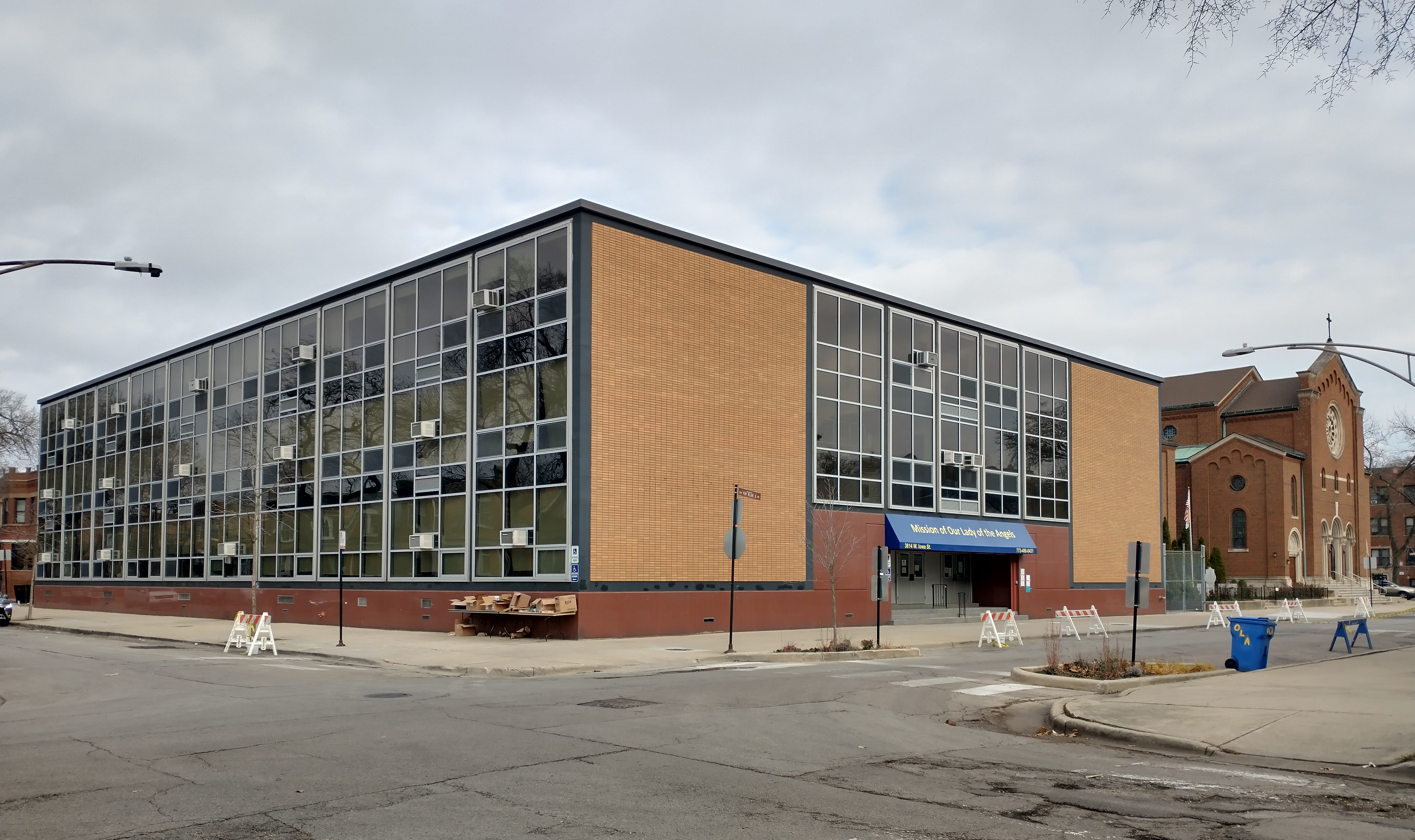
The rebuilt campus of Our Lady of the Angels School

In 1959–1960, a new Our Lady of the Angels School, designed by the Chicago architectural firm of Barry and Kay, was constructed according to the latest required fire safety standards; safety features included enclosed stairways, automatic sprinkler and alarm systems, and the use of fireproof coatings on doors instead of flammable paint and varnish. The only wooden element of this facility was the doors. A new address of 3814 West Iowa Street, located on the south side of the building, was used in order to distance the school from the fire.

Prior to the rebuilding, Our Lady of the Angels students attended various "replacement" schools to finish the school year while the new Our Lady of the Angels School was under construction. Classes were to resume on December 9, 1958, with students attending in shifts at Our Lady Help of Christians School.

Catholic schools that took some Our Lady of the Angels students include:

- Our Lady Help of Christians School (Since closed)
  - Located in Austin, it had more than 1,200 OLA students as of December 10, 1958.
- Our Lady of Grace School
- St. Peter Canisius School (Since closed)

Chicago Public Schools (CPS) campuses that took some Our Lady of the Angels students include:

- Daniel R. Cameron School (Cameron has similar construction to the former Our Lady of Angels School)
- John Hay Elementary School
- Rezin Orr School (now Brian Piccolo Specialty School)

In September 1960, the modern three-story building with 34 classrooms plus a kindergarten opened. Donations from around the world helped to fund the new construction. 1,560 students were enrolled at the new school that first year.

Kelly Hall, a 20,000-square-foot (1,900 m^{2}) facility for the parish, opened to commemorate the deceased. It opened circa 1966.

=== Later history and enrollment decline ===
Enrollment at the new Our Lady of the Angels School remained steady at around 1,500 students until the end of the 1960s. In November 1968, a parish social hall or "fun building" was opened to host supervised after-school activities. By 1971, demographic changes in the population of the city’s west side reduced the number of students, with enrollment falling to 878 and the school beginning to experience serious financial problems. The demographic shifts led to an increasing number of Black students attending Our Lady of the Angels at the same time; the school did not experience any racism-related issues, however, and all of its students were then still Catholic. Still, the cohesiveness of the parish weakened, with the number of registered families falling from 4,500 to 3,800. In subsequent years, Catholic residents began to move to the northwest side of Chicago or to the western suburbs. Blockbusting had contributed to the change in the neighborhood.

A mural on OLA's Kelly Hall, 30 feet (9.1 m) by 70 feet (21 m), by Deborah Mel Taylor and Renee Mahjeune, was unveiled in September 1977. Titled, "Phoenix," it shows children of various races playing with one another. It references both the OLA school fire and a fire at a Baptist church. It took two months to make.

In 1989, the St. Francis of Assisi School merged into Our Lady of the Angels. In 1990 the Our Lady of the Angels church merged into the St. Francis of Assisi Church (at 932 North Kostner). The Our Lady of the Angels parish buildings closed on December 31, 1990, as the parish staff moved to the Francis of Assisi Church location. St. Francis of Assisi received the former OLA church community.

=== School closure ===
By the 40th anniversary of the school fire, Our Lady of the Angels mostly educated Black and Hispanic children from preschool to 8th grade, and had a severely diminished enrollment of 130 students, only about 26 of whom were Catholic. Due to the steep decline in the number of students, the Archdiocese of Chicago closed Our Lady of the Angels School once the Class of 1999 graduated. The closing date was June 30, 1999. The final graduating class dedicated a historic marker and fire memorial within the school. Due to the conflict between church and state property, this religious statue and pedestal have since been removed to the Holy Family Church.

In 2001, Kelly Hall became disused.

At first the Nuestra America Charter High School opened in the former Our Lady of the Angels building. Nuestra America closed in 2002. The building was subsequently leased to Galapagos Charter School until it also closed in June 2016, citing financial pressures. The school had 236 students when it closed.

Circa 1992 to 2012, another church leased the OLA church building. In 2009, the YMCA began operating in Kelly Hall in a partnership with the archdiocese. The Our Lady of the Angels Church building had another dedication in 2012. Renovations on that building had an estimated cost of $2,200,000, but money was not spent as volunteer work had the renovation done. The time done for the renovation was one month short of one year.

In 2017 the Mission of Our Lady of the Angels began work to turn the former school building into a multipurpose facility: dormitories for retreats and volunteers, offices, a kitchen, a center for outreach efforts, and food pantry facilities. The renovations finished in 2022. That year, the memorial was moved back to the OLA church building.

== Notable alumni ==
- Jonathan Cain
