= West Virginia literature =

The literature of West Virginia, U.S.A., includes fiction, poetry, and nonfiction. Representative writers include Pearl S. Buck, Rebecca Harding Davis, Keith Maillard, and Melville Davisson Post. Mary Lee Settle was also said to have left an indelible mark on West Virginia literature.

West Virginia's literary history predates statehood in 1863 and includes journalism, historical writing, social realism, historical fiction, short stories, poetry, memoir, and children's literature. The state's literary tradition has been shaped by writers whose work addresses industrialization, coal mining, rural communities, migration, class, regional identity, and changing relationships with place. Scholarship on West Virginia has also examined the importance of place, home, outmigration, loss, power, and resistance in the formation of Appalachian identity.

== History ==
=== Early and nineteenth-century writing ===
The origins of West Virginia's literary tradition precede the creation of the state. Anne Royall, who spent part of her early life at Sweet Springs in present-day Monroe County, became a journalist and travel writer. After losing much of her inheritance, she travelled widely and published 11 volumes describing people and places across the United States. She later founded the Washington newspapers Paul Pry and The Huntress.

Martin Delany, born free in Charles Town in 1812, became an abolitionist writer, newspaper editor, physician, and political activist. He founded and edited the abolitionist newspaper The Mystery and later worked with Frederick Douglass on The North Star. Delany's writings included The Condition, Elevation, Emigration, and Destiny of the Colored People of the United States and the antislavery novel Blake; or, The Huts of America, which appeared in serialized form during the nineteenth century.

David Hunter Strother, born in Martinsburg, developed a national reputation as an illustrator and travel writer under the pen name Porte Crayon. West Virginia's early historical literature also included works by Joseph Doddridge, Alexander Scott Withers, Wills De Hass, and John P. Hale, whose books documented frontier settlement and conflict in western Virginia.

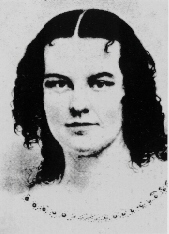
Rebecca Harding Davis, a nineteenth-century writer associated with Wheeling and early American social realism.

Rebecca Harding Davis became one of the state's most significant nineteenth-century literary figures. Born in Pennsylvania in 1831, Davis moved with her family to Wheeling while still a child. After completing her education, she returned to Wheeling and developed her writing while working for the Wheeling Intelligencer.

Davis published Life in the Iron Mills anonymously in The Atlantic Monthly in 1861. The story depicts industrial workers in a factory town based on Wheeling and is regarded as an important early work of American social realism. Recent scholarship has examined the story through the movement of iron, industrial labor, regional space, mobility, and environmental toxicity.

=== Twentieth-century development ===
West Virginia literature expanded considerably during the twentieth century. Writers used fiction, poetry, memoir, children's literature, and historical narrative to represent both rural and industrial life. The period produced writers including Mary Lee Settle, Davis Grubb, John Knowles, Breece D'J Pancake, Denise Giardina, Jayne Anne Phillips, Cynthia Rylant, and others.

Mary Lee Settle, born in Charleston in 1918, developed one of the most sustained fictional treatments of West Virginia history. Her five-volume Beulah Quintet follows generations of characters across several centuries. O Beulah Land concerns settlement before the American Revolution, while The Scapegoat addresses the early twentieth-century West Virginia Mine Wars. The Killing Ground, published in 1982, completed the sequence by bringing its fictional community into the modern period.

Later fiction increasingly addressed the coalfields and their labor history. Denise Giardina, a native of Bluefield who grew up in coal-mining communities, wrote the novels Storming Heaven and The Unquiet Earth about Appalachian mining communities and their social and political conflicts. Literary scholarship on Storming Heaven has examined physical exhaustion and mine labor as elements of the novel's treatment of social justice.

The historical setting behind such writing includes major events in West Virginia labor history. Scholarship on the Battle of Blair Mountain has emphasized the ethnic and racial diversity of miners who participated in the 1921 uprising and has reconsidered the conflict as part of a multiracial labor history.

== Major writers and representative works ==
=== Rebecca Harding Davis ===
Rebecca Harding Davis is closely associated with the development of social realism in West Virginia literature. Life in the Iron Mills drew on the industrial environment of Wheeling and focused on workers living under difficult social and economic conditions. Modern criticism has extended interpretation of the story beyond class by examining regional mobility, the circulation of industrial materials, and the environmental effects of iron production.

=== Denise Giardina ===
Denise Giardina represents a later tradition of historical fiction centered on the Appalachian coalfields. Her childhood in West Virginia coal towns influenced novels such as Storming Heaven and The Unquiet Earth. Storming Heaven places fictional characters within the conflicts surrounding coal companies, mine workers, communities, and organized labor. Fennell's analysis treats exhaustion as both a consequence of mining work and part of the novel's representation of social injustice.

=== Breece D'J Pancake ===
Breece D'J Pancake developed a small but influential body of short fiction rooted in West Virginia. Born in South Charleston in 1952 and raised in Milton, he developed an early interest in local history and the stories of older residents. He later studied at West Virginia Wesleyan College, Marshall University, and the University of Virginia's creative writing program.

Pancake's stories frequently depict working-class characters, economic limits, damaged environments, movement, and attachment to place. Literary scholar Sven Cvek describes Pancake as both Appalachian and West Virginian and interprets his fiction through regionalism, class, capitalism, environmental themes, and the experience of economic peripherality. Pancake died in 1979, and his principal collection, The Stories of Breece D'J Pancake, was published posthumously in 1983.

=== Pearl S. Buck ===
Pearl S. Buck occupies a different position within the state's literary history because much of her best-known writing developed from her life in China. She was born Pearl Comfort Sydenstricker in Hillsboro, Pocahontas County, in 1892 and later became the first American woman to receive the Nobel Prize in Literature, in 1938.

Buck also worked as a translator between Chinese and English literary traditions. Scholarship on her translation of the Chinese novel Shui Hu Zhuan, published in English as All Men Are Brothers, argues that the translation influenced her later literary career, subject matter, and prose. Her career therefore gives West Virginia literary history a transnational dimension alongside the state's more regionally focused traditions.

== Major themes and regional identity ==
=== Place, home, and migration ===
Place is a recurring concern in scholarship connected with West Virginia. Beth Nardella's study of power and resistance in the state argues that Appalachian identity is often place-based and that outmigration makes relationships with home more complex. Memories of home, loss, departure, and regional attachment remain important to people who leave the state as well as those who remain.

This concern with place also appears in West Virginia fiction and memoir. The state's literary survey identifies works by writers including Breece D'J Pancake, Jayne Anne Phillips, Richard Currey, Pinckney Benedict, Louise McNeill, Cynthia Rylant, Henry Louis Gates Jr., Mary Lee Settle, and Homer Hickam as examples in which West Virginia places and experiences shape literary narratives.

=== Coal, labor, class, and environment ===
Coal mining, industrial labor, class, and environmental change form another major group of subjects. Giardina's Storming Heaven uses the coalfields and conflicts between miners and industrial power as its historical setting, while critical scholarship has examined the relationship between labor, physical exhaustion, and social justice in the novel.

Pancake approaches related problems through shorter and more intimate fictional forms. His stories focus on people with restricted economic choices and on communities located at the edges of larger systems of capital accumulation. Cvek argues that class and environmental themes are central to Pancake's regionalism and to his representation of Appalachia as an economically peripheral region.

== Literary forms, language, poetry, and fiction ==
West Virginia literature includes several forms beyond the novel and short story. Poetry, memoir, children's literature, historical writing, mystery fiction, journalism, and travel writing all form part of the state's literary history.

Regional language requires careful treatment because Appalachian English is not one uniform dialect. Linguists J. Daniel Hasty and Becky Childs found subregional variation among Appalachian speakers, including differences between northern and southern Appalachian communities in reported use and recognition of linguistic features. West Virginia literary language is therefore better considered through individual writers and communities than through a single idea of an "Appalachian dialect."

Poetry became increasingly prominent during the twentieth century. Louise McNeill gained recognition with Gauley Mountain in 1939 and later served as West Virginia's poet laureate. Irene McKinney served as poet laureate from the 1990s until her death in 2012 and published collections including Quick Fire and Slow Fire, Six O'clock Mine Report, and Vivid Companion. Marc Harshman succeeded McKinney as poet laureate in 2012 and has worked as a poet, storyteller, and children's author.

Children's literature also expanded during the later twentieth century. Cynthia Rylant drew extensively on her childhood in rural West Virginia, while Jean Lee Latham and Betsy Byars were among West Virginia-associated writers who received the Newbery Medal. The state's literary survey also identifies Marc Harshman, Anna Egan Smucker, Cheryl Ware, and other writers as contributors to children's literature.

== Contemporary and diverse voices ==
Later West Virginia writing includes authors working across fiction, memoir, poetry, children's literature, and nonfiction. Writers such as Jayne Anne Phillips, Richard Currey, Pinckney Benedict, Cynthia Rylant, Henry Louis Gates Jr., Homer Hickam, and Marc Harshman represent different relationships to the state and different literary forms. Their work broadens the range of subjects associated with West Virginia beyond coalfield fiction alone.

Recent Appalachian studies scholarship has also examined forms of regional identity that older stereotypes often overlooked. Maxwell Cloe's study of the Queer Appalachia Project examines the production and circulation of queer Appalachian self-representation. Alexander Menrisky has examined queer Appalachian literary culture through food writing and literary recipes, connecting literary form with sexuality, race, class, environment, domestic life, and regional belonging.

Disability has likewise become part of recent Appalachian cultural criticism. Rebecca Eli M. Long examines disability and regional identity as connected elements in the cultural construction of Appalachia. Scholarship on the Battle of Blair Mountain has also emphasized the multiracial character of West Virginia's mining workforce and labor movement, complicating older representations of Appalachian history as socially uniform.

== Literary institutions, archives, and preservation ==
Libraries, archives, and university collections preserve much of the documentary record used to study West Virginia and Appalachian literature. The West Virginia University West Virginia and Regional History Center maintains an Appalachian Collection of more than 12,000 volumes covering the 13-state Appalachian region. Its holdings include literature, poetry, stories, nonfiction, oral histories, journals, and research materials on subjects including coal mining, pollution, poverty, folk customs, social conditions, and regional culture.

Oral-history preservation also contributes to the study of Appalachian identity and cultural memory. The Appalachian Oral History Project collected thousands of interviews in Central Appalachia beginning in the 1970s, including a substantial body of interviews with Black residents. Scott Sikes's study of the project examines digitization, archival preservation, Black Appalachian identity, and the ways communities respond to historical recordings made in their own region. Such archival collections provide primary material for research on literature, labor, race, language, folklore, publishing, and regional memory.

== See also ==
- List of newspapers in West Virginia
- Appalachia § Literature
- Category:West Virginia in fiction
- Southern United States literature
- American literary regionalism
- Category:Libraries in West Virginia

== Bibliography ==
- Mary Meek Atkeson; James Morton Callahan (1913). "Development of Literature in West Virginia". Semi-Centennial History of West Virginia. Semi-Centennial Commission of West Virginia. pp. 563–568.
- Lucian Lamar Knight, ed. (1913). "Fifty Reading Courses: West Virginia". Library of Southern Literature. Vol. 16. Atlanta: Martin and Hoyt Company. p. 226. hdl:2027/uc1.31175034925258 – via HathiTrust.
- Elsie Dershem (1921). "West Virginia". Outline of American State Literature. Lawrence, Kansas: World Company. pp. 179–183 – via Internet Archive.
- Mary Meek Atkeson (1922). Study of the Literature of West Virginia, 1822-1922. Washington DC.
- Ella May Turner, ed. (1923). Stories and Verse of West Virginia. Hagerstown, Md.
- Warren Wood (1926). Representative Authors of West Virginia.
- Charles Carpenter (April 1935). "The 'First" Books of West Virginia". West Virginia Review. 12.
- Innis C. Davis; Emily Johnston (1939). "Titles of Books Written by West Virginians and Those Printed in West Virginia". Biennenial Report of the State Department of Archives and History. Charleston, WV.
- Harriet W. Pierson (1940). Literature and Poetry of the Locale of West Virginia.
- Federal Writers' Project (1941). "Literature". West Virginia: a Guide to the Mountain State. American Guide Series. New York: Oxford University Press. pp. 144–150. ISBN 9781595342461 – via Google Books.
- Otis K. Rice (July 1953). "West Virginia Printers and their Work, 1790-1830". West Virginia History. West Virginia Historical Society. ISSN 0043-325X.
- Charles H. Ambler; Festus P. Summers (1958). "Pioneering in Literature and Education". West Virginia, the Mountain State (2nd ed.). Prentice-Hall. pp. 156–167. hdl:2027/mdp.39015014737517 – via HathiTrust. + Literary Scene pp. 506–520. (Fulltext)
- Delf Norona (1958). West Virginia Imprints, 1790-1863: a Checklist of Books, Newspapers, Periodicals and Broadsides. Moundsville, WV: West Virginia Library Association. OCLC 863601 – via Internet Archive.
- Charlotte Coulthard Reed (1962). West Virginia Poetry since 1913, a Bibliography.
- Virginia Foulk (April 1964). "Women Authors of West Virginia". West Virginia History. 25.
- Vito J. Brenni (1968). Joyce Binder (ed.). West Virginia Authors: a Biobibliography. Morgantown, WV: West Virginia University.
- Jim Comstock, ed. (1974). Stories and Verse of West Virginia. (Anthology)
- Kitty B. Frazier (1979). West Virginia Women Writers 1822-1979. (Bibliography)
- Harold M. Forbes (1981). "Literature" (PDF). West Virginia History: A Bibliography and Guide to Research. West Virginia University Press.
- Gordon Simmons (4 February 2014). "Literature". West Virginia Encyclopedia. Charleston, WV: West Virginia Humanities Council.
- Joseph M. Flora; Lucinda Hardwick MacKethan, eds. (2001). "Literature of West Virginia". Companion to Southern Literature: Themes, Genres, Places, People, Movements, and Motifs. Louisiana State University Press. p. 957. ISBN 978-0-8071-2692-9.
