= Feminist Press =

American publishing house in New York City

- Parent company: City University of New York
- Founded: 1970
- Founder: Florence Howe
- Country of origin: United States
- Headquarters location: CUNY Graduate Center, 365 Fifth Ave. New York City
- Distribution: Consortium Book Sales & Distribution (US); Turnaround Publisher Services (UK)
- Publication types: Books
- Official website: feministpress.org

The Feminist Press at CUNY is an American independent nonprofit literary publisher of the City University of New York, based in New York City. It primarily publishes feminist literature that promotes freedom of expression and social justice.

The press publishes writing by people who share an activist spirit and a belief in choice and equality. Founded in 1970 to challenge sexual stereotypes in books, schools and libraries, the press began by rescuing “lost” works by writers such as Zora Neale Hurston, Charlotte Perkins Gilman and Rebecca Harding Davis, and established its publishing program with books by American writers of diverse racial and class backgrounds. Since then it has also been bringing works from around the world to North American readers. The Feminist Press is the longest surviving women's publishing house in the world.

== Founding and history ==
By the end of the 1960s, both Florence Howe and her then husband Paul Lauter had taught in the Freedom Schools in Mississippi, and Howe was already attempting to compile a women's studies curriculum for her writing students at Goucher College in Baltimore. As the 1970s approached, Howe was convinced that, just as she needed texts for teaching about women, so would other educators. Her initial appeal to a number of university and trade publishers to issue a series of critical feminist biographies proved of no avail. Ultimately, the Baltimore Women's Liberation, an active local group and publishers of a successful new journal, helped to raise money for the press's first publications. On November 17, 1970, the first meeting of the newly formed press was held in Florence Howe's living room. The first book to be published was Barbara Danish's children's book The Dragon and the Doctor in 1971. The new press was associated with the burgeoning women in print movement, an effort by second-wave feminists to establish autonomous communications networks of feminist periodicals, presses, and bookstores founded by and for women. Howe saw her dreams of producing feminist biographies come true with the publication of Elizabeth Barrett Browning at the end of 1971.

In the press's founding years, Tillie Olsen changed its course dramatically by giving Howe a photocopy of the 1861 pages of The Atlantic Monthly containing Rebecca Harding Davis's anonymously published novella Life in the Iron Mills. In 1972, the press issued this work by Rebecca Harding Davis as the first of its series of rediscovered feminist literary classics. Olsen's second suggestion, Daughter of Earth by Agnes Smedley, and Elaine Hedges’s suggestion, The Yellow Wallpaper by Charlotte Perkins Gilman, were published in 1973. Both have become staples of American literature and women's studies curriculums since, with the 1990 Norton Anthology of American Literature including both Life in the Iron Mills and The Yellow Wallpaper.

In the spring of 1971, Howe and her husband moved to New York, where she brought the burgeoning Press to her newly accepted professorship at the State University of New York (SUNY)/Old Westbury. The president of the school, who was interested in bringing women's studies programs to the college, allowed Howe to operate out of the corridor of one of the buildings. The press was met with excitement and support from students who worked in the small office in exchange for college work-study. Two New York City publishing professionals, Verne Moberg and Susan Lowes, contributed to the publication of three volumes of reprinted fiction released in 1972 and 1973, which Howe believed to exemplify the press's enduring commitment to producing course-adoptable books to supplement curriculums dominated by male writers.

In 1972, the Feminist Press became a 501(c)(3) organization with tax-exempt status and in 1975, the press moved into its own headquarters in a separate house on campus, a cottage which had been faculty apartments and a garage. The Feminist Press was committed to creating a democratic workplace where staff served on the board which made all publishing and policy decisions. In addition, all paid staff received equal salaries and served on committees including editorial, finance, and marketing & distribution.

The press continued its innovative program of publishing work in three categories: feminist biographies, reprints of important works by women writers, and nonsexist children's books. For each category, the press enlisted advisory committees of distinguished feminist writers, scholars, and educators. The Reprints Advisory Committee was established in 1973 with Founding members including Roslyn Baxandall, Mari Jo Buhle, Ellen DuBois, Florence Howe, Paul Lauter, Laurie Olsen, Lillian Robinson, Deborah S. Rosenfelt, Elaine Showalter, and Catharine Stimpson.

In 1973, the press received funding from the Rockefeller Foundation to survey secondary school textbooks in English and history and to plan for a project to develop supplementary texts. In 1975, the press received two major grants from the Ford Foundation and the Carnegie Corporation to begin what became a seven-year project – Women's Lives/Women's Work, a groundbreaking series of 12 books and teaching guides to supplement high school English and Social Studies texts. The series was co-published by the Feminist Press and McGraw-Hill's Webster Division. During the life of the project, the books and teaching guides were extensively tested and evaluated by teachers in schools all across the country.

Books in the Women's Lives/Women's Work series, alphabetically by author:

- Cantarow, Ellen with O’Malley, Susan Gushee; Strom, Sharon Hartman (1980). Moving the Mountain: Women Working for Social Change. Old Westbury, New York: The Feminist Press; New York: McGraw-Hill. ISBN 0070204438.
- Elsasser, Nan; MacKenzie, Kyle; Tixier y Vigil, Yvonne, eds. (1980) Las Mujeres: Conversations from a Hispanic Community Old Westbury, New York: The Feminist Press; New York: McGraw-Hill. ISBN 0912670843.
- Hedges, Elaine; Wendt, Ingrid, eds. (1980) In Her Own Image: Women Working in the Arts Old Westbury, New York: The Feminist Press; New York: McGraw-Hill. ISBN 0912670738.
- Hoffman, Nancy, ed. (1981) Woman’s “True” Profession: Voices from the History of Teaching. Old Westbury, New York: The Feminist Press; New York: McGraw-Hill. ISBN 0912670932.
- Hoffman, Nancy; Howe, Florence, eds. (1979) Women Working: An Anthology of Stories and Poems. Old Westbury, New York: The Feminist Press; New York: McGraw-Hill. ISBN 0070204314.
- Jensen, Joan M., ed. (1981) With These Hands: Women Working the Land. Old Westbury, New York: The Feminist Press; New York: McGraw-Hill. ISBN 0912670908.
- Kessler-Harris, Alice (1981) Women Have Always Worked: A Historical Overview. Old Westbury, New York: The Feminist Press; New York: McGraw-Hill. ISBN 091267086X.
- Nicholas, Susan Cary; Price, Alice M.; Rubin, Rachel (1979) Rights and Wrongs: Women’s Struggle for Legal Equality. Old Westbury, New York: The Feminist Press; New York: McGraw-Hill. ISBN 0070204241.
- Romer, Nancy (1981) The Sex-Role Cycle: Socialization from Infancy to Old Age. Old Westbury, New York: The Feminist Press; New York: McGraw-Hill. ISBN 091267069X.
- Sterling, Dorothy (1979) Black Foremothers: Three Lives. Old Westbury, New York: The Feminist Press; New York: McGraw-Hill. ISBN 0070204330.
- Swerdlow, Amy; Bridenthal, Renate; Kelly, Joan; Vine, Phylis (1981) Household and Kin: Families in Flux. Old Westbury, New York: The Feminist Press; New York: McGraw-Hill. ISBN 0912670681.
- Twin, Stephanie L., ed. (1979) Out of the Bleachers: Writings on Women and Sport. Old Westbury, New York: The Feminist Press; New York: McGraw-Hill. ISBN 0070204292.

The Feminist Press also played a pioneering role in the nascent field of women's studies by providing curricular materials, bibliographies, directories, and a newsletter. The Clearinghouse on Women's Studies, established at the press, was the primary source of information until the National Women's Studies Association was founded in 1977.

In the summer of 1985, the Feminist Press moved to the CUNY Graduate Center campus on East Ninety-Fourth Street in Manhattan, following an invitation from the school and was allowed to maintain an independent staff and board of directors.

In 2001, Jean Casella became the executive director of the press, followed by Gloria Jacobs, former Ms. Magazine editor, and writer Jennifer Baumgardner, cofounder of Soapbox, Inc, and later founder of Dottir Press. Jamia Wilson was the subsequent executive director of the Feminist Press, appointed in 2017, and was both the youngest director in the press's forty-nine-year history and the first woman of color to head the organization. “I grew up reading Feminist Press books from my mother’s shelf, and they were instrumental in developing my voice as an activist and writer. It’s an honor to join this intergenerational team to enliven the Press’s intersectional vision of publishing unapologetic, accessible texts that inspire action, teach empathy, and build community,” Wilson explained upon her appointment as ED. In 2022, Margot Atwell, formerly at Kickstarter, was appointed the newest executive director.

== Notable publishing endeavors ==
In 2016, the press started Amethyst Editions, a queer imprint curated by Michelle Tea that champions emerging queer and LGBT writers who employ genre-bending narratives and experimental writing styles, and complicates the conversation around American LGBTQ+ experiences beyond a coming out narrative. Tea's collection Against Memoir won the PEN/Diamonstein-Spielvogel Award for the Art of the Essay in 2019. Brontez Purnell, whose novel Since I Laid My Burden Down was also published by the Amethyst Editions imprint, received a Whiting Award for Fiction in 2018.

Love War Stories by Ivelisse Rodriguez was nominated for a PEN/Faulkner Award for Fiction in 2019.

The Feminist Press has also demonstrated a commitment to publishing diverse voices in translation. Among their recent bestselling translated titles are Asja Bakic's Mars, translated by Jennifer Zoble; Cristina Rivera Garza's The Iliac Crest, translated by Sarah Booker; and Armonía Somer's The Naked Woman, translated by Kit Maude. Pretty Things, a novel by Virginie Despentes that was translated from the French by Emma Ramadan, was longlisted for the 2019 Best Translated Book Award. Trifonia Melibea Obono's La Bastarda, translated by Lawrence Schimel and the first novel by a woman from Equatorial Guinea to be published in English, was shortlisted for the 2019 Lambda Literary Awards in the Lesbian Fiction category.

The Feminist Press also established the Louise Meriwether First Book Prize, a literary prize for debut women and nonbinary authors of color, in partnership with TAYO Literary Magazine. In 2017, YZ Chin became the first recipient of the Louise Meriwether First Book Prize for her short story collection Though I Get Home. The prize has since been awarded to Claudia D. Hernández in 2018 for Knitting the Fog and Melissa Valentine in 2019 for The Names of All the Flowers.

The Feminist Press won the 2020 Ivan Sandrof Lifetime Achievement Award at the National Book Critics Circle Awards.

== WSQ: Women's Studies Quarterly ==
The Feminist Press also publishes WSQ: Women's Studies Quarterly, an interdisciplinary peer-reviewed academic journal, based out of the City University of New York. The journal began as Women's Studies Newsletter in 1972, and in 1981 it was renamed Women's Studies Quarterly. Today it is a biannual release simply called WSQ. Covering a wide array of thematic subjects within emerging women's studies, the journal has published issues such as "Technologies," "Citizenship," and "Motherhood." The subject of each issue is considered through various lenses, including psychoanalytic, legal, queer, and historical interpretations in addition to many others.

== Notable authors and titles ==
- Danish, Barbara (1971). The Dragon and the Doctor. Old Westbury, New York: The Feminist Press. ISBN 0-912670-00-2.
- Harding Davis, Rebecca (1972). Life in the Iron Mills, and other stories. With a biographical interpretation by Tillie Olsen. Old Westbury, New York: The Feminist Press. ISBN 9780935312393.
- Oakley, Mary Ann B. (1972). Elizabeth Cady Stanton. Old Westbury, New York: The Feminist Press. ISBN 9780912670034.
- Ehrenreich, Barbara; English, Deirdre (1973). Witches, Midwives, & Nurses: a history of women healers (1st ed.). Old Westbury, New York: The Feminist Press. ISBN 9781558616615.
- Ehrenreich, Barbara; English, Deirdre (1973). Complaints and Disorders: the sexual politics of sickness. Old Westbury, New York: The Feminist Press. ISBN 9780904665017.
- Perkins Gilman, Charlotte (1973). The Yellow Wallpaper. Afterword by Elaine R. Hedges. New York, New York: The Feminist Press. ISBN 9781558611580.
- Smedley, Agnes (1973). Daughter of Earth. Old Westbury, New York: The Feminist Press. ISBN 9781936932788.
- Widerberg, Siv (1973). I'm Like Me: Poems for people who want to grow up equal. Translated by Verne Moberg. Old Westbury, New York: The Feminist Press. ISBN 9780912670089.
- Chopin, Kate (1974). The Storm and Other Stories. Edited and with an introduction by Per Seyersted. Old Westbury, New York: The Feminist Press. OCLC 3104145.
- Freeman, Mary Eleanor Wilkins (1974). The Revolt of Mother and Other Stories. Afterword by Michele Clark. Old Westbury, New York: The Feminist Press. ISBN 9781419180491.
- Klein, Norma (1974). A Train for Jane. Illustrated by Miriam Schottland. Old Westbury, New York: The Feminist Press. ISBN 9780912670348.
- Mason, Bobbie Ann (1975). The Girl Sleuth: a feminist guide. Old Westbury, New York: The Feminist Press. OCLC 1154562966.
- Chevigny, Belle Gale (1976). The Woman and the Myth: Margaret Fuller’s life and writings. Old Westbury, New York: The Feminist Press. ISBN 9780912670430.
- Kearns, Martha (1976). Käthe Kollwitz: woman and artist. Old Westbury, New York: The Feminist Press. ISBN 9780912670157.
- Maury, Inez (1976). My Mother the Mail Carrier/Mi Mamá la Cartera. Translated by Norah E. Alemany. Illustrated by Lady McCrady. Old Westbury, New York: The Feminist Press. ISBN 9780912670232.
- Smedley, Agnes (1976). Portraits of Chinese Women in Revolution. Old Westbury, New York: The Feminist Press. ISBN 9780912670447.
- Rosen, Ruth; Davidson, Sue eds. (1977). The Maimie Papers. Old Westbury, New York: The Feminist Press. Published with The Schlesinger Library, Radcliffe College, Cambridge, Massachusetts. ISBN 9781558611436.
- Phelps, Ethel Johnston (1978). Tatterhood and Other Tales: stories of magic and adventure. Illustrated by Pamela Baldwin Ford. Old Westbury, New York: The Feminist Press. OCLC 1036888564.
- Showalter, Elaine ed. (1978). These Modern Women: autobiographical essays from the twenties. Old Westbury, New York: The Feminist Press. ISBN 9781558610071.
- Wilson, Michael (1978). Salt of the Earth: A screenplay. Commentary by Deborah Silverton Rosenfelt. Old Westbury, New York: The Feminist Press. OCLC 1036858969.
- Hurston, Zora Neale (1979). I Love Myself When I Am Laughing . . . And Then Again When I Am Looking Mean and Impressive: a Zora Neale Hurston reader. Edited by Alice Walker. Old Westbury, New York: The Feminist Press. ISBN 9780912670669.
- Irwin, Hadley (1979). The Lilith Summer. Old Westbury, New York: The Feminist Press. ISBN 9780912670515.
- Marshall, Paule (1981). Brown Girl, Brownstones. Old Westbury, New York: The Feminist Press. ISBN 9781558614987.
- Paley, Grace (1991). Long Walks and Intimate Talks. New York: The Feminist Press. ISBN 9781558610446.
- Aidoo, Ama Ata (1993). Changes: a love story. New York: The Feminist Press. ISBN 9781558610651.
- Ines de la Cruz, Juana (1994). La respuesta [The Answer: including a selection of poems]. New York: The Feminist Press. ISBN 9781558610774.
- de Rosa, Tina (1996). Paper Fish. New York: The Feminist Press. ISBN 9781558611467.
- Reprinted: de Rosa, Tina (2003). Paper Fish. New York: The Feminist Press. ISBN 9781558614390.
- Klüger, Ruth (2001). Still Alive: a Holocaust girlhood remembered. New York: The Feminist Press. ISBN 9781558614369.
- Meriwether, Louise (2002). Daddy Was a Number Runner. New York: The Feminist Press. ISBN 9781558614420.
- Riverbend (2005). Baghdad Burning. New York: The Feminist Press. ISBN 9781558614895.
- Aldrich, Ann (2006). We Walk Alone. New York: The Feminist Press. ISBN 9781558615250.
- Despentes, Virginie (2010). King Kong Theory. New York: The Feminist Press. ISBN 9781558616578.
- Ehrenreich, Barbara; English, Deirdre (2010). Witches, Midwives, & Nurses: a history of women healers (2nd ed.). New York: The Feminist Press. ISBN 9781558616615.
- Bond, Justin Vivian (2011). Tango: my childhood, backwards and in high heels. New York: The Feminist Press. ISBN 9781558617476.
- Hurston, Zora Neale (2011). I Love Myself When I Am Laughing: A Zora Neale Hurston Reader. New York: The Feminist Press. ISBN 9780912670669.
- Parsipur, Shahrnush (2011). Women without men (2nd ed.). New York: The Feminist Press. ISBN 9781558617537.
- Pussy Riot (2013). Pussy Riot!: a punk prayer for freedom: letters from prison, songs, poems, and courtroom statements, plus tributes to the punk band that shook the world. New York: The Feminist Press. ISBN 9781558618343.
- Torrès, Tereska. Women's Barracks.
- Aimee, Rachel; Kaiser, Eliyanna; Ray, Audacia (2015). $pread : The Best of the Magazine that Illuminated the Sex Industry and Started a Media Revolution. Feminist Press at the City University of New York. ISBN 9781558618725.

== Series ==
The Feminist Press has launched multiple book series. Women Writing Africa was begun in 1994 with funding from the Ford and Rockefeller Foundations, and the four-volume series was completed in 2009. Like the two-volume Women Writing India, the series is composed of regionally unique women's literature. The Femmes Fatales series, featuring pulp, mystery, and noir novels by women writing in the 1930s, '40s, and '50s was launched in 2003.

- 2X2 Series
- Classic Feminist Writers
- Contemporary Classics by Women
- The Defiant Muse
- Femmes Fatales: Women Write Pulp
- The Helen Rose Scheuer Jewish Women's Series
- Jewish Women Writers
- Women Changing the World
- Women's Lives, Women's Work
- Women Writing Africa Project
- Women Writing in India
- Women Writing the Middle East
- Women Writing Science
- Ordinary Terrible Things
- Amethyst Editions
- Drag Queen Story Hour
- Feminist Folktales from Around the World

== See also ==
- List of feminist literature
- List of lesbian fiction
- LGBT Literature
- $pread
- Lambda Literary
