= The Dragon and the Doctor =

1971 picture book by Barbara Danish

- First edition cover
- Author: Barbara Danish
- Illustrator: Barbara Danish
- Language: English
- Genre: Children's picture book
- Publisher: The Feminist Press
- Publication date: 1971
- Publication place: United States
- Pages: 21 (1st ed.)
- ISBN: 0-912670-00-2
- OCLC: 21558041

The Dragon and the Doctor is a 1971 picture book written and illustrated by Barbara Danish. The story concerns a dragon with a sore tail who goes to see a doctor. The Dragon and the Doctor was the first book published by the Feminist Press. The publisher's founder, Florence Howe, had not initially planned to produce children's literature but a notification by a third party in a feminist newsletter that the press would be publishing children's books drew significant interest. Thus convinced, Howe enlisted Danish to adapt the Chinese picture book I Want to Be a Doctor into a new story with a female doctor protagonist.

The Dragon and the Doctor sold 5,000 copies in its first year of publication and was read on an LP anthology of non-sexist children's literature in 1975. It went out of print in 1979 and a revised second edition was released in 1995. The book has received mostly middling to negative reviews for its story and illustrations in the decades since its release. Nonetheless, it has been highlighted as an early work with LGBTQ representation as Danish included a character with two mothers in the revised second edition.

== Plot ==
A dragon with a sore tail seeks out a doctor. He meets a doctor and her brother Thomas, her nurse. The doctor and Thomas X-ray the dragon's tail to reveal several objects inside. The doctor discovers a zipper on his tail and removes the items, and feeling much better the dragon invites the doctor to a party. There, the dragon introduces the doctor to his friends. The dragon reveals that the zipper was accidentally added to his tail by his grandmother who thought it was the dress she was making and that his mother chose to keep it on him because "she thought it looked spiffy."

=== Second edition ===
There are several changes to the story in the second edition. The dragon is female instead of male, the doctor is called Dr. Judy instead of going unnamed, the nurse is now named Benjamin, and he and Dr. Judy are no longer siblings. The first half of the story is roughly the same as the full first edition, with Nurse Benjamin joining Dragon and Dr. Judy at the party.

The festivities are already in progress when they arrive and Dragon's friends meet the two guests. While everyone is dancing, someone discovers that paint has been spilled upon Dragon's friend Lucy. Upon closer examination, Dr. Judy realizes Lucy is not covered in spilled paint but instead chickenpox. Dragon carries Lucy and Dr. Judy to her home where her mothers feed them all cookies. Everyone says goodbye and leaves.

== Writing and publication ==
Florence Howe, an author and professor at Goucher College, grew interested in establishing an independent publishing house for feminist literature as second wave feminism grew increasingly visible in 1969. The idea for the Feminist Press coalesced in early 1970, although by September of that year Howe had abandoned the project. However, the Women's Liberation Newsletter in Baltimore published an announcement about the foundation of the Press, and when Howe returned to her Baltimore home from a trip, she found hundreds of letters expressing interest in the project. The Newsletter reported that the Press intended to publish biographies (as Howe had planned) and children's books (which Howe had never intended on publishing). She invited those who had written to express interest to her home on November 17, 1970, for a meeting which around 50 people attended.

Among those at the meeting was Leah Heyn, the writer responsible for including "children's books" in the Newsletter announcement. Heyn was present because her seven-year-old daughter sought a book featuring a female doctor, of which none were known to Howe or the rest of the guests present. The meeting concluded with a decision for the new Press to work on a picture book first. A Canadian friend of Howe's sent her a parcel of Chinese children's books which included one called I Want to Be a Doctor about a sister fixing her younger brother's rocking horse. Howe passed the book along to her former student Barbara Danish, a Goucher sophomore, who had been present at the November 17 meeting, saying that "the Chinese were generous, that they wouldn't mind our copying their book". Danish adapted the story in 20 minutes to be about a dragon instead of a rocking horse. She also provided its illustrations. Danish presented her drafts at the following meeting to an enthusiastic response.

Danish and Laura Brown, another Feminist Press founder, sought out a printer for the book and decided on Quickee Offset of Baltimore. The Dragon and the Doctor became the first publication of the Feminist Press. In its first printing, the book lacked an ISBN and a copyright symbol. The 21-page story was recommended for pre-kindergarten through second grade-aged readers. It sold 5,000 copies in its first year of publication. In 1975, the story was included on the non-sexist children's anthology LP Hurray for Captain Jane! And Other Liberated Stories for Children read by actor Tammy Grimes. The Dragon and the Doctor went out of print in 1979.

The book was republished in 1995 by the Feminist Press with its illustrations and text revised. Among other changes made, Danish gave Lucy two mothers in the scene where she is returned to her home.

== Reception and legacy ==
The work received middling to negative reviews. Liza Bingham, writing in 1971, described The Dragon and the Doctor as "not outstanding" but praised it as "a short, whimsical fantasy" with "some delightful kid-style drawings". Conversely, in The New York Review of Books, Margot Hentoff called the work "a spiritless, artificial nursery tale whose only reason for being is that the doctor in the game is played by a girl." Jane M. Bingham, reviewing the inclusion of The Dragon and the Doctor on Hurray for Captain Jane! called the story "a poor choice" for how it portrayed its female characters and for the quality of its writing. Bingham described the dragon's mother and grandmother as causing him undue suffering and criticized the doctor for failing to be paid for her work. According to the writer, "Danish tries too hard to create a wild story; the tale just doesn't amount to anything much except that it leaves the reader with a negative image of females".

Researcher Jamie Campbell Naidoo included the revised second edition of the story in his compendium of works with LGBTQ characters for youth readers but did not recommend it, writing that the book's "nonsensical narrative might appeal to some children but it is hard to follow at times and the cartoon illustrations add little to the story".
