= Women's Studies Quarterly =

- Discipline: Women's studies, Feminist Theory, Gender Studies, Queer Studies
- Language: English
- Edited by: Jillian Báez; Natalie Havlin

Publication details
- Former name: Women's Studies Newsletter
- History: 1972–present
- Publisher: The Feminist Press (USA)
- Frequency: Biannually

Standard abbreviations
- ISO 4: Women's Stud. Q.

Indexing
- ISSN: 0732-1562
- LCCN: 86643276
- JSTOR: 07321562
- OCLC no.: 7387895

Links
- Journal homepage; Online access; Online archive

Women's Studies Quarterly, often referred to as WSQ, is a biannual peer-reviewed academic journal of women's studies that was established in 1972 and published by The Feminist Press. The Feminist Press was founded by Florence Howe in 1970. Before changing its name to Women's Studies Quarterly in 1981, the publication was titled Women's Studies Newsletter. The name change indicated a shift in the publication's purpose and content.

Along with scholarly articles, the journal publishes fiction and creative nonfiction, poetry, and the visual arts. Currently, WSQ's bi-annual publications are based on themes. "Alerts and Provocations" informs readers about immediate political crises affecting women or regarding gender. "Classics Revisited" rereads a major text of women's and feminist studies, with a response by the original author. Book reviews and essays inform readers about recent work in the field. Other recent themes for WSQ issues have included precarious work (Fall/Winter 2017), mother (Fall Winter 2009), market (Fall/Winter 2010), and looking across the lens (Spring/Summer 2002). The Feminist Press, which is now housed at the (CUNY Graduate Center) in Midtown Manhattan, is still the sole publisher for each issue of WSQ issue.

The editors-in-chief are Jillian Báez (College of Staten Island, CUNY) and Natalie Havlin (LaGuardia Community College, CUNY). The poetry editor is Patricia Smith (College of Staten Island, CUNY). The fiction and prose editor is Rosalie Morales Kearns.

Previous editors-in-chief are Cynthia Chris (College of Staten Island), Matt Brim (College of Staten Island), Amy Herzog (Queens College), Joe Rollins (CUNY Graduate Center), Victoria Pitts-Taylor (Wesleyan University), and Talia Schaffer (Queens College), Cindi Katz (CUNY Graduate Center) and Nancy K. Miller (CUNY Graduate Center).

In 2007, WSQ obtained the 2007 Phoenix Award for Significant Editorial Achievement of The Council of Editors of Learned Journals.

== History ==
The journal was established in 1972 as the Women's Studies Newsletter, obtaining its current name in 1981. The first newsletter was published in 1972 and was published one time per season. On occasion there were less than four publications per year because editions condensed two seasons into one publication. As a newsletter, the topics were focused on women's studies curriculum in all grade levels, children's books, and receiving funding for women's studies programs and faculty. The newsletter created the core network that transformed into the National Women's Studies Association (NWSA) in 1977.

The first issue of Women's Studies Newsletter released in Fall 1972 begins the Front Matter with a section describing The Clearinghouse on Women's Studies. The Clearinghouse on Women's Studies began in 1969 in Florence Howe's office at Goucher College. The academic field of Women's Studies in the United States was in its early stages, and the Clearhousing on Women's Studies was a way to connect the growing community of women's studies scholars. In 1970, Howe asked the Modern Language Association's executive council to enable the Clearinghouse on Women's Studies to issue the first "Guide to Women's Studies Courses and Programs." Three "Guides," or lists of women's studies courses, were issued by the Clearinghouse between October 1971 and the summer of 1973. The Women's Studies Newsletter was a project of Clearinghouse, which was "an education project of the Feminist Press."

The Front Matter of the 1972 newsletter dates its origins to an east coast women's studies conference in Pittsburgh where a group decided to organize a women's studies newsletter. The newsletter was aimed to "be a forum throughout the country for the women's studies movement." Individuals reading and engaging with the newsletter were interested in how to get funding for women's studies programs and how to create jobs for people to teach these types of classes. Topics included news updates from Clearinghouse and other ongoing initiatives, academic reviews and articles, case studies from certain schools or universities, reading lists, and other topics pertinent to the expanding discipline of women's studies throughout the late 1970s and early 1980s.

As the third issue went to press, the newsletter has upwards of 500 subscribers. Subscription costs ranged between one and two dollars per issue. However, once the newsletter entered its fifth year of publication (1976), the subscription list had stagnated at just under 2,000, which did not equate to the compiled list of women's studies teachers in higher education that had grown to over 5,500. This disparity caused the newsletter to increase subscription costs moving forward. In the Fall 1976 issue, there was a proposal for a founding convention of National Women's Studies Association placed next to the edition's editorial. NWSA became a co-publisher of the Women's Studies Newsletter throughout 1982, at which point it returned to solely being produced by the Feminist Press.
