= Jamia Wilson =

American writer and feminist activist (born 1980)

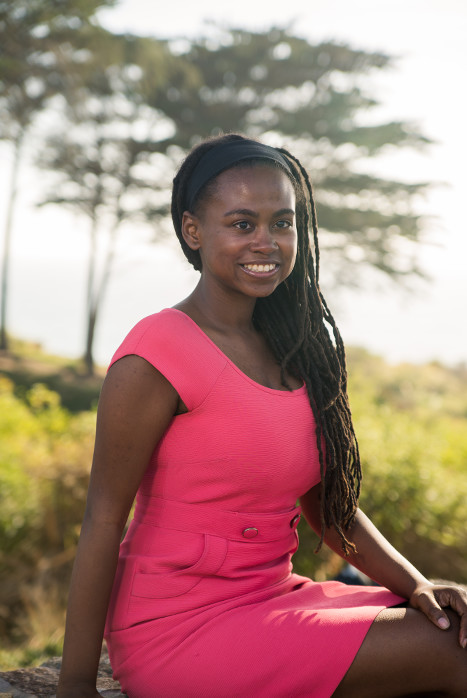
- Born: October 10, 1980 (age 46); Orangeburg, South Carolina, US
- Education: American University (B.A.); New York University (M.A.)
- Occupations: Vice President & Executive Editor at Random House
- Notable work: Young, Gifted and Black; Step into Your Power
- Movement: Feminism
- Spouse: Travis Sullivan
- Website: jamiawilson.org

Jamia Wilson (born October 10, 1980) is an American writer, commentator, and feminist activist based in New York City. She is currently Vice President and Executive Editor at Random House and was formerly the Director and Publisher of the Feminist Press at CUNY. Wilson was the youngest director in the Press's history, as well as the first woman of color to head the organization. Prior to joining the Feminist Press, Wilson was the Executive Director of Women, Action, and the Media, and a staff writer at Rookie magazine.

Wilson has written or been a contributor to several books, including notable titles for young readers such as Young, Gifted and Black and Step into Your Power.

Since 2023, Wilson has been involved with Feminists in the City as a mentor.

== Background ==
Jamia Wilson was born Orangeburg, South Carolina, in the Southern United States, and grew up as an expat in Saudi Arabia. In 2002, she graduated from American University with a B.A. degree in communications, and has received her M.A. in Humanities and Social Thought at New York University.

In 2015, Wilson was executive director of non-profit organization Women, Action, and the Media (WAM), dedicated to "building a robust, effective, inclusive movement for gender justice in media." In 2017, she joined the Feminist Press at CUNY, becoming the youngest director in the Press's history, and the first woman of color to head the organization. She was a member of the third cohort of the Move to End Violence social change movement. She was an Executive Director of Youth Tech Health, and was a TED Prize Storyteller, and former President of Programs at the Women's Media Center.

In 2013, Wilson was named among the "17 Faces of the Future of Feminism" by Refinery29.

Among publications and outlets for which Wilson has written are Ms. magazine, The New York Times, Elle, Refinery29, The Washington Post, Teen Vogue, The Guardian, The New York Times, Glamour, and Rookie.

She is married to jazz saxophonist and Travis Sullivan's Bjorkestra band leader Travis Sullivan.

== Works ==
=== Books ===
- Roadmap for Revolutionaries: Resistance, Activism & Advocacy for All, Penguin Random House, 2018
- Young, Gifted and Black, 2018
- Together We Rise: The Women's March Behind The Scenes At The Protest Heard Around The World, Dey Street Books, 2018, ISBN 9780062843432
- Step Into Your Power. 2019
- This Book Is Feminist, 2024
- Make Good Trouble: Discover Movements That Sparked Change, 2025

=== Contributions to academic publications ===
- Signs Journal
