= Iraq the model =

Blog, 2003–2011

Iraq the Model is a currently-dormant weblog whose last post was made on October 5, 2011. It was set up in November 2003 by brothers Omar and Mohammed Fadhil which details accounts of the Iraq War from Baghdad. The blog was often cited by conservative commentators as a source for the good news in Iraq that the American media is not reporting, in contrast to other Iraqi-written blogs such as Baghdad Burning, which show far less pleasant or optimistic scenes from post-invasion Iraq.

According to a New York Times article, people posting comments on Martini Republic accused Iraq the Model of being run covertly by the Central Intelligence Agency. The author of the New York Times article investigated these claims, but found no evidence that the blog was being run by anyone other than the Fadhil brothers. Ali Fadhil also previously blogged there.

The blog rose into prominence when US President George W. Bush cited the blog in a speech defending the Iraq War.
