= La Bastarda =

2016 Spanish-language novel by Trifonia Melibea Obono

- First edition
- Author: Trifonia Melibea Obono
- Language: Spanish
- Genre: Lesbian literature
- Published: 2016
- Publisher: Flores Raras
- Publication place: Spain
- ISBN: 9788494601804

La Bastarda (English: 'The Bastard') is a 2016 Spanish-language novel by Trifonia Melibea Obono. The book is banned in Equatorial Guinea. The book tells the story of Okomo, an orphan who was born a bastard whose mother died during childbirth, and lives in a traditional village in Equatorial Guinea that is about a day's walk from Gabon. She is forced to confront her culture's attitudes about gender roles, requirements for women to have sex for the purpose of reproduction at the direction of men, and sexuality. After being outed, she eventually retreats to the sanctuary of the freedom of the forest.

Trifonia Melibea Obono is considered one of the most avant-garde and brave Black African voices in former colonial Spanish Africa. The book is her second major novel published in Spanish.

== Background ==
La Bastarda was written by Trifonia Melibea Obono, a Spanish-speaking black woman from Equatorial Guinea. It is her second major novel in Spanish, and third overall. Obono has been described by ABC and Casa Africa as one of the most avant-garde and brave Black African voices in former colonial Spanish Africa. Obono is considered Spanish when at home in Equatorial Guinea, while being considered a negra while living in Spain. People in her society sometimes consider her crazy for how she dissects and dismantles societal norms. Her previous published works in Spanish included Herencia de bindendee.

The author graduated from Universidad de Murcia with a bachelor's degree in political science. She later earned a Masters in International Cooperation, and Development from the same university. She then became a professor at the Universidad Nacional de Guinea Ecuatoria in the Faculty of Arts and Sciences. She also is a faculty member at Spain's Universidad Nacional de Educación a Distancia (UNED), as part of its Center for Afro-Hispanic Studies. In 2017, she completed her doctorate at the Universidad de Salamanca, writing her thesis about traditional marriage and dowry practices among the Fang people of her home country.

In an interview with ABC, she has said the book is not autobiographical. The surroundings in which the main character, Okomo, is placed are similar to those which the author grew up in.

== Plot summary ==
Okomo, an orphan who was born a bastard and whose mother died during childbirth, lives in Ayá Esang, a traditional village in Equatorial Guinea that is about a day's walk from Gabon. As a sixteen-year-old who had her period, she is watched over by her grandfather's first wife, her grandfather and a community who has already rejected her because of her birth. Given her place in this polygamous family and not knowing who she is, Okomo seeks to know more about her father. Her family tries to prevent her from doing so and has forbidden her from trying to find and contact him.

Okomo has a special relationship with an uncle, her mother's brother and another child of her grandfather's first wife, named Marcelo. Because her uncle is a woman man, the family is estranged from him and Okomo becomes a key contact person in their attempts to get Marcelo to have sex with his sister-in-law. This is important as the grandfather's first born son is barren, and Marcelo is a familial relation who can ensure the family line continues. He declines, and Marcelo's house is burned, but not before he managed to escape to the forest.

Attempts to control Okomo by prohibiting her from contacting Marcelo and other social undesirables lead to Okomo to walk with a group of three girls who have also largely rejected the expectations of them from Fang society. In the middle of one walk, Okomo engages in sex in the forest with the three girls. She soon forms a bond with one girl, Dina, to the exclusion of the other two and against the rules of the group that sex should only be communal among them. This later leads to the other girls to feeling jealous and excluded, outing Okomo and Dina during the saint's day feast of Okomo's grandfather. After everyone pretended to ignore this, the two girls beat Okomo when she went to get water. The full story came out, and two girls were married off. One girl was isolated to live with her father who got her pregnant and abused her. Okomo's grandmother basically sends her away to Okomo's mother's sister to get money to fund a cure for her barrenness as a result of syphilis. All four girls eventually flee to the forest, joining Marcelo and his partner, while creating a family amongst themselves.

== Characters ==
- Okomo: The book's narrator, Okomo is a teenage girl who was born to an unmarried mother and a "scoundrel" father whose identity remains unknown to her. Frequently labelled as a "bastard" in the village, Okomo is raised by her maternal grandparents.
- Marcelo: Okomo's uncle, who is shunned by the family and lives in the forest due to being a "man-woman" and refusing to do his duty of impregnating his sister-in-law due to his brother's sterility.
- Adà: Okomo's grandmother, who is barren as a result of getting syphilis from her husband Osá, and who is upset at his subsequent decision to marry a second wife in order to continue having sons. She is determined to marry Okomo off so she does not follow in her mother's footsteps.
- Dina: A member of the "Indecency Club" whom Okomo falls in love with, whose mother and sister have died.
- Osá: Okomo's grandfather and the patriarch of the family, who is determined to carry on his family line through having sons and grandsons.
- Pilar: A member of the "Indecency Club" who is rumoured to be incestuously abused by her father.
- Linda: A member of the "Indecency Club" whose father is heavily in debt.
- Restituta: Marcelo's friend, an amputee who works as a prostitute in the village.
- Jesusín: Marcelo's long-term secret lover, who lives with him in the woods.
- Osá's second wife: A young woman who is 28 years younger than Adà, with whom she often gets into physical and verbal fights.
- Marcelino: Okomo's uncle, who is sterile and unable to carry on the family line.
- Marcelino's wife: Okomo's aunt-in-law, who is desperate for Marcelo to impregnate her so she can have children of her own.

== Main themes ==
One of the main themes is about the comparisons between heterosexuality and homosexuality in rural Equatorial Guinea. At the same time, it shows the invisibility of lesbians in Fang society. It is also about the importance of gender roles in this society, and how they intersect with sexuality. The book is also about being liberated from these restrictive ideas around sexuality and gender roles.

The importance of gender roles is shown among other ways when the main character cuts the toenails of her grandfather. It demonstrates how in Fang society the older man is always in charge, and how is often does not listen to those below him in the social hierarchy and who is never there when you need him. The leading male figures in people's lives may know nothing because people are too scared to tell him things.

Invisibility of lesbians in the book is discussed through the terms used for gay men and lesbian women. Gay men are referred to as "fam e mina" in Spanish and "bequebe fafam" in Fang, meaning man woman or man who behaves like his sister. While the Fang language has a word to describe gay men, the language has no word to describe lesbians.

The book shows throughout that the value of men is in owning a home and in siring children. Women's value is derived through giving birth and having children. Gay men challenge this system because they are not engaged in reproductive activities. Women's importance in sexual relations is minimal, with no real thought given to their consent or pleasure in the act. In the book, being a woman is about fulfilling expectations of others to procreate at an early age. This is an expectation set by her grandmother that is put on the orphaned Okomo after she gets her first period. The irrelevance of women as things other than tools for procreation is shown through the sale of two girls to pay off debts by their fathers.

Liberation from the cultural and societal restrictions around sexuality and gender roles in the book are expressed through Marcelo retreating to the forest where he can be with his partner. The four lesbian girls later follow him in stages to gain their own liberation.

== Literary significance and critical reaction ==
La Bastarda is the first story about lesbians from Equatorial Guinea to be published in Spanish. In 2016, the book was included on a list by El País as one of the ten best books by an African writer.

Alejandro de los Santos, writing for afribuku.com, liked the book, but felt the last chapter was a bit rushed. The pacing was not consistent with the rest of the chapters.

== Publication history ==
The book was first published in Spanish in 2016 by Flores Raras. It is 116 pages long. A second edition was published in 2017. An English-language version was published in 2018 by The Feminist Press. It was translated by Lawrence Schimel, with an afterword by Abosede George.

La Bastarda is being sold in Equatorial Guinea, though it can be hard to find. The book is officially banned in the country. It is difficult for local authors to publish in any language, let alone Spanish, in the country.
