= YZ Chin =

YZ Chin is a Malaysian-born writer living in the United States.

== Early life and education ==
Chin is a former software engineer. She graduated from the McCormick School of Engineering at Northwestern University in 2007, where she also studied creative writing.

== Career ==
Chin's first book was a volume of stories titled Though I Get Home released in 2018. It received the Feminist Press and TAYO Literary Magazine Louise Meriwether First Book Prize.

Her first novel was Edge Case published in 2021. In the Washington Post, Jung Yun wrote that the novel's depiction of foreign workers in the New York City tech industry "shines brightest [in] its depiction of characters who live in a liminal space." In The New York Times, Lauren Oyler wrote that the book is "not only a subtly provocative depiction of the tech industry, and this country, as tilting ever more off-kilter; but also a realistic portrayal of a woman in crisis." The New York Times named it an "Editors' Choice."

Chin was a 2023 MacDowell Fellow in Literature.
