= Riverbend (blogger) =

Iraqi blogger

- Born: 1978 or 1979 (age 46–47)
- Occupation: Computer programmer
- Years active: 2003–2007
- Website: Baghdad Burning

Riverbend is the pseudonymous author of the blog "Baghdad Burning", launched on August 17, 2003. Riverbend's existence and identity remain a mystery, but the weblog entries suggest that she is a young Iraqi woman from a mixed Shia and Sunni family, living with her parents and brother in Baghdad. Before the United States occupation of Iraq she was a computer programmer.

She writes in an idiomatic English with, as James Ridgeway notes in the introduction to the Feminist Press edition of her work, "a slight American inflection". This has led to some controversy over her identity, as some claim she is an American who used a pseudonym to express their thoughts on U.S. involvement in Iraq. These concerns increased when a blogger did try to imitate the young blogger by creating a blog and using the name riverSbend to confuse those who followed the original blog. Riverbend talked about this blogger and corrected the narrative in her blog post on Wednesday, October 29, 2003.

Riverbend's blog combines political statements with a large dose of Iraqi cultural information, such as the celebration of Ramadhan and examples of Iraqi cuisine. In March 2006, her website received the Bloggie award for Best Middle East and Africa blog.

On April 26, 2007, Riverbend announced that she and her family would be leaving Iraq, owing to the lack of security in Baghdad and the ongoing violence there. On September 6, 2007, she reported that she had arrived safely in Syria.

Her last "regular" entry was on October 22, 2007, after a gruelling exit from and return to Syria to have her passport stamped as a "temporary visitor".

On April 9, 2013, she updated her blog with a post "Ten Years On", in which she said she had moved on from Syria "before the heavy fighting, before it got ugly" and considered herself fortunate. She was a year in another country and moved again to a third Arab country "with the hope that, this time, it'll stick until... Until when? Even the pessimists aren't sure anymore. When will things improve? When will be able to live normally? How long will it take?" She shared reflections on what Iraqis had learned in the ten years since the Fall of Baghdad. There have been no further entries at her blog.

== Publishing ==
Riverbend's weblog entries were first collected and published as Baghdad Burning, ISBN 978-1-55861-489-5 (with a foreword by the investigative journalist James Ridgeway), and Baghdad Burning II, ISBN 978-1-55861-529-8, (also with an introduction by James Ridgeway and Jean Casella). They have since been translated and published in numerous countries and languages. In 2005, Baghdad Burning won third place for the Lettre Ulysses Award for the Art of Reportage and in 2006 it was longlisted for the Samuel Johnson Prize.

Baghdad Burning has also been made into several dramatic plays, mostly produced in New York City. BBC Radio 4 broadcast a five-episode dramatization of her blog, "Baghdad Burning", on the Woman's Hour serial, on each day from 18 to 22 December 2006.

== See also ==
- Iraq the model
