= Sharon M. Harris =

American literary scholar

Sharon M. Harris is a feminist literary scholar and cultural historian, and she was the founder and first president of the Society for the Study of American Women Writers. From 1996 to 2004, she edited the society's journal, Legacy, widely considered the premier journal in the field. Harris was also one of the three founders of the Society of Early Americanists. An elected member of the American Antiquarian Society, Harris is the author and editor of numerous books, including Executing Race: Early American Women's Narratives of Race, Society, and the Law (2005) and Dr. Mary Walker, An American Radical (2009). As a key figure in the so-called "recovery" period of the 1980s and 1990s, Harris was initially known for her study of Rebecca Harding Davis, published in 1991. Harris is currently professor emerita at the University of Connecticut.

== Biography ==
Harris received her Ph.D. from the University of Washington in 1988, after which she became an assistant professor at Temple University. By 1992, she had moved to the University of Nebraska–Lincoln, where she rose to the rank of professor. Harris briefly held the Lorraine Sherley Professorship in Literature at Texas Christian University before joining the English Department at the University of Connecticut, where she directed the Humanities Institute.

== Scholarship "Across the Gulf" ==
In her 2009 state-of-the-field essay, "'Across the gulf': working in the 'post-recovery' era," Harris suggested that feminist literary and cultural studies have not moved from a "recovery" to a "post-recovery" phase, but rather that feminist recovery work is unfolding in a "multi-phased" way. Calling for a scholarship that bridges connections "across the gulf"—a phrase drawn from Rebecca Harding Davis's 1881 article of the same title—Harris suggests that feminist scholars continue to recover texts written by women, but that this recovery work be theorized in relation to various critical contexts, from labor to religious faith to regionalism to race. Harris writes: "The recovery of women's writings has always been and must continue to be about advancing knowledge once a text has been recovered. Nor can our recovery work simply be of texts: Once a text is "recovered," it must be analyzed through an equally broad compendium of theoretical perspectives, cultural contexts, transatlantic contexts, interdisciplinary contexts, and print and production contexts. That is, the scope of contexts in which we place texts is really what recovery is about, and in that sense our work has and always will have only begun." Taking the US Civil War-era as an example, Harris discusses how scholars must theorize the work of women writers during this period in relation to the economic, religious, racial, and other dimensions of the period.

== Major works ==
=== Monographs ===
Rebecca Harding Davis: A Life Among Writers (West Virginia University Press, 2018)

Dr. Mary Walker: An American Radical (Rutgers University Press, 2009)

Executing Race: Early American Women’s Narratives of Race, Society, and the Law (Ohio State University Press, 2005)

Rebecca Harding Davis and American Realism (University of Pennsylvania Press, 1991)

=== Edited works ===
A Feminist Reader: Feminist Thought from Sappho to Satrapi (Cambridge University Press, 2013) [with Linda K. Hughes]

Rebecca Harding Davis’s Stories of the Civil War Era (University of Georgia Press, 2009) [with Robin Cadwallader]

Letters and Cultural Transformations in the United States, 1760–1860 (Ashgate Publishing, 2009) [with Theresa Strouth Gaul]

Mercy Otis Warren: Selected Letters (University of Georgia Press, 2009)

The Awakening, by Kate Chopin (Bedford-St. Martin's, 2007)

Periodical Literature in Eighteenth-Century America (University of Tennessee Press, 2004)

Blue Pencils and Hidden Hands: Women Editing Periodicals, 1830–1910 (Northeastern University Press, 2004)

Women’s Early American Historical Narratives (Penguin, 2003)

Rebecca Harding Davis: Writing Cultural Autobiography (Vanderbilt University Press, 2001) [with Janice M. Lasseter]

American Women Prose Writers, 1870–1920. Dictionary of Literary Biography Vol. 221 (Gale, 2000)

American Women Writers to 1800: An Oxford Anthology (Oxford University Press, 1996)

Selected Writings of Judith Sargent Murray. Women Writers in English to 1830 Series (Oxford University Press, 1995)

Redefining the Political Novel: American Women Writers 1797–1901. (University of Tennessee Press, 1995)
