= Trifonia Melibea Obono =

Equatoguinean writer (born 1982)

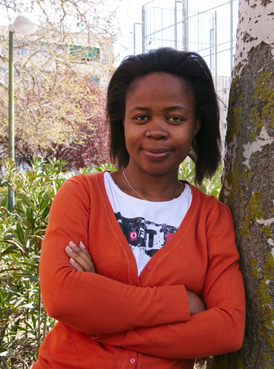
- Obono in 2016
- Born: Trifonia Melibea Obono Ntutumu Obono; 27 November 1982 (age 43); Afaetom, Evinayong, Equatorial Guinea
- Occupations: Writer, academic and activist

Trifonia Melibea Obono Ntutumu Obono (born 27 November 1982) is an Equatorial Guinean novelist, political scientist, academic, and LGBT activist. Her novel La Bastarda is the first novel by a female Equatorial Guinean writer to be translated into English.

== Academic career ==
Obono has a degree in Political Science & Journalism awarded by the University of Murcia in Spain and later studied there for an MA in International Development. She is a professor in the Department of Social Sciences at the UNGE (National University of Equatorial Guinea) in Malabo, as well as teaching since 2013 in the Afro-Hispanic Studies Center of the UNED. She is currently studying for an PhD at the University of Salamanca looking at gender and equality. Obono has written on how women's lives in Spanish-speaking Africa have been visualised through postcolonial and African perspectives.

== Literary career ==
Obono has published six novels in Spanish: La Bastarda (2016), Yo no quería ser madre (2016), La albina del dinero (2017), Las mujeres hablan mucho y mal (2019), and La hija de las mitangan (2023). She also published a book of essays titled Allí abajo de las mujeres in 2019.

All works deal with the themes of women's rights, gender and sexuality. Obono has been described as one of the bravest writers due to her confrontation of these issues. Her work is also concerned with legacies of Spanish colonisation in Africa and she is an expert on the history of "Spanish Guinea". Her work makes an important contribution to black African, Spanish-speaking, Atlantic cultures.

La Bastarda is the first novel by a woman from Equatorial Guinea to be translated into English. Due to its lesbian protagonist, the book is currently banned in Equatorial Guinea. Translated by Lawrence Schimel, an extract is included in the 2019 anthology New Daughters of Africa (edited by Margaret Busby).

=== LGBTQ+ activism ===
Obono is outspoken about LGBTQ+ human rights issues in Equatorial Guinea. She uses her literary work as activism, by writing LGBTIQ+ characters, she provides representation for others are not heterosexual. She has written about the taboos that mean that homosexuality is not discussed in her country and uses her global platforms to call these out as false. Obono herself is bisexual.

=== Awards ===
- 2019 - Global Literature in Libraries Initiative Award
- 2019 - Ideal Woman Award (Equatorial Guinea)
- 2018 - International Prize for African Literature
