= Life in the Iron Mills =

1861 short story by Rebecca Harding Davis

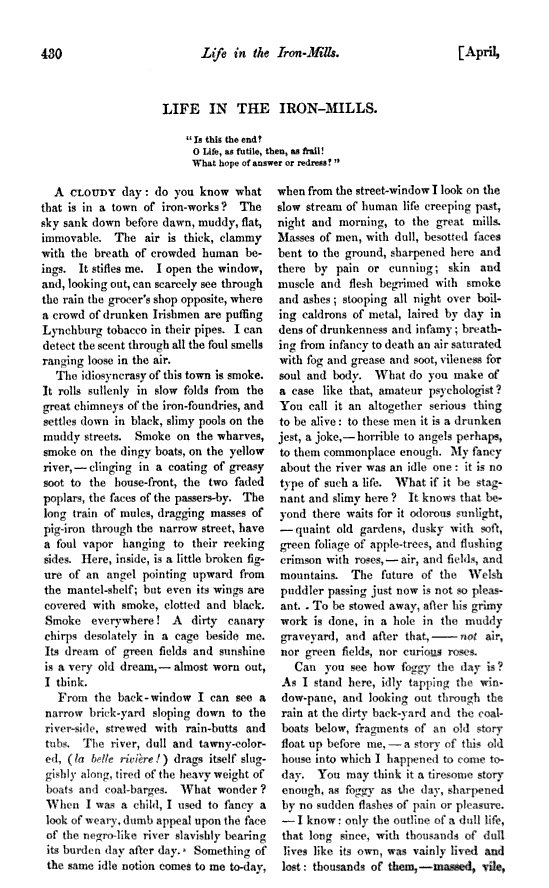
- Language: English
- Genre: Realism
- Publisher: The Atlantic Monthly
- Publication place: United States
- Media type: Print (periodical)
- ISBN: 9780935312393

Life in the Iron Mills is a short story written by Rebecca Harding Davis in 1861, set in the factory world of the nineteenth century. It is one of the earliest American realist works, and is an important text for those who study labor and women's issues. It was immediately recognized as an innovative work, and introduced American readers to "the bleak lives of industrial workers in the mills and factories of the nation."

Life in the Iron Mills was initially published in The Atlantic Monthly in April 1861. After being published anonymously, both Emily Dickinson and Nathaniel Hawthorne praised the work. Elizabeth Stuart Phelps Ward was also greatly influenced by Davis's Life in the Iron Mills and in 1868 published in The Atlantic Monthly "The Tenth of January", based on the 1860 fire at the Pemberton Mills in Lawrence, Massachusetts.

Rebecca Harding Davis was considered one of the nation's first social historians and pioneering literary artists. She wrote to find social change for Black people, women, immigrants, and the working class throughout the Civil War. Throughout her long career, Davis challenged traditional subjects and older styles of writing. During her early childhood, her family lived in Florence, Alabama, before moving in 1837 to Wheeling, Virginia (now West Virginia), on the Ohio River. Its iron mills and immigrant populations inspired the setting of Life in the Iron Mills.

== Background ==
"It always has seemed to me that each human being, before going out into the silence, should leave behind him, not the story of his own life, but of the time in which he lived, - as he saw it, - its creed, its purpose, its queer habits, and the work which it did or left undone in the world."

— Rebecca Harding Davis

Rebecca Harding Davis wrote Life in the Iron Mills and other short stories to represent the events going on around her during the era of the American Civil War. The short story was published by The Atlantic Monthly. Davis was paid well for her story and continued to publish short stories for The Atlantic Monthly. Life in the Iron Mills received much attention during her lifetime; she was also recognized by several literary figures including as Oliver Wendell Holmes Sr., Amos Bronson Alcott, Elizabeth Palmer Peabody, Henry Ward Beecher, Ralph Waldo Emerson, and Nathaniel Hawthorne. Hawthorne encouraged Davis to continue to write, but she was forgotten by the literary world by the time of her death.

Davis attended college at the Washington Female Seminary and studied the Bible intensively. It is here Davis would encounter influential scholars and political thinkers, and explore ideas and produce thoughts of her own regarding such social and religious issues. According to some scholars, Davis' work was heavily influenced by the "ethical teachings of Christianity." This is evident in Life in the Iron Mills, where Davis explores the greediness that derives from the Industrial Revolution.

According to Gregory Hadley, Davis's writings were partly shaped by the renewed interest of Christianity called the Second Great Awakening, which emphasizes on Personal Faith that was defined on repentance, believed Christ as the Savior, and live according to the Bible and Social Action. Social reform had heavily influenced the women who were on this "moral crusade." Protestant denominations had a remarkable growth spurt, and by the 1850s millions of Americans had converted to Christianity. Though many reviews failed to recognize Davis' Christian faith was an important factor in her writings. Davis' writings had focused on problems that Christians of her time were concerned with; slavery, work exploitation, equal education, and justice for women.

The story takes place in the 1830s, a time when the Industrial Revolution was well underway. Until the 1840s well-to-do entrepreneurs established new mills and factories through their own finances because banks usually did not invest in industry or make loans to manufacturers. Industry thrived until the panic of 1837, originating in Britain, which affected investments in the United States, resulting in the bankruptcies of both British and American manufacturers and extensive unemployment. The American economy fell into a depression from which it did not emerge until 1843. By the 1850s, iron manufacturing was doing especially well, and by 1860 it was the nation's leading industry. Cotton production was another major industry. Investors profited significantly at the expense of workers.

Industry depended greatly on immigrant laborers. Approximately four million Irish, German, and British immigrants moved to the United States between 1820 and 1860. Most of them were unskilled peasants, laborers, and farmers who found employment in factories, on construction sites, at warehouses and docks, and in private homes. The living conditions depicted in Life in the Iron Mills for many immigrants were poor, indeed not much better than what they had experienced in Europe. Lacking enough money to buy food, many suffered from malnutrition and from diseases like cholera, smallpox, and tuberculosis ("consumption"), with which the main character, Hugh Wolfe, is afflicted.

In the era of the feminist movement, the short story resurfaced through the help of the feminist writer Tillie Olsen. As an adviser for the Feminist Press in the 1970s, she came across Life in the Iron Mills and suggested it for republication. Olsen helped the short story gain critical reception once again as Davis intended in the 19th century.

== Plot summary ==
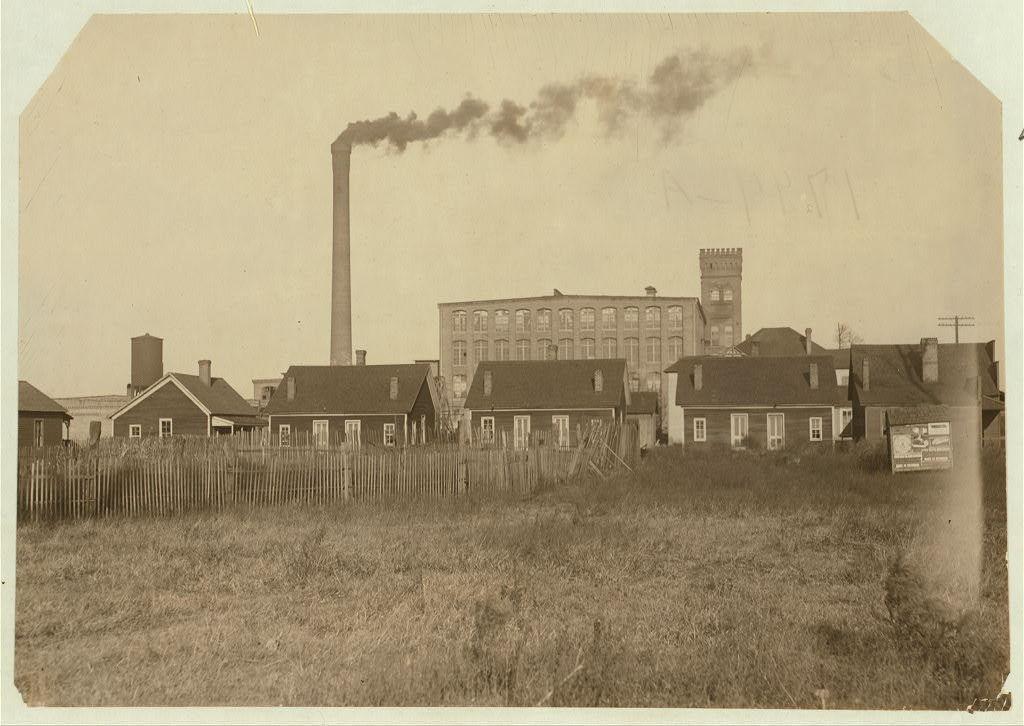
Housing in a mills factory in Alabama as photographed by Hine, Lewis Wickes in 1910.

Life in the Iron Mills begins with an omniscient narrator who looks out a window and sees smog and ironworkers. The gender of the narrator is never known, but it is evident that the narrator is a middle-class observer. As the narrator looks out the windowpane, an old story comes to mind; a story of the house that the narrator is living in. The narrator cautions the reader to have an objective mind and not be quick to judge the character in the story they are about to tell the reader. The narrator begins to introduce Deborah, Hugh Wolfe's cousin. She is described as a meek woman who works hard and has a hump on her back. Deborah finds out from Janey, that Hugh did not take lunch to work, and she decides to walk many miles in the rain to take a lunch for Wolfe. As she walks up to the mills, Deborah begins to describe it as if it were hell, but she keeps going for Wolfe. When she arrives Wolfe is talking among friends and he recognizes her. The narrator explains his affection for her but also describes his affection as loveless and sympathetic. Hugh finds no time to eat his dinner and goes back to do a day of labor in the mills. Deborah, who is exhausted, stays with Hugh and rests until his shift is over. In the meantime, the narrator further explains that Wolfe does not belong in the environment of the iron mill workers. He is known as "Molly Wolfe" by other workers because of his manner and background in education.

When Wolfe is working he spots men that do not look like workers. He sees Clarke, the son of Kirby, Doctor May who is a physician, and two other men that he does not recognize. These men stop by to look at the working men, and as they are talking and observing, they spot a weird object that has the shape of a human. As they get closer, they see that it is an odd-shaped statue built with korl. They begin to analyze it and wonder who created such a statue, one of the workers points at Wolfe and the men go to him. They ask him why he built such a statue and what it represents. All Hugh says is that "She be hungry". The men begin to talk about the injustice of the labor force, and one goes as far as to say that Hugh can get out of the meager job he is in, but that he unfortunately cannot help. The men leave, but not before Deborah steals one of their wallets, which has a check for a substantial amount inside. They go back home and Wolfe feels like he is a failure and feels anger towards his economic situation.

Once home, Deborah confesses to stealing from Mitchell and shamefully gives the money to Wolfe to do with it what he pleases. Wolfe decides to keep the money believing he is deserving of it because after all they are all deserving in God's eyes. The narrator transitions to a different scene with Dr. May reading the newspaper and seeing that Wolfe was put in jail for stealing from Mitchell. The story goes back to Hugh and he is in prison with Deborah. The narrator explains how terrible their situation is, and goes on to give detail of Wolfe's mental disintegration. Hugh ends up losing his mind and killing himself in prison. The story ends with a Quaker woman who comes to bless and help with the body of Hugh. She talks to Deborah and promises her that she will give Hugh a proper burial, and come back for her when she is released from jail.

== Characters ==
- Hugh Wolfe is a Welsh puddler who, born into poverty, is a laborer who turns pig iron into wrought iron by puddling. Despite the demanding hours at the mill, Hugh has a special talent; artistic talent to sculpt out of korl, "a light, porous substance, of a delicate, waxen, flesh-colored tinge", a leftover refuse from the smelting process. Many of the workers make fun of Hugh for his interest in sculpting and his relationship with Deborah. Hugh yearns for beauty and purity. He has a good heart and cares for Deborah, even though she influences him into taking the stolen money.
- Deborah Wolfe, is Hugh's cousin, a hunch back who loves Hugh, and often takes dinner to Hugh, even if it means her missing dinner. She works at the spools and inadvertently plays a key role in Hugh's downward spiral in the narrative.
- Janey, is a child who sleeps over at Hugh and Deb's occasionally when her father is drunk. She is clearly beautiful, which makes Deb jealous.
- Mr. Clarke, an overseer at the iron mill where Hugh works.
- Young Kirby, son of the mill's co-owner. He feels no obligation toward the workers except "a narrow limit,--the pay-hour on Saturday night."
- Doctor May. He is one of the town's physicians. He feels compassion toward the workers, but the overwhelming task of improving the thousands of workers (1200 at this mill alone) prevents him from helping Hugh, even when Hugh asks for it explicitly. Instead, he gives Hugh some empty words of encouragement.
- Mitchell. Kirby's brother-in-law (and son-in-law of the mill owner), a man broadly educated in the classical sense who was "spending a couple of months in the boarders of a Slave State, to study the institutions of the South" (Davis, 17).
- A reporter (who accompanies Clarke, Young Kirby, Doctor May and Mitchell on a tour of the mill).
- A Quaker woman. She aids Deborah during and after prison, and provides a grave for Hugh. She provides the only sincere assistance to the poor in the story.
- The narrator who recounts the story is an unknown person of some higher class. "Many scholars assume the narrative voice is female." She or he possesses the korl woman statue as the only remaining evidence of Hugh's existence.
- The Korl Woman. A sculpture that was created by Hugh, which showcases Hugh's artistic talent. She is made out of korl. The Korl woman represents industrialism's effect on the working class.

== Style ==
Life in the Iron Mills must be considered a central text in the origins of American realism, American proletarian literature, and American feminism, according to Jean Pfaelzer. The story was revolutionary in its compelling portrait of the working class's powerlessness to break the oppressive chains of industrial capitalism. Author of The Utopian Novel in America, 1886-1896 (1984) and many articles on Davis, Pfaelzer edits the volume's literary selections and supplies the substantial critical introduction, which maintains that Davis inherited the sentimental literary tradition but nonetheless wrote "common stories" that "exposed the tension between sentimentalism, a genre predicated on the repression of the self, and realism, a genre predicated on the search for individual identity." Davis's realistic depiction of the gritty, hellish mills and the impoverished workers' lives is far removed from the material advantages of the upper classes often portrayed in domestic fiction. She also uses the vernacular and dialect skillfully to depict realistically her uneducated immigrant characters and to emphasize their lower-class status. Davis counteracts positive images of healthy, wholesome mill girls and mills as ideal places of work. Life in the Iron Mills challenges the optimism of transcendentalism by showing how industrialism fueled by greedy capitalists destroys the natural environment and the human spirit.

== Literary analysis and main themes ==
=== Feminism ===
Life in the Iron Mills is one of the earliest American Realist stories published. It was Rebecca Harding Davis's first published work, first appearing anonymously in the April 1861 issue of The Atlantic Monthly. After its publication, it caused a literary sensation with its powerful naturalism that anticipated the work of Émile Zola, Theodore Dreiser and Frank Norris. It was reprinted in the early 1970s by the Feminist Press with a well-known afterword by Tillie Olsen and has continued to be an important text for those who study labor and women’s issues. Anticipating post-Darwinian naturalism, Davis's most famous depiction of the redundant, dehumanizing servitude of American labor in Life in the Iron-Mills (initially an anonymous publication) may be American literature's first industrial muckraker. Its graphic probe into ethnicity, vocation, and class also encompasses, according to Pfaelzer, what became Davis's most characteristic subject and theme: strong women and powerlessness.

"Life in the Iron Mills" reworks Davis's struggles with the problems of thwarted vocation, feminine longing and the alienation of an immigrant (and in an allusion to a textile mill, an interracial) industrial proletariat. Davis's is not only a dual projection of resentments at her own domestic and artistic oppression, but also an ambitious bi-gender proletarian narrative. Nevertheless, the authorial decision to use dual protagonists highlights even more greatly the sexual division of labor, the social relations between working men and workingwomen that is produced, and the very nature of the female work character.

Davis takes pains to initiate her readers into the knowledge of hitherto little acknowledged social realities; she seems a pioneer exploring a territory which, by the end of the nineteenth century, would be recognized as the new American wilderness. Davis's story comes to life not as a work which is admirable because it is almost realistic, but as a work which astonishes and informs its past and present readers because it shares in and extends the accomplishments of the romance.

=== Immigration and industrialization ===
The story also "launched a pathbreaking exposé of the effects of capitalism and industrialization, including the physical, spiritual, and intellectual starvation of immigrant wage earners. In fact, the novel is recognized as being the first literary work in America to focus on the relationships among industrial work, poverty, and the exploitation of immigrants within a capitalistic economy". Life in the Iron Mills is an explosive study of the working poor, prophetic of the class struggle that would fill the main chapters of nineteenth century labor history. Davis's story is remarkable for its solidarity with the cause of the workers. Writers who took up the subject of the labor wars more typically enlisted on the side of corporate authority. As Davis shows, the Industrial Revolution also brought with it class distinctions clearly exhibited by the material wealth of capitalists and industrialists who possessed the means to build lavish homes with elaborate architecture. In contrast, factory workers and other unskilled laborers often lived in crowded boardinghouses and small apartments. Because they lived in such deplorable and disorderly conditions, held such lower-class status, and faced the stress and uncertainty of work, many wage earners indulged in alcohol consumption. Davis effectively captures these conflicts in Life in the Iron Mills. As far as the country was concerned, immigrants saw America as a place with many job opportunities due to industrialization and urbanization. In the 1840s the nation received 1.7 million immigrants, and then 2.6 million in the 1850s. Many owners of industrial plants and mills became rich by exploiting the immigrant workers in order to provide cheap goods. Davis was said to have, "sought to make her readers aware that their material comfort was enabled neither by palliative classical gods nor by cheap coal and river barges but by real human beings, who ate, slept, and toiled in unspeakable conditions" (4).

In this short story, Davis is allowing the readers to not only experience the true reality of what work was like during this time, but she is also encouraging the readers to become social activists and take action towards change in the real world. During the beginning times of industrialization, the working conditions were terrible. All of the characters in the story lived in a town that was overtaken by pollution due to the iron mills; therefore, their town had no clean air for the residents to enjoy and the town always seemed “dirty.” Since all of these different characters had to work long hours in terrible conditions, the extreme pollution put into perspective how damaging it actually was to their health. In one scholarly journal about Life in the Iron-Mills, Jill Gatlin explains that, “She [Davis] portrays pollution not as a source of awe or a sign of wealth, nor as simply a nuisance or an annoyance, but rather as a lethal hazard to laborers”. Davis helps put into perspective how deadly the pollution can be when it is inhaled in large quantities all of the time. Life in the Iron-Mills helps bring awareness to all of the waste that is acquired through the pollution and shows that, for some, this is part of their daily lives. Due to industrialization, the manufacturing of goods increasingly grew and, therefore, there were people who were obtaining large quantities of money off of different products that were being produced. These people are known as the upper-class people and they have always looked down upon the working-class people. The working-class has always been perceived as being “dirty” and unhealthy. In the story, the working-class was seen as not being very healthy because they were the people who were always working to survive, while the upper-class people were able to live to work. The upper-class people were never seen wearing “dirty” clothes because they were able to afford a more comfortable lifestyle than the working-class people. This is still true in today’s social class outlook on society. One of the upper-class characters in the story is Mitchell. Mitchell didn’t see the working-class people as humans, let alone equals. He instead saw the working-class people more as objects. According to Wanlin Li, another scholarly journal writer, “The reaction of Mitchell reflects the usual way that upper class travelers or mental travelers reading picturesque travel narratives look at the lower class: they view them as aesthetic objects”. Most upper-class people think they are better than others no matter what, and ultimately, they end up stepping all over the working-class people. Because of this, the upper-class men see the mill workers more as objects than as humans during this beginning time of industrialization. This still happens in today’s society as well. Davis wrote this story because she wanted to see change in the world. She also wanted to create people who would stand up, demand change, and do something about the horrible conditions that mill workers had to endure during the nineteenth century. During the beginning times of industrialization, working conditions were horrible for the working-class, and Davis is able to portray the extreme division of social classes accurately throughout the story.

== Reception ==
In the late 1800s Life in the Iron Mills received national criticism when published in The Atlantic Monthly. Many readers of the Monthly believed that the author of the story was a man because of Davis's strong language and use of realism. Davis also published her early works anonymously, but as she gained fame from The Atlantic Monthly she began to sign her name to her work. Life in the Iron Mills took readers away from abolitionist and Civil War conflicts, and reminded them of the community of iron workers going through injustice as well. Davis also had strong literary supporters such as Ralph Waldo Emerson, Nathaniel Hawthorne, and many others.

Rebecca Harding Davis disappeared from the literary world after ending her publications in The Atlantic Monthly. Life in the Iron Mills regained critical reception with the help of Tillie Olsen. In the 1970s many feminist supporters wrote about the power of Rebecca Harding Davis's short story. Norma Rosen, the author of "Joy to Revine" explains her first experience when reading Life in the Iron Mills: "With this book, Life in the Iron Mills in my hand, I feel I am standing in corridor of echoes". Another critic, Federick Whittacker, describes Rebecca Harding Davis as a writer who takes part in the concept "Knight of labor", which too Whittacker represents writers who create literary fiction concerning the iron mill labor force in the 1800s. Life in the Iron Mills, was considered by most critics during the 1970s and 1980s, as one of the first works representing the iron mill labor force through realism.

Life in the Iron mills still inspires literary criticism. Davis's short story has its own Bedford Cultural Edition, which introduces Life in the Iron Mills literary importance during the 19th century. The Bedford edition also explores the relation of Davis to the short story, and how her background influences the narrative. Many critics explore the different themes that can be interpreted in the short story and its relation to the authors environment and historical context. Sheila Hassle Hughes exemplifies the conflicts that arise among critics about the themes Life in the Iron Mills represents:

Scholars have generally found it difficult to reconcile Davis's radical form with the religious, specifically Christian, features of her tale. Two critics who have attempted to address this tension come to quite different conclusions. Sharon Harris reads the work as a critique of "passive Christianity", but her study of irony fails to address adequately the remaining constructive or stubbornly spiritual elements of Life in the Iron Mills. William H. Shurr, on the other hand, reads the story as a conversion narrative. While his approach highlights more of the ambiguities in Davis's religious rhetoric, it depends upon a dichotomy between the political and the spiritual which does not do full justice to Davis's text either. Harris's reading emphasizes the text's religious elements as an aspect of form that the political content ironically undoes, whereas Shurr tends to undermine the social aspects of the tale through his religious form criticism.

— Sheila Hassell Hughes, A Liberationist Reading of Class and Gender in Life in the Iron Mills

== Legacy ==
Rebecca Harding Davis's Life in the Iron Mills, was recognized as a significant short story by writers such as Emily Dickinson, Louisa May Alcott, and Nathaniel Hawthorne among many others. Elizabeth Stuart Phelps Ward was also inspired to write the short story "The Tenth of January", which dealt with a mill that collapsed in Lawrence, Massachusetts in 1868, after reading the story. Tillie Olsen's work on Life in the Iron Mills in her book Silences also brought new attention to the work; it is now also recognized as the starting point for the use of realism in literature representing the labor force.
