= Lawrence Schimel =

American writer, translator, and anthologist

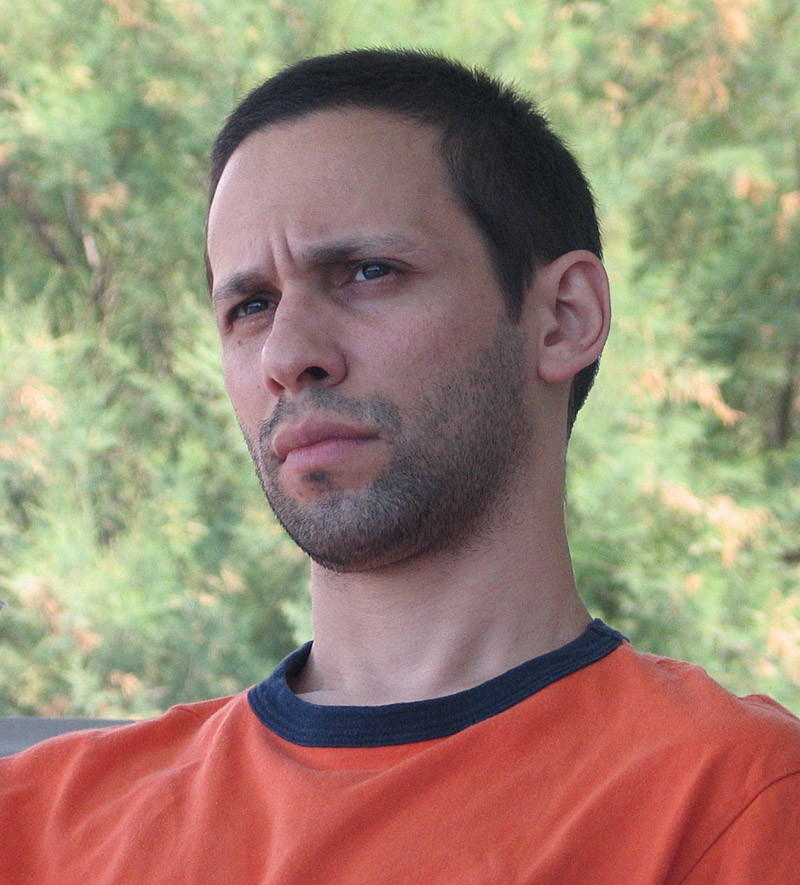
Lawrence Schimel, 2008

Lawrence Schimel (born October 16, 1971) is a bilingual (Spanish/English) American writer, translator, and anthologist. His work, which frequently deals with gay and lesbian themes as well as matters of Jewish identity, often falls into the genres of science fiction and fantasy and takes the form of both poetry and prose for adults and for children.

== Biography ==
=== Early life ===
Schimel was born in New York City. He is Jewish and identifies as a post-Zionist.

=== Education and career ===
Schimel obtained a B.A. in literature from Yale University.

Schimel is a member of the National Book Critics Circle and the Academy of American Poets. He is a founding member of the Publishing Triangle, an organization of lesbians and gay men in the publishing industry, which he chaired for two terms (1996–1998).

Schimel's short stories and poetry have appeared in a wide range of anthologies and literary journals. He has also acted as editor or co-editor of numerous short story anthologies from Arsenal Pulp Press, St. Martin's Press, Cumberland House, and others; many of these collections feature work engaging in LGBTQ+ themes.

In addition to his work as a writer and editor, he is a translator to and from Spanish of poetry, prose fiction, and children's books.

In 2021, Schimel's rainbow family board books Early One Morning and Bedtime, Not Playtime! caused controversy in Hungary, with a Hungarian bookseller being fined for selling these books on the grounds that putting books depicted same-sex couples was an unfair commercial practice, as "[C]ontent which deviates from the norm.... The book was there among other fairytale books and thus committed a violation," Pest County Commissioner Richard Tarnai said. "There is no way of knowing that this book is about a family that is different than a normal family."

== Published works ==
=== Short story collections ===
- The Drag Queen of Elfland (Circlet)
- His Tongue
- Two Boys in Love
- Una barba para dos

=== Poetry collections ===
- Fairy Tales for Writers (A Midsummer Nights Press)
- Deleted Names (A Midsummer Nights Press)
- Desayuno en la cama

=== Graphic novel ===
- Vacation in Ibiza (NBM Publishing)

=== Children's books ===
Schimel has written over sixty children's books, including:

- Bedtime, Not Playtime! - originally written in Spanish
- Early One Morning - originally written in Spanish
- Read a Book With Me
- Let's Go See Papá!
- ¡Qué suerte tengo!, by Lawrence Schimel, illus. by Juan Camilo Mayorga (Rey Naranjo)

=== Translations into English ===
- The Wild Book by Juan Villoro (Restless Books, USA; HopeRoad Publishing, UK)
- Monteverde: Memoirs of an Interstellar Linguist by Lola Robles (Aqueduct)
- I Offer My Heart as a Target by Johanny Vázquez Paz
- Out In the Open by Jesús Carraso, adapted by Javi Rey
- Buñuel: In the Labyrinth of Turtles by Fermín Solis (SelfMadeHero)
- La Bastarda by Trifonia Melibea Obono
- The Trojan War: A Graphic Novel of The Iliad by Nicolás Schuff (Eerdmans Books for Young Readers)
- The Adventures of Odysseus: A Graphic Novel of The Odyssey by Nicolás Schuff (Eerdmans Books for Young Readers)

=== Translations into Spanish ===
- Collective Amnesia by Koleka Putuma, with Arate Hidalgo
- Nos llamaron enemigo, graphic novel memoir by George Takei (Top Shelf)
- Bluets by Maggie Nelson (Tres Puntos)
- El Arte de la Crueldad by Maggie Nelson (Tres Puntos)
- Tú Eres Tú by Richard Van Camp and Julie Flett (Orca)
- Con Hilo Y Aguja by Jennifer Stempel (Kalaniot Books)

== Recognition ==
PoMoSexuals, an anthology co-edited by Schimel, won the 1998 Lambda Award for Best Transgender Book. First Person Queer, edited by Schimel, won the 2008 Lambda in the Best LGBT Anthologies category. As of 2026, twelve other books written, translated, or edited by Schimel have been shortlisted in other categories of the Lamba Award over the years.

In 2002, Schimel's poem "How to Make a Human" placed first in the Long category of the annual Rhysling Awards. His translation to English of Sofía Rhei's short-form poem "embalsamado" (as "embalmed") won the 2019 Dwarf Stars Award.

In 2005, Schimel's No hay nada como el original was selected by the International Youth Library, Munich, as a White Ravens Book. In 2020, his picture book Qué suerte tengo!, translated into Maltese as Meta Mmur għand Sieħbi Carlos by Clare Azzopardi, was a finalist for the Maltese National Book Prize. Also in 2020, Schimel's translation of Some Days by María Wernicke (AmazonCrossing) was chosen as a 2021 USBBY Outstanding International title by the United States Board on Books for Youth and as a Notable Translation of 2020 by World Literature Today.

Schimel's ¡Qué suerte tengo! was also chosen by IBBY for Outstanding Books for Young People with Disabilities.

Hatchet, Schimel's translation of Carmen Boullosa's poetry collection Hamartia, won the Cliff Becker Book Prize in Translation. Schimel's translation of Poems the Wind Blew In by Karmelo C. Iribarren won a PEN Translates Award (EnglishPEN) and a Highly Commended Award from the CLiPPA. Schimel's translation of Voice of the Two Shores by Agnès Agboton was a recipient of a PEN Translates Award (EnglishPEN).

I Offer My Heart as a Target, Schimel's translation of Johanny Vázquez Paz' Ofresco mi corazón como una diana, is a recipient of the Paz Prize for poetry.

Several other translations by Schimel have been shortlisted or longlisted for other literary translation awards.
