= Florence Howe =

American feminist writer (1929–2020)

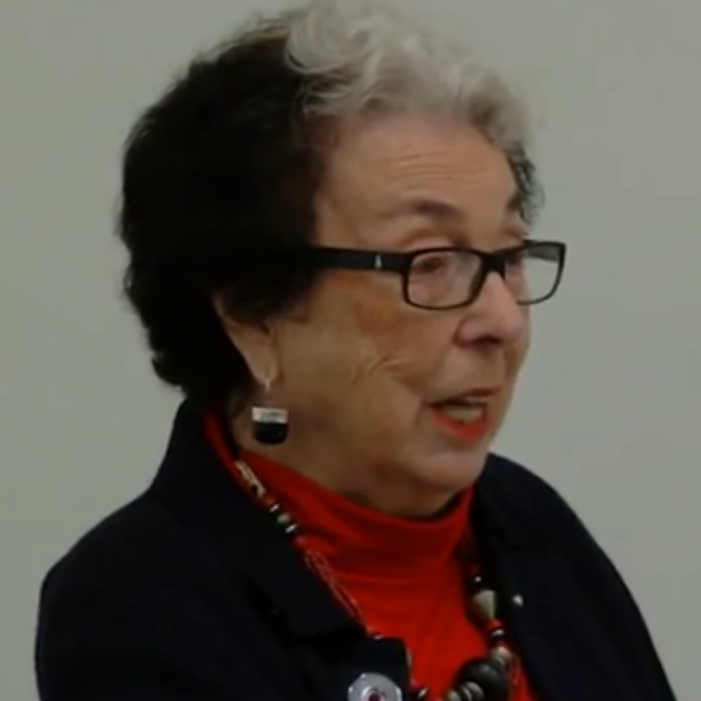
- Howe in 2014
- Born: Florence Rosenfeld; March 17, 1929; Brooklyn, New York
- Died: September 12, 2020 (aged 91); New York, New York

Academic background
- Education: Hunter College, City University of New York; Smith College, Northampton, Massachusetts

Academic work
- Main interests: Feminist author, publisher, literary scholar and historian

Florence Rosenfeld Howe (March 17, 1929 – September 12, 2020) was an American author, publisher, literary scholar, and historian who is considered to have been a leader of the contemporary feminist movement.

== Early life ==
Born in Brooklyn, New York, on March 17, 1929, Florence Howe was the daughter of Samuel, a taxi driver, and Frances Stilly Rosenfeld, a bookkeeper. Howe loved learning from a young age. Her mother encouraged her daughter to follow a teaching career.

== Education ==
In 1943, Howe entered New York City's highly selective Hunter College High School. She was one of only five young women from Brooklyn to do so. She graduated high school early and attended Hunter College. In 1949, she was awarded entrance to Phi Beta Kappa, the elite academic organization which commends superlative academic achievement. Various people in power encouraged her to take graduate courses in literature and to become a college professor. After receiving a BA in English in 1950 from Hunter College, Howe entered Smith College and earned an MA in English in 1951. In 1954, Howe attended the University of Wisconsin, resuming her work in graduate studies for art history and literature. She was awarded an honorary doctorate by DePauw University in 1987.

== Career ==
In 1960, Howe was employed as an assistant professor in the English department at a private women's college, Goucher College, located in Maryland. She taught African American children in a Mississippi freedom school during 1964 and chaired the Modern Language Association commission on the Status of Women in the Profession. In 1964, Howe's book Myths of Coeducation, featured one of her essays titled “Mississippi Freedom Schools: the Politics of Education.” In 1965, the essay was published in the Harvard Education Review. This essay written by Howe explains her journey with feminism and how she was able to relate issues such as education, race and politics within feminism. In 1967, she signed a public statement declaring her intention to refuse to pay income taxes in protest against the U.S. war against Vietnam. In 1970, Howe founded The Feminist Press, "an educational nonprofit organization founded to advance women's rights and amplify feminist perspectives", the organization had published three books by 1973. In 1973, Florence Howe took on the role of President of the Modern Language Association after being voted in. In 1978, another essay written by Howe titled “Myths of Coeducation”, explains women's education and how it “functions within the patriarchal limits of the society in which it exists.” From 1972 to 1982, Florence Howe assisted in editing the Women's Studies Quarterly, a peer-reviewed journal. In 1977, Florence Howe was presented with an honorary doctorate in humane letters from New England College. In 1979, Florence Howe was presented with another honorary doctorate in humane letters, given by Skidmore College. Florence Howe was responsible in co-editing various literature pieces throughout the years, such as “With Wings: An Anthology of Literature By and About Disabled Women (1987); Traditions and the Talents of Women (1991); and No More Masks (1993).” In 1982, Florence Howe published the Feminist Scholarship: The Extent of the Revolution, a journal article in which she wrote about her findings with feminism in higher education. In the years 1983 and 1993, Florence Howe served as a U.S. Department of State Grantee. In 1987, Howe was employed as a professor of humanities at SUNY.

== Personal life ==
Howe married three times during the 1950s–1960s, and took the last name of one of her husbands, Ed Howe. She married Paul Lauter in the 1960s and divorced him in 1987.

In 1964, while living in Baltimore, Florence Howe travelled to Jackson, Mississippi, as a Freedom Summer volunteer and was tasked with serving as a teacher in a Freedom School for black children. There she met a 16-year-old girl, Alice Jackson, with whom she became close. Jackson came with her to Baltimore and Florence became her second mother, although an adoption was never formalized.

Howe had no children of her own, and she was survived by Jackson, her two children and four grandchildren, who referred to Florence Howe as Baba.

== Death ==
Florence Howe died on September 12, 2020, in New York City, at the age of 91. She lived on the Upper West Side in Manhattan, and prior to her death received hospice care for Parkinson's disease.

== The Florence Howe Award ==
The Florence Howe Award for feminist scholarship of the Women's Caucus for the Modern Languages is named in her honor. The Florence Howe Award is an annual feminist scholarship acknowledging two outstanding essays by members of the Women's Caucus, one from the field of English and one from a foreign language. The authors receive $250 and are honored at an event hosted by the Women's Caucus at the annual MLA meeting.

== Selected bibliography ==
=== Books ===
- Howe, Florence; Ahlum, Carol (1970). Female studies: collected by the Commission on the Status of Women of the Modern Language Association. Pittsburgh: Know Inc. ISBN 9780912786025.
- Howe, Florence; Lauter, Paul (1970). The conspiracy of the young. New York: World Publishing Co. OCLC 106506.
- Howe, Florence (1993) [1973]. No more masks!: an anthology of twentieth-century American women poets. New York: Harper Perennial. ISBN 9780060552626.
- Howe, Florence (1975). Women and the power to change. New York: McGraw-Hill. ISBN 9780070101241.
- Howe, Florence (1977). Seven years later: women's studies programs in 1976: a report of the National Advisory Council on Women's Educational Programs. Washington D.C.: National Advisory Council on Women's Educational Programs. OCLC 4188651.
- Howe, Florence; Lauter, Paul (1978). The women's movement: impact on the campus and curriculum. Washington D.C.: American Association for Higher Education. OCLC 4261912.
- Howe, Florence; Hoffman, Nancy (1979). Women working: an anthology of stories and poems. Old Westbury, New York: The Feminist Press. ISBN 9780912670577.
- Howe, Florence; Lauter, Paul (1980). The impact of women's studies on the campus and the disciplines. Washington D.C.: U.S. Department of Health, Education, and Welfare, National Institute of Education, Program on Teaching and Learning. OCLC 6766027.
- Howe, Florence; Howard, Suzanne; Boehm Strauss, Mary Jo (1982). Everywoman's guide to colleges and universities: an educational project of the Feminist Press. Old Westbury, New York: The Feminist Press. ISBN 9780935312096.
- Howe, Florence (1984). Myths of coeducation: selected essays, 1964–1983. Bloomington, Indiana: Indiana University Press. ISBN 9780253203397.
- Howe, Florence; Saxton, Marsha (1987). With wings: an anthology of literature by and about women with disabilities. New York: The Feminist Press. ISBN 9780935312614.
- Howe, Florence; Faragher, John Mack (1988). Women and higher education in American history: essays from the Mount Holyoke College Sesquicentennial Symposia. New York: W. W. Norton & Company. ISBN 9780393025019.
- Howe, Florence (1991). Tradition and the talents of women. Urbana, Illinois: University of Illinois Press. ISBN 9780252016851.
- Howe, Florence; Casella, Jean (2000). Almost touching the skies: women's coming of age stories. New York: The Feminist Press. ISBN 9781558612341. 30th anniversary edition.
- Howe, Florence (2000). The politics of women's studies: testimony from thirty founding mothers. New York: The Feminist Press. ISBN 9781558612419. Introduction by Mari Jo Buhle
- Howe, Florence (2011). A life in motion. New York: The Feminist Press. ISBN 9781558616974.

=== Chapters in books ===
- Howe, Florence (2000), "Learning from teaching", in Howe, Florence (ed.), The politics of women's studies: testimony from thirty founding mothers, New York: The Feminist Press, pp. 3–15, ISBN 9781558612419. Introduction by Mari Jo Buhle

=== Other ===
She contributed the piece "The Proper Study of Womankind: Women's Studies" to the 2003 anthology Sisterhood Is Forever: The Women's Anthology for a New Millennium, edited by Robin Morgan.
