= Rebecca Harding Davis =

American author and journalist

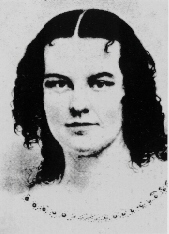
- Born: Rebecca Blaine Harding; June 24, 1831; Washington, Pennsylvania
- Died: September 29, 1910 (aged 79); Mount Kisco, New York
- Writing career
- Genres: Fiction, journalism, poetry
- Notable work: Life in the Iron Mills

Rebecca Blaine Harding Davis (June 24, 1831 – September 29, 1910) was an American author and journalist. She was a pioneer of literary realism in American literature. She graduated valedictorian from Washington Female Seminary in Pennsylvania. Her most important literary work is the short story "Life in the Iron-Mills," published in the April 1861 edition of The Atlantic Monthly. Throughout her lifetime, Davis sought to effect social change for African Americans, women, Native Americans, immigrants, and the working class, by intentionally writing about the plight of these marginalized groups in the 19th century.

== Early life ==
Rebecca Blaine Harding was born at the David Bradford House in Washington, Pennsylvania, on June 24, 1831, to Richard and Rachel Leet Wilson Harding. Rebecca was the eldest of five children. After an unsuccessful entrepreneurial spell in Big Spring, Alabama, the family finally settled in 1836 in Wheeling, which at the time was in Virginia (in the portion of the state that is now West Virginia). At the time, Wheeling was developing into a productive factory town, the concentration of which was iron and steel mills. The environment of Rebecca's home town would later affect the themes and vision of her fiction, like "Life in the Iron-Mills." Despite Wheeling's productivity and its accessible location along the Ohio River, Davis described the world of her childhood as having belonged to a slower, simpler time, writing in her 1904 autobiography Bits of Gossip that, "there were no railways in it, no automobiles or trolleys, no telegraphs, no sky-scraping houses. Not a single man in the country was the possessor of huge accumulations of money such as are so common now", being before their invention in the Second Industrial Revolution.

== Education ==
During the earlier part of Davis's childhood, public schools in her hometown were not yet available. Her education was mainly undertaken by her mother, with occasional instruction from tutors. While being home-schooled, Rebecca read such authors as Harriet Beecher Stowe, sisters Anna and Susan Warner, and Maria Cummins, which initiated her interest in literature. When Davis was fourteen, she was sent to Washington, Pennsylvania to live with her mother's sister, and attend the Washington Female Seminary. She graduated as class valedictorian in 1848, at the age of seventeen. Rebecca described the school as "enough math to do accounts, enough astronomy to point out constellations, a little music and drawing, and French, history, literature at discretion". After returning to Wheeling, she joined the staff of the local newspaper, the Intelligencer, submitting reviews, stories, poems, and editorials, and also serving briefly as an editor in 1859.

== Personal life and family ==
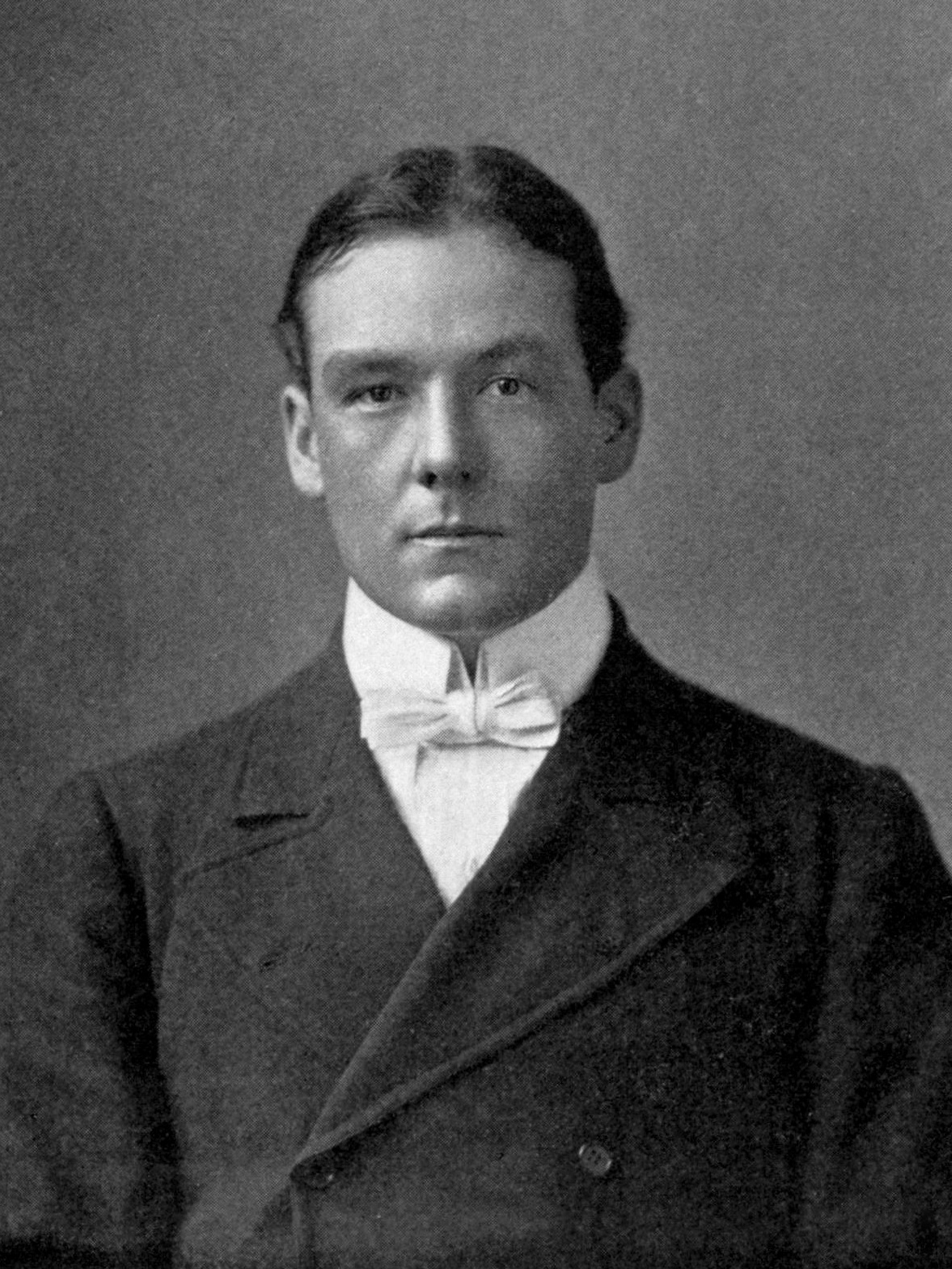
Rebecca's eldest son, Richard Harding Davis, c. 1903

Upon returning to her industrial hometown, Wheeling, Rebecca Harding Davis socialized very little, staying largely within her own family circle. She continued this isolated way of life for thirteen years until the publication of Life in the Iron Mills in 1861.

Life in the Iron Mills, published in The Atlantic Monthly in April 1861, is regarded by many critics as a pioneering document marking the beginning of realism in American literature. The successful publication of the short story also won her acclaim in the literary circles of her time. At the time it was published, Harding was acknowledged as a "brave new voice" by Louisa May Alcott and Ralph Waldo Emerson. They were impressed with the author's goal, which was "to dig into the commonplace, this vulgar American life, and see what is in it". She later met and became acquainted with Emerson whilst staying with Nathaniel Hawthorne during a trip she had long delayed to meet her publisher James T. Fields. She greatly admired both of these American writers. During this trip around the North, which originated with her publisher's desire to meet her personally, Davis also became close friends with her publisher's wife, Annie Adams Fields.

On her journey back from a meeting with her publisher, Rebecca met L. Clarke Davis in Philadelphia, Pennsylvania, whom she had been corresponding with since he had contacted her as an admirer of her work after the publication of "Life in the Iron-Mills." They became engaged one week after meeting and were married on March 5, 1863. Clarke was four years younger than Davis and not yet financially or professionally established in the world. The following year she gave birth to their first son, Richard Harding Davis, who was to become a writer and journalist himself. Their second son, Charles Belmont Davis was born in 1866 and also became a writer; their daughter, Nora, in 1872.

At the start of their marriage, Rebecca was the primary income provider for the family, as Clarke worked to establish himself in his law career. She accomplished this through her writing and as an editor for the New York Tribune. However, ten years after their marriage Davis had faded substantially from the literary world. Clarke gave up law and became an editor for The Philadelphia Inquirer as well. In 1892, Davis received success with Silhouettes of American Life.

She died at age 79, on September 29, 1910.

== Legacy ==
A prolific writer, Rebecca Harding Davis is credited with over 500 published works. Despite her outpouring of literary works, she was almost entirely forgotten by the time of her death in 1910. However, Davis was rediscovered in the very early 1970s by the feminist writer Tillie Olsen, who found a collection of Davis's works in a junk shop. Olsen quickly recognized the talent and significance of Davis's writings, and personally endeavored to reintroduce Davis's work. In 1972, The Feminist Press published "Life in the Iron-Mills" with Olsen's own biographical interpretation of Davis's life in relation to a selection of her published works. Olsen's non-fiction volume, titled Silences, was an analysis of authors' silent periods in literature, including writer's blocks, unpublished work, and the problems that working-class writers, and women in particular, have in finding the time to concentrate on their art, and the second part of the book was a study of the work of Davis.

In April 2013, a historical marker in Davis's honor was placed near Swanson Science Center, the site of the former McIlvaine Hall/Washington Female Seminary. The effort to place the marker there was led by Jennifer Harding, a Washington & Jefferson College English professor, who has no biological relationship to the author. The historical marker was the first dedicated to a woman in Washington, Pennsylvania.

In 2013, an issue of Topic: The Washington & Jefferson College Review was dedicated to articles about Davis.

A thorough biography titled Rebecca Harding Davis: A Life Among Writers by Sharon M. Harris (Morgantown: West Virginia University Press, 2018) (ISBN 978-1-946684-30-1) appeared after biographical writing by Jane Atteridge Rose and Jean Pfaelzer.

== Major work: "Life in the Iron-Mills" ==
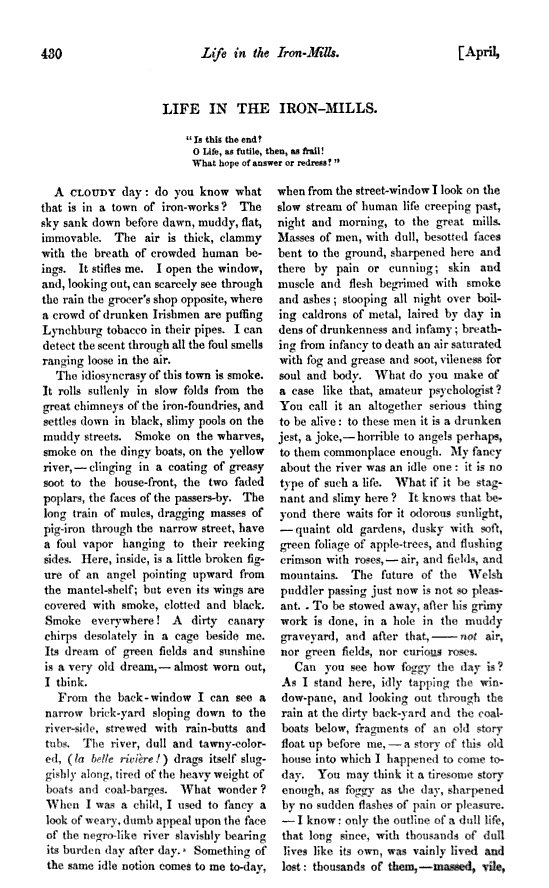
First page of the short story "Life in the Iron-Mills", as first published in The Atlantic Monthly

"Life in the Iron Mills;" or, The Korl Woman is widely considered Rebecca Harding Davis's most significant work. Published in 1861 in The Atlantic Monthly, "Life in the Iron-Mills" was one of the first works to explore industrialization in American literature. The short story saw its publication around the dawn of the American Civil War, and is one of Davis's earliest published works. It has become an important text not only for its artistic merit, but for its historical implications. Both its form and content were ground breaking at the time of its publication, being a narrative that follows the lives of laborers and the consequences of industrialization, in a traditionally realistic style.

"Life in the Iron-Mills" is set in a small village whose center is industrial work, especially that of the iron mills. It is described as a polluted and oppressive village, inhabited by laborers, mostly "masses of men, with dull, besotted faces bent to the ground, sharpened here and there by pain or cunning; skin and muscle and flesh begrimed with smoke and ashes". The short story's protagonist is Hugh Wolfe, an iron mill laborer who possesses artistic talent and a spiritual desire for higher forms of pleasure and fulfillment. Despite the hopefulness of Wolfe's artistic drive, he becomes the story's tragic hero, as his yearning for a better life leads to his imprisonment and ultimate death.

Though the short story is concerned with larger themes such as industrialization and the working class, Davis's depiction of Hugh Wolfe, and her command of realism allows the reader to focus on the individual within the labor class, and the consequences of its realities upon his heart and soul. In "Life in the Iron-Mills," "Harding reveals what, historically was done to workers and suggests what could be done for them, moral education and social uplift."

== Style ==
Rebecca Harding Davis's literary style is most commonly labeled as realism. However, her literary works mark a transition from romanticism to literary realism, so they combine elements of Sentimentalism, Romanticism, Realism, and Naturalism. For instance, "Life in the Iron Mills" uses sentimental elements such as a narrator who directly addresses the well defined reader, a didactic purpose, and characters in extreme situations for the purpose of emotionally stirring the reader to action. The short story also uses Romantic elements such as a statue symbolizing a spiritually hungry woman and owned by the narrator, reminiscent of the relic found in the custom house by the narrator of Nathaniel Hawthorne's The Scarlet Letter. And it uses a realistic style with journalistic specificity and characters typical of their social class and speaking in its vernacular, comparable to that of writers in the height of American literary realism, which came two decades after the text was published. Although realism is the genre most prominently attached to Davis's collective works, naturalism is also prevalent in her writing style. Naturalism is thematically linked to realism. Where realists, like Davis, endeavor to depict reality, naturalists expand on that reality by approaching the scientific and or psychological influences on characters due to their environments. In Life in the Iron Mills, the two genres are blended to create a realistic depiction of the everyday life of iron mill worker Hugh Wolfe, as well as illustrate the effects of that environment upon him. In addition to realism and naturalism, Davis also published works employing such literary genres as the gothic and folklore.

== Themes ==
Recurring themes in Rebecca Harding Davis's works are the social and political issues of the nineteenth-century: the American Civil War, race, regionalism, the working class, and women.

=== Industrialism ===
Having lived in the steel town of Wheeling, West Virginia, Davis had first-hand experience with the controversies and hardships associated with industrialism. She utilizes the theme of industrialism in Life in the Iron Mills by calling attention to the dark and dismal setting of the iron mills. She not only provides vivid imagery of the dismal landscape, but imagery of the working class as well. By exploring the effects of the iron mills on its inhabitants, Davis is able to depict her own concerns and frustrations associated with the marginalization of the working class. Davis's depiction of the daily routines of the laboring class is a common theme throughout her writing, and most importantly serves the purpose of unveiling the maltreatment of such individuals. Her goal in relating the physical and mental starvation that plagues the inhabitants of these mills is to urge her audience to form spiritual solutions to these issues rather than social solutions.

=== Female social roles ===
The exploration of female social roles in nineteenth-century society is a common theme in Davis's works. Her female characters can be viewed as early proto-feminist symbols because they exemplify the issues surrounding the commodification of women, and the patriarchal society that places restrictions on female identity. These issues can be seen in the heroine of Davis's novel Margret Howth. Though Howth works in the mills, her issues flow from her relations with her male counterparts. At novel's end she marries Stephen Holmes, which can both symbolize her acceptance of her Christian destiny despite her father's protestations, and her acceptance of the role of wife and mother. Through this character Davis is representing the power that patriarchal society has over the nineteenth-century female, while also presenting a strong female character who recognizes her moral independence. Davis goes further in her exploration of the true female identity by addressing the role domesticity plays in the lives of her characters. Domesticity, which once defined the roles of nineteenth-century women, is altered by Davis's placement of women in the iron mills. By describing the harsh conditions under which these women labored, Davis is capitalizing on the idea that women are capable of integrating work life into their home life.

Another work in which Davis depicts the power of a female figure is Life in the Iron Mills. The Korl Woman, sculpted by Hugh Wolfe, represents an all-encompassing sublime image of laboring class womanhood. The intensity with which this figure is received, and the humanistic quality of its structure relay a message intended to reveal the true image of not only laborers, but female beauty as well. The Korl woman serves as a symbol that challenges nineteenth-century standards of femininity. Thus, Davis utilizes the Korl Woman to depict the realistic effects of the iron mills, while simultaneously questioning female societal restrictions as a whole.

== Works (partial list) ==
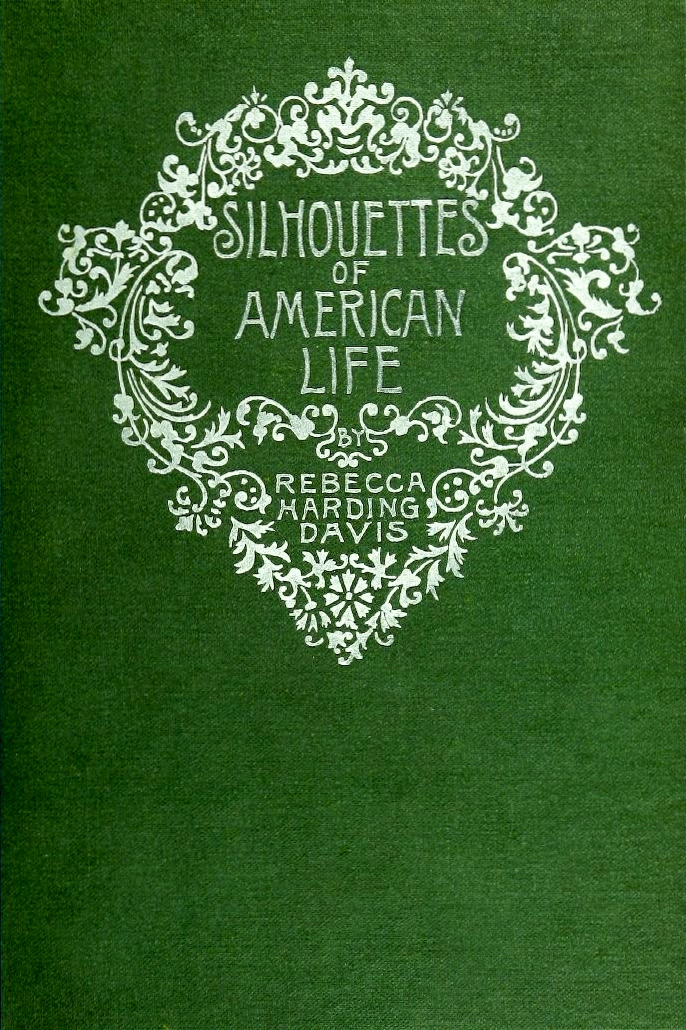
First edition cover of Silhouettes of American Life, 1892.

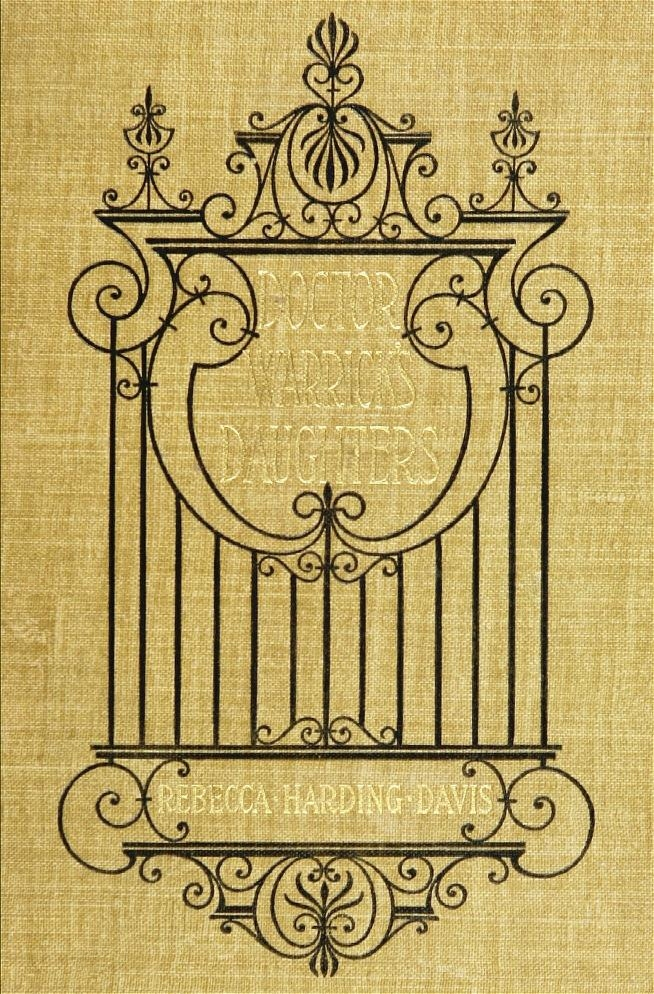
First edition cover of Doctor Warrick's Daughters, 1896.

Books

- Margret Howth: A Story of Today (1861)
- Waiting for the Verdict (1867)
- Dallas Galbraith (1868)
- Kent Hampden (1892)
- Kitty's Choice or Berrytown and Other Stories (1873)
- John Andross (1874)
- A Law unto Herself (1878)
- Natasqua (1886)
- Kent Hampden (1892)
- Silhouettes of American Life (1892)
- Doctor Warrick's Daughters (1896)
- Frances Waldeaux (1897)
- Bits of Gossip (1904)

Short fiction

- Life in the Iron Mills, The Atlantic Monthly (1861)
- David Gaunt (1862)
- John Lamar (1862)
- Paul Blecker (1863)
- The Wife's Story (July 1864), The Atlantic Monthly
- Ellen (1865)
- The Harmonists (1866)
- In the Market (1868)
- A Pearl of Great Price (1868)
- Put out of the Way (1870)
- The Balacchi Brothers (1872) Lippincott's Magazine
- General William Wirt Colby, Wood's Household Magazine (1873)
- Earthen Pitchers (1873–1874)
- Marcia (1876)
- A Day with Doctor Sarah (1878)

Essays

- Men's Rights (1869)
- The House on the Beach (1876)
- Life Saving Stations (March 1876) Lippincott's Magazine
- Some Testimony in the Case (1885)
- Here and There in the South (1887)
- Women in Literature (1891)
- In the Gray Cabins of New England (1895)
- The Disease of Money-Getting (1902)

== Sources ==
- Harris, Sharon M. Rebecca Harding Davis and American Realism. Philadelphia: U of Pennsylvania Press, 1991.
- Langford, Gerald. Book I: Rebecca. The Richard Harding Davis Years: A Biography of Mother and Son. New York: Holt, 1961.
- Pfaelzer, Jean. Parlor Radical: Rebecca Harding Davis and the Origins of American Social Realism. Pittsburgh: U of Pittsburgh Press, 1996.
- Rose, Jane Atteridge. Rebecca Harding Davis. New York: Twayne, 1993.
- Ledford, Katherine; Lloyd, Theresa, eds. (March 17, 2020). "Rebecca Harding Davis: 1831–1910". Writing Appalachia: An Anthology. Lexington, KY: University Press of Kentucky. ISBN 9780813178820.
