= Premi Flaiano =

Annual Italian awards for the arts

Premi Flaiano or Flaiano Prizes
- Current: 50th Premi Flaiano
- Premi Flaiano gold silhouette
- Awarded for: Creative writing; cinema; theater and radio-television fields
- Location: Teatro Monumentale Gabriele D'Annunzio, Pescara
- Country: Italy
- First award: 1973; 53 years ago
- Website: www.premiflaiano.it

The Premi Flaiano (English: Flaiano Prizes) are a set of Italian international awards recognizing achievements in the fields of creative writing, cinema, theatre and radio-television. Established to honour the Italian author and screenwriter Ennio Flaiano (1910–1972), the prizes have been awarded annually since 1974 at the Teatro Monumentale Gabriele D'Annunzio in Pescara, Flaiano's hometown in Abruzzo, as well as D'Annunzio's.

Since 2001 the cinema section has become a true film festival, consisting of several events and film selections presented in cinemas around the town and open to the general public. The Flaiano Film Festival is one of Italy's International Film Festivals. The Festival lasts one month (between June and July of each year), with the presentation of films in competition and out of competition, allowing the participation of thousands of spectators. The festival is enriched by several smaller festivals each year and is divided into several sections for which prizes are awarded. These include best film, best foreign film, male and female actors, director, photographer, editing, soundtrack, set design and costumes. A special jury prize is awarded, the best film of onset and also the premium carriera. The highest award given is the Flaiano gold for the film which is reserved for writers for film, directors, performers Italian and foreign critics.

== Award winners ==
=== Literary prize ===
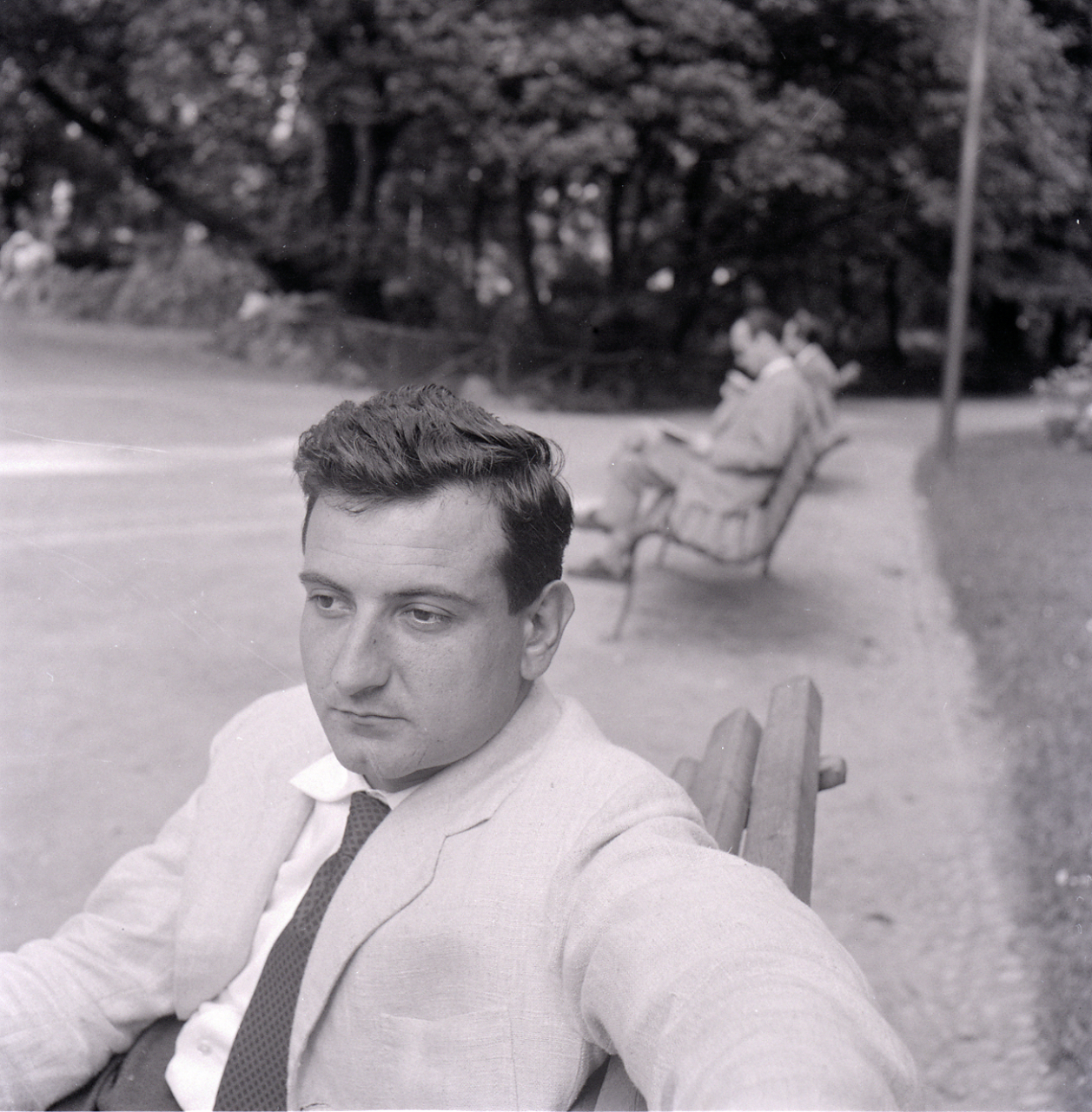
Goffredo Parise

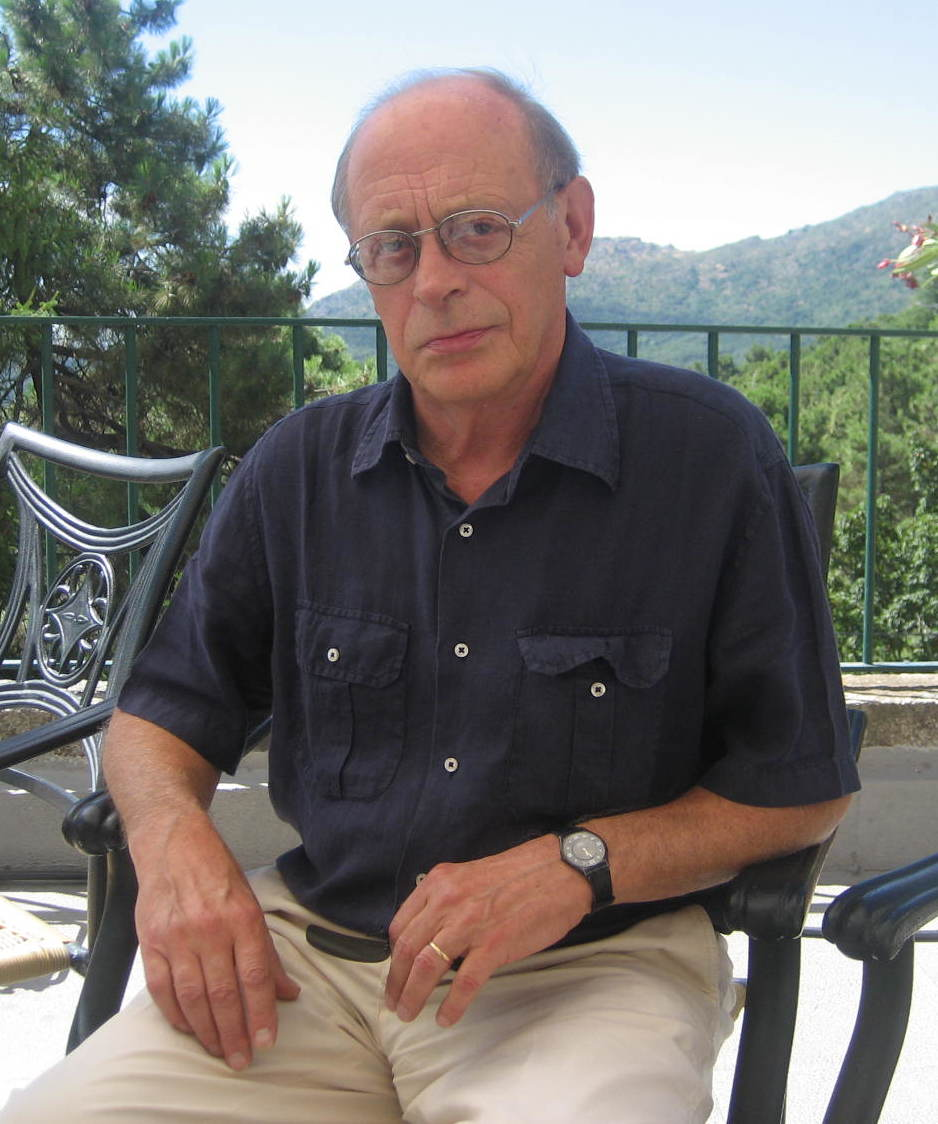
Antonio Tabucchi

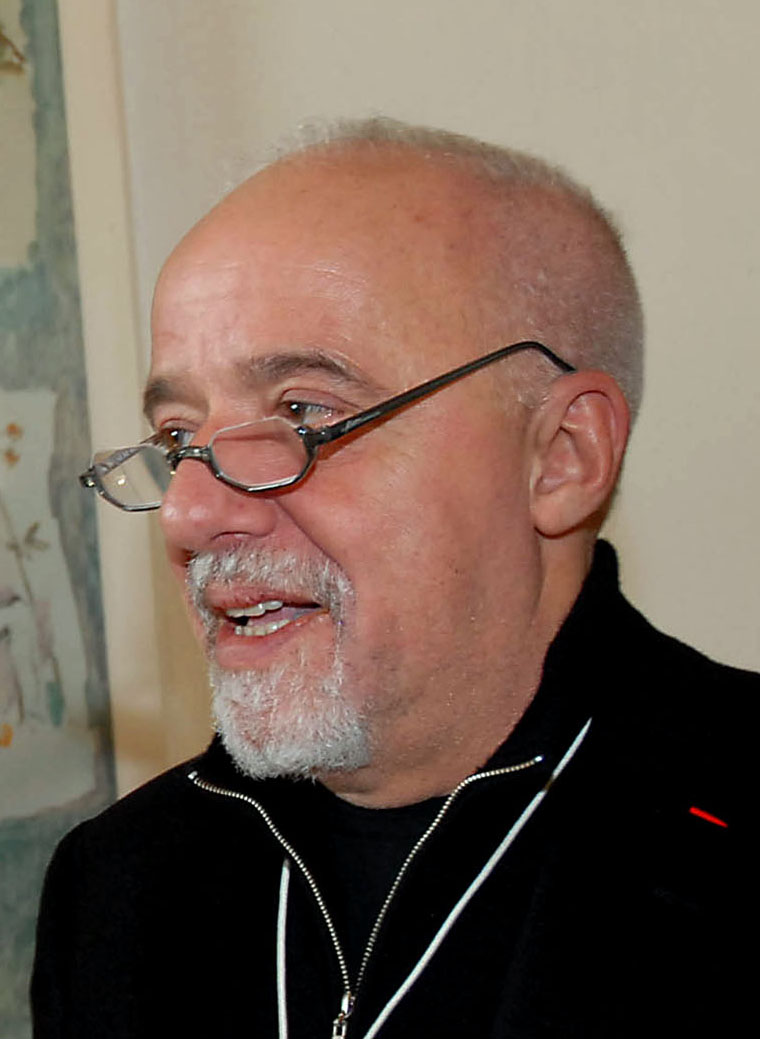
Paulo Coelho

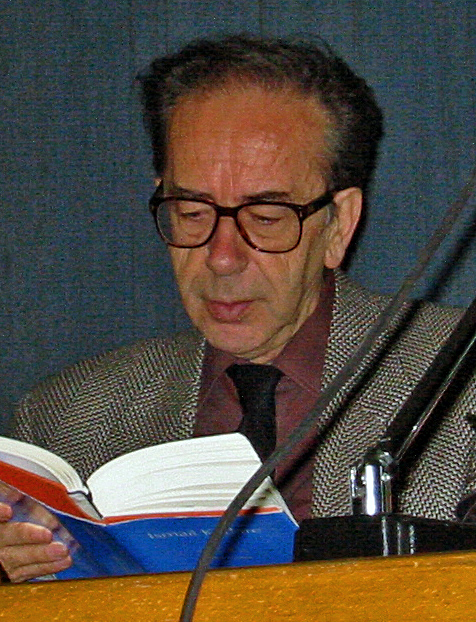
Ismail Kadare

- 1976: Emma Giammattei, Renato Minore
- 1977: Goffredo Parise
- 1978: Guido Ceronetti
- 1979: Mario Praz
- 1980: Mario Soldati
- 1981: Roberto Ridolfi
- 1982: Carlo Betocchi, Pietro Citati
- 1983: Mimì Zorzi, Gino Bacchetti
- 1984: Antonio Altomonte, Gesualdo Bufalino
- 1985: Francesco Burdin, Raffaele La Capria
- 1986: Piero Chiara, Paolo Barbaro, Mario Rigoni Stern
- 1987: Gian Luigi Piccioli, Franca Rossi, Gaetano Afeltra
- 1988: Lorenzo Mondo, Giorgio Soavi
- 1989: Maria Corti, Fruttero & Lucentini
- 1990: Luigi Malerba, Claudio Magris
- 1991: John Banville, Francesca Sanvitale, Antonio Tabucchi, Antonio Cibotto
- 1992: Peter Handke, Giuliana Morandini, José Saramago
- 1993: Jean-Marie Gustave Le Clézio, Domenico Rea, Luis Sepúlveda
- 1994: Manuel Vázquez Montalbán, Marie NDiaye, Giuseppe Pontiggia
- 1995: Daniele Del Giudice, Allan Folsom, Jostein Gaarder
- 1996: Enzo Bettiza, Paulo Coelho, Tahar Ben Jelloun, Daniel Pennac, Abraham B. Yehoshua, Ken Saro-Wiwa (in his memory)
- 1997: Tom Clancy, Dacia Maraini, Patrick Robinson
- 1998: Andrea Camilleri, Daniel Chavarría, Ian McEwan
- 1999: Vincenzo Consolo, Edwidge Danticat, Max Gallo
- 2000: Alex Garland, Javier Marías, Daniel Picouly, Fabrizia Ramondino
- 2001: Michèle Desbordes, Patrick McGrath, Roberto Pazzi
- 2002: Peter Carey, Silvana Grasso, Per Olov Enquist
- 2003: John Crowley, Antonio Muñoz Molina, Harry Mulisch, Elisabetta Rasy, Nikolaj Spasskij
- 2004: Aziz Chouaki, Paolo Di Stefano, David Grossman
- 2005: Alberto Bevilacqua, Gianni Celati, Dacia Maraini, Raffaele Nigro, Domenico Starnone
- 2006: Raffaele La Capria, Amara Lakhous, Enrique Vila-Matas
- 2007: Hisham Matar
- 2008: Alberto Arbasino, Ismail Kadaré, Alice Munro
- 2009: Eraldo Affinati
- 2010: Silvia Avallone (opera prima)
- 2011: Margaret Mazzantini, Aurelio Picca, Sandro Veronesi
- 2012: Maria Paola Colombo (opera prima)
- 2013: Marco Balzano
- 2014: Sebastiano Vassalli
- 2015: Giorgio Patrizi, Ole Meyer
- 2016: Jonathan Coe
- 2018: Andrea Moro
- 2019: Valeria Parrella

=== Super Flaiano of Literature ===
- 1991: John Banville
- 1992: José Saramago
- 1993: Luis Sepúlveda
- 1994: Giuseppe Pontiggia
- 1995: Daniele Del Giudice
- 1996: Abraham B. Yehoshua
- 1997: Carlo Sgorlon
- 1998: Andrea Camilleri
- 1999: Edwidge Danticat
- 2000: Javier Marías, Fabrizia Ramondino
- 2001: Roberto Pazzi
- 2002: Per Olov Enquist
- 2003: John Crowley
- 2004: Paolo Di Stefano
- 2005: Raffaele Nigro
- 2006: Raffaele La Capria
- 2008: Alice Munro
- 2009: Eraldo Affinati
- 2011: Sandro Veronesi

=== Poetry Prize ===
- 1986: Maria Luisa Spaziani
- 1987: Luciano Luisi
- 1988: Elio Filippo Accrocca
- 1989: Pietro Cimatti, Vivian Lamarque, Benito Sablone
- 1990: Edoardo Albinati, Dario Bellezza, Vico Faggi
- 1991: Renzo Barsacchi, Isabella Scalfaro, Massimo Scrignòli
- 1992: Marco Guzzi, Luciano Roncalli, Mario Trufelli
- 1993: Attilio Bertolucci, Cesare Vivaldi,
- 1994: Piero Bigongiari
- 1995: Seamus Heaney
- 1996: Yves Bonnefoy
- 1997: Miroslav Holub
- 1998: Lawrence Ferlinghetti
- 1999: Yang Lian
- 2000: Derek Walcott
- 2001: Charles Tomlinson
- 2002: Adunis

=== Italian Studies Prize ===
- 2002:
  - Daniela Amsallem,
  - Peter Kuon,
  - Eanna O’Ceallachain,
  - Joanna Ugniewska
- 2003:
  - Ginette Herry,
  - Mladen Machiedo,
  - Millicent Marcus,
  - Irmgard Scharold
- 2004:
  - Smaranda Bratu Elian,
  - Marcel Schneider,
  - Tibor Szabo,
  - Minoru Tanokura
- 2005:
  - Federica Brunori Deigan,
  - Gerard Marino,
  - Rita Marnoto
- 2006:
  - Larissa G. Stepanova,
  - Ariel Rathaus,
  - Lucia Re e Paul Vangelisti
- 2007:
  - Teodolinda Barolini,
  - Adel El Siwi,
  - Dagmar Reichardt
- 2008:
  - Michail Andreev,
  - Laura Benedetti,
  - Angela Barwig,
  - Thomas Stauder
- 2009:
  - Stefano Fogelberg Rota,
  - Margherita Heyer-Caput,
  - Thian Shigang
- 2010:
  - Yasuko Matsumoto,
  - Jozsef Pal,
  - Stanislao Pugliese
- 2011:
  - Marisa Trubiano,
  - Laura Lahdensuu,
  - Jiří Špička
- 2012:
  - Edward Goldberg,
  - Philip Cooke,
  - Alfred Noe
- 2013:
  - Konrad Eisenbichler,
  - Joseph Farrell,
  - Augustine Thompson
- 2014:
  - Geo Vasile,
  - Sania Roič,
  - Barbara Kornacka
- 2015:
  - Ole Meyer
- 2016:
  - Fernanda Elisa Bravo Herrera,
  - Armando Maggi,
  - Miriam Oravcov

=== Special Prize ===
- 1999:
  - Vittorio Emiliani
- 2001:
  - Imre Kertész
- 2005:
  - Wole Soyinka
- 2006:
  - Antonio Skármeta
- 2010 Special prizes
  - The centenary of the birth of Ennio Flaiano,
  - Roberto Saviano the high moral value and ethical commitment of his work,
  - Poet and film writer Tonino Guerra,
- 2012: Hussein Mahmoud (Special Italian Studies Award)
- 2013: Special prizes for the 40th
  - Adonis for poetry,
  - Jaroslaw Mikolaiewski for Italian Culture in the World,
  - Salvatore Settis
- 2022: Best Male Performance in the Youth Section
  - Phaim Bhuyian for Bangla - La serie
