= Viareggio Prize =

Italian literary award

The Viareggio Prize (Italian: Premio Viareggio or Premio Letterario Viareggio-Rèpaci) is an Italian literary prize, first awarded in 1930. Named after the Tuscan city of Viareggio, it was conceived by three friends, Alberto Colantuoni, Carlo Salsa and Leonida Repaci, to rival the Bagutta Prize awarded in Milan.

The Viareggio-Versilia International Prize is also awarded by the jury each year to a prominent figure whose work fosters dialogue among peoples, advances social progress, and promotes peace.

== List of recipients ==
The first (or some cases equal-first) prizes have been awarded as follows:

=== From 1930 to 1947 ===
Year	Recipient(s)	Ref(s)
1930	Anselmo Bucci, Il pittore volante	
1930	Lorenzo Viani, Ritorno alla patria	
1931	Corrado Tumiati, I tetti rossi	
1932	Antonino Foschini, L'avventura di Villon	
1933	Achille Campanile, Cantilena all'angolo della strada	
1934	Raffaele Calzini, Segantini, romanzo della montagna	
1935	Mario Massa, Un uomo solo	
1935	Stefano Landi, Il muro di casa	
1936	Riccardo Bacchelli, Il rabdomante	
1937	Guelfo Civinini, Trattoria di paese	
1938	Vittorio G. Rossi, Oceano (Oceano)	
1938	Enrico Pea, La Maremmana	
1939	Maria Bellonci, Lucrezia Borgia, la sua vita e i suoi tempi (The Life and Times of Lucrezia Borgia)	
1939	Arnaldo Frateili, Clara fra i lupi	
1939	Orio Vergani, Basso profondo ed altre fantasie	
1940	Not awarded	
1941	Not awarded	
1942	Not awarded	
1943	Not awarded	
1944	Not awarded	
1945	Not awarded	
1946	Umberto Saba, Il Canzoniere	
1946	Silvio Micheli, Pane duro	
1947	Antonio Gramsci, Lettere dal Carcere (Prison Notebooks)	

=== From 1948 to present ===
Year	Fiction	Poetry	Essay	First work	Special award(s)	Ref(s)
1948	Aldo Palazzeschi, I fratelli Cuccoli	Sibilla Aleramo, Selva d'amore	—			
1948	Elsa Morante, Menzogna e sortilegio (House of Liars)	Sibilla Aleramo, Selva d'amore	—			
1949	Arturo Carlo Jemolo, Stato e Chiesa in Italia negli ultimi cento anni (Church and State in Italy, 1850–1950)	Libero De Libero, Banchetto	—			
1949	Arturo Carlo Jemolo, Stato e Chiesa in Italia negli ultimi cento anni (Church and State in Italy, 1850–1950)	Renata Viganò, L'Agnese va a morire	—			
1950	Francesco Jovine, Le terre del Sacramento	Corrado Govoni (for his entire work)	Massimo Mila, L'esperienza musicale e l'estetica	Giorgio Piovano, Poema di noi	—	
1950	Carlo Bernari, Speranzella	Corrado Govoni (for his entire work)	Massimo Mila, L'esperienza musicale e l'estetica	Giorgio Piovano, Poema di noi	—	
1951	Domenico Rea, Gesù, fate luce	Attilio Bertolucci, La capanna indiana	Marcello Venturoli and Ruggero Zangrandi, Dizionario della paura	Pietro Sissa, La banda di Döhren		
1952	Tommaso Fiore, Un popolo di formiche: lettere pugliesi a Piero Gobetti	—		Marcello Venturi, Dalla Sirte a casa mia	Fiction Special Award: Anna Banti, Le donne muoiono	
1952	Tommaso Fiore, Un popolo di formiche: lettere pugliesi a Piero Gobetti	—		Marcello Venturi, Dalla Sirte a casa mia	Fiction Special Award: Giovanni Comisso, Capricci italiani	
1952	Tommaso Fiore, Un popolo di formiche: lettere pugliesi a Piero Gobetti	—		Marcello Venturi, Dalla Sirte a casa mia	"Community" Fiction Special Award: Mario Praz, La casa della fama. Saggi di letteratura e d'arte	
1952	Tommaso Fiore, Un popolo di formiche: lettere pugliesi a Piero Gobetti	—		Marcello Venturi, Dalla Sirte a casa mia	"Savinio" Poetry Award: Giorgio Caproni, Stanze della funicolare	
1953	Carlo Emilio Gadda, Novelle dal ducato in fiamme	Raffaele Carrieri, Il trovatore	Roberto Battaglia, Storia della Resistenza: 8 settembre 1943–24 aprile 1945	Mario Rigoni Stern, l sergente nella neve. Ricordi della ritirata di Russia (The Sergeant in the Snow)	Fiction Special Award: Anna Maria Ortese, Il mare non bagna Napoli (The Bay Is Not Naples)	
1954	Rocco Scotellaro, È fatto giorno (The Dawn Is Always New. Selected Poetry of Rocco Scotellaro)	—	Giuseppe Giarrizzo, Edward Gibbon e la cultura europea del Settecento	Giampiero Carocci, Il campo degli ufficiali (The Officers Camp)	Fiction Special Award: Giuseppe Raimondi, Notizie dall'Emilia	
1955	Vasco Pratolini, Metello (Metello. A Novel)	Carlo Betocchi, Poesie (1930–1954)	Eugenio Garin, Cronache di filosofia italiana. 1900–1943	Giovanni Russo, Baroni e contadini (Baroni e contadini. On Social Conditions in Southern Italy)	—	
1955	Vasco Pratolini, Metello (Metello. A Novel)	Carlo Betocchi, Poesie (1930–1954)	Giuseppe Ravegnani, Uomini visti. Figure e libri del Novecento (1914–1954)	Giovanni Russo, Baroni e contadini (Baroni e contadini. On Social Conditions in Southern Italy)	—	
1956	Carlo Levi, Le parole sono pietre. Tre giornate in Sicilia (Words Are Stones: Impressions of Sicily)	Giacomo Noventa, Versi e poesie	Nino Valeri Da Giolitti a Mussolini. Momenti della crisi del liberalismo	Niccolò Tucci, Il segreto	—	
1956	Gianna Manzini, La Sparviera	Giacomo Noventa, Versi e poesie	Giancarlo Vigorelli, Gronchi, battaglie d'oggi e di ieri	Niccolò Tucci, Il segreto	—	
1957	Italo Calvino, Il barone rampante (The Baron in the Trees)	Pier Paolo Pasolini, Le ceneri di Gramsci (The Ashes of Gramsci)	Marcello Venturoli, La Patria di marmo	Felice Del Vecchio, La chiesa di Canneto	—	
1957	Arturo Tofanelli, L'uomo d'oro	Sandro Penna, Poesie	Dino Del Bo, La volontà dello Stato	Maria Giacobbe, Diario di una maestrina	—	
1957	Natalia Ginzburg, Valentino (Valentino)	Alberto Mondadori, Quasi una vicenda	Danilo Dolci, Inchiesta a Palermo (Report from Palermo)	Angelo Magliano, La borghesia e la paura	—	
1958	Tommaso Landolfi, Ottavio di Saint Vincent	Salvatore Quasimodo, La terra impareggiabile (The Incomparable Land)	Ernesto De Martino, Morte e pianto rituale nel mondo antico	Giuseppe Marotta, Marotta ciak	Special Award: Anita Fazzini, Ritorno in pianura	
1958	Tommaso Landolfi, Ottavio di Saint Vincent	Salvatore Quasimodo, La terra impareggiabile (The Incomparable Land)	Ernesto De Martino, Morte e pianto rituale nel mondo antico	Giuseppe Marotta, Marotta ciak	Special Award for a Report: Giovanni Passeri, Il pane dei carcamano	
1959	Marino Moretti, Tutte le novelle	Giorgio Caproni, Il seme del piangere	Giorgio Levi Della Vida, Anedotti e svaghi arabi e non arabi	Michele Lacalamita, La civiltà contadina	Theater Essay Special Award: Eugenio Levi, Il comico carattere da Teofrasto a Pirandello	
1959	Marino Moretti, Tutte le novelle	Giorgio Caproni, Il seme del piangere	Giorgio Levi Della Vida, Anedotti e svaghi arabi e non arabi	Michele Lacalamita, La civiltà contadina	Poetry Special Award: Giuseppe Villaroel, La bellezza intravista: liriche	
1959	Marino Moretti, Tutte le novelle	Giorgio Caproni, Il seme del piangere	Giorgio Levi Della Vida, Anedotti e svaghi arabi e non arabi	Michele Lacalamita, La civiltà contadina	Special Award for a Journalistic Report: Giuseppe Boffa, La grande svolta (Inside the Khrushchev Era)	
1959	Marino Moretti, Tutte le novelle	Giorgio Caproni, Il seme del piangere	Giorgio Levi Della Vida, Anedotti e svaghi arabi e non arabi	Michele Lacalamita, La civiltà contadina	Foreign work: Will Grohmann, Wassili Kandinsky: la vita e l'opera (Wassily Kandinsky: Life and Work)	
1960	Laudomia Bonanni, L'imputata	Paolo Volponi, Le porte dell'Appennino	Ettore Lo Gatto, Puškin: storia di un poeta e del suo eroe	Sergio Saviane, Festa di laurea	Theater Special Award: Eduardo De Filippo, Cantata dei giorni pari	
1960	Laudomia Bonanni, L'imputata	Paolo Volponi, Le porte dell'Appennino	Ettore Lo Gatto, Puškin: storia di un poeta e del suo eroe	Sergio Saviane, Festa di laurea	Special Award for a Journalistic Report: Silvio Micheli, L'"Artiglio" ha confessato	
1960	Giovanni Battista Angioletti, I grandi ospiti	Paolo Volponi, Le porte dell'Appennino	Bruno Migliorini, Storia della lingua italiana (The Italian Language)	Sergio Saviane, Festa di laurea	8 September 1943 Armistice Special Award: Maria Chiappelli, Lettera incompiuta	
1960	Giovanni Battista Angioletti, I grandi ospiti	Paolo Volponi, Le porte dell'Appennino	Bruno Migliorini, Storia della lingua italiana (The Italian Language)	Sergio Saviane, Festa di laurea	8 September 1943 Armistice Special Award: Giuseppe D'Agata, L'esercito di Scipione	
1960	Giovanni Battista Angioletti, I grandi ospiti	Paolo Volponi, Le porte dell'Appennino	Bruno Migliorini, Storia della lingua italiana (The Italian Language)	Sergio Saviane, Festa di laurea	8 September 1943 Armistice Special Award: Elsa De Giorgi, I coetanei	
1961	Alberto Moravia, La noia (Boredom)	—		Lorenza Mazzetti, Il cielo cade (The Sky Falls)	—	
1962	Giorgio Bassani, Il giardino dei Finzi Contini (The Garden of the Finzi-Continis)	—	Carlo Ludovico Ragghianti, Mondrian e l'arte del XX secolo	Claudio Napoleoni, Il pensiero economico del Novecento (Economic Thought of the Twentieth Century)	—	
1962	Giorgio Bassani, Il giardino dei Finzi Contini (The Garden of the Finzi-Continis)	—	Carlo Ludovico Ragghianti, Mondrian e l'arte del XX secolo	Attilio Bertolucci, In cerca del mistero: poesie	—	
1963	Antonio Delfini, Racconti	—	Sergio Solmi, Scrittori negli anni. Saggi e note sulla letteratura Italiana del '900	Massimo Ferretti, Allergia, 1952–1962. Poesie	—	
1963	Antonio Delfini, Racconti	—	Sergio Solmi, Scrittori negli anni. Saggi e note sulla letteratura Italiana del '900	Enrico Castelnuovo, Un pittore italiano alla corte di Avignone. Matteo Giovannetti e la pittura in Provenza nel secolo XIV	—	
1964	Giuseppe Berto, Il male oscuro (Incubus)	—	Manara Valgimigli, Poeti e filosofi di Grecia	—		
1965	Goffredo Parise, Il padrone (The Boss)	—	Angelo Maria Ripellino, Il trucco e l'anima. I maestri della regia nel teatro russo del Novecento	—		
1966	Alfonso Gatto, La storia delle vittime	—	Ottiero Ottieri, L'irrealtà quotidiana	—		
1967	Raffaello Brignetti, Il gabbiano azzurro	Diego Valeri, Poesie	Santo Mazzarino, Il pensiero storico classico	Fiction: Alice Ceresa, La figlia prodiga	Aldo Capitini, La compresenza dei morti e dei viventi	
1967	Raffaello Brignetti, Il gabbiano azzurro	Diego Valeri, Poesie	Santo Mazzarino, Il pensiero storico classico	Essay: Lidia Storoni Mazzolani, L'idea di città nel mondo romano: l'evoluzione del pensiero politico di Roma (The Idea of the City in Roman Thought: from Walled City to Spiritual Commonwealth)	Aldo Capitini, La compresenza dei morti e dei viventi	
1968	Libero Bigiaretti, La controfigura (Note: The award was originally awarded to Italo Calvino for Ti con zero (t zero), but Calvino refused it.)	Giorgio Vigolo, La luce ricorda	Giuliano Procacci, Storia degli italiani (History of the Italian People)	Fiction: Giulio Cattaneo, L'uomo della novità	Franco Basaglia, L'istituzione negata. Rapporto da un ospedale psichiatrico	
1968	Libero Bigiaretti, La controfigura	Giorgio Vigolo, La luce ricorda	Giuliano Procacci, Storia degli italiani (History of the Italian People)	Essay: Sergio Pautasso, Elio Vittorini (Elio Vittorini)	Franco Basaglia, L'istituzione negata. Rapporto da un ospedale psichiatrico	
1969	Fulvio Tomizza, L'albero dei sogni	Giovanni Giudici, Autobiologia	Giovanni Getto, Barocco in prosa e in poesia	Fiction: Franco Cordero, Genus	Marino Moretti	
1969	Fulvio Tomizza, L'albero dei sogni	Giovanni Giudici, Autobiologia	Giovanni Getto, Barocco in prosa e in poesia	Fiction: Franco Cordero, Genus	Nicola Lisi	
1969	Fulvio Tomizza, L'albero dei sogni	Giovanni Giudici, Autobiologia	Giovanni Getto, Barocco in prosa e in poesia	Essay: Cesare Garboli, La stanza separata	Giulia Veronesi (for her entire work)	
1969	Fulvio Tomizza, L'albero dei sogni	Giovanni Giudici, Autobiologia	Giovanni Getto, Barocco in prosa e in poesia	Essay: Cesare Garboli, La stanza separata	Benedetto Marzullo	
1970	Nello Sàito, Dentro e fuori	Nelo Risi, Di certe cose che dette in versi suonano meglio che in prosa	Pietro Citati, Goethe (Goethe)	—		
1971	Ugo Attardi, L'erede selvaggio	Libero De Libero, Di brace in brace: 1956-1970	Nino Valeri, Giovanni Giolitti	Fiction: Lucio Ceva, Teskeré e altri racconti	Memorial Special Award: Giacomo Debenedetti and Arnoldo Mondadori	
1971	Ugo Attardi, L'erede selvaggio	Libero De Libero, Di brace in brace: 1956-1970	Nino Valeri, Giovanni Giolitti	Essay: Mario Lodi, Il paese sbagliato. Diario di un'esperienza didattica	Memorial Special Award: Giacomo Debenedetti and Arnoldo Mondadori	
1971	Ugo Attardi, L'erede selvaggio	Libero De Libero, Di brace in brace: 1956-1970	Nino Valeri, Giovanni Giolitti	Poetry: Giorgio Sbaraglia, Parola	Memorial Special Award: Giacomo Debenedetti and Arnoldo Mondadori	
1972	Romano Bilenchi, Il bottone di Stalingrado	Ignazio Buttitta, Io faccio il poeta	Lucio Lombardo-Radice, Gli accusati: Franz Kafka, Michaíl Bulgakov, Aleksandr Solženitsyn, Milan Kundera	Fiction: Francesca Sanvitale, Il cuore borghese	Award from the President: Giuseppe Marotta Jr, Si rilassi	
1972	Romano Bilenchi, Il bottone di Stalingrado	Ignazio Buttitta, Io faccio il poeta	Lucio Lombardo-Radice, Gli accusati: Franz Kafka, Michaíl Bulgakov, Aleksandr Solženitsyn, Milan Kundera	Fiction: Antonio Debenedetti, Monsieur Kitsch	Award from the President: Guido Sereni, Om ad Po	
1972	Romano Bilenchi, Il bottone di Stalingrado	Ignazio Buttitta, Io faccio il poeta	Lucio Lombardo-Radice, Gli accusati: Franz Kafka, Michaíl Bulgakov, Aleksandr Solženitsyn, Milan Kundera	Essay: Ernesto Ferrero, I gerghi della mala dal '400 a oggi	Award from the President: Nantas Salvalaggio, Malpaga	
1972	Romano Bilenchi, Il bottone di Stalingrado	Ignazio Buttitta, Io faccio il poeta	Lucio Lombardo-Radice, Gli accusati: Franz Kafka, Michaíl Bulgakov, Aleksandr Solženitsyn, Milan Kundera	Poetry: Corrado De Vita, Conoscenza di Stefano	Award from the President: Nantas Salvalaggio, Malpaga	
1973	Achille Campanile, Manuale di conversazione	Ferdinando Camon, Liberare l'animale	Mario Praz, Il patto col serpente. Paralipomeni di La carne, la morte e il diavolo nella letteratura romantica	Fiction: Pellegrino Sarno, La distanza delle cose	—	
1973	Achille Campanile, Manuale di conversazione	Ferdinando Camon, Liberare l'animale	Mario Praz, Il patto col serpente. Paralipomeni di La carne, la morte e il diavolo nella letteratura romantica	Poetry – First work: Giuseppe Livi, La cultura sommersa	—	
1974	Clotilde Marghieri, Amati enigmi	Rossana Ombres, Bestiario d'amore	Giorgio Amendola, Lettere a Milano. Ricordi e documenti, 1939–1945	Fiction: Rosetta Loy, La bicicletta	Award from the President: Biagio Marin, A sol calao	
1974	Clotilde Marghieri, Amati enigmi	Rossana Ombres, Bestiario d'amore	Giorgio Amendola, Lettere a Milano. Ricordi e documenti, 1939–1945	Essay: Luciano Bellosi, Buffalmacco e il trionfo della morte	Award from the President: Biagio Marin, A sol calao	
1974	Clotilde Marghieri, Amati enigmi	Rossana Ombres, Bestiario d'amore	Giorgio Amendola, Lettere a Milano. Ricordi e documenti, 1939–1945	Poetry: Rodolfo Carelli, Un posto nel profondo	Award from the President: Biagio Marin, A sol calao	
1975	Paolo Volponi, Il sipario ducale (Last Act in Urbino)	Leonardo Sinisgalli, Mosche in battaglia	Gianandrea Gavazzeni, Non eseguire Beethoven	Fiction: Gavino Ledda, Padre padrone. L'educazione di un pastore	Award from the President: Alfonso Leonetti, Da Andria contadina a Torino operaia. Un giovane socialista tra guerra e rivoluzione	
1975	Paolo Volponi, Il sipario ducale (Last Act in Urbino)	Leonardo Sinisgalli, Mosche in battaglia	Gianandrea Gavazzeni, Non eseguire Beethoven	Essay: Vittoria Ronchey, Figlioli miei, marxisti immaginari	Award from the President: Alfonso Leonetti, Da Andria contadina a Torino operaia. Un giovane socialista tra guerra e rivoluzione	
1975	Paolo Volponi, Il sipario ducale (Last Act in Urbino)	Leonardo Sinisgalli, Mosche in battaglia	Gianandrea Gavazzeni, Non eseguire Beethoven	Poetry: Giovanni Marini, E noi folli e giust	Memorial Special Award: Alberto Trebeschi, Lineamenti di storia del pensiero scientifico	
1976	Mario Tobino, La bella degli specchi	Dario Bellezza, Morte segreta	Essay: Sergio Solmi, La luna di Laforgue	Fiction: Luigi Podda, Dall'ergastolo	Award from the President: Umberto Terracini	
1976	Mario Tobino, La bella degli specchi	Dario Bellezza, Morte segreta	Essay: Sergio Solmi, La luna di Laforgue	Essay: Alberto Beretta Anguissola, Proust inattuale	Award from the President: Umberto Terracini	
1976	Mario Tobino, La bella degli specchi	Dario Bellezza, Morte segreta	Essay: Sergio Solmi, La luna di Laforgue	Poetry: Cosimo Fornaro, Pensieri sottovoce	Award from the President: Umberto Terracini	
1977	Davide Lajolo, Veder l'erba dalla parte delle radici	Tommaso Landolfi, Il tradimento	Cesare Brandi, Scritti sull'arte contemporanea	Fiction: Pietro Ghizzardi, Mi richordo anchora	Award from the President: Paolo Grassi, Quarant’anni di palcoscenico	
1977	Davide Lajolo, Veder l'erba dalla parte delle radici	Tommaso Landolfi, Il tradimento	Cesare Brandi, Scritti sull'arte contemporanea	Essay: Giuliana Morandini, E allora mi hanno rinchiusa. Testimonianze dal manicomio femminile	Award from the President: Paolo Grassi, Quarant’anni di palcoscenico	
1977	Davide Lajolo, Veder l'erba dalla parte delle radici	Tommaso Landolfi, Il tradimento	Cesare Brandi, Scritti sull'arte contemporanea	Poetry: Carlo Francavilla, Le terre della sete	Award from the President: Paolo Grassi, Quarant’anni di palcoscenico	
1978	Fiction: Antonio Altomonte, Dopo il presidente	Mario Luzi, Al fuoco della controversia	Ludovico Zorzi, Il teatro e la città. Saggi sulla scena italiana	Fiction: Mario Isotti, Amore mio nemico	Award from the President: Camilla Ravera, Breve storia del movimento femminile in Italia	
1978	Fiction: Antonio Altomonte, Dopo il presidente	Mario Luzi, Al fuoco della controversia	Ludovico Zorzi, Il teatro e la città. Saggi sulla scena italiana	Essay: Salvatore Settis, La "Tempesta" interpretata. Giorgione, i committenti, il soggetto (Giorgione's Tempest: Interpreting the Hidden Subject)	Award from the President: Camilla Ravera, Breve storia del movimento femminile in Italia	
1978	Fiction: Antonio Altomonte, Dopo il presidente	Mario Luzi, Al fuoco della controversia	Ludovico Zorzi, Il teatro e la città. Saggi sulla scena italiana	Poetry: Angelo Lumelli, Cosa bella cosa	Special Award: Giansiro Ferrata	
1979	Giorgio Manganelli, Centuria: cento piccoli romanzi fiume (Centuria: One Hundred Ouroboric Novels)	Andrea Zanzotto, Il galateo in bosco	Giuseppe Boffa, Storia dell'Unione Sovietica	Fiction: Giulio Del Tredici, Tarbagatai	Award from the President: Oriana Fallaci, Un uomo (A Man)	
1979	Giorgio Manganelli, Centuria: cento piccoli romanzi fiume (Centuria: One Hundred Ouroboric Novels)	Andrea Zanzotto, Il galateo in bosco	Giuseppe Boffa, Storia dell'Unione Sovietica	Essay: Maria Monetti, La meccanica delle passioni. Studio su Fourier e il socialismo critico-utopistico	Award from the President: Oriana Fallaci, Un uomo (A Man)	
1979	Giorgio Manganelli, Centuria: cento piccoli romanzi fiume (Centuria: One Hundred Ouroboric Novels)	Andrea Zanzotto, Il galateo in bosco	Giuseppe Boffa, Storia dell'Unione Sovietica	Poetry: Rosita Copioli, Splendida lumina solis (The Blazing Lights of the Sun)	Award from the President: Oriana Fallaci, Un uomo (A Man)	
1980	Stefano Terra, Le porte di ferro	Luciano Erba, Il mostro di Moebius	Elvio Fachinelli, La freccia ferma. Tre tentativi di annullare il tempo	Fiction – First work: Olivo Bin, Storia di un bocia	Award from the President: Leo Solari, Eugenio Colorni. Ieri e sempre	
1980	Stefano Terra, Le porte di ferro	Luciano Erba, Il mostro di Moebius	Elvio Fachinelli, La freccia ferma. Tre tentativi di annullare il tempo	Essay: Paolo Zellini, Breve storia dell'infinito (A Brief History of Infinity)	Award from the President: Leo Solari, Eugenio Colorni. Ieri e sempre	
1980	Stefano Terra, Le porte di ferro	Luciano Erba, Il mostro di Moebius	Elvio Fachinelli, La freccia ferma. Tre tentativi di annullare il tempo	Poetry: Cosimo Ortesta, Il bagno degli occhi	Award from the President: Leo Solari, Eugenio Colorni. Ieri e sempre	
1981	Enzo Siciliano, La principessa e l'antiquario	Maria Luisa Spaziani, Geometria del disordine	Gennaro Sasso, Niccolò Machiavelli	Fiction: Massimo Griffo, Futuro anteriore	Award from the President: Paolo Vittorelli, L'età della speranza. Testimonianze e ricordi del Partito d'azione	
1981	Enzo Siciliano, La principessa e l'antiquario	Maria Luisa Spaziani, Geometria del disordine	Gennaro Sasso, Niccolò Machiavelli	Essay: Guido Santato, Pier Paolo Pasolini. L'opera	Award from the President: Paolo Vittorelli, L'età della speranza. Testimonianze e ricordi del Partito d'azione	
1981	Enzo Siciliano, La principessa e l'antiquario	Maria Luisa Spaziani, Geometria del disordine	Gennaro Sasso, Niccolò Machiavelli	Poetry: Vivian Lamarque, Teresino	Award from the President: Paolo Vittorelli, L'età della speranza. Testimonianze e ricordi del Partito d'azione	
1982	Primo Levi, Se non ora, quando? (If Not Now, When?)	Vittorio Sereni, Stella variabile (Variable Star)	Luigi Lombardi Satriani and Mariano Meligrana, Il ponte di San Giacomo. L'ideologia della morte nella società contadina del sud	Fiction: Graziella Civiletti, Il ritratto della bella fortunata	Award from the President: Maria Fida Moro, La casa dei cento natali	
1982	Primo Levi, Se non ora, quando? (If Not Now, When?)	Vittorio Sereni, Stella variabile (Variable Star)	Luigi Lombardi Satriani and Mariano Meligrana, Il ponte di San Giacomo. L'ideologia della morte nella società contadina del sud	Essay: Massimo Bacigalupo, L'ultimo Pound	Award from the President: Maria Fida Moro, La casa dei cento natali	
1982	Primo Levi, Se non ora, quando? (If Not Now, When?)	Vittorio Sereni, Stella variabile (Variable Star)	Luigi Lombardi Satriani and Mariano Meligrana, Il ponte di San Giacomo. L'ideologia della morte nella società contadina del sud	Poetry: Patrizia Valduga, Medicamenta	Award from the President: Maria Fida Moro, La casa dei cento natali	
1983	Giuliana Morandini, Caffè specchi (The Café of Mirrors)	Maurizio Cucchi, Glenn	Gianfranco Folena, L'italiano in Europa. Esperienze linguistiche del Settecento	Fiction: Daniele Del Giudice, Lo stadio di Wimbledon	Award from the President: Emilio Guarnaschelli, Una piccola pietra	
1983	Giuliana Morandini, Caffè specchi (The Café of Mirrors)	Maurizio Cucchi, Glenn	Gianfranco Folena, L'italiano in Europa. Esperienze linguistiche del Settecento	Essay: Benedetta Craveri, Madame Du Deffand e il suo mondo (Madame du Deffand and Her World)	Special Award: Luca Canali, Autobiografia di un baro	
1984	Gina Lagorio, Tosca dei gatti (Tosca, the Cat Lady)	Antonio Porta, Invasioni (1980–1983)	Bruno Gentili, Poesia e pubblico nella Grecia antica. Da Omero al V secolo (Poetry and Its Public in Ancient Greece: From Homer to the Fifth Century)	Fiction: Maria Pace Ottieri, Amore nero	Award from the President: Leo Valiani, Tutte le strade conducono a Roma	
1984	Gina Lagorio, Tosca dei gatti (Tosca, the Cat Lady)	Antonio Porta, Invasioni (1980–1983)	Bruno Gentili, Poesia e pubblico nella Grecia antica. Da Omero al V secolo (Poetry and Its Public in Ancient Greece: From Homer to the Fifth Century)	Essay: Claudio Pozzoli, Vita di Martin Lutero	Award from the President: Leo Valiani, Tutte le strade conducono a Roma	
1984	Gina Lagorio, Tosca dei gatti (Tosca, the Cat Lady)	Antonio Porta, Invasioni (1980–1983)	Bruno Gentili, Poesia e pubblico nella Grecia antica. Da Omero al V secolo (Poetry and Its Public in Ancient Greece: From Homer to the Fifth Century)	Poetry: Pier Mario Fasanotti, Labbra d'arancia	Special Award: Primo Conti, La gola del merlo. Memoria provocate da Gabriel Cacho Millet	
1985	Marisa Volpi, Il maestro della betulla	Mario Socrate, Il punto di vista	Giorgio Candeloro, Storia dell'Italia moderna	—	Special Award: Agostino Richelmy, La lettrice di Isasca	
1986	Marisa Volpi, Il maestro della betulla	Mario Socrate, Il punto di vista	Giorgio Candeloro, Storia dell'Italia moderna	—	Special Award: Agostino Richelmy, La lettrice di Isasca	
1987	Mario Spinella, Lettera da Kupjansk	Valerio Magrelli, Nature e venature	Nino Pirrotta, Scelte poetiche di musicisti. Teatro, poesia e musica da Willaert a Malipiero	—		
1988	Rosetta Loy, Le strade di polvere (The Dust Roads of Monferrato)	Raffaello Baldini, Furistír	Gianfranco Contini, Ultimi esercizî ed elzeviri (1968–1987)	—		
1989	Salvatore Mannuzzu, Procedura	Attilio Bertolucci, La camera da letto	Carlo Dionisotti, Appunti sui moderni. Foscolo, Leopardi, Manzoni e altri	—		
1990	Luisa Adorno, Arco di luminara	Cesare Viviani, Preghiera del nome	Maurizio Calvesi, Le realtà del Caravaggio	—		
1991	Antonio Debenedetti, Se la vita non è vita	Gabriella Leto, Nostalgia dell'acqua	Grazia Livi, Le lettere del mio nome	—		
1992	Luigi Malerba, Le pietre volanti	Franco Marcoaldi, A mosca cieca	Paolo Rossi Monti, Il passato, la memoria, l'oblio. Sei saggi di storia delle idee	—		
1993	Alessandro Baricco, Oceano mare (Ocean Sea)	Pier Luigi Bacchini, Visi e foglie	Antonio Gambino, Il mito della politica	—		
1994	Antonio Tabucchi, Sostiene Pereira (Pereira Maintains)	Giovanni Raboni, Ogni terzo pensiero	Chiara Frugoni, Francesco e l'invenzione delle stimmate	—		
1995	Maurizio Maggiani, Il coraggio del pettirosso	Elio Pagliarani, La ballata di Rudi	Serena Vitale, Il bottone di Puškin (Pushkin's Button)	—		
1996	Ermanno Rea, Mistero napoletano. Vita e passione di una comunista negli anni della guerra fredda (A Mystery in Naples)	Alda Merini, Ballate non pagate (Unpaid Ballads)	Giovanni Pozzi, Alternatim	—	Vittorio Foa, Questo Novecento	
1997	Claudio Piersanti, Luisa e il silenzio (Luisa and the Silence)	Franca Grisoni, De chí, de qui. Poesie della penisola di Sirmione	Corrado Stajano, Promemoria. Uno straniero in patria tra Campo de' Fiori e Palazzo Madama	—		
1998	Giorgio Pressburger, La neve e la colpa (Snow and Guilt)	Michele Sovente, Cumae	Carlo Ginzburg, Occhiacci di legno. Nove riflessioni sulla distanza (Wooden Eyes: Nine Reflections on Distance)	—		
1999	Ernesto Franco, Vite senza fine	Patrizia Cavalli, Teatro sempre aperto	Alessandro Portelli, L'ordine è già stato eseguito. Roma, le Fosse Ardeatine, la memoria (The Order Has Been Carried Out: History, Memory, and Meaning of a Nazi Massacre in Rome)	—		
2000	Giorgio van Straten, l mio nome a memoria (My Name, a Living Memory)	Tiziano Rossi, Gente di corsa (People on the Run)	Mimmo Franzinelli, I tentacoli dell'OVRA. Agenti, collaboratori e vittime della polizia politica fascista	—		
2000	Sandro Veronesi, La forza del passato (The Force of the Past: a Novel)	Tiziano Rossi, Gente di corsa (People on the Run)	Mimmo Franzinelli, I tentacoli dell'OVRA. Agenti, collaboratori e vittime della polizia politica fascista	—		
2001	Niccolò Ammaniti, Io non ho paura (I'm Not Scared)	Michele Ranchetti, Verbale	Giorgio Pestelli, Canti del destino. Studi su Brahms	—	Roberto Calasso, La letteratura e gli dei (Literature and the Gods)	
2002	Fleur Jaeggy, Proletarka (S.S. Proleterka)	Jolanda Insana, La stortura	Alfonso Berardinelli, La forma del saggio	—	Award from the President: Lina Bolzoni, La rete delle immagini. Predicazione in volgare dalle origini a Bernardino da Siena (Web of Images: Vernacular Preaching from Its Origins to Saint Bernardino of Siena)	
2002	Fleur Jaeggy, Proletarka (S.S. Proleterka)	Ludovica Ripa di Meana, Kouros: tragedia	Alfonso Berardinelli, La forma del saggio	—	Special Award: Barbara Spinelli, Il sonno della memoria	
2003	Giuseppe Montesano, Di questa vita menzognera	Roberto Amato, Le cucine celesti	Salvatore Settis, Italia S.p.A. L'assalto al patrimonio culturale	Gilberto Sacerdoti, Sacrificio e sovranità	—	
2004	Edoardo Albinati, Svenimenti	Livia Livi, Antifona	Andrea Tagliapietra, La virtú crudele. Filosofia e storia della sincerità	—		
2004	Edoardo Albinati, Svenimenti	Maria Marchesi, L'occhio dell'ala	Andrea Tagliapietra, La virtú crudele. Filosofia e storia della sincerità	—		
2005	Raffaele La Capria, L'estro quotidiano	Milo de Angelis, Tema dell'addio	Alberto Arbasino, Marescialle e libertini	Alessandro Piperno, Con le peggiori intenzioni (The Worst Intentions)		
2006	Gianni Celati, Vite di pascolanti. Tre racconti	Giuseppe Conte, Ferite e rifioriture	Giovanni Agosti, Su Mantegna. 1.: La storia dell'arte libera la testa	Roberto Saviano, Gomorra (Gomorrah)	—	
2007	Filippo Tuena, Ultimo parallelo	Silvia Bre, Marmo	Paolo Mauri, Buio	—		
2008	Francesca Sanvitale, L'inizio è in autunno	Eugenio De Signoribus, Poesie (1976–2007)	Miguel Gotor, Aldo Moro. Lettere dalla prigionia	—		
2009	Edith Bruck, Quanta stella c'è nel cielo	Ennio Cavalli, Libro grosso	Adriano Prosperi, Giustizia bendata	—		
2010	Nicola Lagioia, Riportando tutto a casa	Pierluigi Cappello, Mandate a dire all'imperatore	Michele Emmer, Bolle di sapone. Tra arte e matematica	—	Award from the President: Fernando Bandini, Quattordici poesie	
2011	Alessandro Mari, Troppa umana speranza	Gian Mario Villalta, Vanità della mente	Mario Lavagetto, Quel Marcel!	—		
2012	Nicola Gardini, Le parole perdute di Amelia Lynd	Antonella Anedda, Salva con nome	Franco Lo Piparo, I due carceri di Gramsci	—		
2013	Paolo Di Stefano, Giallo d’Avola	Enrico Testa, Ablativo	Giulio Guidorizzi, Il compagno dell’anima. I greci e il sogno	—		
2014	Francesco Pecoraro, La vita in tempo di pace	Luciano Mecacci, La ghirlanda fiorentina	Alessandro Fo, Mancanze	—		
2015	Antonio Scurati, Il tempo migliore della nostra vita	Franco Buffoni, Jucci	Massimo Bucciantini, Campo dei Fiori. Storia di un monumento maledetto	—		
2016	Franco Cordelli, Una stanza sottile	Sonia Gentili, Viaggio mentre morivo	Bruno Pischedda, L'idioma molesto	—		
2017	Gianfranco Calligarich, La malinconia dei Crusich	Stefano Carrai, La traversata del Gobi	Giuseppe Montesano, Lettori selvaggi	—		
2018	Fabio Genovesi, Il mare dove non si tocca	Roberta Dapunt, Sincope	Guido Melis, La macchina imperfetta. Immagine e realtà dello Stato fascista	Simone Somekh, Grandangolo	—	
2018	Giuseppe Lupo, Gli anni del nostro incanto	Roberta Dapunt, Sincope	Guido Melis, La macchina imperfetta. Immagine e realtà dello Stato fascista	Simone Somekh, Grandangolo	—	
2019	Emanuele Trevi, Sogni e favole	Renato Minore, O caro pensiero	Saverio Ricci, Campanella. Apocalisse e governo universale	Giovanna Cristina Vivinetto, Dolore minimo	Eugenio Scalfari	
2019	Emanuele Trevi, Sogni e favole	Renato Minore, O caro pensiero	Saverio Ricci, Campanella. Apocalisse e governo universale	Giovanna Cristina Vivinetto, Dolore minimo	Sabino Cassese	
2019	Emanuele Trevi, Sogni e favole	Renato Minore, O caro pensiero	Saverio Ricci, Campanella. Apocalisse e governo universale	Giovanna Cristina Vivinetto, Dolore minimo	Marco Bellocchio	
2019	Emanuele Trevi, Sogni e favole	Renato Minore, O caro pensiero	Saverio Ricci, Campanella. Apocalisse e governo universale	Giovanna Cristina Vivinetto, Dolore minimo	Riccardo Muti	
2019	Emanuele Trevi, Sogni e favole	Renato Minore, O caro pensiero	Saverio Ricci, Campanella. Apocalisse e governo universale	Giovanna Cristina Vivinetto, Dolore minimo	Gino Paoli	
2020	Paolo Di Paolo, Lontano dagli occhi	Luciano Cecchinel, Da sponda a sponda	Giulio Ferroni, L'Italia di Dante. Viaggio nel Paese della «Commedia»	Alberto Albertini, La classe avversa	Franco Gabrielli	
2020	Paolo Di Paolo, Lontano dagli occhi	Luciano Cecchinel, Da sponda a sponda	Giulio Ferroni, L'Italia di Dante. Viaggio nel Paese della «Commedia»	Alberto Albertini, La classe avversa	Natalia Aspesi	
2020	Paolo Di Paolo, Lontano dagli occhi	Luciano Cecchinel, Da sponda a sponda	Giulio Ferroni, L'Italia di Dante. Viaggio nel Paese della «Commedia»	Alberto Albertini, La classe avversa	Massimo Bray	
2020	Paolo Di Paolo, Lontano dagli occhi	Luciano Cecchinel, Da sponda a sponda	Giulio Ferroni, L'Italia di Dante. Viaggio nel Paese della «Commedia»	Alberto Albertini, La classe avversa	Ilaria Capua	
2020	Paolo Di Paolo, Lontano dagli occhi	Luciano Cecchinel, Da sponda a sponda	Giulio Ferroni, L'Italia di Dante. Viaggio nel Paese della «Commedia»	Alberto Albertini, La classe avversa	Sandro Luporini	
2020	Paolo Di Paolo, Lontano dagli occhi	Luciano Cecchinel, Da sponda a sponda	Giulio Ferroni, L'Italia di Dante. Viaggio nel Paese della «Commedia»	Alberto Albertini, La classe avversa	Dacia Maraini	
2020	Paolo Di Paolo, Lontano dagli occhi	Luciano Cecchinel, Da sponda a sponda	Giulio Ferroni, L'Italia di Dante. Viaggio nel Paese della «Commedia»	Alberto Albertini, La classe avversa	Maurizio Serra	
2021	Edith Bruck, Il pane perduto	Flavio Santi, Quanti (Truciolature, scie, onde, 1999–2019)	Walter Siti, Contro l'impegno	Alessandra Carati, E poi saremo salvi	Roberto Benigni	
2021	Edith Bruck, Il pane perduto	Flavio Santi, Quanti (Truciolature, scie, onde, 1999–2019)	Walter Siti, Contro l'impegno	Alessandra Carati, E poi saremo salvi	Annalena Benini	
2021	Edith Bruck, Il pane perduto	Flavio Santi, Quanti (Truciolature, scie, onde, 1999–2019)	Walter Siti, Contro l'impegno	Alessandra Carati, E poi saremo salvi	Igiaba Scego	
2022	Veronica Raimo, Niente di vero	Claudio Damiani, Prima di nascere	Silvia Ronchey, L'ultima immagine	Pietro Castellitto, Gli iperborei	International Award: Wlodek Goldkorn	
2022	Veronica Raimo, Niente di vero	Claudio Damiani, Prima di nascere	Silvia Ronchey, L'ultima immagine	Pietro Castellitto, Gli iperborei	Journalistic Award: Silvia Sciorilli Borrelli	
2022	Veronica Raimo, Niente di vero	Claudio Damiani, Prima di nascere	Silvia Ronchey, L'ultima immagine	Pietro Castellitto, Gli iperborei	Special Mention: Agnese Pini	
2023	Niccolò Ammaniti, La vita intima	Vivian Lamarque, L'amore da vecchia	Francesco Piccolo, La bella confusione	Pietro Santetti, Uomini di cavalli	International Award: Gian Arturo Ferrari	
2023	Niccolò Ammaniti, La vita intima	Vivian Lamarque, L'amore da vecchia	Francesco Piccolo, La bella confusione	Pietro Santetti, Uomini di cavalli	Journalistic Award: Nona Mikhelidze	
2023	Niccolò Ammaniti, La vita intima	Vivian Lamarque, L'amore da vecchia	Francesco Piccolo, La bella confusione	Pietro Santetti, Uomini di cavalli	Città di Viareggio Award: Stefano Massini	
2023	Niccolò Ammaniti, La vita intima	Vivian Lamarque, L'amore da vecchia	Francesco Piccolo, La bella confusione	Pietro Santetti, Uomini di cavalli	Tobino Award: Giampaolo Simi	

== Bibliography ==
- (in Italian) Chimirri, Costanza (2013), Tre amici tra la Sardegna e Ferrara: Le lettere di Mario Pinna a Giuseppe Dessí e Claudio Varese (in Italian), Firenze University Press, ISBN 9781135455293.
- (in Italian) Marrone, Gaetana; Puppa, Paolo (2006), Encyclopedia of Italian Literary Studies (in Italian), Routledge, ISBN 9781135455293.
- (in Italian) Salerno, Santino (2003), A Leonida Repaci. Dediche dal '900 (in Italian), Rubbettino Editore, ISBN 9788849806243.
