= Mecacci =

Mecacci is a surname. Notable people with the surname include:

- Luciano Mecacci (born 1946), Italian psychologist and author
- Matteo Mecacci (born 1975), Italian diplomat
