= Dionisotti =

Dionisotti is an Italian surname. Notable people with the surname include:

- Carlo Dionisotti (1908–1998), Italian literary critic, philologist, and essayist
- Paola Dionisotti (born 1946), Italian-British actress
