= Vivian Lamarque =

Italian poet, writer and translator

- Born: April 19, 1946 (age 80); Tesero, Italy

Vivian Lamarque (born April 19, 1946, near Trento) is an Italian poet, writer and translator. For most of her life she lived in the Milan area where she held a job as a school teacher.

In 1981, she received the Viareggio Prize for her work, Tesserino.

== Poetry ==
- Teresino, Milano, Società di poesia, 1981.
- Il Signore d'oro, Milano, Crocetti, 1986.
- Poesie dando del Lei, Milano, Garzanti, 1989. ISBN 88-11-63920-4
- Il libro delle ninne nanne, illustrazioni di Aura Cesari, Cinisello Balsamo, Edizioni Paoline, 1989. ISBN 88-21-51832-9.
- Il signore degli spaventati, Forte dei Marmi, Pegaso, 1992.
- Una quieta polvere, Milano, A. Mondadori, 1996.
- Poesie. 1972–2002, Milano, Oscar Mondadori, 2002.
- Poesie di ghiaccio, San Dorligo della Valle, Einaudi Ragazzi, 2004.
- Poesie per un gatto, Milano, A. Mondadori, 2007.
- Poesie della notte, Milano, Rizzoli Editore, 2009. ISBN 9788817033893
- La gentilèssa. Poesie in dialetto milanese, Brunello, Stampa, 2009.
- Madre d'inverno, Milano, Mondadori, 2016. ISBN 978-88-04-66219-8. Nuova ed. Milano, Mondadori, 2024.
- Una poesia, con un acquerello di Raffaello Margheri, I Marenghi n. 7, Officina del giorno dopo, Monte Sant'Angelo, 2022.
- L'amore da vecchia, Milano, Mondadori, 2022.
