= Calzini =

Calzini is an Italian surname. Notable people with the surname include:

- Brian Calzini (born 1985), American metalcore vocalist
- Raffaele Calzini (1885–1953), Italian art critic and writer

== See also ==
- Caldini
