= Claudio Damiani =

Italian poet (born 1957)

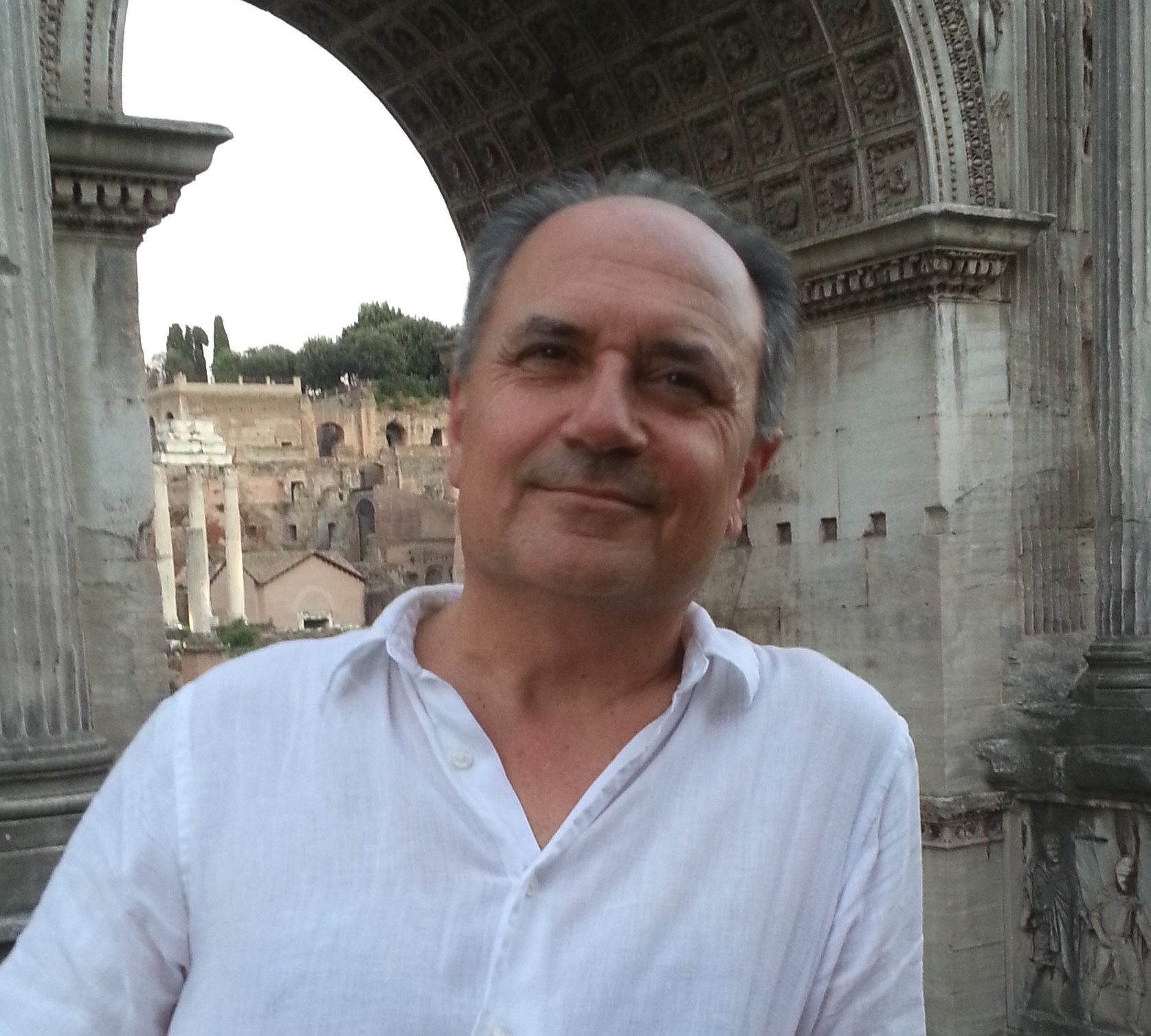
Claudio Damiani in 2018

Claudio Damiani is an Italian poet. He was born in San Giovanni Rotondo in the south of Italy (Puglia) in 1957 though at an early age, he moved to Rome where he still lives. He made his debut in 1978 in Nuovi Argomenti, the magazine directed by Pasolini, Moravia and Bertolucci. In the first half of the 1980s, he was among the founders of the magazine Braci, where a new classicism was proposed. Inspired by ancient Latin poets and by the Italian Renaissance, his themes are mainly nature and cosmos, with a side attention to current scientific research. "If the Horatian scenes of Sabina refer to a type of modern Arcadia, their specific quality is above all to approach a voice that is internal and literally poetic, refounded and reguarded like an unexpected and precious gift" (Roberto Galaverni, Contemporary Italian Poets, Modern Poetry in translation no. 15, 1999). His poems have been interpreted by such actors as Nanni Moretti and Piera Degli Esposti. Main prizes and awards: Premio Viareggio, Premio Carducci, Premio Montale, Premio Luzi, Premio Lerici, Premio Volterra, Premio Laurentum, Premio Brancati, Premio Frascati, Premio Alpi Apuane, Premio Camaiore.

== Poetry ==
- Fraturno (Abete, 1987)
- La mia casa (Pegaso, 1994)
- La miniera (Fazi, 1997)
- Eroi (Fazi, 2000)
- Attorno al fuoco (Avagliano, 2006)
- Sognando Li Po (Marietti, 2008)
- Poesie (anthology 1984-2010 edited by Marco Lodoli, Fazi, 2010)
- Il fico sulla fortezza (Fazi, 2012)
- Ode al monte Soratte (Fuorilinea, 2015)
- Cieli celesti (Fazi, 2016)
- La vita comune. Poesie e commenti (with Arnaldo Colasanti) (Melville, 2018)
- Endimione (Interno Poesia, 2019)
- Prima di nascere (Fazi, 2022)(Viareggio Prize)
- Postomeriche (Amos Edizioni, 2024)
- Rinascita (Fazi, 2025)

== Theatrical texts ==
- Il Rapimento di Proserpina, in Prato Pagano, nn. 4-5, Il Melograno, 1987
- Ninfale, Lepisma, 2013

== Essays ==
- Orazio, Arte poetica, con interventi di autori contemporanei (Fazi, 1995)
- Le più belle poesie di Trilussa (Mondadori, 2000)
- La difficile facilità. Appunti per un laboratorio di poesia (Lantana Editore, 2016)
- L'era nuova. Pascoli e i poeti di oggi, with Andrea Gareffi, (Liber Aria Edizioni, 2017)

== Bibliography in English ==
- Franco Buffoni, Italian Contemporary Poets, Fuis, 2016
- New Italian Poetry, An Anthology, Edited by A. Moscè, Gradiva Publications, Stony Brook, New York, 2006, Tr. Emanuel di Pasquale, pp. 204–209
- Journal of Italian Translation, Vol. I, No. 2, 2006, Editor L. Bonaffini, Tr. Luigi Fontanella, pp. 168–169
- Modern Poetry in Translation No. 15, Contemporary Italian Poets, King’s College London, 1999, Tr. John Satriano, pp. 31–34
