= Brignetti =

Brignetti is an Italian surname. Notable people with the surname include:

- Duilio Brignetti (1926–1993), Italian modern pentathlete
- Raffaello Brignetti (1921–1978), Italian writer
