= Giuseppe D'Agata =

Italian writer and screenwriter

- Born: 11 January 1927; Bologna, Italy
- Died: 29 March 2011 (aged 84); Bologna, Italy
- Occupation: Writer

Giuseppe D'Agata (11 January 1927 – 29 March 2011) was an Italian author, screenwriter and television writer.

== Biography ==
D'Agata was the son of a Molise couple from Guglionesi (Campobasso) who moved to Bologna, where his father was a printer, at the age of fifteen, thanks to two books won by his father in a local lottery, one of which was Elio Vittorini's Conversazione in Sicilia, he discovered that there was a contemporary literature beyond the authors of the scholastic canon, such as D'Annunzio, Giosuè Carducci and Giovanni Pascoli. In 1943 he obtained a diploma as a commercial computist and the following year, at the age of seventeen, joined the Matteotti SAP partisan brigade, joining the Socialist Party (then Italian Socialist Party). After the war he resumed his studies: he studied music and played as a ,rummer in an orchestra at a student club, an activity he practiced professionally for two years. In 1947 he wrote his first short stories, Elio Vittorini, which he considered experiments not worthy of publication. He also had a brief experience, in 1949, as a painter in the Metaphysical painting style.

In 1952 he founded, with other young Bolognese, the Literary magazine Stile; in 1953 he sent one of his new novels to Elio Vittorini, but he rejected the proposed changes, leaving it unpublished. He graduated from medical school in 1955 and began practicing medicine. He continued to write, and his short story "The Treasure of St. Adam"' won the Luigi Russo Pozzale Prize. The short novel Bix and Bessie, a story of young people discovering antifascism through jazz music, was sent to Romano Bilenchi for publication in a Sansoni series that never saw the light of day. In 1958 he began writing the novel The Army of Scipio, which, published two years later by the publisher Galileo of Bologna, won a minor prize at the Viareggio Prize. A year later, in 1961, it was the turn of The OTES Circle, a "narrative device," a metaliterary experiment that preceded the Neoavanguardia works but was not accepted by publishers.

D'Agata kept a figurative art criticism column in a daily newspaper. In 1963 he began work as a scriptwriter for Radio Rai, adapting various short stories, producing a six-part version of The Leopard, and writing two original radio dramas, Un conto da saldare and Il venditore C/E 402, which was also broadcast on foreign radio stations. In 1964 he published Il medico della mutua for Feltrinelli, a satirical novel about the medical profession that was a resounding success and aroused heated controversy. In the same year he left freelancing and became a municipal school doctor in Bologna. A year later he won the XX Prize for Resistance with the unpublished novel Bix and Bessie, renamed The Silver Cornet. In 1966 The OTES Circle was published by Feltrinelli. In 1967 he left medicine and moved to Rome to better pursue his interests in radio, television and film entertainment; two years later he was elected secretary of the National Writers' Union, of which he was later president for 20 years.

In 1971 D'Agata published at Bompiani Primo il corpo, a metaphor about art and science starring Leonardo da Vinci and François Villon. RAI aired the screenplay Il segno del comando, written by D'Agata with Flaminio Bollini, which was a huge success. A year later, the weekly magazine Aut serialized a political fiction novel in the form of a report by an American journalist following the events of a hypothetical coup in Italy. This novel was later published by Bompiani in 1973 under the title Quattro impiccati in Piazza del Popolo. In 1976 it was the turn of The Doctor, a novel about a planned assassination attempt against Benito Mussolini in 1940. In 2010 he began devising a project in collaboration with a small radio station in Bologna with author Marco Diaz. Unfortunately, the work came to an abrupt halt as the disease worsened.

== Life and career ==
Born in Bologna, the son of a typographer, at 17 years old D'Agata became a militant in the partisan brigade "Matteotti Sap" and then in 1944 he enrolled the Socialist Party and later the Italian Socialist Party of Proletarian Unity. He wrote several novels based on his own experiences as a partisan, and some of his novels such as L' esercito di Scipione and Il medico della mutua were adapted into films. He was also active as a screenwriter and a television writer, often collaborating with Andrea Camilleri. His last work was the novel Pippo per gli amici, released in 2007.
