= Jolanda Insana =

Italian poet and translator

- Born: 18 May 1937; Messina, Italy
- Died: 27 October 2016 (aged 79); Rome, Italy

Jolanda Insana (18 May 1937 – 27 October 2016) was an Italian poet and translator.

Born in Messina, in 1968 Insana moved to Rome where she graduated in Ancient Literature with a thesis on Erinna's The Distaff. Active as a translator of classical and contemporary authors, she debuted as a poet in 1977, with the collection Sciarra amara ("Bitter Harvest"). In 2002 she won the Viareggio Prize for poetry for La stortura.

Giovanni Raboni described Insana's poetic style as "visionary concreteness".

The first full-length collection of Insana’s poetry in English was translated by Catherine Theis and published by the University of Chicago Press in October 2024 as Slashing Sounds (Fendenti fonici; Società di poesia, Milan, 1982).
