= Grazia Livi =

Italian author and journalist

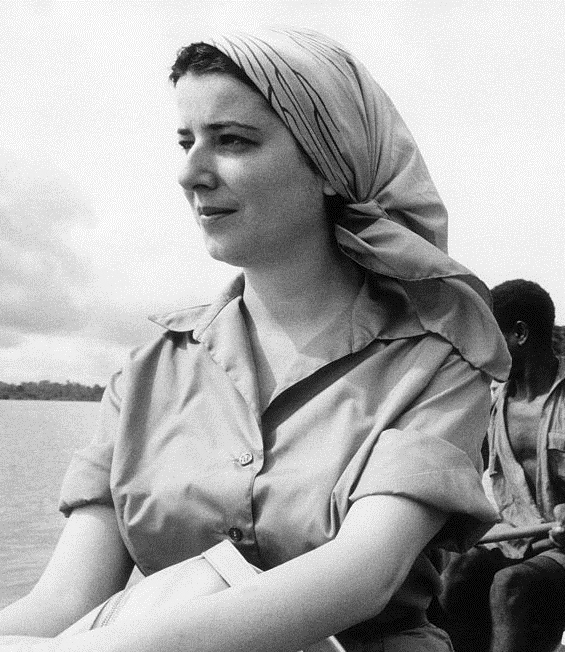
Grazia Livi in Africa in 1961

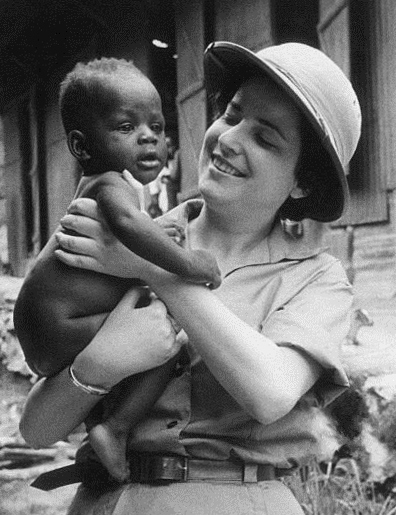
Grazia Livi in Africa in 1961

Grazia Livi (19 March 1930 – 18 January 2015) was an Italian author and journalist.

== Career ==
Born in Florence, Livi got a degree in Romance studies with Gianfranco Contini, then in 1958 she wrote her first novel, Gli scapoli di Londra (The London Bachelors).

In the sixties she started her career as a journalist working for several newspapers and magazines, notably La Nazione, Epoca and L'Europeo.

She decided to leave journalism to devote herself to writing, as a novelist and an essayist. In 1991 she won the Essays Section of the Viareggio Prize with the book Le lettere del mio nome ("The letters of my name"), while in 1994 she was a finalist at the Strega Prize with Vincoli segreti ("Secret Constraints"), a collection of short stories .
