= Vittorio G. Rossi =

Italian journalist and writer

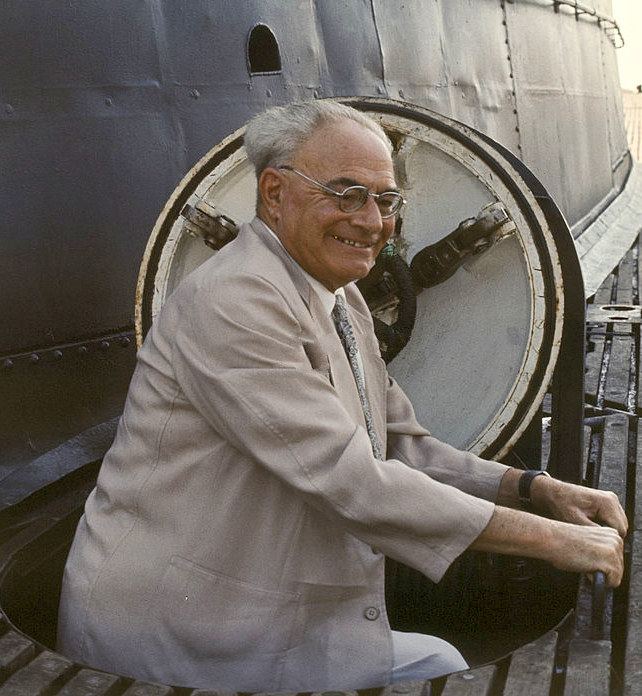
Vittorio Giovanni Rossi visiting the submarine Evangelista Torricelli (S-512) in 1965

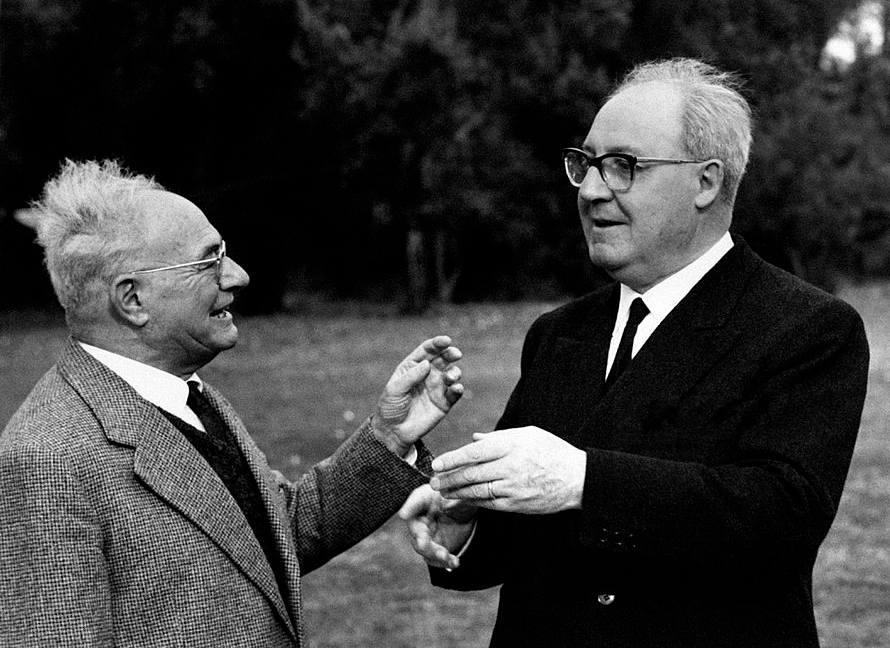
Vittorio Giovanni Rossi (left) with President Giuseppe Saragat in 1965

Vittorio Giovanni Rossi (8 January 1898 – 4 January 1978) was an Italian journalist and writer.

Rossi was born in Santa Margherita Ligure, Italy. He died in Rome and is buried in the S. Margherita Ligure cemetery, where is also his dedicated museum, inside the beautiful Villa Durazzo.

He was a special correspondent of the Italian newspaper Corriere della Sera and Epoca magazine. In his life, he has been also a shipmaster and officer, sailor and steersman, a deep-sea diver and fisherman, caravaneer and miner.

== Bibliography ==
=== Fiction ===
- Le streghe di mare, Alpes 1930, reprint Il Castello 2003, ISBN 88-8039-314-6
- Tassoni, Alpes 1931
- Tropici, Bompiani 1934
- Via degli spagnoli, Bompiani 1936
- Oceano, Bompiani 1938, repr. De Ferrari & Devega 2001, ISBN 88-7172-341-4
- Sabbia, Bompiani 1940
- La guerra dei marinai, Bompiani 1941
- Cobra, Bompiani 1941
- Pelle d'uomo, Bompiani 1943
- Alga, Bompiani 1945
- Preludio alla notte, Bompiani 1948
- Soviet, Garzanti 1952
- Fauna, Bompiani 1953
- Il granchio gioca col mare, Mondadori 1957
- Cristina e lo Spirito Santo, Mondadori 1958
- Festa delle lanterne, Mondadori 1960
- La Terra è un'arancia dolce, Mondadori 1961
- Nudi o vestiti, Mondadori 1963
- Miserere coi fichi, Mondadori 1963
- Il silenzio di Cassiopea, Mondadori 1965
- Però il mare è ancora quello, Mondadori 1966
- Teschio e tibie, Mondadori 1968
- L'orso sogna le pere, Mondadori 1971
- Calme di luglio, Mondadori 1973
- Il cane abbaia alla luna, Mondadori 1975
- Maestrale, Mondadori 1976
- Terra e acqua, Mursia 1988, ISBN 88-425-0306-1

== Acknowledgments ==
- Viareggio Prize, 1938, "Oceano"

== Books on Vittorio G. Rossi ==
- Vittorio G. Rossi, Alberto Frasson, Edizioni del Noce 1983, ISBN 88-86115-16-4
