= Roberta Dapunt =

Italian poet

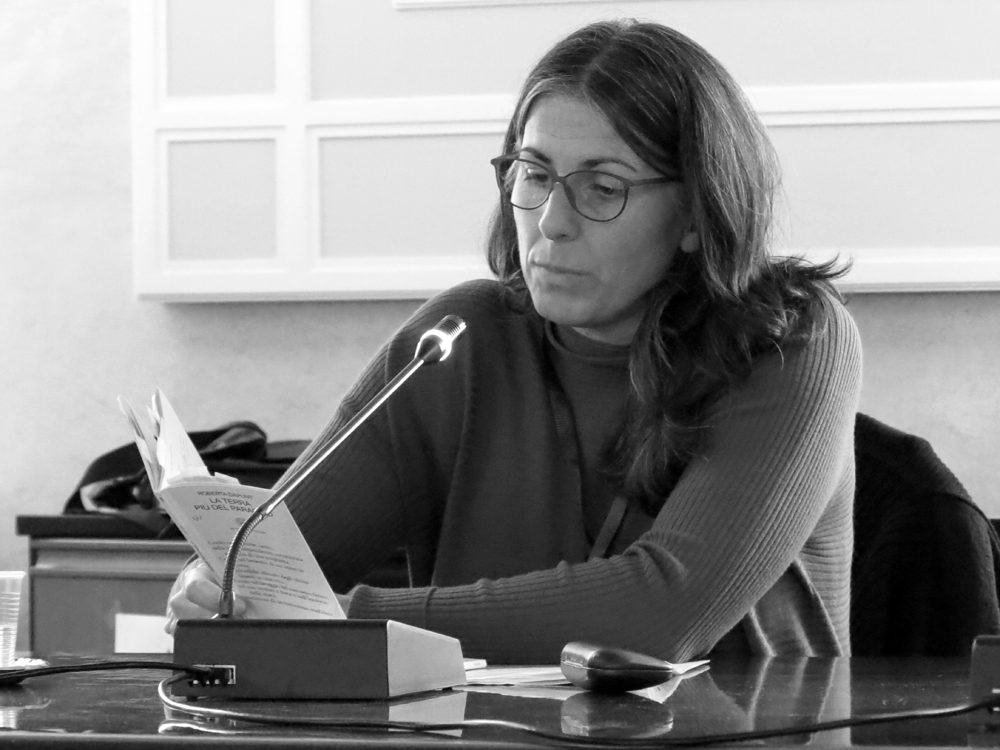
Roberta Dapunt

Roberta Dapunt (born 1970) is an Italian poet. She is known for her 2018 collection of poetry, Sincope, which won the Viareggio Prize.

== Life and career ==
Dapunt was born in 1970 in Val Badia, Italy.

Her first collection of poetry, OscuraMente, was published in 1993 and this was followed by La carzzata mela in 1999. She published a collection of poetry with German translations called Nauz in 2012 which was republished in Italian as Il ponte del Sale in 2017. She also published La terra più del paradiso in 2013.

Her 2018 collection of poetry, Sincope won the Viareggio Prize for poetry.

She also released a music and poetry CD called del perdono in 2001.
