= Nino Valeri =

Italian historian (1897-1978)

Nino Valeri (28 April 1897 - 26 April 1978) was an Italian historian.

== Biography ==
Nino Valeri was born in Padua. His father, Silvio Valeri, was a pharmacist. His uncle, Diego Valeri (1887–1976), had built up a reputation in Italy as a poet, literary scholar and translator. Another uncle was the painter Ugo Valeri.

Nino Valeri worked as a history professor at the universities of Catania, Trieste and Rome, where he took over his teaching chair in contemporary history from Federico Chabod. In 1957 he became a corresponding fellow of the Academy of Sciences at Turin, and in 1962 of the Rome based Accademia dei Lincei. He wrote various essays on themes from medieval history, Italian history and modern/contemporary history. Particularly notable among his books are his works on Giovanni Giolitti (1971) and on political conflict in Italy between 1860 and 1925 ("La lotta politica in Italia dall'unità al 1925", 1945). He contributed to various periodicals and academic journals, such as the Nuova Rivista Storica. He also took charge of the collations "History of Italy" ("Storia d'Italia") and "Society in the new Italy" ("La vita sociale della Nuova Italia") produced by the UTET (publishing house) in Turin.

== Published output ==
- Campanella. Roma, Formiggini, 1931.
- Pietro Verri. Milano, A. Mondadori, 1937.
- L'eredità di Giangaleazzo Visconti. Torino, Società Poligrafica Editrice, 1938.
- La vita di Facino Cane. Torino, Società Subalpina Editrice, 1940.
- La libertà e la pace : orientamenti politici del Rinascimento italiano. Torino, Società subalpina, 1942.
- La lotta politica in Italia dall'unità al 1925 : idee e documenti. Firenze, Le Monnier, 1945.
- L'Italia nell'età dei principati : dal 1343 al 1516. Milano, A. Mondadori, 1949.
- Lezioni di storia moderna intorno ad alcuni scrittori politici italiani dal Risorgimento al fascismo. Milano. Ed. La Goliardica, 1953.
- Guelfi e ghibellini a Milano alla scomparsa di Giangaleazzo Visconti. Milano, Ed. La Goliardica, 1955.
- Lezioni di storia moderna : appunti intorno alla crisi del primo dopoguerra. Milano, La Goliardica, Edizioni universitarie, 1955.
- Da Giolitti a Mussolini : momenti della crisi del liberalismo. Firenze, Parenti, 1956.
- Figure e momenti del Rinascimento italiano : lezioni di storia moderna dell'anno 1957-58. Roma, Tip. Marces, 1957.
- Le origini dello Stato moderno in Italia (1328-1450), (Estr. da: Storia d'Italia). Torino, UTET, 1959.
- Storia d'Italia : il medioevo, (Estr. da: Storia d'Italia, N. Valeri ed altri). Torino, UTET, 1959.
- Lezioni sull'antifascismo, (N. Valeri ed altri). Bari, Laterza, 1960.
- Trent'anni di storia politica italiana, 1915-1945, (N. Valeri ed altri). Torino, ERI, 1962.
- D'Annunzio davanti al fascismo. Firenze, Le Monnier, 1963.
- Giovanni Giolitti. Torino, UTET, 1971
- Tradizione liberale e fascismo. Firenze, Le Monnier, 1971.
- Turati e la Kuliscioff. Firenze, Le Monnier, 1974
- Dalla Belle epoque al fascismo : momenti e personaggi. Bari, Laterza, 1975.
- Pagine recuperate. (A cura di Giulio Cervani). Udine, Del Bianco, 1998.
