= Flavio Santi =

Italian writer, poet, and translator

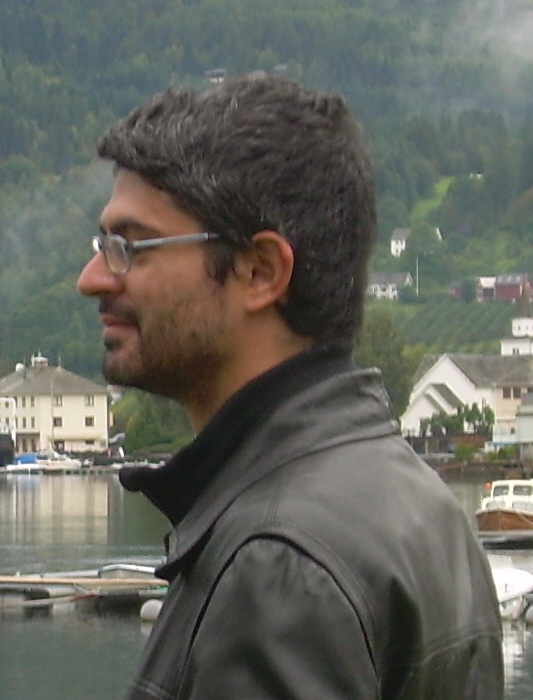
Flavio Santi at the Ulvik Festival, Norway

Flavio Santi (born March 15, 1973) is an Italian writer, poet, and translator.

== Life and career ==
Santi, as a poet, writes in both Italian and the Friulian language, influenced by his family roots in Colloredo di Monte Albano. His Friulian collection, Rimis te sachete, is among his publications and has obtained positive reviews, including a mention in the Oxford Handbook of Italian Literature. His works in Italian include Mappe del genere umano and Quanti (2021 Viareggio Prize). His poetry has also been translated into English and other languages.

He made his fiction debut in 1999 with the novel Diario di bordo della rosa, which includes commentary by Michele Mari. An expanded edition appeared in 2014. His works examine themes such as vampirism from a historical perspective in L'eterna notte dei Bosconero and memoir in Il tai e l'arte di girovagare in motocicletta. The death of his poet friend, Simone Cattaneo, led him to create a modern reinterpretation of Luciano Bianciardi's La vita agra, titled Aspetta primavera, Lucky, which was nominated for the Strega Prize in 2011. Santi appears in two anthologies representing different generations of contemporary Italian literature: as a poet in Nuovissima Poesia Italiana (2004) and as a prose writer in A occhi aperti (2008). He has also written detective stories: novels featuring inspector Drago Furlan and a thriller, L'autunno del sultano, with architect Raimondo D'Aronco.

== Works ==
=== Fiction ===
==== Novels ====
- Diario di bordo della rosa (1 ed.). PeQuod. 1999.
- L'eterna notte dei Bosconero, Rizzoli, 2006.
- Aspetta primavera, Lucky, Socrates, 2011.
- Diario di bordo della rosa (2 ed.). Laurana Editore. 2014.
- La primavera tarda ad arrivare. La prima indagine dell'ispettore Furlan, Mondadori, 2016.
- L'estate non perdona. La nuova indagine dell'ispettore Furlan, Mondadori, 2017.
- L'autunno del sultano, Solferino, 2024.

==== Short Stories ====
- La guerra civile in Italia, Sartorio, 2008.
- Chê fricàte rognose de vie Merlanis. Un'indagine lampo di Drago Furlan, in Fricokiller, MorgantiEditori, 2021, pp. 187–214.

=== Poetry ===
- Viticci, Stamperia dell'Arancio, 1998.
- Rimis te sachete, Marsilio, 2001.
- Mappe del genere umano, Scheiwiller, 2012.
- Quanti - Truciolature, scie, onde. 1999-2019 (prefazione di Niccolò Scaffai), Industria&Letteratura, 2020.

Translated and published

- In English: Italville. New Italian Writing, Exile Editions, Toronto 2005, pp. 161–171.
- In Indonesian: Poetry and Sincerity. International Poetry Festival Indonesia 2006, CIPTA, 2006, pp. 353–64.
- In German: Grand Tour. Reisen durch die junge Lyrik Europas, Hanser, 2019, p. 291.
- In English: "Journal of Italian Translation", XVI, 2021, pp. 276–79; Books and Librairies. Poems, Everyman Library Pocket Poets, 2021, p. 75.

=== Non-fiction ===
- Il tai e l'arte di girovagare in motocicletta. Friuli on the road, Laterza, 2011.

Essays

- Aspettando Superman. Storia non convenzionale dei supereroi, Gaffi, 2013.
- Laboratorio di scrittura, Giunti, 2016.
- Figurando il Paradiso. Metafora religiosa e vita materiale nella letteratura italiana dalle origini a Dante, Mimesis, 2016.
- L'altro cielo di Lombardia. Per una storia alternativa del Rinascimento e del Barocco lombardo, Unicopli, 2022.
