= Patrizia Cavalli =

Italian poet (1947–2022)

- Cavalli in 1984
- Born: 17 April 1947; Todi, Italy
- Died: 21 June 2022 (aged 75); Rome, Italy
- Occupation: Poet
- Years active: 1968–2022

Signature
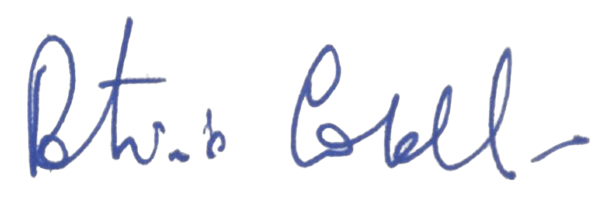

Patrizia Cavalli (17 April 1947 – 21 June 2022) was an Italian poet.

== Biography ==
Born in Todi on 17 April 1947, Cavalli graduated with a thesis devoted to the aesthetics of music.

Although most of her work was poetic, she also translated the works of Molière and Shakespeare into Italian. In 1968, she began living in Rome. In 1999, she won the Viareggio Prize for poetry for her work Sempre aperto teatro. In 2006, she received the Premio Dessì for Pigre divinità e pigra sorte. In 2019, she was the recipient of the Premio Campiello for Con passi giapponesi.

Patrizia Cavalli died in Rome on 21 June 2022 at the age of 75.

== Works ==
- Le mie poesie non cambieranno il mondo (1974)
- Il cielo (1981)
- Poesie 1974-1992 (1992)
- L'io singolare proprio mio (1999)
- Sempre aperto teatro (1999)
- La Guardania (2004)
- Pigra divinità e pigra sorte (2006)
- La Patria (2011)
