= Corrado De Vita =

Italian journalist and writer

Corrado De Vita (1905, Noto – 21 September 1987, Rome), was an Italian journalist and writer.

== Early life ==
He was born in Noto but completed his studies in Naples, graduating in Literature, a pupil of the Dante scholar it:Francesco Torraca. His thesis was on Ariosto. He then moved to Milan and collaborated with La Fiera Letteraria, a cultural weekly founded and directed by Umberto Fracchia. Later he was editor of the cultural page of the newspaper it:La Tribuna. At the end of the 30s he moved to Il Giornale d'Italia for which he became a war correspondent and made a number of voyages with the Regia Marina.

== During World War Two ==
As a war correspondent De Vita witnessed first-hand a number of clashes with the British fleet in which the Regia Marina suffered disastrous defeats: the Battle of Calabria (July 9, 1940), the Battle of Taranto (November 12, 1940) and the Battle of Cape Matapan (March 23–29, 1941). From this experience grew his first book The Paradise of Sailors (1942), a collection of partly autobiographical short stories. In the same year, after his war period, he was hired by Corriere della Sera as deputy editor-in-chief.

During this assignment, he sometimes had some linotypists from the Corriere secretly compose the texts for the anti-fascist sheet Fronte, transporting himself the heavy type from the rotary press to be printed at the home of Albe and it:Lica Steiner, where Elio Vittorini also worked. The night of the occupation of Rome by the Germans (8 September 1943), in agreement with Vittorini, Pietro Ingrao, Celeste Negarville, Gillo Pontecorvo and it:Salvatore Di Benedetto, De Vita had the presses of the Corriere print a large number of copies of the single-sheet paper La Liberta del Popolo. Two arrest warrants were issued for him because of this and he was saved only with the help of his friend it:Raffaele Carrieri who kept him hidden in his Milanese home in via Borgospesso.

== Postwar period ==
In 1945, after the war, together with it:Michele Rago, Alfonso Gatto and Mario Bonfadini he founded the afternoon newspaper it:Milano Sera and was its director from 15 December 1945 to 4 November 1954. In this role he promoted the creation of the Cooperative of the Popular Book (Colip), the first series of paperback economic books of the post-war period. Subsequently he directed first the Parenti publishing house and then Editori Riuniti, of which he was president.

In 1972 he returned to his war experiences with the novel W L'i… which won the Campione Prize, and also published Knowledge of Stefano (Cognoscenza di Stefano), with a preface by Carlo Bo, a collection of verses dedicated to his son who died tragically. This work won him the Viareggio Prize.

His second volume of poems Sopra è la Terra dates to 1980, with an introductory essay by Michele Rago.

He died in Rome on 21 September 1987, two years after the death of his wife, the painter Caterina Castellucci, known as Katy, whom he had married in 1940.

== Works ==
- Sailors' Paradise (Il paradiso dei marinai) Milan, Garzanti, 1942.
- I am alive (o sono vivo), Milan, Garzanti, 1946.
- "W l'i...", Milan, Garzanti, 1972.
- Acquaintance with Stefano (Cognoscenza di Stefano), poems, Milan, Garzanti, 1972.
- Above is the earth (Sopra è la terra), poems, Milan, Garzanti, 1980.
