= Ettore Lo Gatto =

Italian linguist, literary historian, translator, critic and academic

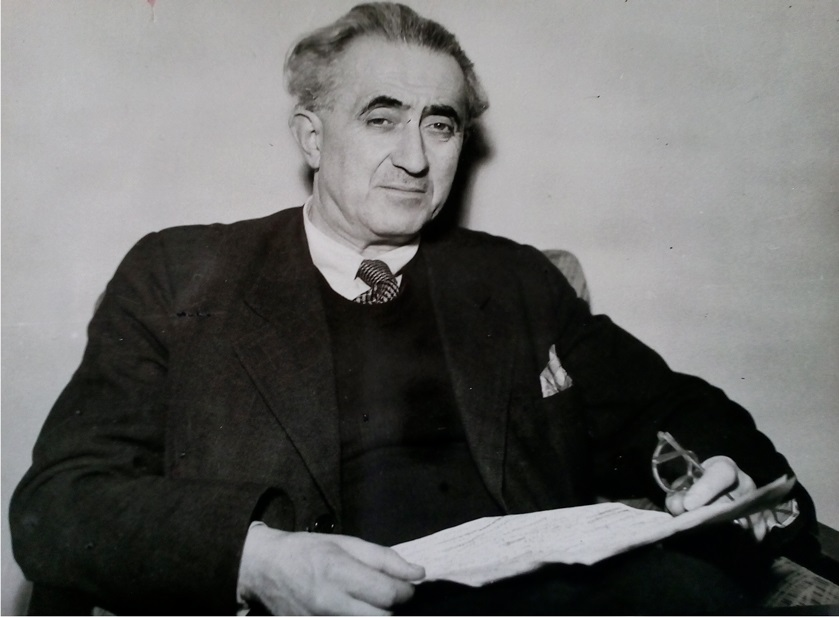
- Born: 20 May 1890; Naples, Italy
- Died: 16 March 1983 (aged 92); Rome, Italy
- Occupation: Writer

Ettore Lo Gatto (20 May 1890 – 16 March 1983) was an Italian linguist, literary historian, translator, critic and academic.

== Life and career ==
Born in Naples, Lo Gatto wrote his first novel, I misteri della Siberia, aged 13 years old. After graduating in law at the University of Naples Federico II, he followed some philosophy courses and then became interested in German studies, holding academic trips to Munich, Heidelberg, Bayreuth and Zürich and publishing translations of works by Friedrich Nietzsche, Richard Wagner and Hans Sachs.

During World War I Lo Gatto was taken prisoner and interned in a camp in Sigmundsherberg, where he came into contact with Russian culture. After the war he knew a Russian teacher, Zoja Matveevna, who later became his wife and his closer collaborator. Starting from 1919 he started an intense activity of translation, cultural promotion and research in the field of Russian literature. In 1920 he founded the academic journal Russia, and one year later he founded and was the first secretary of the Istituto per l'Europa orientale (IPEO, Institute for Eastern Europe), and founded and directed the journal Europa orientale ("Eastern Europe").

Among Lo Gatto's major works, Poesia russa della rivoluzione ("Russian Poetry of the Revolution", 1923), Storia della letteratura russa ("History of Russian literature", seven volumes published between 1928 and 1944), Gli artisti italiani in Russia ("Italian artists in Russia", three volumes, 1934–1943), Storia del teatro russo ("History of Russian Theatre", 1952) Storia della letteratura russa contemporanea ("History of Contemporary Russian Literature", 1958–1968) and Storia della letteratura russa moderna ("History of Modern Russian Literature", 1960–1968).

Lo Gatto also had an important academic career, first as a professor of Slavic literature in his alma mater, professor of Slavic philology at University of Padua, and later as professor of Russian language and literature for about 25 years at the Sapienza University of Rome. He was also visiting professor of Italian literature at Charles University in Prague between 1936 and 1939. Lo Gatto published the magazine "Russia", worked and became friends with a number of Russian immigrants, notably with Mikhail Osorgin (a writer and a journalist), Boris Zaitsev (writer, was nominated for the Novel literature prize) and Pavel Muratov (art historian and writer).

In 1960 Lo Gatto won the Viareggio Prize for criticism with Pushkin, storia di un poeta e del suo eroe ("Pushkin, Story of a Poet and his Hero"). He was an Academician of the Lincei from 1972 till his death in 1983.
