= Antonio Debenedetti =

Italian writer (1937–2021)

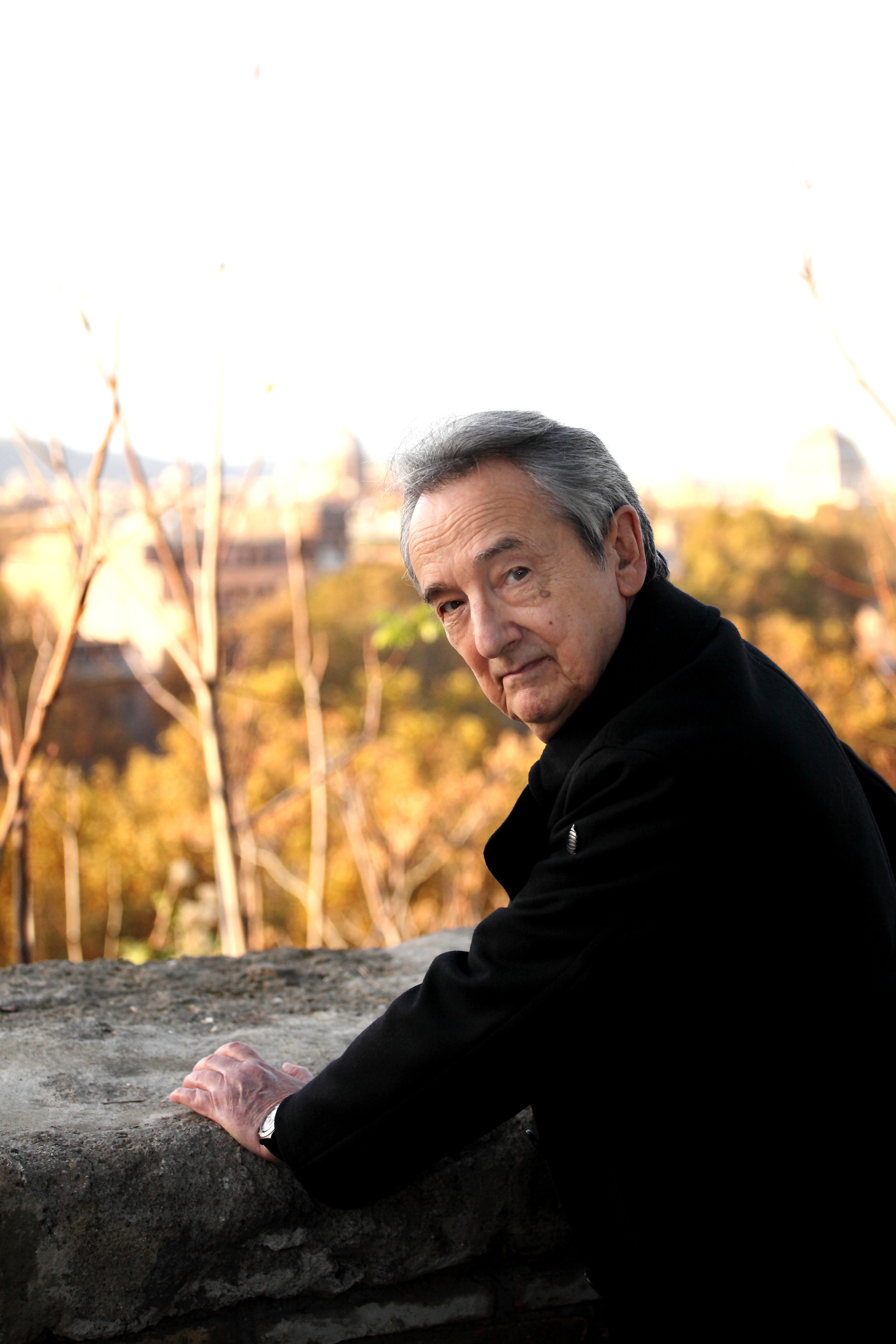
- Debenedetti in 2010
- Born: 12 June 1937; Turin, Italy
- Died: 3 October 2021 (aged 84); Rome, Italy
- Occupation: Writer

Antonio Debenedetti (12 June 1937 – 3 October 2021) was an Italian writer.

== Biography ==
Debenedetti received the Viareggio Prize in Fiction in 1991 for Se la vita non è vita and the Napoli Prize in 2005 for E fu settembre.

== Works ==
- Rifiuto di obbedienza (1958)
- Monsieur Kitsch (1972)
- Se la vita non è vita (1976)
- Maman (1976)
- In assenza del signor Plot (1976)
- Ancora un bacio (1981)
- Spavaldi e strambi (1987)
- Racconti naturali e straordinari (1993)
- Giacomino (1994)
- Amarsi male. Undici sentimenti brevi (1998)
- Un giovedì dopo le cinque (2000)
- E fu settembre (2005)
- Un piccolo grande Novecento. Conversazione con Paolo Di Paolo (2005)
- In due (2008)
- L' ultimo dandy (2009)
- Quasi un racconto (2009)
- E nessuno si accorse che mancava una stella (2010)
- Dal Piacere alla Dolce Vita. Roma 1889-1960, una capitale allo specchio (2010)
- Il tempo degli angeli e degli assassini (2011)

== Honors ==
- Order of Merit of the Italian Republic (2004)
