= Marisa Volpi =

Italian art historian and writer

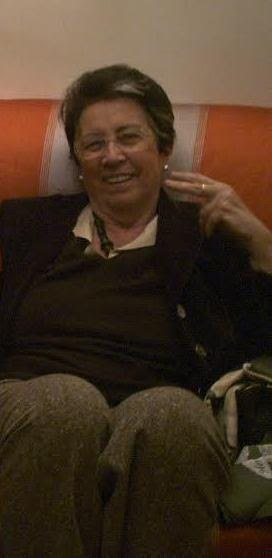
- Born: 19 August 1928; Macerata
- Died: 13 May 2015 (aged 86); Rome

Marisa Volpi (19 August 1928 – 13 May 2015) was an Italian art historian and writer.

== Biography ==
Marisa Volpi was born in Macerata in 1928 to Dante and Matilde Andreani. Volpi grew up in Rome where she attended Giulio Cesare high school. She graduated with a thesis in Philosophy from the University of Rome La Sapienza in 1952 and then further specialized in art history in Florence in 1956 with the art historian Roberto Longhi. Volpi then taught at the universities of Cagliari and Rome. Volpi worked in 17th and 18th-century modern art and contemporary art and wrote papers on Impressionism, symbolism, and expressionism. Volpi taught until 2003. In 2004 she was appointed Emeritus Professor of History of Contemporary Art.

Volpi married Ferdinando Orlandini and often published under the surname "Volpi Orlandini". In 1966 Volpi curated the exhibitions of both Italian and foreign artists at the Editalia Gallery in via del Corso in Rome. Since 1978 Volpi combined the work of being a university professor, art critic and historian with being a writer. She began writing fiction for magazines like "Paragone" and "New topics" before publishing in books. In 1986 she won the Viareggio Prize for fiction. Volpi died in Rome in 2015.
