= Enrico Testa =

Italian essayist, poet and teacher

Enrico Testa (born 1956) is an Italian poet. He works as a professor of Italian studies at the University of Genova.

== Early life ==
He received a PhD at Università di Pavia.

== Career ==
Enrico Testa is a professor of Italian Studies. He worked on short stories of the 15th and 16th century, and on the novel; in particular he became dedicated to 20th century Italian poetry, studying poets such Eugenio Montale, Giorgio Caproni, Alberto Vigevani and Edoardo Sanguineti.

He edited an anthology of Italian Contemporary Poetry (Dopo la lirica. Poeti italiani 1960–2000, Einaudi 2005). He translated High Windows by Philip Larkin. Testa was a visiting professor at Aarhus University in Denmark and a member of the PhD commission at Université Sorbonne Nouvelle of Paris.

He published books of poetry and dedicated some of his poems to his favorite football team, Sampdoria.

== Selected poetry ==
- Le faticose attese, Genova: San Marco dei Giustiniani, 1988
- In controtempo, Torino: Einaudi, 1994
- La sostituzione, Torino: Einaudi, 2001
- Pasqua di neve, Torino: Einaudi, 2008
- Ablativo, Torino: Einaudi, 2013
- Cairn, Torino: Einaudi, 2018
- L'erba di nessuno, Torino: Einaudi, 2023

== Criticism ==
- Il libro di poesia. Tipologie e analisi macrotestuali, Genova: Il Melangolo, 1983
- Simulazione di parlato. Fenomeni dell'oralità nelle novelle del Quattro-Cinquecento, Firenze: Accademia della Crusca, 1991
- Lo stile semplice. Discorso e romanzo, Torino: Einaudi, 1997
- Per interposta persona. Lingua e poesia nel secondo Novecento, Roma: Bulzoni, 1999
- Montale, Torino: Einaudi 2000
- Eroi e figuranti. Il personaggio nel romanzo, Torino: Einaudi, 2009
- Una costanza sfigurata. Lo statuto del soggetto nella poesia di Sanguineti, Novara: Interlinea, 2012
- L'italiano nascosto. Una storia linguistica e culturale, Torino: Einaudi, 2014
- Bulgaro. Storia di una parola malfamata, Bologna: Il Mulino, 2019

== Awards ==
- 2013 – Premio Viareggio-Rèpaci, Poetry;
- Premio Mondello (for literary critic);
- Nel 2023 Premio Dessì;
