= Manara Valgimigli =

Italian classical philologist (1876–1965)

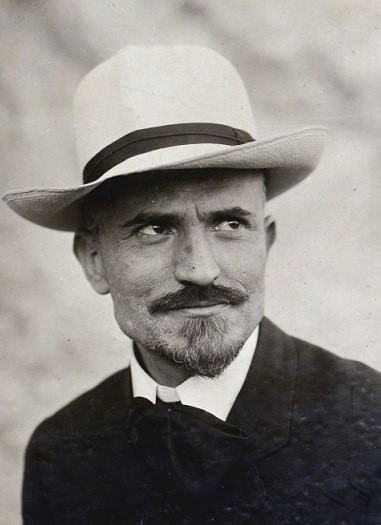
Image of M Valgimigli

Manara Valgimigli (9 July 1876, in San Piero in Bagno – 28 August 1965, in Vilminore di Scalve) was an Italian classical philologist and Greek scholar, best remembered for his book Poeti e filosofi di Grecia (1965), which won a Viareggio Prize in non-fiction. A graduate of the University of Bologna, he taught Greek literature at the University of Messina and the University of Pisa. A member of the Italian Socialist Party, he was one of several prominent signatories of the Manifesto of the Anti-Fascist Intellectuals in 1925.

== Legacy ==
In 1975, a psycho-pedagogical lyceum in Rimini was dedicated to Valgimigli. In 1998, it was merged with city's classical lyceum to become the multidisciplinary Julius Caesar–Manara Valgimigli Lyceum, the largest secondary school in the Province of Rimini.
