= Sergio Solmi =

Italian poet, essayist and literary critic

- Born: 16 December 1899; Rieti, Italy
- Died: 7 October 1981 (aged 81); Milan, Italy

Sergio Solmi (16 December 1899 – 7 October 1981) was an Italian poet, essayist and literary critic.

Born in Rieti, Solmi's studies mainly focused on French literature and Italian contemporary literature. He released several collections of poetries, with a style influenced by hermeticism.

During his career Solmi was recipient of several literary awards, including the Bagutta Prize and two Viareggio Prizes.
