= Luisa Adorno =

Italian writer (1921–2021)

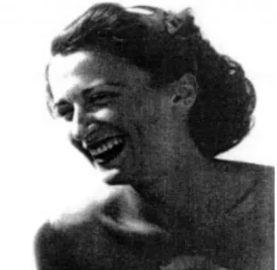
- Born: Mila Curradi; 2 August 1921; Pisa, Italy
- Died: 12 July 2021 (aged 99); Rome, Italy
- Occupation: Writer
- Awards: Premio Alpi Apuane; Premio Prato-Europa; Premio nazionale letterario Pisa; Viareggio Prize; Premio Vittorini

Luisa Adorno, pseudonym of Mila Curradi (2 August 1921 – 12 July 2021) was an Italian writer and teacher.

== Biography ==
Adorno spent her career as a secondary school teacher. She collaborated with the magazines Il Mondo, Paragone, L'Indice dei libri del mese, Abitare, and Italianieuropei. In 2005, she was a judge for the Premio Brancati.

In 1963, Adorno was awarded the Premio Alpi Apuane. In 1985, she was given the Premio Prato-Europa and the Premio nazionale letterario Pisa for Le dorate stanze.[3 Italian] In 1990, she won the Viareggio Prize for Arco di luminara. In 1999, a collection of her works was housed in the Archivio di Stato di Firenze, where it remains to this day. That same year, she was awarded the Premio Vittorini for Sebben che siamo donne. In 2001, she became a Grand Officer of the Order of Merit of the Italian Republic.

Luisa Adorno died in Rome on 12 July 2021 at the age of 99.

== Distinctions ==
- Grand Officer of the Order of Merit of the Italian Republic (2001)

== Works ==
- L'ultima provincia (1983)
- Le dorate stanze (1985)
- Arco di luminara (1990)
- La libertà ha un cappello a cilindro (1993)
- Come a un ballo in maschera (1995)
- Sebben che siamo donne (1999)
- Foglia d'acero (2001)
- Tutti qui con me (2008)
- Italia mia (2010)
