= Giuseppe Boffa =

Italian journalist and historian

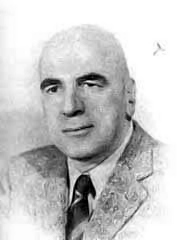

Member of the Senate
- In office 27 June 1987 – 13 September 1998
- Constituency: Campania

Personal details
- Born: 23 July 1923 Milan, Italy
- Died: 23 September 1998 (aged 75) Rome, Italy
- Party: Italian Communist Party
- Occupation: historian, journalist

Giuseppe Boffa (Milan, 23 July 1923 – Rome, 13 September 1998) was an Italian journalist, historian and politician. He took part in World War II resistance movement, joined the Italian Communist Party,worked for the Italian Communist newspaper, l'Unità, and wrote about Soviet history.

His work, The History of Soviet Union, published in 1976, influenced leaders of the Soviet Union, such as Mikhail Gorbachev. He was awarded two Viareggio Prizes, one of which was a Special Award for a Journalistic Report for his book Inside the Khrushchev Era.
