= Francesco Pecoraro =

Francesco Pecoraro (born 1945) is an Italian novelist, architect, and poet.

== Education and career ==
Born in Rome in 1945. Pecoraro graduated with a degree in architecture in 1971, and he works as an architect both privately and in a public institution.

== Writing ==
In 2007, he published the collection of stories "Where do you think you're going?", which won the Napoli Prize, the Giuseppe Berto Prize, and was a finalist for the Chiara Prize. A year later, he published the volume of writings "This and Other Prehistories", reviewed, among others, by Filippo La Porta.

In 2012, he published the poetry collection "Vertebral Primordial".

La vita in tempo di pace (Life in Peacetime) (2013) is about the inner thoughts of Ivo Brandani, a civil engineer working for a private company which is replacing the coral in the Red Sea with a synthetic substance. This was his first novel and won the Viareggio Prize, the Mondello Prize, and the Volponi Prize, was a finalist for the Bergamo Prize, and made it to the shortlist for the Strega Prize in 2014. The novel has been translated into English, French, Spanish, and Dutch, and has often been considered a potential candidate for the title of Great Italian Novel. This work was first published in Italian 2013 by Ponte alle grazie, with the first English translation by Antony Shugaar in 2018 by Seagull Press.

In 2019, he published the novel The Road, which was a finalist for the Campiello Prize.

In 2021, he released Nodulo, a monologue in verse for reciting voice, accompanied by illustrations. Also in 2021, he published the collection Rooms and Spaces, which includes the stories Where Do You Think You're Going and all the other unpublished stories of the writer.

In 2023, he released Only True is Summer, a novel that tells the story of three young Romans during the G8 summit in Genoa in 2001. Solo vera è l'estate The Only Thing That Matters is Summer (or Only the Summer is Real) concerns three characters, Gaicomoo, Enzo, and Filippo who flee from the city's heat to the Tyrrhenian coast.

The Avenue discusses Italy's recent history, labor struggles, and urban transformation.
