= Pierluigi Cappello =

Italian poet

- Born: 8 August 1967; Gemona del Friuli, Italy
- Died: 1 October 2017 (aged 50)
- Occupation: Poet
- Awards: Viareggio Prize (2010); Premio Montale (2004); Raiziss de/Palchi Fellowship (2015)

Pierluigi Cappello (8 August 1967 – 1 October 2017) was an Italian poet. He was born in Gemona del Friuli, and raised in Chiusaforte.

Cappello won the 2010 Viareggio-Rèpaci prize for poetry with his collection Mandate a dire all'imperatore. His other prizes include the Premio Montale for Dittico (Liboà editore in Dogliani, 2004), the Premio Bagutta and Premio Nazionale Letterario Pisa for Assetto Di Volo (Crocetti Editore, Milan 2006) and the Premio Terzani for his prose work, Questa libertà. In 2013 BUR Rizzoli published his selected poems in the volume Azzurro Elementare. Poesie 1992-2010, and, in 2017, a group of thirty new poems, Stato Di Quiete. English translations of his work have appeared in Poetry, PN Review, AGNI, Asymptote, Narrative Magazine, and several other journals, and were awarded the 2015 Raiziss and de Palchi Translation Award from the Academy of American Poets.

Cappello and his family were victims of the 6.5 magnitude earthquake that struck northern Italy on May 6, 1976. As a result, the family was relocated to a prefab community provided by Austria, where Cappello remained for most of his life. At age sixteen he suffered a tragic motorbike crash, which saw him using a wheelchair for the rest of his life.

In 2014 Cappello was named a beneficiary of the Legge Bacchelli—a guarantee of lifetime financial support from the Italian government for artists of merit.
