= Raffaele Calzini =

Italian art critic and writer

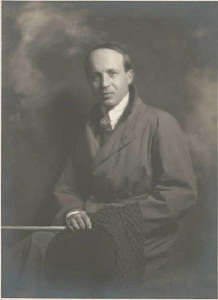
- Born: 29 December 1885; Milan, Kingdom of Italy
- Died: 2 September 1953; Cortina d'Ampezzo, province of Belluno, Italy
- Occupations: Writer; art critic

Raffaele Calzini (29 December 1885 – 2 September 1953) was an Italian art critic and writer. His novel Segantini, romanzo della montagna, about the short-lived Alpine painter Giovanni Segantini, won the Viareggio Prize in 1934.

== Publications ==
Among Calzini's many works are:

- L'amore escluso. Milano: Sonzogno [1920];
- Uberto dell'Orto, pittore. Roma: Alfieri et Lacroix, 1921;
- La tela di Penelope. Roma: Mondadori, 1922;
- Giorgio Lukomski. Milano: Bottega di poesia, 1923;
- La collana d'ambra. Milano: Fratelli Treves, 1928;
- Giuseppe Amisani. Milano: Edizioni del Poligono, 1931;
- Paolo Vietti Violi. Genève : Les archives internationales, 1932;
- Un cuore e due spade. Milano: Fratelli Treves, 1932;
- Segantini, romanzo della montagna. Milano: Mondadori, 1934;
- La bella italiana da Botticelli al Tiepolo. Milano: Domus, 1935;
- La commediante veneziana. Milano: Mondadori, 1935;
- Agonia della Cina. Milano: Mondadori, 1937;
- Trionfi e disfatte di Nuova York. Milano: Ceschina, 1937;
- Il taciturno. Milano: Mondadori, 1939;
- Lampeggia al nord di Sant'Elena. Milano: Garzanti, 1941;
- Amanti. Milano: Mondadori, 1941;
- Gloria. Milano: Garzanti, 1945;
- La bella italiana da Botticelli a Spadini. Milano: Editoriale Domus, 1945;
- Edmea. Milano: Mondadori, 1945;
- Milano fin de siècle: 1890-1900. Milano: U. Hoepli, 1946.
