= Raffaello Brignetti =

Italian writer

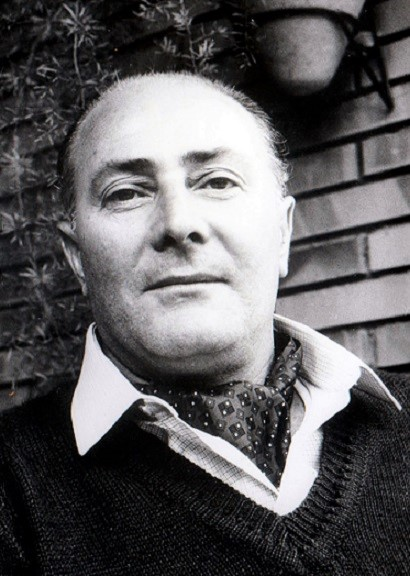
Raffaello Brignetti

Raffaello Brignetti (born Isola del Giglio, 21 September 1921 - died Rome, 7 February 1978) was an Italian writer. He grew up on the island of Elba where his father was a lighthouse keeper.

He moved to Rome in the middle of the Second World War, and spent a couple of years in German labour camps. His diary of the war years was published posthumously.

He studied modern Italian literature at university, graduating in 1947. He was a disciple of Ungaretti, in common with other young idealistic intellectuals of his era such as Leone Piccioni, Silori Luigi, Mario Petrucciani, Elio Filippo Accrocca, etc.

He embarked on a journalistic career in Rome, working in leading papers like Il Tempo, Il Giornale d'Italia and the Corriere della Sera.

He described Pier Paolo Pasolini as "Essentially a Bellian...." Four of his works were cited in an academic study of the humanities.

In 1961, a car crash left Brignetti paralyzed. The ensuing years saw him at his most productive.

He won the Premio Viareggio for Il gabbiano azzurro (1967), and the Premio Strega for La spiaggia d'oro (1971).

He lived for a long time in the Medici tower of Marciana Marina on Elba and then in the small apartment at the foot of the tower. He died in 1978.

The Isola d'Elba-Raffaele Brignetti Literary Prize is named after him.

Brignetti's work is noted for its familiarity with, and treatment of, the sea and maritime life.
