= Diego Valeri (poet) =

Italian poet and literary critic

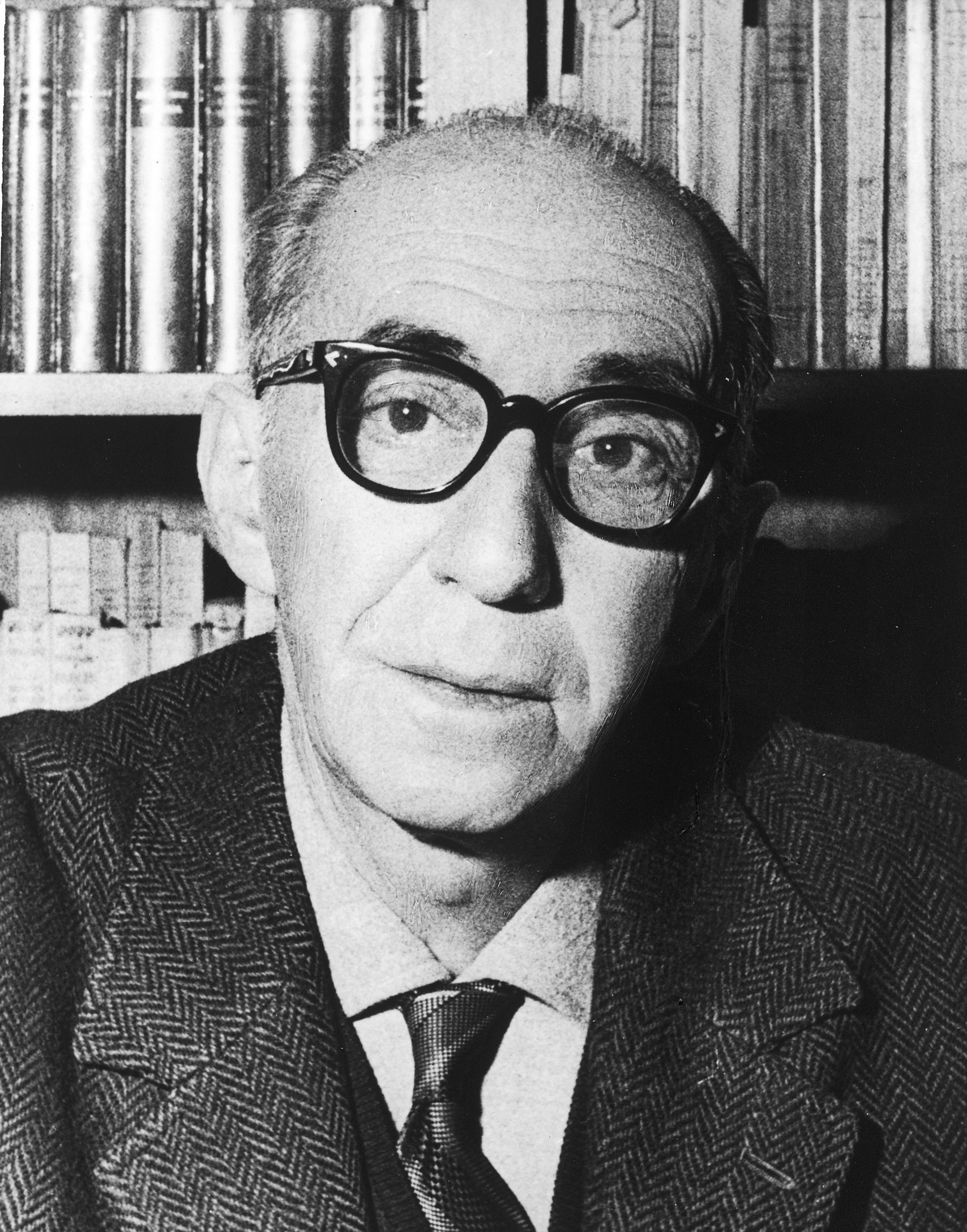
- Born: January 25, 1887; Piove di Sacco
- Died: November 28, 1976 (aged 89); Rome, Italy
- Occupations: Poet, teacher, translator, literary critic

Diego Valeri (25 January 1887, Piove di Sacco - 28 November 1976) was an Italian poet, teacher, translator and literary critic.

Valeri was a member of the Accademia dei Lincei and Alleanza della cultura. In 1967 he received the Viareggio Prize.

== Biography ==
Valeri was born in Piove di Sacco on 25 January 1887. He attended the University of Padua, where he studied under philologist Vincenzo Crescini. He graduated in 1908 with a thesis on the impact of French theater on the works of Paolo Ferrari. In 1913 he published his first works, Monodia d'amore and Le gaie tristezze. The following year Valeri traveled to Paris to attend a course at Sorbonne before returning to Italy to become a teacher.

During his time as a teacher Valeni was a columnist for the magazine Nuova Antologia, where he also published several translations and verses. He would later reprint these under the title Umana in 1916, Crisalide in 1919, and Ariele in 1924. These would later be collected as part of Poesie vecchie e nuove in 1939.

In 1939 Valeri began teaching at the University of Padua and later held the university's chair of History of Modern and Contemporary Italian Literature. He held this position for a total of twenty years, excluding the years of Nazi occupation from 1943 to 1945, during which time he lived in Switzerland as a political refugee. During his time in refuge Valeri worked as a publicist and translator.

Valeri returned to Italy after the end of World War II and briefly served as the editor for Il Gazzettino. He joined the Alleanza della cultura in 1948 and in 1950, attended the Berlin conference. He also taught at the University of Salento. After retiring from teaching Valeri served on the city council for Venice and between 1969 through 1973, served as the president of the Istituto Veneto di Scienze, Lettere ed Arti. Valeri was also a member of the Accademia dei Lincei.

Valeri died in Rome on 27 November 1976. During his lifetime Valeri was a prolific poet and wrote over 300 poems in Italian and French; Valeri has stated that he has "sacrificed almost as many as I have saved". For his work, Valeri won the Viareggio Prize.

== Themes ==
Valeri's work contains themes of everyday life and humanity. Per Gaetana Marrone, he also "wrote in French with the dual purpose of meeting Europe on its own terms and moving away from Italian regionalism, the latter motive putting him at odds with Italian cultural circles."

== Works ==
=== Poetry ===
- Le gaie tristezze, Sandron, Palermo 1913
- Umana, Taddei, Ferrara 1915 and 1921
- Crisalide, Taddei, Ferrara 1919 and 1921
- Vento d’alba (1922) with music by Lino Liviabella
- Ariele, Mondadori, Milan 1924
- Tempo che muore, Mondadori, Milan 1924
- Il Campanellino, SEI, Turin 1928, 2ª ed., Società Editrice Internazionale, Turin 1930
- Ave Maria (1935) with music by Lino Liviabella
- Scherzo e finale, Mondadori, Milan 1937
- Trittico lirico su musica di Lino Liviabella: I) Tragico (Rosetta), II) Soave (Veneziana), III) Comico (Colloquio) (1937)
- Terzo tempo, Mondadori, Milan 1950
- Metamorfosi dell'angelo, Milan 1956
- Jeux de mots, Parigi 1956
- Notte di Natale (1956) with music by Lino Liviabella
- Il flauto a due canne, Mondadori, Milan 1958
- Poesie, Mondadori, Milan 1962
- Verità di uno, Mondadori, Milan 1970
- Sgelo, Mondadori, Milan 1967
- Calle del vento, Mondadori, Milan 1975
- Poesie inedite o "come", 1977
- Poesie scelte (1910-1975), edited by Carlo della Corte, Milan, Mondadori, 1977
- Il mio nome sul vento. Poesie 1908-1976, edited by Carlo Londero, Rovigo, Il Ponte del Sale, 2022

=== Studies and essays ===
- Poeti francesi del nostro tempo, Piacenza 1924
- Montaigne, Rome 1925
- Scrittori francesi, Milan 1937
- Saggi e note di letteratura francese moderna, Florence, 1941
- Littérature française, Milan 1949
- Il simbolismo francese da Nerval a De Régnier, Padua, 1954

=== Various writings ===
- I colli Euganei, Florence 1932
- Fantasie veneziane, Padua 1934, Milan 1953
- Guida sentimentale di Venezia, Padua 1942 and Florence 1955
- Città materna, Padua 1944
- Le leggende del Gral, Turin 1944
- Taccuino svizzero, Milan 1946

=== Theater ===
- Soregina, Venice 1958

=== Translations ===
- Mirella, by Mistral, Turin 1930 and 1944
- La signora Bovary by Flaubert, Milan 1936 and 1951
- Romanzi e racconti d'amore nel medio evo francese, Milan 1943 and 1944
- Il rosso e il nero by Stendhal, Milan 1936
- Il Vangelo di S. Luca, Venice, 1950 and 1955
- Quaranta favole by La Fontaine, Florence 1952
- Cinquanta poesie by Goethe, Milan 1951
- Ifigenia in Tauride, Venice 1954
- Conoscenza e incoscienza di Dio, Rome 1947 and Milan 1954
- Lirici tedeschi, Milan 1959
- Lirici francesi, Milan 1960

== Bibliography ==
- Bibliografia 1926-1996: https://web.archive.org/web/20201121104858/http://www.diegovaleri.it/fondo.html@act=5
- Antonello Nave, Il carme 'Rodiginorum Goliardorum' di Diego Valeri e Marino Cremesini, in “Quaderni per la storia dell’Università di Padova”, 36, 2003, pp. 153-158.
- Matteo Giancotti, Diego Valeri, Padova, Il Poligrafo, 2013.
- Matteo Giancotti, Valeri, Diego, in Dizionario Biografico degli Italiani, Rome, Istituto dell'Enciclopedia Italiana, 97, 2020.
- Antonello Nave, Diego Valeri e gli "Amici dell'Arte", in "Padova e il suo territorio", XXXVI, 211, giugno-luglio 2021, pp. 31-35.
