= Francesca Sanvitale =

Italian novelist and journalist

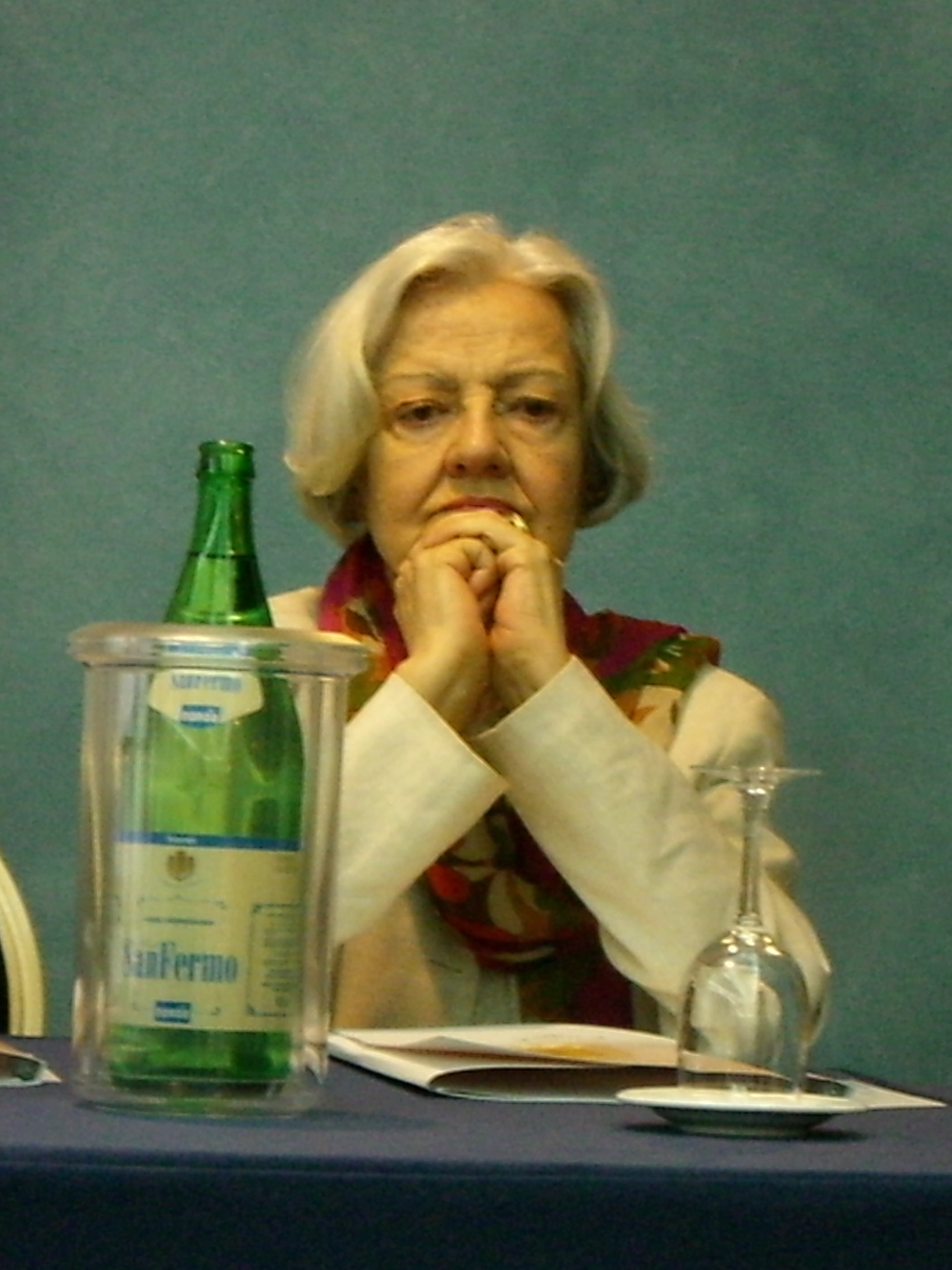
Francesca Sanvitale

Francesca Sanvitale (17 May 1928 – 9 February 2011) was an Italian novelist and journalist, "one of Italy's most renowned contemporary authors".

== Life ==
Born in Milan, Francesca Sanvitale lived in Florence for two decades, gaining a degree there in Italian literature before moving to Rome in 1961. She wrote television plays and contributed to cultural programmes for RAI.

Her first novel was Il cuore borghese (1972). Madre e figlia (1980), a semi-autobiographical novel about an intense relationship between a mother and her illegitimate child, won both the Fregene Prize and the Pozzale Luigi Russo Prize. The protagonist in Sanvitale's third novel, L'uomo del parco (1984), attempted to find the truth about herself through psychoanalysis. As well as other novels, Sanvitale collected short stories in La realtà è un dono (1987) and Separazioni (1997). L'inizio è in autunno won the Viareggio Prize in 2008.

She died in Rome.

== Works ==
- Il cuore borghese [The bourgeois heart], 1972
- Madre e figlia, 1980
- L'uomo del parco: romanzo [The man in the heart], 1984
- La realtà è un dono: racconti [Reality is a gift: stories], 1987
- Mettendo a fuoco : pagine di letteratura e realtà, 1988
- (tr.) Il diavolo in corpo by Raymond Radiguet, 1989. Translated from the French Le Diable au corps (1923)
- Verso Paola, 1991
- Il figlio dell'Impero, 1993
- Tre favole dell'ansia e dell'ombra, 1994
- Separazioni [Separations], 1997
- Camera ottica: pagine di letteratura e realtà, 1999
- L'ultima casa prima del bosco, 2003
- L'inizio è in autunno, 2008
