= Rosetta Loy =

Italian writer (1931–2022)

Rosetta Loy (15 May 1931 – 1 October 2022) was an Italian writer. She was the recipient of the Rapallo Carige Prize for Le strade di polvere (The Dusty Roads) in 1988.

== Biography ==
Born Rosetta Provera, she was the youngest of four children of a Piedmontese father and a mother from Rome. She wrote her first story at the age of nine, but her real literary vocation manifested itself towards the age of twenty-five. However, she had to wait until 1974 for her first publication, The Bicycle.

In 1992, Loy temporarily left Einaudi, with which she had published her most acclaimed work four years earlier and published the semi-autobiographical novel Sogni d'inverno for Mondadori.

== Personal life and death ==
She was married for thirty years to Beppe Loy, with whom she had four children.

She died of a heart attack at her home in Rome, aged 91. She was buried in the cemetery of Mirabello Monferrato, the Piedmontese town where The Dusty Roads was set and where her father's house is still located.

== Works ==
- La bicicletta, Turin, Einaudi, 1974.
- La porta dell'acqua, Turin, Einaudi, 1976.
- L'estate di Letuche, Milan, Rizzoli, 1982.
- All'insaputa della notte, Milan, Garzanti, 1984.
- Le strade di polvere, Turin, Einaudi, 1987.
- Sogni d'inverno, Milan, Mondadori, 1992.
- Cioccolata da Hanselmann, Milan, Rizzoli, 1995.
- La parola ebreo, Turin, Einaudi, 1997. (First Words: A Childhood in Fascist Italy, translated into English by Gregory Conti, New York: Metropolitan Books/Henry Holt, 2000)
- Ahi, Paloma, Turin, Einaudi, 2000.
- Nero è l'albero dei ricordi, azzurra l'aria, Turin, Einaudi, 2004.
- La prima mano, Milan, Rizzoli, 2009;
- Cuori infranti, Rome, Nottetempo 2010;
- Gli anni fra cane e lupo. 1969–1994. Il racconto dell'Italia ferita a morte, Milan, Chiarelettere, 2013;
- Forse, Turin, Einaudi, 2016;
- Cesare, Turin, Einaudi, 2018, ISBN 978-88-06-23850-6.
