= Luciano Mecacci =

Italian psychologist

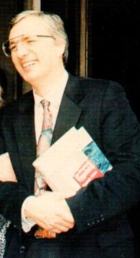
- Born: November 27, 1946 (age 79); Livorno, Italy
- Education: Sapienza University of Rome
- Awards: Viareggio Prize
- Scientific career
- Fields: Psychophysiology, History of psychology
- Workplaces: Sapienza University of Rome; University of Florence

Luciano Mecacci (born November 27, 1946) is an Italian psychologist and author, formerly Professor at the University of Florence, best known for his contributions to history of psychology in Italy, and as an influential early disseminator of works and ideas of Lev Vygotsky in the West. He won the Viareggio Prize in 2014.

== Career ==
After working at the Institute of Psychology of the National Research Council in Rome, and teaching as an associate and full professor at the University of Rome La Sapienza, Mecacci moved to the University of Florence in 1995, where he was also Vice Rector from 1998 to 2006. Starting in the early 1970s, he was a fellow of the Institute of General and Pedagogical Psychology in Moscow and the Institute of Psychology (USSR Academy of Sciences), and in the early 1980s he worked at the Laboratory of Experimental Psychology in Paris (CNRS).

His main works regard the psychophysiological correlates of cognitive processes, and the history of psychology, especially Russian. His first book on Soviet psychology and neurophysiology had the preface by Aleksandr Luria; While in Moscow, Mecacci had studied neuropsychology with Luria, whom he identifies as his "fundamental figure". Mecacci edited the first unabridged Western translation of the book Thinking and Speech by Lev Vygotsky. His work as an intermediary between Russia and Western Europe has been an important influence on the reception of Vygotsky's ideas in the West during the Cold War. In the 1980s, he led the periodical Storia e critica della psicologia (History and criticism of psychology). As historical studies within psychology became increasingly taught in Italy in the early 1990s, he was active in the development of the field, most notably by writing new handbooks, and is considered "one of the senior members of the history of psychology in Italy".

From the 2010s and onward, he has been researching and writing literature about specific topics in Italian and Russian histories. In 2014, he won the Viareggio Prize in the non-fiction category for his book La Ghirlanda fiorentina, about the final days of the Italian philosopher Giovanni Gentile (assassinated in 1944). His 2019 book Besprizornye. Bambini randagi nella Russia sovietica (1917-1935) deals with the history of orphans in the Soviet Union. His books have been translated into English, Dutch, Portuguese, Russian, Spanish and German.

== Professional affiliations ==
Mecacci is a member of the Academia Europaea and of the Editorial Board of the Journal of Russian and East European Psychology, and Culture and Education.

== List of works ==
- Luciano Mecacci, Brain and history: The Relationship between Neurophysiology and Psychology in Soviet Research, preface by A. R. Luria, New York, Brunner/Mazel, 1979. ISBN 978-0-87630-218-7
- Luciano Mecacci, Freudian Slips: The Casualties of Psychoanalysis from the Wolf Man to Marilyn Monroe, An Rudha (Scotland), Vagabond Voices, 2009. ISBN 978-0-9560560-1-6
- Luciano Mecacci, Dante on mind and brain, «Cortex», 138, 2021, pp. 356–364.
- Л. Мекаччи «Некоторые воспоминания о Лурии» // Культурно-историческая психология. 2022, 18 (N° 3). C. 61-63 (Some Reminiscences of Luria).
- Luciano Mecacci, Besprizornye, Bambini randagi nella Russia sovietica (1917-1935), Milano, Adelphi, 2019. ISBN 978-88-459-3398-1 (Russian translation, Izdatelstvo Ivan Limbakh, S. Peterburg, 2023; ISBN 978-5-89059-499-0).
- Артур Кронфельд, Дегенераты у власти, под редакцией Лучано Мекаччи и Александра Эткинда, ЭКСМО, Москва, 2023. ISBN 978-5-04-188773-5 (A. Kronfeld, Degenerates in power, edited by L. Mecacci and A. Etkind).
- Marco Catani and Luciano Mecacci, Inside Soviet neuropsychology: Luciano's Mecacci's personal reflections on Alexander Luria, «Cortex»,183, 2025, pp. 105-111.
- Luciano Mecacci, Lo psicologo nel Palazzo. Il caso Bechterev-Stalin, Venezia, Palingenia, 2024. ISBN 979-12-81-7650-23 (Russian translation, Uberbau, Riga, 2025; ISBN 978-9-93438-497-4).
