= Carlo Dionisotti =

Italian literary critic, philologist and essayist

Carlo Dionisotti (Italian pronunciation: [ˈkarlo di.oniˈzɔtti, - djo-]; 9 June 1908 in Turin – 22 February 1998 in London) was an Italian literary critic, philologist and essayist. An alumnus of Turin University and a lifelong friend of Arnaldo Momigliano, he shortly lectured at Oxford before moving to Bedford College, London, where he held the post of Professor of Italian from 1949 to 1970.

His most significant work, Geografia e storia della letteratura italiana (1967), is a collection of essays contesting Francesco De Sanctis' unitary perspective on the development of Italian literature and pointing out instead how local influences shaped the production of major Italian authors.

== Awards and honours ==
- Member of Accademia dei Lincei, from 1964
- Fellow of the British Academy, from 1972
- Feltrinelli Prize, 1982
- Viareggio Prize, 1989, for the essay Appunti sui moderni. Foscolo, Leopardi, Manzoni e altri
