= Giuliana Morandini =

Italian writer (1938–2019)

Giuliana Morandini (1938 – 22 July 2019) was an Italian writer.

She was born in Pavia di Udine and lived in Rome and Venezia. Her first book E allora mi hanno rinchiusa: testimonianze dal manicomio femminile (And so I was locked up: Testimony from a Women's Mental Hospital) (1977) was a study of women in Italian mental hospitals; it was a finalist for the Viareggio Prize. Her first novel I cristalli di Vienna was published in 1978 and received the Prato Prize; it was translated into English as Bloodstains. This was followed by Caffè Specchi (The Café of Mirrors) in 1983, which received the Viareggio Prize. Her 1987 novel Angelo a Berlino (Angel in Berlin) was a finalist for the Premio Campiello.

In 1980, she published La voce che è in lei (The voice within her), an anthology of writing by little-known or forgotten Italian women authors. She also wrote an introduction for Italian translations of Samuel Beckett.

== Selected works ==
- Ricercare Carlotta, children's book (1979)
- Poesie d'amore (Love poems), collected poetry by women (1986)
- Sogno a Herrenberg (Dreams in Herrenberg), historical novel (1991)
- Giocando a dama con la luna (Playing checkers with the moon), historical novel (1996)
