= Attilio Bertolucci =

Italian poet and writer (1911–2000)

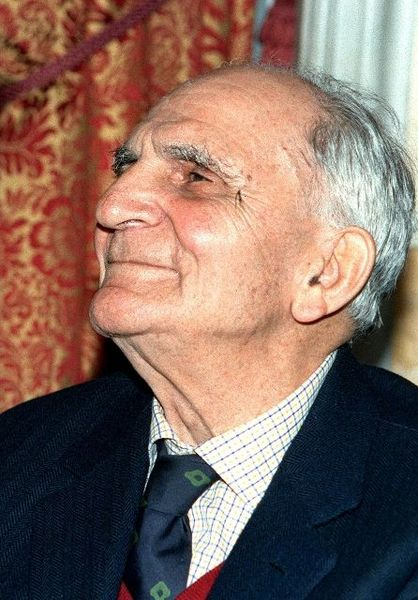
- Born: 18 November 1911; Parma, Kingdom of Italy
- Died: 14 June 2000 (aged 88); Rome, Italy
- Education: University of Bologna
- Occupation: Poet
- Spouse: Evelina Giovanardi (m. 1938)
- Children: Bernardo Bertolucci; Giuseppe Bertolucci
- Writing career
- Years active: 1929–2000

Attilio Bertolucci (18 November 1911 – 14 June 2000) was an Italian poet and writer. He was the father of film directors Bernardo and Giuseppe Bertolucci.

== Biography ==
Bertolucci was born at San Lazzaro (province of Parma), to a family of agricultural bourgeoisie.

He began to write poems very early. In 1928, he collaborated with the Gazzetta di Parma, where his friend Cesare Zavattini was editor-in-chief. The following year, Bertolucci published his first poetical collection, Sirio.

In 1931, he started studying law at the University of Parma, which however he left soon afterwards in favour of artistic and literary studies. In the following year, his work Fuochi di Novembre gained him the praise of Italian poets such as Eugenio Montale.

In 1951, he moved to Rome. His marriage to Ninetta Giovanardi had given him two sons, Bernardo (1941–2018) and Giuseppe (1947–2012), both future film directors. In 1951, he also published La capanna indiana and won the Viareggio Prize for literature. In this period, he cemented a friendship with Pier Paolo Pasolini.

Viaggio d'inverno ("Winter Voyage") of 1971 is one of Bertolucci's finest works. This work saw a noteworthy change of style in Bertolucci's poetry: while the first works were, according to Franco Fortini, characterized by "the choice of a humble language for pastoral situations", Viaggio d'inverno was more complex and was marked by an unsureness of feelings. From 1975, together with Enzo Siciliano and Alberto Moravia, he directed the literary review Nuovi Argomenti. He won another Viareggio Prize for the narrative poem Camera da letto (1984–1988).

His last work was La lucertola di Casarola (1997), a collection of works from his youth and other unpublished poems.

Bertolucci died in Rome on 14 June 2000.

Selections of his poetry have been translated into English by Charles Tomlinson and Allen Prowle.

== Bibliography ==
- Sirio (1929)
- Fuochi di novembre (1932)
- La capanna indiana (1951)
- The bedroom (La camera da letto, 1988, English translation by Luigi Bonaffini); ISBN 9780982384930
- Viaggio d'inverno (1971)
- La camera da letto (2 vols., 1984–1988, poem-novel)
- Aritmie (1991, essays)
- Verso le sorgenti del cinghio (1993)
- Una lunga amicizia (1994, letters)
- La lucertola di Casarola (1997)
- Sunshine and Shadows (2010, English translations by Allen Prowle)

== Honour ==
- Italy: Knight Grand Cross of the Order of Merit of the Italian Republic (2 May 1996)
