= Einaudi =

Einaudi is an Italian surname. Notable people with the surname include:

- Luigi Einaudi (1874–1961), Italian politician
- Mario Einaudi (1904–1994), Italian political scientist, son of Luigi
- Giulio Einaudi (1912–1999), Italian publisher, son of Luigi and father of Ludovico
- Giulio Einaudi (prelate) (1928–2017), Italian Roman Catholic archbishop and diplomat, Apostolic Nuncio
- Luigi R. Einaudi (born 1936), American diplomat
- Ludovico Einaudi (born 1955), Italian pianist and composer, son of the publisher Giulio

== See also ==
- Einaudi Institute for Economics and Finance, in Rome
- Reinaudi (disambiguation)
