= Raiziss and de Palchi Translation Awards =

The Raiziss and de Palchi Translation Awards was established in 1995 through a bequest to The New York Community Trust by Sonia Raiziss Giop, a poet, translator, and editor of Chelsea.

The awards recognize translations into English of modern Italian poetry through a $10,000 book prize or a $25,000 fellowship with residency at the American Academy in Rome.

== Awards ==
Year & Award	Translator	Book	Judges
2021 Book Prize	Paula Bohince	Selected poems by Corrado Govoni	Moira Egan, Rebecca Falkoff, Graziella Sidoli
2020 Book Prize	Geoffrey Brock	Last Dream by Giovanni Pascoli	Maria Esposito Frank, Giorgio Mobili, and Michael Palma
2019 Book Prize	Will Schutt	Selected Poems by Fabio Pusterla	Maria Esposito Frank, Giorgio Mobili, Michael Palma
2018 Book Prize	Anthony Molino	The Diary of Kaspar Hauser by Paolo Febbraro	Maria Luisa Ardizzone, Giorgio Mobili, Michael Palma
2017 Fellowship	Thomas E. Peterson	Selected Poems by Franco Fortini	Maria Luisa Ardizzone, Antonello Borra, Alessandro Carrera
2016 Book Prize	Stephen Sartarelli	The Selected Poetry of Pier Paolo Pasolini	Adria Bernardi, Antonello Borra, Alessandro Carrera
2015 Fellowship	Todd Portnowitz	Go Tell It to the Emperor: Selected Poems by Pierluigi Cappello	Adria Bernardi, Luigi Fontanella, Giuseppe Leporace
2014 Book Prize	Luigi Bonaffini	The Bedroom by Attilio Bertolucci	Barbara Carle, Luigi Fontanella, Giuseppe Leporace
2013 Fellowship	John Taylor	Selected Poems by Lorenzo Calogero	Barbara Carle, Victoria Surliuga, Anthony Julian Tamburri
2012 Book Prize	Jennifer Scappettone	Locomotrix: Selected Poetry and Prose by Amelia Rosselli	Geoffrey Brock, Victoria Surliuga, Anthony Julian Tamburri
2011 Fellowship	Dominic Siracusa	Oramai by Emilio Villa	Thomas Harrison, Jane Tylus, Paolo Valesio
2010 Book Prize	Paul Vangelisti	The Position of Things: Collected Poems 1961–1992 by Adriano Spatola	Jennifer Scappettone, Paolo Valesio, Lawrence Venuti
2009 Fellowship	None	The judges did not award a fellowship this year	Sarah Arvio, Emanuel di Pasquale, Michael F. Moore
2008 Book Prize	Patrick Barron	The Selected Poetry and Prose of Andrea Zanzotto	Eamon Grennan, Michael F. Moore, Emanuel di Pasquale
2007 Fellowship	Adria Bernardi	Small Talk by Raffaello Baldini	Geoffrey Brock, Eamon Grennan, Stephen Sartarelli
2006 Book Prize	John DuVal	Tales of Trilussa by Carlo Alberto Salustri	Geoffrey Brock, Charles Martin, Michael Palma
2005 Fellowship	Ann Snodgrass	Selected Poems of Vittorio Sereni	Phillis Levin, Charles Martin, Michael Palma
2004 Book Prize	Andrew Frisardi	Selected Poems by Giuseppe Ungaretti	Phillis Levin, Rosanna Warren
2003 Fellowship	Michael Palma	Selected Poems of Giovanni Raboni	Alfredo de Palchi, Dana Gioia, Rosanna Warren
2002 Book Prize	Stephen Sartarelli	Songbook: The Selected Poems of Umberto Saba	Alfredo de Palchi, Dana Gioia, Charles Wright
2001 Fellowship	Emanuel di Pasquale	Sharing a Trip: Selected Poems by Silvio Ramat	Alfredo de Palchi, Paolo Valesio, Charles Wright
2000 Book Prize	John P. Welle and Ruth Feldman	Peasants Wake for Fellini's Casanova by Andrea Zanzotto	Alfredo de Palchi, Jonathan Galassi, Paolo Valesio
1999 Fellowship	Geoffrey Brock	Disaffections: Complete Poems 1930–1950 by Cesare Pavese	Alfredo de Palchi, Jonathan Galassi, William Jay Smith
1998 Book Prize	Michael Palma	The Man I Pretend to Be: The Colloquies and Selected Poems of Guido Gozzano	Alfredo de Palchi, Jonathan Galassi, William Jay Smith
1997 Fellowship	Anthony Molino	Esercizi di tiptologia by Valerio Magrelli	Alfredo de Palchi, Jonathan Galassi, Rosanna Warren
1996 Book Prize	W. S. Di Piero	This Strange Joy: Selected Poems of Sandro Penna	Alfredo de Palchi, Jonathan Galassi, Rosanna Warren
