= Gian Maria Annovi =

Italian poet, essayist, and professor

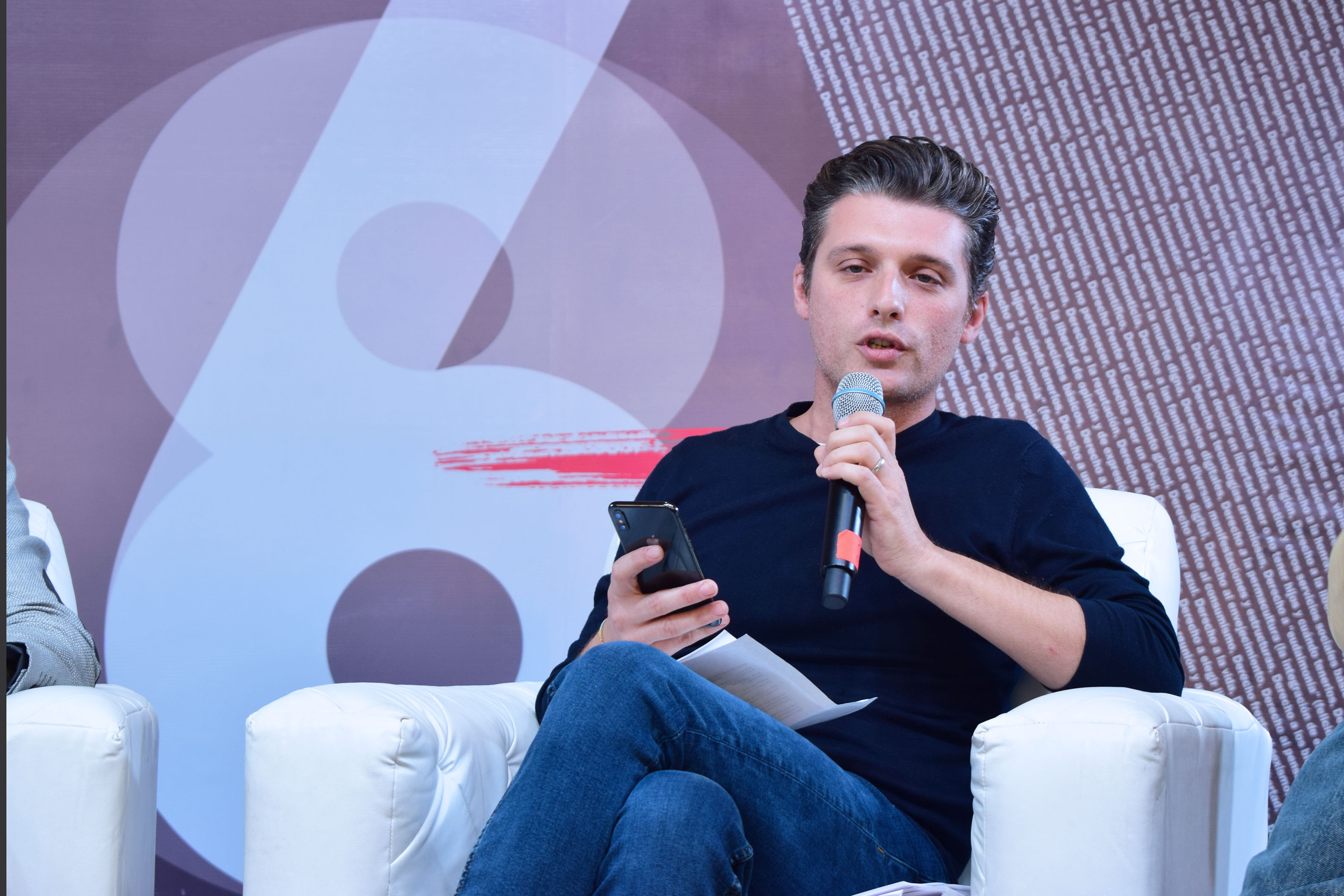
- Born: February 1, 1978 (age 48)
- Occupations: Poet, critic, scholar
- Writing career
- Period: 1998 - present

Gian Maria Annovi (born February 1, 1978) is an Italian poet, essayist, and professor. He has published five collections of poetry, along with appearing in various literary journals, and anthologies. He is currently an Associate Professor of Italian and Comparative Literature at the University of Southern California.

== Life and work ==
Gian Maria Annovi was born and raised in Italy. He studied Philosophy at the University of Bologna where he graduated with a dissertation on Giacomo Leopardi and Andrea Zanzotto (Special Mention, Giacomo Leopardi Prize). He then pursued graduate research in the field of Contemporary Italian Literature under the direction of Niva Lorenzini at the University of Bologna. After studying abroad at the Universitat de Barcelona, Spain, and at the University of California Los Angeles, Annovi attended Columbia University and pursued a Ph.D. in Italian Studies under the direction of Paolo Valesio. In 2011, his Ph.D. dissertation on writer and filmmaker Pier Paolo Pasolini received the ‘Pier Paolo Pasolini Award for Best Doctoral Dissertation’. He taught at the University of Denver from 2011 to 2013 before joining USC.

As a scholar, Annovi has published a book on the relationship between subjectivity and corporeality in the poetry of Italian authors such as Rosselli, Zanzotto, Sanguineti, Porta, Spatola, and Pasolini. In 2017, his second book, Pier Paolo Pasolini: Performing Authorship, received the XVI International Flaiano Prize for Italian Studies, and the Howard R. Marraro Prize for Italian Studies from the Modern Languages Association. He is the editor of four volumes and the author of numerous book chapters and articles on Italian poetry, the Italian Neo-avant-garde, and Pier Paolo Pasolini. In 2015 he received a Creative Capital | The Andy Warhol Foundation Arts Writers Grant.

He debuted as a poet at age twenty with a collection of poems entitled Denkmal (1998). His second collection, Terza persona cortese (2007), received the Premio Mazzacurati-Russo. In 2010, he published the bilingual collection Kamikaze e altre persone, with an introduction by Antonella Anedda, and an original EP by Joseph Keckler. In 2013, La scolta received the Premio Marazza. The same year, Annovi won the Immaginare Poesia Prize and Elena Baucke realized a short film based on one of his poems. In 2024, his book Discomparse was a finalist for the Strega Prize for Poetry. His work has been included in various anthologies and has been translated into English, French, and Spanish.

In 2017, New York-based Italian composer, Roberto Scarcella Perino realized a madrigal for women’s choir and mezzo based on La scolta.

== Bibliography ==
- Denkmal (1998). Edizioni L'Obliquo.
- Self-Eaters (2007). Emilio Mazzoli Editore.
- Terza persona cortese (2007). Edizioni d'if.
- Altri corpi. Poesia e corporalità negli anni sessanta (2008). Gedit Edizioni.
- Kamikaze e altre persone (2010). Transeuropa Edizioni.
- Antonio Porta, Piercing the Page. Selected Poems 1959-1989. With an essay by Umberto Eco. Edited by Gian Maria Annovi. (2012) Otis Books.
- Fratello selvaggio: Pier Paolo Pasolini tra gioventù e nuova gioventù. Edited by Gian Maria Annovi (2013). Transeuropa Edizioni.
- Italics (2013). Aragno Editore.
- La scolta (2013). Nottetempo.
- Amelia Rosselli. Impromptu. A Trilingual Translation. Edited by Gian Maria Annovi. (2014). Guernica Editions.
- Anna Maria Ortese: Celestial Geographies. Edited by Gian Maria Annovi and Flora Ghezzo. (2015). University of Toronto Press.
- Pier Paolo Pasolini: Performing Authorship (2017). Columbia University Press.
- Persona presente con passato imperfetto (2018). Lietocolle.
- Discomparse (2023). Aragno Editore.
