= Barbara Carle =

American poet

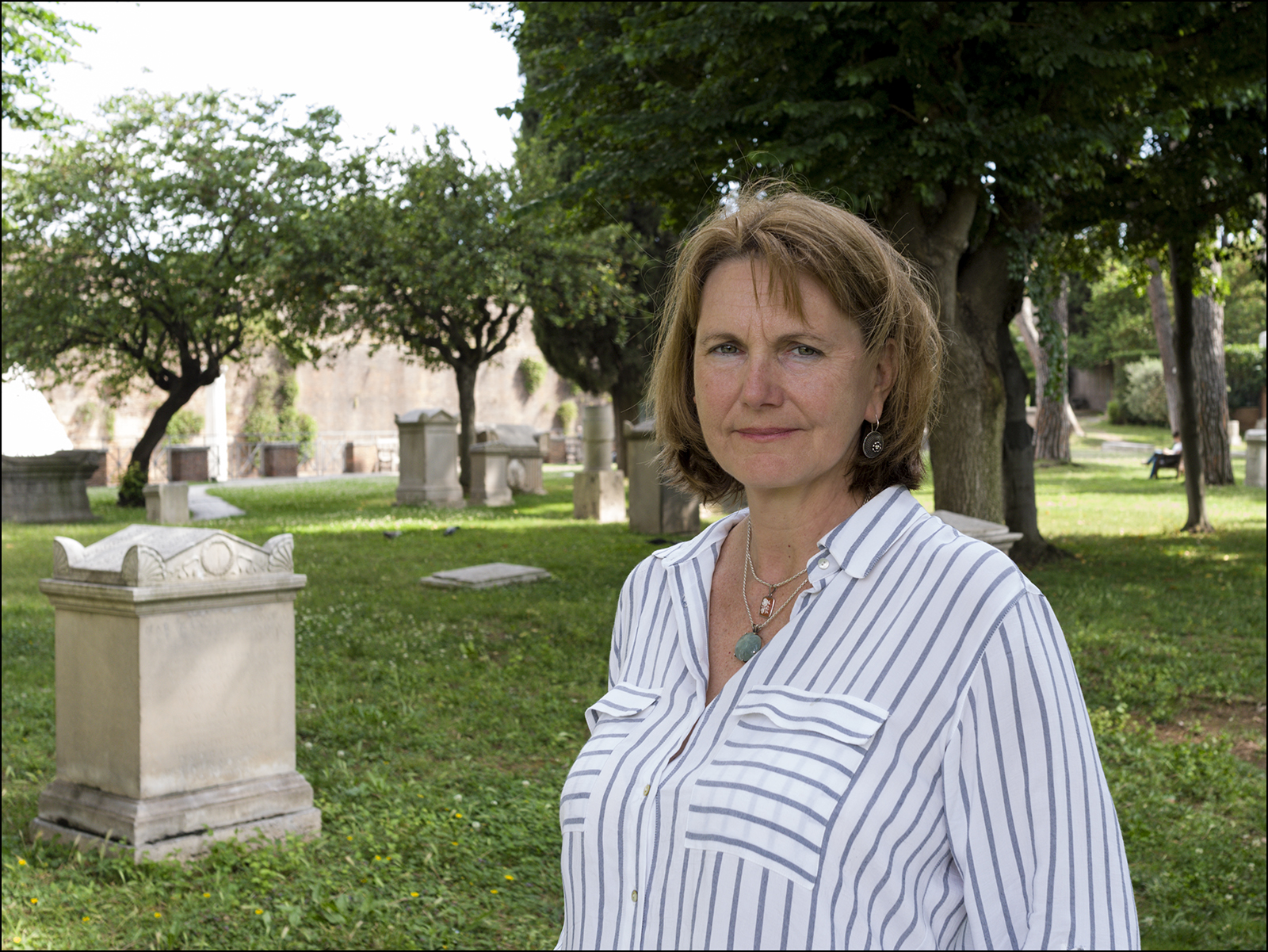
- Born: Peshawar, Pakistan
- Education: PhD. Columbia University
- Occupations: Poet, translator, critic, professor of Italian
- Writing career
- Language: English, Italian, French
- Notable works: Veemenze (2024); Vestigia (2023); Don't Waste My Beauty/Non guastare la mia bellezza (2006); New Life/Nuova Vita (2006); Tangible Remains/Toccare quello che resta (2009); Sulle orme di Circe (2016); Gattizie (2018); Touching What Remains /Toccare quello che resta (2021)
- Notable awards: National Frascati prize for Poetry (Foreign Section Italo Alighiero Chiusano) (2000); Premio Civetta di Minerva (2011); XI Edizione del Concorso Nazionale di Poesia a Coreno Ausonio "Per non dimenticare"(2022)
- Literary movement: Modernism, postmodernism

Barbara Carle is a French-American poet, critic, translator and Italianist. She is Professor Emerita of Italian at California State University Sacramento.

== Writing ==
Carle has published several books of poetry in the U.S. and Italy. Most of her books are bilingual (English/Italian). She has also translated books of poetry by contemporary Italian poets, such as Rodolfo Di Biasio, Gianfranco Palmery, Alfredo di Palchi, Marco Vitale. She authored numerous articles on Italian and French poetry, and prefaced various volumes of translation. Her work appeared in various European anthologies.

== Biography ==
Born to American and French parents in Peshawar, Pakistan, Carle spent most her childhood and adolescence abroad (Pakistan, Colombia, India, Bangladesh, Iran, Thailand, Libya, France, Italy) as she grew up in a diplomatic family. She obtained a doctorate in Italian Literature with specializations in French and Comparative Literature at Columbia University, New York City in 1988. Her dissertation was on Giuseppe Ungaretti and Paul Valéry.

== Creative works ==
Veemenze, Marietti1820, Bologna, November 2024, 198 pp., Preface Viaggio nell'interno by Paolo Valesio Paolo Valesio, p. 9-19.

Vestigia, Poesie in italiano e inglese, Caramanica Editore, March 2023,152 pp.

Touching What Remains/Toccare quello che resta, Poesie in inglese e in italiano, Seconda edizione, Ghenomena Poesia 9, 2021, 150 pp., with an updated postface by Domenico Adriano.

Sulle orme di Circe Incontri a Formia Ghenomena Edizioni, May 2016.

Tangible Remains/Toccare quello che resta Ghenomena Edizioni, May 2009.

New Life/ Nuova vita, Gradiva Publications, SUNY at Stony Brook, New York, May 2006 (Poetry and prose). This book was selected in the Recommended Reading section in Chelsea 82/83 2007 : 292–293.

Don't Waste My Beauty/ Non guastare la mia bellezza (bilingual collection of Poetry), Caramanica (Italy), July 2006, National Frascati Prize, Foreign Section “Italo Alighiero Chiusano,” 2000, pp. 104.

== About Vestigia (Caramanica, 2023) ==
This bilingual book includes a selection of poems published in various American and Italian literary journals between 1983 and 2022. Some poems are in Italian only. All bilingual poems result from continuous rewriting of English and Italian versions: there is no original nor dominant language in this process. Section II, entitled Shipwreck-Naufragio includes a long narrative poem Voices of the Northener 1860 (originally published in Journal of Italian Translation, 2014). It was also published as an art book with engravings by André Beuchat, Atelier Alma Charta, Parma, 2019.

== About Touching What Remains/Toccare quello che resta (Ghenomena, 2021) ==
This new edition of Tangible Remains/Toccare quello che resta (2009) includes a revised selection of the original sequence. Most of the poems have been rewritten in both languages. The book is entirely reorganized. It includes new poems (such as "Window I/Finestra I", "Clepsydra"/"La clessidra"). Seven poems from the first edition have been excluded from this new collection. However, they have been moved to the Appendix, which also includes a new poem entitled "The Rag"/"Lo straccio".

== Art books ==
La ladra, poem with one original engraving by André Beuchat, I quaderni della notte, 9, Atelier Alma Charta, Parma, 2020.

Voices from the Northerner, with original etchings by André Beuchat, Atelier Alma Charta], Parma, Italia, 2019.

Gattizie, with one original etching by the author and five new poems in French, Italian, and English. Cover etching and book fabrication by Luciano Ragozzino, Il ragazzo innocuo Press, Milan (Italy), November, 2018.

Chi può dirtelo amore Tutto il segno Can anyone find words my love to express the sign, by Marco Vitale and B. Carle, with an original etching by André Beuchat, L’Atelier ALMA CHARTA, Toccalmatto, Italy, February, 2018 (limited edition).

== Short selection of poems published in journals and anthologies ==
"L'aquilone dalla coda di neve" (Stampa su alluminio), Sentinella a che punto è la notte? un'opera di opere, alla chiara fonte, Fondazione MAGIS, Lugano, 2023, p. 40.

"Invettiva mancata, Piccolo omaggio a Dante Alighieri / Failed Invective, A Little Homage to Dante Alighieri" in Pianeta Poesia, Accademia Mondiale della Poesia, numero 3, marzo, 2021: 6–7.

"La ladra", "Still LIfe with Teapot", "Il bricco avventuriero", "Elevata tra due cerchi", Gradiva, International Journal of Italian Poetry, Number 58, Fall 2020: 21–24

"Dicesi amore", poesie di Barbara Carle, New Poems, Incroci, Fall, 2020, semestrale di letteratura e altre scritture anno XXI, numero 41 gennaio-giugno 2020: 7–14.

“L'ultimo nume verde”, ”Le colonne tortilli di San Matteo”, edited by Flavia Pankiewicz, Luoghi Interiori, Città di Castello, 2020.

“Il mare bianco, The White Sea” in Maremare, Antologia Poetica Mediterranea, Anthology of Mediterranean Poets, Ed. by Lino Angiuli, Maria Rosaria Cesareo, Milica Marinkovic’, Adda Editore, June, 2017, pp. 116–117.

“Gli spazzini di Roma” in Novecento non più – Verso il realismo terminale, anthology of poetry, ed. by Salvatore Contessini and Diana Battaggia, with Introduction by Guido Oldani, La Vita Felice, Milano, November 2016, p. 81.

“Lorenzo Lotto: L’annunciata di Recanati,” “Cortilofilia 3” in “Sulla diaspora della poesia italiana,” Poesia 310, December, 2015, International Monthly Magazine of Poetry, Milano, Italy: 55–56.

“The Pharos of Dover/ Il faro di Dover” in Luoghi d’Europa Antologia poetica internazionale, ed. by Lino Angiuli, Diana Battaggia, La Vita Felice, 2015: 58–63.

“I. Bici II. Vélo Love” in Parole in Bicicletta, Bicicletterario 2015, Caramanica, Italy, 2015: 12–13.

“Voices From the Northerner 1860/ Voci dalla Northerner 1860,” Narrative Poem in English and in Italian with an introduction, Journal of Italian Translation, Vol. IX, Numbers 1 & 2, Spring and Fall, 2014: 152–171

“Dialogue at the Cestian Field in Rome/ Dialogo al campo Cestio di Roma,” Italian Poetry Review, 2013, VIII (Publication: October 2014) (a peer-reviewed multilingual journal of creative writing and criticism, New York City): 132–137.

“The Grains of Sand,” Chelsea 72 (New York City, September 2002):125, “Your Shell Which Wakes,” Chelsea 72: 126 “Downpour Over the Forest,” Chelsea 72: 127 “During My Bengali Adolescence,” Chelsea 72: 128 “Love Keeps Disquieting Me,” Chelsea 72: 129, “Unmake the Silence,” Chelsea 72:130, “They Breathe, They Listen,” Chelsea 72:131

“Pencil,” Connecticut River Review, Vol. 12/1 (The Connecticut Poetry Society, Fall/Winter 1990): 13.

== Interviews with Carle on her creative works ==
Erinda Islami intervista Barbara Carle, Insula europea, September, 2017 Erinda Islami intervista Barbara Carle

Video Interview by Federica Velonà, Rai Letteratura, June, 2017

Interview by Marco Vitale with Barbara Carle on Sulle orme di Circe on Insula europea Website (sponsored by the University of Perugia) Sulle orme di Circe. Marco Vitale intervista Barbara Carle

== Anthologies and translations with critical introductions ==
Poesie vegetali Green Poems by Lino Angiuli. Introductory notes by Loredana Capone and Maria Rosaria Cesareo. Translator's preface and translation by Barbara Carle. Poems selected by Maria Rosaria Cesareo and Barbara Carle. Consiglio regionale della Puglia, Edizioni di Pagina, Bari, 2021.

Emblems of Sleep and Other Poems, by Marco Vitale, Gradiva Publications

Tra il cielo e la terra/ Between Heaven and Earth: Poesie in cinese classico, inglese e italiano/ Poems in the Classical Chinese, English and Italian, Trilingual Anthology of Classical Chinese Poetry (with Curtis Dean Smith), La Vita Felice Milano, June 2017, pp. 220. Second revised edition, June 2019

November, by Domenico Cipriano with critical introduction, Gradiva Publications, Stony Brook, New York, 2015.

Garden of Delights, Selected Poems by Gianfranco Palmery, with a critical introduction, Gradiva Publications, SUNY at Stony Brook, New York, May 2010.

Altre contingenze Other Contingencies: Poetry Anthology by Rodolfo Di Biasio, translation with a critical postface, Gradiva Publications, New York/ Caramanica Editore (Italy), May 2002, pp. 300.

Patmos by Rodolfo Di Biasio. Editor of bilingual Italian/English volume, translation with critical introduction, Gradiva Publications, May 1998.

== Translation of books (poetry and fiction) ==
Niobe (poetic tale) by Rodolfo Di Biasio, first bilingual edition, Ghenomena, 2022, pp. 60.

Per una gentile compagna di viaggio, Dodici omaggi a Nancy Watkins tradotti da Barbara Carle, May 2017, Fàmmera Edizioni, pp. 44.

Liturgia familiare Family Liturgy, translation of a book of poetry by Tommaso Lisi, Edizioni Il Labirinto, Rome (Italy), May, 2015, pp 76.

Laudes creaturarum (Cantico di Frate Sole by San Francesco d’Assisi), translation in English, Sol Invictus Press, Special Edition (Vandercook Press), Drawings by Stefan C. Arteni, Design by Myriam S.P. De Arteni, New York, 1992.

== Translation of poetry into English and French ==
New English Translation of La ginestra, poem by Giacomo Leopardi in Journal of Italian Translation, Volume XIV, No.1, Spring, 2019: 84-101.

Bambina mattina by Domenico Adriano, co-translation (with Michel Sirvent) of poetry into English and French, Ghenomena Editions (Italy), August 2013 (Rare limited edition), pp. 82.

Patmos by Rodolfo Di Biasio, a new edition with revised co-translation (with Michel Sirvent) into English and French, Ghenomena Editions (Italy), August 2013 (Rare limited edition), pp. 82.

== Interview on translation ==
Interview – Review “Tradurre non è tradire:” Rodolfo Di Biasio interviews Marco Vitale and Barbara Carle in America Oggi Magazine, September 6, 2020: 7.

== Translation of poetry into Italian ==
Carle regularly contributes to Journal of Italian Translation (JIT) with translations from English into Italian. She has translated poems by Ralph Waldo Emerson, Greg Delaney, T. S. Eliot, Rachel Hadas, and Marianne Moore into Italian. She has also contributed many translations of contemporary and modern Italian poets into English, several translated into English for the first time, such as Lucio Zinna and Marco Vitale.

"La nuvola, Traduzione di Percy Bisshe Shelley, The Cloud", in L'anello che non tiene, Vols. 27–28, n. 1–2, Spring-Fall 2015–2016 (published in 2021): 83–89.

== A short selection of critical articles on poetry and translation ==
"L'ariosa riscrittura di P. B. Shelley – Nota sulla traduzione per 'The Cloud- La nuvola'" in L'anello che non tiene, Vols. 27–28, nn. 1–2, Spring-Fall 2015–2016 (published in 2021): 76-82

An Introduction to Paolo Valesio's Esploratrici solitarie through Twelve Poems, translations with critical commentary and introduction, Italica, Volume 97, No. 2, Summer, 2020, p. 397-412.

“Il ritorno e la ripresa nell’opera di Rodolfo di Biasio” in I poeti del centro Italia, Volume primo, ed. by Bonifacio Vincenzi, Francavilla Marittima, Macabor Editore, January, 2019: 33–36.

“Under Mario Luzi’s Poetic Spell,” Introductory essay to Luigi Bonaffini's translation of Under Human Species by Mario Luzi, Legas, New York, 2018: 7–19.

“Su Garden of Delights by Gianfranco Palmery: Introduzione e Postfazione,” Gradiva, International Journal of Italian Poetry, Number 45, Spring 2014: 48–53.

“Dalle zolle perdute alla finestra: l’identità letteraria dei confini in Lina Galli e Graziana Pentich” in Atti del Convegno su L’esodo giuliano dalmata nella letteratura, Trieste, 28 febbraio-1 marzo, 2013 Fabrizio Serra Editore, Pisa, Roma, 2014: 386–393.

"From Petrarch to Gaspara Stampa: On the Wings of the Arabian Phoenix,” Translations of poems by Petrarch and Gaspara Stampa in Journal of Italian Translation, Brooklyn N.Y., Vol. VIII, No. I, Spring 2013: 70-78.

“Viaggio attraverso le rime di Alfonso Gatto: i sonetti,” in a book of essays titled Letteratura e oltre: Studi in onore di Giorgio Baroni, Fabrizio Serra Editore, Pisa, 2012: 68–72.

“The Lexicon of Costellazione anonima: A Paradigmatic Poem” in La potenza della poesia: Alfredo de Palchi, ed. by Roberto Bertoldo Edizioni Dell’Orso, 2008: 51–57.

“Bolaffio e Saba, La consonanza artistica,” in Rivista di letteratura italiana, XXVI, 2–3, 2008: 61–69. This article was quoted two times by Daniele D’Anza, Fondazione CRTrieste (Italy), in his book Vittorio Bolaffio, December 2010: 72 and 277.

“Poiein and Pictura in Alfonso Gatto’s Rime di viaggio per la terra dipinta” (Refereed article), Italica, The Journal of the American Association of Teachers of Italian, Vols. 83–84, Fall/Winter 2006–2007: 489–504.

“The American Editions of Alfredo De Palchi’s Poetry: “The Scorpion’s Dark Dance, Sessions With My Analyst, Anonymous Constellations, Addictive Avversions,” Gradiva, 30, Fall 2006: 12–28.

Critical introductions to the poetry of Antonella Anedda and Gianfranco Palmery in Tre generazioni di poeti italiani. Un’antologia del secondo ‘900 a cura di Francesco De Nicola e Giuliano Manacorda, Caramanica Editore, December 2006: 23-25, 383-395.

On Translating: “From Antoine Berman to Antonia Pozzi”, Binding the Lands Present Day Poets Present Day Poetry, Proceedings of the Third Annual Symposium of IPSA (Italian Poetry Society of America) New York, November 11–13, 1999. Ed. by Alessandro Carrera and Alessandro Vettori, The New Jersey Institute of Italian and Italian American Heritage Studies, Edizioni Cadmo, 2004: 231-236. (REPRINT article was originally published in Polytext).

Dall’antitesi al dialogo: le figure orfiche di Quasimodo,” Essays from the International Symposium on Nobel Prize Poet Salvatore Quasimodo: Nell’antico linguaggio, altri segni: Salvatore Quasimodo poeta e critico in Rivista di Letteratura Italiana, 2003, XXI, 1-2: 97-102.

"Natalia Ginzburg’s Narrative Voci della sera", Quaderni di italianistica, vol. XIV/2, University of Toronto, 1993–94: 239-254.

== Reviews of Barbara Carle's works ==
=== Critical article on recent books ===
Fabio De Santis : "La mistica delle cose", STEVE 65, Edizioni del laboratorio, Modena, Primavera/Estate 2025, 33-37

=== On Veemenze ===
Domenico Vuoto, "Barbara Carle Veemenze", Tecla XXI, 1 maggio 2025 Recensione

Domenico Adriano, "Veemenze L’Opera -Biografia di una vita in poesia A proposito dell’ultima raccolta di Barbara Carle", Treccani Magazine Recensione

Fabio Contu, "Veemenze di Barbara Carle", I limoni, Annuario della Poesia in Italia nel 2024, 165-166

"La raccolta di Veemenze di Barbara Carle - Marietti1820 (Literary blog, anonymous) Recensione

=== On Vestigia ===
Giancarlo Baroni : Vestigia. Poesie in italiano e in inglese, Treccani, 20 giugno 2024, Review/Recensione

Fabio Contu, Vestigia. Poesie in italiano e in inglese. I limoni. Annuario della Poesia in Italia nel 2023, a cura di Francesco De Nicola, Gammarò Edizioni, Sestri Levante, 2024: 182-184.

=== On Sulle orme di Circe ===
Franco Borrelli : Magico Mare Nostrum, America Oggi 7, Weekly Magazine for America Oggi, 8 January 2017.

Marta Lentini in Incroci, XVII, no. 34, luglio-dicembre, 2016: 146-146.

Federica Velonà, Video intervista, Rai Letteratura, giugno, 2017.

Marco Vitale, Sulle orme di Circe, Poesia, Anno XXXI, 337, Maggio/May, 2018: 78-79.

Interview by Marco Vitale : Erinda Islami intervista Barbara Carle, Insula europea (Sponsored by the University of Perugia), settembre 2017.

=== On Tangible Remains/ Toccare quello che resta ===
Benassi, Luca, ND/noidonne, "Toccare quello che resta Essenzialità di forme come accensione e incandescenza", September, 2011.

Robert Bonazzi in World Literature Today, vol. 84, no. 2, March–April 2010: 721–722.

Franco Borrelli in Oggi 7, Magazine domenicale di America Oggi, 20 settembre 2009, "La grandezza del piccolo", America Oggi.

Gina Cafaro in Incroci, luglio dicembre 2009, no. 20: 179.

Francesco Dalessandro in Pagine, agosto-novembre 2009: 46-47 : "Immaginiamo un mondo distrutto, deflagrato; immaginiamo un superstite che s'aggiri, tra le rovine, tra gli oggetti sparsi intorno a sé; immaginiamo che si rivolga a quegli oggetti per ricostruire una memoria possibile della propria vita perduta, e si muova tra di essi affidandosi al tatto, toccandoli, palpandoli, sentendone spigoli o curve, asperità o levigatezza di superfici, la forma intera per ritrovarne memoria in se stesso, alleviando con ciò la propria solitudine. "Anche il tatto ha memoria", dice un verso di Keats. E l'aura che spira in questo libro – tema: gli oggetti "reliquie [...] sopravvissute ai vari crolli delle civiltà". Autrice ne è Barbara Carle, poetessa e traduttrice Americana (al suo attivo versioni da diversi poeti italiani), che da noi si era già messa in luce con un altro libro, Non guastare la mia bellezza (Don't Waste My Beauty, traduzione propria e di Antonella Anedda), pubblicato da Caramanica nel 2006, dopo che nel 2000, aveva vinto il Premio Frascati, 'sezione Italo Alighiero Chiusano'."

Giovanni Occhipinti, "Barbara Carle: La poesia dell’amore e dell’oggetto" in Trasmigrazioni, anno II, n. 2 luglio 2009 2010 (published in 2011), Ragusa, Italy: 92.

Michael Michael Palma in Journal of Italian Translation, 2009, vol. IV, no. 2: 267-271, reprinted in Faithful in My Fashion, Xenos Books/Chelsea, 10/3/2016 :
"As befits a book of objects, Tangible Remains is itself a pleasing object, handsomely printed and designed. Though published in Italy, it is easily available via Internet. Unusual in inspirable and satisfying in execution, it should be read slowly and not all at once, just as you would not tear through a museum giving only the merest glance to each piece on display. And while these pages keep delighting your mind and your ear, you should also keep an eye out for what this always interesting writer will do next".

Simone Pangia in La Provincia (Latina), May 24, 2010, Toccare quello che resta di Barbara Carle pubblicate le poesie, in Rubrica Libri.

Gregory Pell, Tangible Remains/Toccare quello che resta (Poesie in inglese e in italiano), Forum Italicum: A Journal of Italian Studies, September 2009- no. 2, Fall: 535-537 : "This [...] work is equally idiosyncratic and daring."

Giancarlo Pontiggia in Testo, no. 59 anno XXXI gennaio-giugno 2010: 162–163.

Renzo Ricchi in Nuova antologia, May 2010: 367–369.

Rossella Tempesta, Fare Poesia, Rivista di Poesia e Arte Sociale, N. 5 Settembre 2011, p. 127.

Roberto Tortora in TerPress 19 ottobre, 2009 : "La poesia di Barbara Carle. Natura morta in terza persona".

Svetlana Tsiberman, in Sac State Magazine, Fall 2009 (Sacramento State University, California)

Marco Vitale, "Enigmi e rammendi, La poesia angloitaliana di Barbara Carle", succedeoggi, cultura nell'informazione quodidiana, 31 agosto, 2021.

Domenico Vuoto, Le parole delle cose in La poesia e lo spirito, il 7 ottobre, 2021.

Lucio Zinna in Arenaria, Collana di ragguagli di letteratura moderna e contemporarnea, autunno, tre, 2009: 95–96.

=== On Don't Waste my Beauty/ Non guastare la mia bellezza ===
Luigi Fontanella, Gradiva, 31-31, Spring-Fall 2007: 199.

Tiziana Migliaccio, Anthology of National Frascati Prize recipients: La sezione "Italo Alighiero Chiusano: dentro il cuore del Premio Frascati" in "Dall’alto del Gianicolo vedo i castelli romani Poeti a Frascati 1959-2006", Crocetti Editore (Milan, Italy) 2007: 56-57, 171-172. She writes : "La poesia della Carle è vetro impastato con carne e sogni, "la gioia della mia polpa/matura mentre aspetto/ che il tuo morso mieta la mia fertilità"; è un luogo custodito da risorte divinità: Dioniso, le Parche".

=== On New Life/ Nuova Vita ===
Gregory Pell, Journal of Italian Translation, Vol. 1, no. 2, 2006: 310-314.

=== On both Don't Waste my Beauty/ Non guastare la mia bellezza and Tangible Remains/ Toccare quello che resta ===
Giovanni Occhipinti, Barbara Carle: La poesia dell’amore e dell’oggetto in Trasmigrazioni, anno II, n. 2 luglio 2009 2010 (published in 2011), Ragusa, Italy: 92.

Svetlana Tsiberman in Sac State Magazine, Fall 2009.

=== On Patmos (English version, 1998) by Rodolfo Di Biasio ===
Patmos, edited and translated by Barbara Carle, New York, Gradiva Publications, 1998, 53pp. Paper, $10.00 in Collages & Bricolages, n. 13, 2000. Review by Loretta McNaughton

"Perché un poeta ne traduce un altro" by Cinzia Monti,America Oggi Magazine, Oggi 7, domenica 7 marzo, 1999

"Di Biasio approda in USA/Da Patmos ai versi scelti" by Sandro Gionti, Il Messaggero (di Latina), 7 gennaio, 1999

=== On B. Carle's translation (with introductory essay) of Gianfranco Palmery's Garden of Delights ===
Alberto Toni in Avanti (Rome, Italy), 14 October 2010, Arcipelago Libri: 6.

=== On Anthology of Chinese Poetry Tra il cielo/ Between heaven and Earth ===
Thalia Pandiri and Sujane Wu, Metamorphoses, The Journal of the five college faculty seminar on literary translation, Amherst/Northampton, Massachusetts, Vol. 26, Issues 1–2, Spring/Fall 2018: 228–233.

Rob Vollmar, World Literature Today, Nota Bene, Vol. 91, November, 2017.
