= Antonio Porta =

Antonio Porta may refer to:

- Antonio Porta (basketball)
- Antonio Porta (author)
