= Anthony Molino =

American translator & anthropologist (born 1957)

Anthony Molino (born 1957) is an American translator, anthropologist, and psychoanalyst.

== Life ==
Molino has received a Fulbright scholarship to the University of Florence.

Molino's work appeared in Two Lines.

Molino lives in Philadelphia.

== Awards ==
- 1996 Academy of American Poets Raiziss/de Palchi Translation Fellowship
- Fulbright Foundation
- American Academy in Rome
- Pennsylvania Council on the Arts grant
- National Theater Translation Fund grant

== Works ==
=== Translations ===
==== Poetry ====
- Valerio Magrelli (2008). Instructions on how to Read a Newspaper and Other Poems. Chelsea Editions. ISBN 978-0-9725271-7-0.
- Valerio Magrelli (2000). The Contagion of Matter. Holmes & Meier.
- Lucio Mariani (2003). Echoes of Memory: Selected Poems of Lucio Mariani. Translator Anthony Molino. Wesleyan University Press. ISBN 978-0-8195-6496-2. "Anthony Molino."
- Antonio Porta (1992). Melusine: A Ballad and a Diary. Translator Anthony Molino. Guernica Editions. ISBN 978-0-920717-58-5.
- Kisses from Another Dream. (1987).
- Valerio Magrelli (1991). Nearsights: Selected Poems of Valerio Magrelli. Translator Anthony Molino. Graywolf Press. ISBN 978-1-55597-133-5.

==== Stories ====
- Antonio Porta (1998). Dreams & Other Infidelities. Translator Anthony Molino. Xenos Books. ISBN 978-1-879378-37-7.

==== Plays ====
- Eduardo De Filippo (1997). Natale in Casa Cupiello (The Nativity Scene). Translator Anthony Molino, Paul N. Feinberg. Guernica Editions. ISBN 978-0-920717-80-6.
- Manlio Santanelli (1999). Emergency Exit: A Play in 2 Acts. Translator Anthony Molino, Jane House. Xenos Books. ISBN 978-1-879378-40-7.

=== Editor ===
- Culture, subject, psyche: dialogues in psychoanalysis and anthropology. Wesleyan University Press. 2004. ISBN 978-0-8195-6741-3.
- The Couch and the Tree: Dialogues in Psychoanalysis and Buddhism. Lightning Source Inc. 1999. ISBN 978-0-86547-574-8.
- Anthony Molino, Christine Ware, ed. (2001). Where Id Was: Challenging Normalization in Psychoanalysis. Wesleyan University Press. ISBN 978-0-8195-6481-8.
