= Emergency Exit =

Play by Manlio Santanelli

Emergency Exit (1978) is a two-act play by Manlio Santanelli written originally in Italian as Uscita d'emergenza. It was Santanelli's first production in 1980 and made him famous as a playwright.

== Synopsis ==
Two squatters share an abandoned house in Naples. They are both unemployed, previously Cirillo had been a theatre prompter and Pacebbene was a sacristan. The house is in an area deserted after an earthquake and about to collapse.

== Productions ==
Emergency Exit was first produced at the Teatro San Ferdinando in 1980, featuring Nello Mascia and Bruno Cirino. The play was performed in November 2013 at the Piccolo Bellini theatre in Naples, with Rino Di Martino and Ernesto Mahieux playing the two roles.

== Response ==
Eugène Ionesco commented that "Santanelli's work is some of the finest I've seen in years. It is, indeed, extraordinary, intended for audiences who hunger for the rare and the beautiful." The International Daily stated that "in terms of Italian dramaturgy, Emergency Exit could be as much of an influence as Pinter's The Caretaker was in Britain" and La Repubblica viewed it as "a meeting of two exacting theatrical traditions: the grand Neapolitan revival of the commedia dell'arte... and modern-day Europe's cutting-edge, existentialist theater of the grotesque".

The play won awards from the Istituto del Dramma Italiano (IDI) and Associazione Nazionale dei Critici Italiani (ANCI) in Italy.

== Editions ==
- Translated from Italian by Anthony Molino, with Jane House. Grand Terrace, California: Xenos Books. ISBN 1-879378-40-X (paper), xiii + 119 p. [With cover art by Harvey Fry.]
