= Ann Snodgrass =

American poet and translator

- Education: University of Iowa; Johns Hopkins University; University of Utah (PhD)
- Occupations: Poet; translator

Ann Snodgrass is an American poet and translator.

== Life ==
She graduated from the University of Iowa, Johns Hopkins University, and from the University of Utah with a Ph.D.

She lived in the Netherlands, where she taught at Emerson College in Maastricht.

She currently lives in Iowa City, IA, under the pseudonyms "Sample Lady" and "Bagel Lady."

Her work appeared in AGNI, The Harvard Review, American Letters & Commentary, Ploughshares, Paris Review, and TriQuarterly.

== Awards ==
- 2004 Raiziss/de Palchi Fellowship
- Fulbright Foundation
- PEN American Center Renato Poggioli Award
- Massachusetts Arts Lottery grant

== Work ==
=== Poetry ===
- "One Angel: Palazzo Arian, at San Raffaele Arcangelo". Poetry. April 1999.
- No Description of the World. Finishing Line Press. 2007. chapbook
- Portal. Lewiston, New York: Mellen Poetry Press. 2002. ISBN 978-0-7734-3462-2.
- Dividing the Signs: Poems. Dept. of English, University of Utah. 1987.

=== Translations ===
- Luciano Erba (2003). The Hippopotamus. Guernica Press. ISBN 978-1-55071-157-8.
- Antonella Anedda (2008). Three Stations. Guernica Press.

=== Essays ===
- Knowing Noise: The English Poems of Amelia Rosselli. Peter Lang. 2001. ISBN 978-0-8204-5227-2.
