= Franco Buffoni =

Italian poet

- Born: 1948 (age 77–78); Gallarate, Lombardy, Italy
- Occupations: poet, translator, professor
- Known for: professor at Bergamo, Cassino, IULM Milan, Parma, and Turin universities
- Notable work: founded Testo a Fronte
- Awards: Viareggio Prize (2015)

Franco Buffoni (1948) is an Italian poet, translator and professor of literary criticism and comparative literature. He was born in Gallarate (Lombardy) and lives in Rome.

He won the Viareggio Prize for poetry in 2015.

He is editor of the review Testo a Fronte, which he founded in 1989, dedicated to the theory and the practice of literary translation, and editor of the journal Quaderni italiani di poesia contemporanea, published every two years since 1991. He is full professor of literary criticism and comparative literature and has taught for 30 years at the universities of Bergamo, Cassino, IULM Milan, Parma and Turin.

== Selected bibliography ==
=== Poetry ===
- Suora Carmelitana (Guanda, 1997)
- Il Profilo del Rosa (Mondadori, 2000)
- Guerra (Mondadori, 2005)
- Noi e loro (Donzelli, 2008)
- Roma (Guanda, 2009)
- Jucci (Mondadori, 2014 - winner of the Viareggio Prize, 2015)
- Avrei fatto la fine di Turing (Donzelli, 2015)
- Pettorine arancioni e altre poesie (Carteggi Letterari, 2016)

=== Novels ===
- Più luce, padre (luca sossella, 2006)
- Zamel (Marcos y Marcos, 2009)
- Il servo di Byron (Fazi, 2012)
- La casa di via Palestro (Marcos y Marcos, 2014)

Poems by Franco Buffoni have appeared in the following English translations:

- by Geoffrey Brock in Poetry, December 2007, p. 234
- by Michael Palma, Moira Egan, Damiano Abeni and Geoffrey Brock in The FSG Book of Twentieth Century Italian Poetry, 2012, pp. 538–541
- by Jacob Blakesley in Modern Italian Poets, (Univ.Toronto Press, 2014) pp. 193–218
- by Richard Dixon in Canone Inverso, Anthology of Contemporary Italian Literature, (Gradiva Publications, New York, 2014) pp. 189–203; Italian Contemporary Poets: an anthology, (FUIS, 2016) pp. 39–42; Journal of Italian Translation, Volume XI, no.2, fall 2016, pp. 171–195.
- by Justin Vitiello in Italian Contemporary Poets: an anthology, (FUIS, 2016) pp. 43

Translations of his works have also appeared in French, German, Dutch and Spanish.
