= Michael Palma =

American poet and translator (born 1945)

Michael Palma (born 1945 Bronx, New York) is an American poet and translator.

== Life ==
He lives with his wife in Bellows Falls, Vermont. He is on the board of the Italian Poetry Society of America. He has read at the Italian Cultural Institute.

== Awards ==
- 1997 Raiziss/de Palchi Book Prize from the Academy of American Poets.
- Italo Calvino Award from the Translation Center of Columbia University.
- Premio Speciale of the Associazione Culturale Campana of Latina, Italy.
- 2005, 2006, 2007 National Endowment of the Arts grants.

== Works ==
=== Poetry ===
- A Fortune in Gold. Gradiva Publications. 2000. ISBN 978-1-892021-07-6.
- Antibodies. Somers Rocks Press. 1997. ISBN 978-0-9657045-5-7. (chapbook)
- The Egg Shape. Archival Press. 1972. ISBN 0-315-87113-X. (chapbook)

=== Translations ===
- Dante Alighieri (2024). The Divine Comedy. Translator Michael Palma. Liveright Publishing Corporation. ISBN 978-1-324-09554-5.
- Dante Alighieri (2003). Inferno: A New Verse Translation. Translator Michael Palma. W. W. Norton & Company, Incorporated. ISBN 978-0-393-32387-0.
- Franco Buffoni (2002). The Shadow of Mount Rosa. Translator Michael Palma.
- Paolo Valesio (2002). Every Afternoon Can Make the World Stand Still. Translator John Hollander, Michael Palma. Gradiva. ISBN 978-1-892021-16-8.
- Maura Del Serra (2002). Infinite Present. Translator Emanuel Di Pasquale, Michael Palma. Bordighera. ISBN 978-1-884419-52-2.
- Ljuba Merlina Bortolani (2002). The Siege. Translator Michael Palma. BOA Editions, Ltd. ISBN 978-1-929918-28-7.
- Luigi Fontanella (2000). The Transparent Life and Other Poems. Translator Michael Palma. Gradiva Publications. ISBN 978-1-892021-03-8.
- Alfredo de Palchi (1999). Addictive Aversions. Translator Michael Palma. Xenos Books. ISBN 978-1-879378-38-4.
- Armando Patti (1999). The Eye Inside the Wind: Selected Poems of Armando Patti. Translator Michael Palma. Gradiva Publications. ISBN 978-1-892021-02-1.
- Luciano Erba (1998). The Metaphysical Streetcar Conductor: Sixty Poems of Luciano Erba. Translator Alfredo De Palchi, Michael Palma. Gradiva Publications. ISBN 978-1-892021-00-7.
- Sergio Corazzini (1997). Sunday Evening: Selected Poems of Sergio Corazzini. Translator Michael Palma. Gradiva Publications.
- Diego Valeri (1989). My Name on the Wind: Selected Poems of Diego Valeri. Translator Michael Palma. Princeton University Press. ISBN 978-0-691-06776-6.
- Guido Gozzano (1981). The Man I Pretend to Be: The Colloquies and Selected Poems of Guido Gozzano. Translator Michael Palma. Princeton University Press. ISBN 978-0-691-01378-7.

=== Editor ===
- Dana Gioia, Michael Palma, ed. (1991). New Italian Poets. Story Line Press. ISBN 978-0-934257-42-8.

=== Memoir ===
- Bill Henderson, ed. (2003). "And Back Again". Pushcart Prize XXVII: Best of the Small Presses (27 ed.). Pushcart Press. ISBN 978-1-888889-35-2.
