= Addictive Aversions =

Book of erotic and anti-erotic poems by Alfredo de Palchi

Addictive Aversions, by Alfredo de Palchi, is a book of erotic and anti-erotic poems written originally in Italian under the title Le Viziose Avversioni.

== Editions ==
- Addictive Aversions, translated from Italian by Sonia Raiziss and others. Grand Terrace, CA: Xenos Books, (1999). ISBN 1-879378-38-8 (paper), 138 p.
