= Angels of Youth =

Angels of Youth, by Luigi Fontanella, is a book of poems written originally in Italian and based on his Italian volume Ceres.

== Synopsis ==
It is divided into four sections, Ceres, Stanzas for Emma, Ars Poetica, and Ballads.

It includes "Stanzas for Emma" dedicated to the poet's daughter, and "Sequence for my Father" which reflects on his dead parent.

== Publication history ==
Angels of Youth is a translation of Ceres, Fontanella's ninth volume of poetry, originally published in Italian by Caramanica Editore in 1993. The Italian edition won The Orazio Caputo Prize and The Olindo de Gennaro Prize, and received over thirty reviews in prestigious literary journals in Europe and the United States. Devised with American readers in mind, the Xenos Books translation makes subtle modifications in the content, reorganizes the book's structure and adds two new poems.

== Critical response ==
Prof Ken Scambray (University of La Verne) suggested it redefines Italian-American literature by moving away from its stereotypical images, praising its realism and ability to find beauty in the quotidian.

== Editions ==
- Luigi Fontanella. Angels of Youth. Translators Carol Lettieri & Irene Marchegiani Jones. Grand Terrace, California: Xenos Books. p. 170. ISBN 978-1-879378-43-8.
