= Emanuel di Pasquale =

American poet and translator

- Occupations: Poet; translator
- Writing career
- Notable awards: Raiziss and de Palchi Translation Award (2001)

Emanuel di Pasquale is an American poet and translator.

== Life ==
His work has appeared in The Journal of Orgonomy American Poetry Review, Sewanee Review, New York Quarterly, and the New York Times.

He lives in East Brunswick, New Jersey.

== Awards ==
- 2000 Raiziss/de Palchi Translation Awards
- 1998 Bordighera Poetry Prize, Song of the Tulip Tree, by Joe Salerno

== Works ==
=== Poetry ===
- Writing Anew: New and Selected Poems. Bordighera Press. 2007. ISBN 978-1-884419-86-7.
- Cartwheel to the Moon. Chicago: Cricket Books. 2003.
- Genesis: poems. BOA Editions. 1989. ISBN 978-0-918526-66-3.
- The Silver Lake Love Poems. Bordighera Press. 2000.

=== Translations ===
- Silvio Ramat (2001). Sharing a Trip: Selected Poems. Translator Emanuel Di Pasquale. Bordighera. ISBN 978-1-884419-43-0.
- Joe Salerno (1999). Song of the tulip tree. Translator Emanuel Di Pasquale. Bordighera. ISBN 978-1-884419-30-0.

=== Anthologies ===
- Fred Moramarco, Al Zolynas, ed. (1992). Men of Our Time: An Anthology of Male Poetry in Contemporary America. University of Georgia Press. ISBN 978-0-8203-2394-7. "Emanuel di Pasquale."
