= Padma Viswanathan =

Canadian playwright and fiction writer (born 1968)

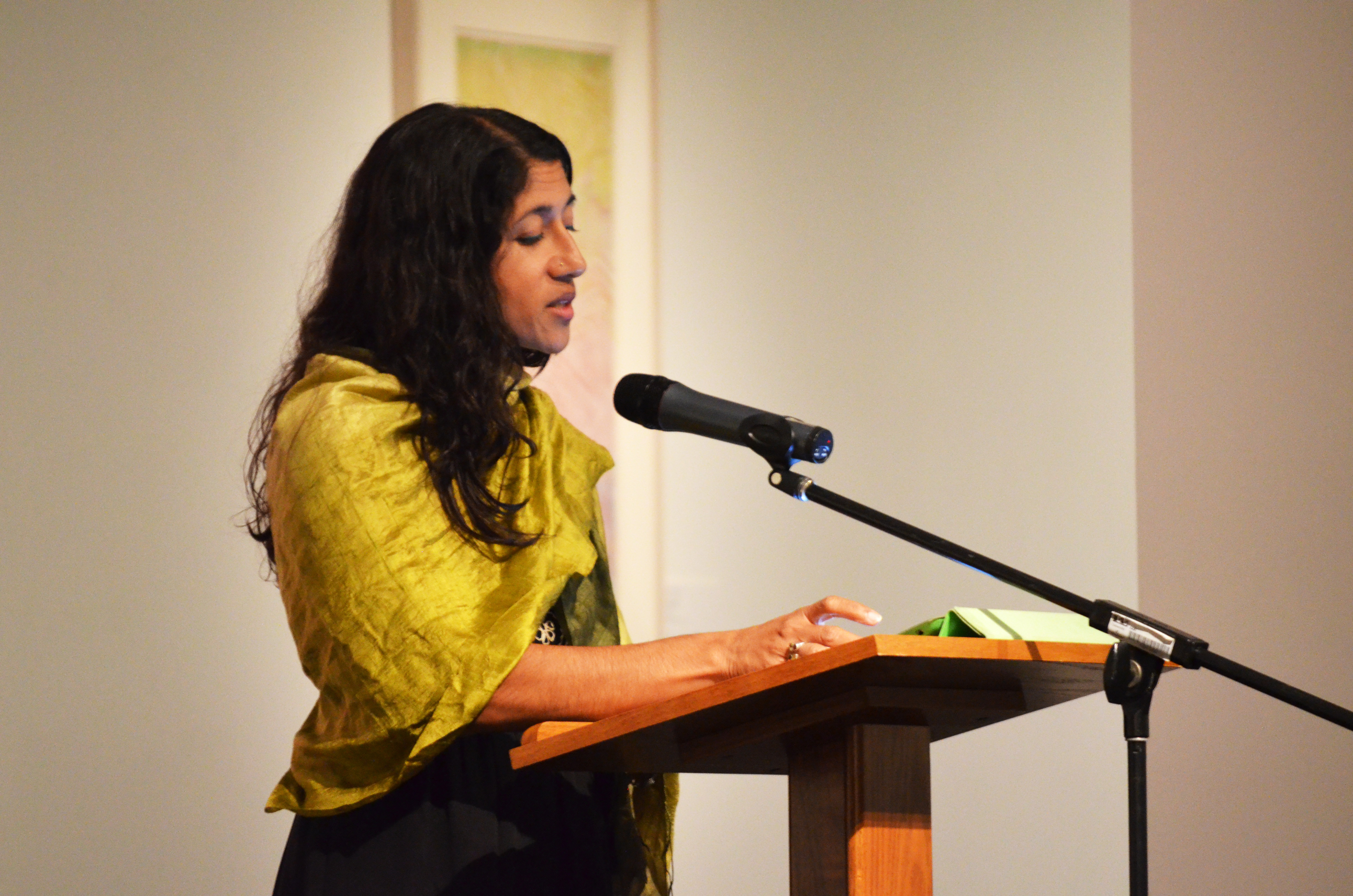
- Viswanathan reading at the 2015 Neustadt Festival
- Born: February 20, 1968 (age 58); Nelson, British Columbia, Canada
- Occupations: Novelist; Translator; Professor
- Spouse: Geoffrey Brock
- Website: https://padmaviswanathan.com

Padma Viswanathan (born 1968 Nelson, British Columbia) is a Tamil Canadian playwright, novelist, translator, and memoirist. She is a distinguished professor of creative writing at the University of Arkansas.

== Biography ==
Viswanathan graduated from University of Alberta and attended Harvard University as a visiting student for her fourth year. She received an MA from the Writing Seminars at Johns Hopkins University in 2004 and an MFA from the University of Arizona in 2006. She lives in Fayetteville, Arkansas, with her husband, the poet/translator Geoffrey Brock, and their two children.

She is the author of three novels, one memoir, and the translator of two novels from Brazilian Portuguese, and numerous works of short fiction. In 2026, her translation of a novel, Bury Your Dead, by Ana Paula Maia, will be published.

Viswanathan is co-editing with writer-translator Daniel Hahn The Penguin Book of Brazilian Short Stories which will be published in January 2027.

== Awards ==
In 2007, her story "Transitory Cities" won the 14th annual Boston Review Short-Story Contest, judged by George Saunders.

In 2017 she won Arkansas's Porter Prize.

In 2026, On Earth as it is Beneath, Viswanathan's English translation of Ana Paula Maia's 2017 novel, Assim na Terra como embaixo da Terra, was shortlisted for the International Booker Prize.

== Works ==
=== Short stories ===
- "Transitory Cities". Boston Review. 22 June 2012.
- "The Barber Lover". AGNI Online. 15 April 2023.
- "Better Protect America". Granta. March 2017.

=== Novels ===
- The Toss of a Lemon. Random House, Inc. 2008. ISBN 978-0-307-35632-1., takes place in South India in the first half of the twentieth century.
- The Ever After of Ashwin Rao. Random House, Inc. 2014. ISBN 978-0-307-35634-5., explores the aftermath of the 1985 bombing of an Air India flight.
- Like Every Form of Love. Random House, Inc. 2023. ISBN 9781039006218., a memoir of friendship and true crime.
- The Charterhouse of Padma. David R. Godine. October 2024. ISBN 978-1-56792-814-3., a hybrid novel about two women called "P", their lives, and their love of chartreuse.

=== Plays ===
- "House of Sacred Cows," originally produced by Northern Light Theatre in Edmonton and later published in the volume Ethnicities: Plays from the New West (1999)
- "By Air, By Water, By Wood", Frog and Nightgown Productions 2000, published South Asian Review, 2008

=== Radio plays ===
- "Disco Does Not Suck", CBC Radio, 1999

=== Anthologies ===
- Anne Nothof; Padma Viswanathan; Marty Chan; Jonathan Christenson (1999). Anne Nothof (ed.). Ethnicities: Plays from the New West. NeWest Press. ISBN 978-1-896300-03-0.

=== Translations ===
- São Bernardo. New York Review Books Classics. 5 May 2020. ISBN 978-1-68137-385-0.
- On Earth As It Is Beneath. Charco Press. 12 August 2025. ISBN 978-1-917260-10-7.

== Review ==
Daniel Baird of The Walrus reviewed The Toss of a Lemon in 2008.

In the introduction to her stunning first novel, Padma Viswanathan describes her grandmother's faltering attempts to recount their family history. "This time, she started farther back", she writes of one occasion, "with a story I'd never heard: of her own grandmother, married as a child and widowed before she was out of her teens; of that grandmother's son, childless and embittered; and her daughter, my grandmother's mother, victimized by her marriage." After trips to India, enormous amounts of research, and not a little invention, the result is The Toss of a Lemon.
