= Chelsea (magazine) =

- Discipline: Literary magazine
- Language: English
- Edited by: Alfredo de Palchi

Publication details
- History: 1958-2007
- Publisher: Chelsea Associates (United States)
- Frequency: Biannually

Standard abbreviations
- ISO 4: Chelsea

Indexing
- ISSN: 0009-2185

Chelsea was a small biannual literary magazine based in New York City. Edited for many years by Sonia Raiziss and Alfredo de Palchi, it published poetry, prose, book reviews, and translations with an emphasis on translations, art, and cross-cultural exchange.

== History ==
The magazine was established in 1958 by Ursule Molinaro, Venable Herndon, George Economou, Robert Kelly and Joan Kelly. Later, Sonia Raiziss and Alfredo de Palchi were editors. It published poems and prose by Denise Levertov, Umberto Eco, Raymond Carver, and Grace Paley. Writers such as W. S. Merwin, Sylvia Plath, A. R. Ammons and Paul Auster were published in the magazine when they were still emerging. Two entire issues (1976 and 2000) were devoted to the work of Laura (Riding) Jackson.

The journal has published both new and emerging writers, some of whom have received awards or had their work in the magazine subsequently published in the Pushcart Prize, The Best American Poetry series, the O. Henry Awards, and others.

Chelsea was published twice a year, in June and December, by Chelsea Associates, a non-profit corporation.

Chelsea ceased publication in 2007.

== The Chelsea awards for poetry and short fiction ==
The magazine gave out The Chelsea Award for Poetry and the Chelsea Award for Short Fiction.
