= Ana Paula Maia =

Brazilian writer (born 1977)

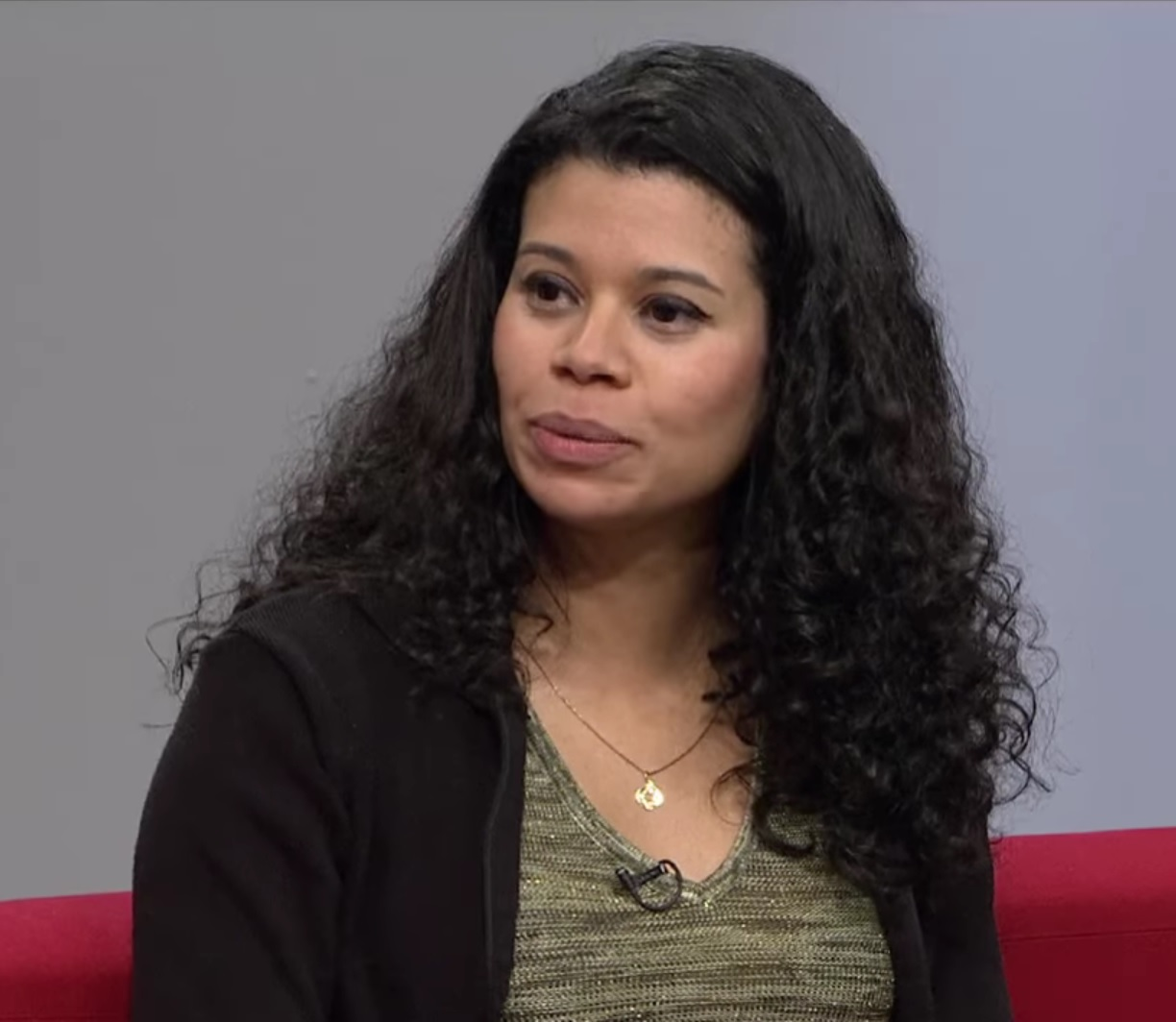
Ana Paula Maia in 2017

Ana Paula Maia (born 1977) is a Brazilian writer and screenwriter.

== Career ==
Maia's first book, O Habitante das falhas subterrâneas was published in 2003. She is the author of the Saga dos Brutos (Saga of Brutes) trilogy, which began with the short novels Entre rinhas de cachorros e porcos abatidos (Between Dog Fights and Hog Slaughter) and O Trabalho sujo dos outros (The Dirty Work of Others) —both published in a single volume— and concluded with the novel Carvão animal (Carbo animalis).

Her 2017 novel, Assim na Terra como embaixo da Terra, was published in English as On Earth as it is Beneath, translated by Padma Viswanathan. The novel is set in a remote penal colony in rural Brazil that has been abandoned by the government, leaving two officials in charge. Both wardens and prisoners seem trapped within the prison and the unforgiving landscape, as the narrative details unremitting violence and cruelty, with moments of bleak humour. Necessary Fiction found echoes of Cormac McCarthy, noting a pervading sense of dread isolation rendered in sparse prose, with the translation preserving Maia's mythic vision. The New York Times selected it as one of the best horror books of the month in August 2025, calling it inventive and unflinching, and noting that "while the atmosphere is heavy with brutality and murder, Maia’s prose offers the perfect counterbalance — it is beautiful and gripping." The novel was shortlisted for the International Booker Prize.

== Personal life ==
Maia was born in Nova Iguaçu, in the state of Rio de Janeiro; her mother is a literature teacher and her father is a bar owner. Maia grew up with books in her childhood, but lost interest in them in her adolescence, playing in a punk rock band during her teenage years. Maia graduated in computer science and communication science.

== Influences ==
Maia's writing is influenced by Dostoevsky, Edgar Allan Poe, Quentin Tarantino and Sergio Leone's films, TV series and pulp literature, among others. The main characters of her narratives are men, people working in essential and hazardous jobs, such as garbage collectors, coal miners and slaughterhouse workers.

She stated having no interest in writing about women, having said: "I am already a woman twenty-four hours a day. I want to be a man a little bit, a little rough. (...) I want to do something different. And I can only do that in literature, because in this life I won't be able to do that, I don't have that possibility.."

== Awards ==
Maia won the São Paulo Prize for Literature for Best Novel twice, with Assim na Terra como embaixo da Terra, in 2018 and Enterre Seus Mortos, in 2019.

== Works ==
- O habitante das falhas subterrâneas (2003)
- A Guerra dos Bastardos (2007)
- Saga dos Brutos trilogy (2009-11)
  - Vols. 1 and 2: Entre rinhas de cachorros e porcos abatidos and O trabalho sujo dos outros (2009). Between Dog Fights and Hog Slaughter and The Dirty Work of Others
  - Vol. 3: Carvão Animal (2011). Carbo animalis
- De Gados e Homens (2013).
  - Of Cattle and Men, trans. Zoë Perry (Charco Press, 2023)
- Assim na Terra como embaixo da Terra (2017).
  - On Earth As It Is Beneath, trans. Padma Viswanathan (Charco Press, 2025)
- Enterre Seus Mortos (2018)
  - Bury Your Dead, trans. Padma Viswanathan (Charco Press, 2026)
- De cada quinhentos uma alma (2021)
- Búfalos selvagens (2024)
- O Tenebroso Brilho do Sol (2026)

=== Compilations in English ===
- Saga of Brutes, trans. Alexandra Joy Forman (Dalkey Archive Press, 2016). ISBN 978-1628971460
