= Skylark Farm =

2004 novel by Antonia Arslan

- Original Italian language edition, La masseria delle allodole (2004)
- Author: Antonia Arslan
- Original title: La masseria delle allodole
- Translator: Geoffrey Brock
- Language: Italian
- Publisher: Rizzoli Libri
- Publication date: 2004-04-07
- Publication place: Italy
- English publication date: 2007-01-24
- Media type: Print

Skylark Farm (Italian: La masseria delle allodole) is an Italian language novel by Antonia Arslan, published by Rizzoli Libri, with release on April 7, 2004. The English translation, by Geoffrey Brock, was published by Knopf Publishers, with release on January 24, 2007. It is the author's first novel.

== Background ==
Arslan had conducted interviews with genocide survivors. Arslan's family had been affected by the genocide.

Brock stated that the book "was a difficult title to translate"; he chose "Skylark Farm" as the English title due to a "strong rustic" connotation, though he had "strongly considered" using The House of Skylarks.

== Plot ==
The novel's plot follows the Arslanian family, who own an estate called Skylark Farm, during the Armenian Genocide. The family lives in the western part of Turkey, in a city described by Ray Olson of Booklist as "small".

Yerwant Arslanian is living in Italy, and his brother Sempad wants to renovate the estate when his brother arrives. The Arslanians do not realise that the Armenian Genocide is about to occur. Yerwant is unable to leave Italy after the Italian government takes a side in World War I. Turkish soldiers kill most of the Arslanian males, and a pit intended to be made into a tennis court is where they are interred. The women and girls, and a boy dressed as a girl, are sent to Syria.

Writer Christine Thomas, in a review for the Chicago Tribune, stated that due to the amount of detail in the opening of the book, the "compassion" for the characters is built up, though due to the amount of detail, there is less "clarity".

== Adaptations ==
There is a film adaptation, The Lark Farm.

== Reception ==
Christopher de Bellaigue wrote that the translation was "sensitively" done. He criticised some "uneven" elements in the narrative, including flashing forward to the future and some "bathos" that is present in "deadpan descriptions of hideous events".

Booklist gave the book a starred review.

Kirkus Reviews refers to the book as an "Armenian Schindler's List".

Publishers Weekly stated that the novel "delivers vivid, powerful testimony of horrific cruelty and immeasurable loss." The publication stated that the characters are hampered by "bluntly omniscient narration".
