= John P. Welle =

American professor of Italian Studies and translator

John P. Welle is an American professor of Italian Studies and translator of poems from Italian to English.

== Life ==
He graduated from St. John's University and Indiana University Bloomington with an MFA and PhD. His poetry and translations have appeared in Dacotah Territory, The Cresset, The Juggler, Modern Poetry in Translation, and World Literature Today.

He lives in Indiana and teaches at the University of Notre Dame.

== Awards ==
- Fulbright Commission
- National Endowment for the Humanities.
- 1999 Welle and Ruth Feldman received the Raiziss/de Palchi Book Prize

== Works ==
=== Editor ===
- University of Notre Dame Department of Modern and Classical Languages, Italian Section. "Annali d'Italianistica". Annali D'Italianistica.

=== Translation ===
- The Poetry of Andrea Zanzotto. Bulzoni. 1987.
- Andrea Zanzotto (1997). Peasant's Wake for Fellini's Casanova and Other Poems. Translator John P. Welle, Ruth Feldman. University of Illinois Press. ISBN 978-0-252-06610-8.

=== Criticism ===
- Mark Musa, ed. (1995). "Dante in the Cinematic Mode". Dante's Inferno: the Indiana critical edition. Indiana University Press. ISBN 978-0-253-20930-6.
