= Antonia Arslan =

Italian writer and academic of Armenian origin

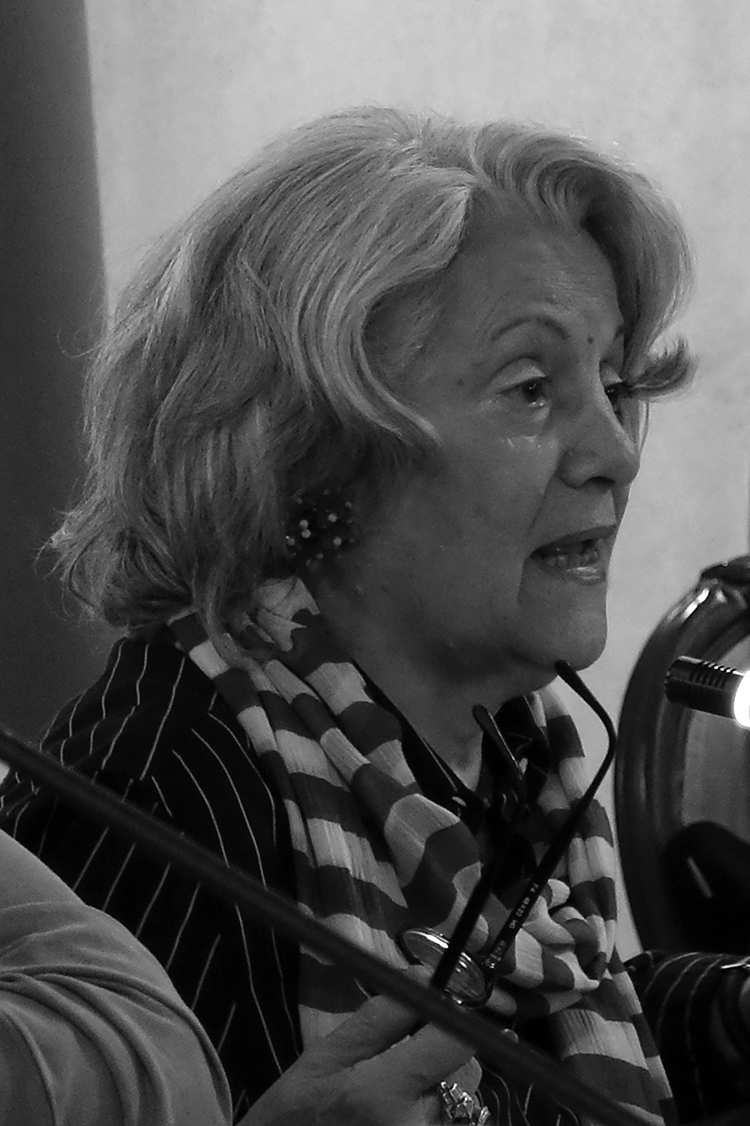
- Born: 1938 (age 87–88)
- Writing career
- Notable work: La masseria delle allodole
- Website: www.antoniarslan.it

Antonia Arslan (Armenian: Անտոնիա Արսլան, born 1938) is an Italian writer and academic of Armenian origin.

== Biography ==
Arslan was born in Padua in 1938 to Michele Arslan and Vittoria Marchiori. Her paternal grandfather Yerwant Arslanian was born in 1865 in Kharpert, now Harpoot.

After graduating in archaeology she became a professor of modern and contemporary Italian literature at the University of Padua and published copious studies, inter alia, on Italian popular fiction and Italian women writers of the nineteenth and twentieth centuries. Her primary concern as a literary critic is the Italian literary canon.

Her most recent publications have focused on her Armenian heritage. She translated two volumes of Daniel Varujan’s poetry into Italian and edited works on the Armenian genocide and on the experiences of Armenian refugees in Italy.

Her first novel, La masseria delle allodole, was published by Rizzoli in 2004. Drawing on the history of her recent ancestors it tells of the attempts of the members of an Armenian family caught up in the Armenian genocide to escape to Italy and join a relation who had been living there for forty years. Among other awards, it won the Premio Berto, Premio Fregene, Premio Stresa di Narrativa, Premio Fenice-Europa for 2004. It was also a finalist and winner of the 2004 Premio Campiello award. After winning the Il Campiello Secondo Noi by a spectacular margin - the book received nearly 50% of all votes, outstripping the book in second place by 26 votes - Antonia Arslan's La masseria delle allodole was expected to win the Premio Super-Campiello easily. After a stunning series of unexplained events, it scandalously came in second place for that award, possibly due to political calculations, losing for two votes. Incidentally, the difference of one vote would have triggered a recasting of the votes. In 2005 La masseria delle allodole was awarded the Premio P.E.N. and the Premio Manzoni. The book has been translated into numerous languages, including a translation into English by Geoffrey Brock as Skylark Farm, published by Knopf in 2007, and was selected as a finalist for the Los Angeles Times Book Prize and the International Dublin Literary Award/ It inspired the Taviani brothers’ 2007 film La Masseria Delle Allodole (The Lark Farm in English).

Her second novel, La Strada di Smirne, was published in 2009 by Rizzoli, and it appeared in Armenian as Զմյուռնիայի ճանապարհ in 2012.

Arslan's more recent publications include Ishtar2: cronache dal mio risveglio (2009) published by Rizzoli, and chronicles her brush with death in 2009, Il cortile dei girasoli parlanti published by Piemme Edizioni in 2011, and Il libro di Mush published by Skira in 2012. The latter book is an account of the Msho Charantir, the largest surviving Armenian manuscript. It won the prestigious Premio Giuria Viareggio.

Arslan has received such awards as the Narekatsi Medal (2010) and the Movses Khorenatsi Medal (2012) for her cultural contributions.

== Works ==
- — (1977). Dame, droga e galline. Il romanzo popolare italiano tra Ottocento e Novecento. Cleup.
- — (2009). La masseria delle allodole. BURextra (10th ed.). Milano: BUR. ISBN 978-88-17-01633-9. OCLC 898644879.
- — (2009). La strada di Smirne. La scala. Milano: Rizzoli. ISBN 978-88-17-02799-1.
- — (2011). Il cortile dei girasoli parlanti. Milano: Piemme. ISBN 978-88-566-1973-7.
- — (2012). Il libro di Mush. Narrativa Skira. Milano: Skira. ISBN 978-88-572-1151-0.
- — (2013). Il calendario dell'avvento. Piemme. ISBN 9788856631098.
- — (2015). Il rumore delle perle di legno. Milano: Rizzoli. ISBN 9788858679050.
- —; Pasqui, Marina (2013). Dame, galline e regine: la scrittura femminile italiana fra '800 e '900. Classica i contemporanei (2nd ed.). Milano: Guerini. ISBN 978-88-6250-402-7.

== Works in English ==
- — (2013). Skylark farm. New York: Vintage Books. ISBN 978-0-307-49103-9.
- — (2020). Silent angel. Translated by Nash-Marshall, Siobhan. Ignatius Press. ISBN 978-1-950939-13-8.
