= Adria Bernardi =

American novelist and translator

Adria Bernardi is an American novelist and translator.

== Awards ==
- 2014 Independent Publisher Book Bronze Award, essay/creative nonfiction, Dead Meander Kore Press, 2012.
- 2010-2011 Christopher Isherwood Foundation Fellowship
- 2009 “If looking up to God you find any way that’s pervious,” Margie: The American Journal of Poetry. First place. Lucia Perillo judge
- 2008 Recommended Book Award, The Boston Authors Club, Openwork
- 2007 Raiziss/de Palchi Translation Award
- 2002 Worcester Cultural Commission, Creative and Performing Arts Fellowship
- 2000 Drue Heinz Literature Prize recipient, selected by Frank Conroy
- 1999 Bakeless Fiction Prize for Fiction, selected by Andrea Barrett
- 1999 First Prize, Essay, Missouri Review.
- 1998 recipient of the A. E. Coppard Award for Short Fiction
- 1995 recipient of the James Fellowship for Novel

== Work ==
=== Nonfiction ===
- Dead Meander (essays). Kore Press, 2012.
- Houses with Names: The Italian Immigrants of Highwood, Illinois. (oral history and messages). University of Illinois Press, 1990. ISBN 978-0-252-01581-6.

=== Fiction ===
- Openwork; In the Gathering Woods. Southern Methodist University Press. 2007. ISBN 978-0-87074-510-2.
- The Day Laid on the Altar. University Press of New England. 1999.
- In the Gathering Woods (short stories), University of Pittsburgh Press, 2000.

=== Translation ===
- Ubaldo de Robertis, The Rings of the Universe: Selected Poems. Chelsea Editions. 2016
- Cristina Annino, Chronic Hearing: Selected Poems 1977-2012. Chelsea Editions, 2014.
- Francesca Pellegrino, Chernobylove—The Day After the Wind: Selected Poems 2008-2010. Selected, Edited, and Translated by Adria Bernardi. Chelsea Editions, 2014.
- Raffaello Baldini, Small Talk (poetry). Gradiva Publications, 2009.
- Rinaldo Caddeo Siren’s Song: Selected Poetry and Prose. Chelsea Editions, 2009.
- Raffaello Baldini, Page Proof (theatrical monologue). Bordighiera Press, 2001.
- Gianni Celati, Adventures in Africa (prose). University of Chicago Press, 2000. ISBN 978-0-226-09955-2
- Tonino Guerra. Abandoned Places (poetry). Guernica Editions, Toronto, 1999. ISBN 978-1-55071-030-4

Poems in Translation

Francesca Pellegrino. “Quinconce,” “Parts,” “Believe me, you and you, the years do fashion / a butcher’s knife,” “Impossibile.” Gradiva International Journal of Italian Literature. Issue 43.

Francesca Pellegrino. “ToGod.” RHINO Poetry. 2013.

Francesca Pellegrino. “You can trust your car to the man who wears the star,” “For everything else, there’s Mastercard.” Inventory: Princeton University Translation Journal. Fall 2012.

Translation, poetry of Francesca Pellegrino. “Alkaseltzer,” “Chestnuts Roasting on an Open Fire (Firestarters),” “Eeny, meeny, miny, moe,” “Sim Sala Bim,” “SPAM (or Another version of meat in a can).” Cerise Press; Fall/Winter 2012–2013.

Francesca Pellegrino. “To Aver,” “Someone’s gotta win,” Caffè corretto at the Assembly/Line Cafe.” Asymptote. July 2012.

Francesca Pellegrino. “Extralite,” “Nouvelle cuisine,” “Spring-time is a word undone,” “The Man from del monte says Yes,” “Don’t Touch My Breil.” Journal of Italian Translation. Spring 2012.

Francesca Pellegrino. “Incipit,” “solitudeRia,” “tightropeRia,” “falseRia,” “incendiRia, “lacrimoseRia,” “refractoRia,” “dismemoRia.” Metamorphoses: a Journal of Literary Translation. Spring 2012.

Raffaello Baldini, “Hygiene.” Poetry. 2007.

Raffaello Baldini, “Water,” “Snow.” Italian Poetry in Translation. 2006.

Raffaello Baldini “The Watch,”, Seneca Review. Fall 2005.

Raffaello Baldini, “The Comedy,” “Fussbudget,” “Stricken,” “The Will.” Metamorphoses. Spring 2005.

Raffaello Baldini, “Picking,” Two Lines. 2004.

Raffaello Baldini, “The Permit,” “The Meatball,” Margie: The American Journal of Poetry. 2004.

Raffaello Baldini, “Night,” Agni. Fall 2003.

Raffaello Baldini, “Thieves,” “The Piece of Land,” Arts & Letters. Fall 2003.

Raffaello Baldini, “Solitaire,” Diner. Fall 2003.

Raffaello Baldini, “Noise,” Hunger Mountain. Fall 2002.

Raffaello Baldini, “The Pine Grove,” Two Lines. 2002.

Raffaello Baldini, “Absolution,” Beacons. 2002.

Dialect Poetry of Northern Italy, Luigi Bonaffini, editor. Legas Press, 2002.

Gregorio Scalise. Poetry, Autumn 1989.
