= Sonia Raiziss =

American poet

- in France, 1966
- Born: October 13, 1906
- Died: March 19, 1994 (aged 87)
- Occupations: Editor, poet
- Writing career
- Genre: poetry

Sonia Raiziss Giop (October 13, 1906 – March 19, 1994) was an American poet, critic, and translator.

== Life and career ==
Raiziss was born in Germany and immigrated to the U.S. as a child. She was raised in Philadelphia, where her father biochemist George W. Raiziss, taught at the University of Philadelphia. She saw her earliest poems published while she was still in high school. Raiziss went on to earn undergraduate and doctoral degrees at the University of Philadelphia and also studied at Columbia University. While studying at the Sorbonne, she published her first poetry collection, Through a Glass Darkly.

was an editor of Chelsea (magazine), from 1960 to 1994, with Ursule Molinaro, featuring poems and prose by Denise Levertov, Sylvia Plath, Umberto Eco, Raymond Carver, and Grace Paley. She corresponded with Laura Riding, and David Finkel.

Her work appeared in American prefaces, The Atlantic, Beloit Poetry Journal. Granite, The Prairie Schooner, Plainsong, Virginia Quarterly Review, Yale Poetry Review.

As a member of the League of American Writers, she served on its Keep America Out of War Committee in January 1940 during the period of the Hitler-Stalin pact.

She lived in Bucks County, Pennsylvania. She married Alfredo Giop de Palchi. She adopted a son, Peter St. Mu Raiziss of Sacramento, California. Sonia died in Manhattan.

== Philanthropy ==
Her Sonia Raiziss Giop Charitable Foundation (Alfredo de Palchi trustee) continues to fund the Jane Austen Essay Contest, Bordighera Poetry Prize, and the Raiziss/de Palchi Translation Awards.

== Awards ==
- 1937 Guggenheim Fellowship

== Works ==
=== Poetry ===
- "Jobhunter" (PDF). Beloit Poetry Journal. 1: 12–13. Winter 1950–1951.
- "The Unripe Dead", Verse Daily, 2006
- Through a Glass Darkly. Book Club Associates. 1932.
- Bucks County Blues. New Rivers Press. 1977. ISBN 978-0-912284-90-3.

=== Translation ===
- Alfredo de Palchi (Fall 1963). "Arizona" (PDF). Beloit Poetry Journal. 14: 9–10.
- "The Scorpion's Dark Dance" (1993), Alfredo de Palchi.

=== Criticism ===
- "Metaphysical Passion: Seven Modern American Poets and the 17th-Century Tradition," 1952 University of Philadelphia and reissued by Greenwood Press in 1970.
