= Ruth Feldman =

American poet and translator

- Born: 1911; Liverpool, Ohio
- Died: January 11, 2003 (aged 91–92)
- Writing career
- Genre: poetry

Ruth Feldman (1911 Liverpool, Ohio – January 11, 2003) was an American poet and translator.

== Life ==
Her father died when she was young and her mother when she was just 17. She lived with her brother, Milton, who was attending Harvard Law School, while attending Wellesley College.

She lived half the year in her condo overlooking the Charles River; the other half she lived in the Hotel de la Ville, Rome at the top of the Spanish Steps.

She is the author of five books of poetry and fifteen books of Italian translations, all poetry except Primo Levi's concentration camp stories.

Her poetry has been translated into Italian, French, and Spanish. Her work appeared in AGNI, and New York Review of Books.

== Awards ==
- 1999 Feldman and John P. Welle Raiziss/de Palchi Book Prize
- John Florio Prize in England
- Circe-Sabaudia in Italy
- Italo Calvino Prize in the United States
- Literary Translator's Fellowship from the National Endowment for the Arts.
- Raymond E. Baldwin Award

== Work ==
=== Poetry ===
- Primo Levi. "Listen". Pō'ĭ-trē.
- The Ambition of Ghosts. Green River Press. 1979. ISBN 978-0-940580-11-4.
- To Whom it May Concern. Bauhan. 1986. ISBN 978-0-87233-086-3.
- Birthmark. Cross-Cultural Communications. 1993. ISBN 978-0-89304-388-9.

=== Translations ===
- Jules Chametzky; John Felstiner; Hilene Flanzbaum, eds. (2001). "Sherma". Jewish American literature. Norton. ISBN 978-0-393-04809-4.
- Andrea Zanzotto (1997). Peasant's Wake for Fellini's Casanova and Other Poems. University of Illinois Press. ISBN 978-0-252-06610-8.
- Andrea Zanzotto (1975). Selected Poetry of Andrea Zanzotto. Translators Ruth Feldman, Brian Swann. Princeton University Press. ISBN 978-0-691-06290-7.
- Primo Levi (1995). Moments of reprieve. Translator Ruth Feldman. Penguin Classics. ISBN 978-0-14-018895-0.
- Margherita Guidacci (1992). Landscape with ruins: selected poetry of Margherita Guidacci. Translator Ruth Feldman. Wayne State University Press. ISBN 978-0-8143-2352-6.
- Rocco Scotellaro (1980). The Dawn is Always New: Selected Poetry of Rocco Scotellaro. Translators Ruth Feldman, Brian Swann. Princeton University Press.
- Margherita Guidacci (1989). A book of sibyls: poems. Translator Ruth Feldman. Rowan Tree Press. ISBN 978-0-937672-26-6.
- Bartolo Cattafi (1981). The dry air of the fire: selected poems. Translator Brian Swann, Ruth Feldman. Translation Press. ISBN 978-0-931556-04-3.
- Lucio Piccolo (1972). Collected Poems of Lucio Piccolo. Translators Brian Swann, Ruth Feldman. Books on Demand. ISBN 978-0-7837-1407-3.
- Primo Levi (1976). Shema: collected poems of Primo Levi. Menard Press. ISBN 978-0-903400-26-8.
- Rocco Scotellaro (1993). The Garden of the Poor. Translator Ruth Feldman, Brian Swann. Cross-Cultural Communications. ISBN 978-0-89304-644-6.
- Margherita Guidacci; Angela Giannitrapani (1986). Liber fulguralis. Translator Ruth Feldman. Facoltà di Magistero, Università di Messina: Dist. Libreria Editrice Hobelix.

=== Editor ===
- Glauco Cambon (1979). Ruth Feldman; Brian Swann (eds.). Italian Poetry Today: Currents and Trends: an Anthology. New Rivers Press. ISBN 978-0-89823-003-1.
