= Andrea Zanzotto =

Italian poet (1921–2011)

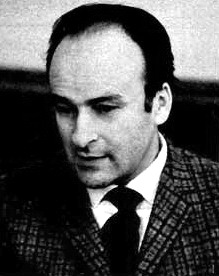
- Born: 10 October 1921; Pieve di Soligo (province of Treviso, Veneto), Italy
- Died: 18 October 2011 (aged 90); Conegliano (province of Treviso, Veneto), Italy
- Occupation: Italian poet

Andrea Zanzotto (10 October 1921 – 18 October 2011) was an Italian poet.

== Biography ==
Andrea Zanzotto was born in Pieve di Soligo (province of Treviso, Veneto), Italy to Giovanni and Carmela Bernardi.

His father, Giovanni (born 18 November 1888), had received degrees from the École supérieure de peinture at Brussels (1911, specializing in trompe-l'œil in wood and marble) and the Academy of Fine Arts at Bologna (1913, diploma di professore di disegno). Having been hired by a large painting business in Trieste, he was inducted into the army in 1915 and took part in combat on the Piave River. Giovanni had been involved with Carmela for some time but postponed marriage until his work abroad (Trieste at that time belonged to the Austro-Hungarian Empire) earned him enough to support a family.

=== Education ===
For the first two years of his life, Zanzotto lived with his parents near via Sartori. In 1922, they moved into a house that the father acquired in the Cal Santa district. This would be the setting and house most often described by the poet. As he wrote in his "Self-portrait" (Autoritratto, 1977), this was from the very beginning, the centre of his world.

In 1923, his sisters Angela and Marina were born. In 1924 he attended a Montessori kindergarten run by nuns. In 1925, his sister Maria was born.

In the meantime, his father, who had openly espoused support for Giacomo Matteotti, was accused of anti-fascism. In the course of time, his opposition to the fascist regime made it difficult for him to find any kind of work, to the point of deciding in 1925 to take refuge in Paris and then at Annoeullin (near Lille), where he worked for some friends of his. He returned to his home country for a brief period, but in 1926 was forced back to France, remaining in Royan until December of that year.

==== Elementary school ====
Thanks to his teacher, Marcellina Dalto, Zanzotto already knew how to write when he started elementary school in 1927. He passed immediately to the second grade. As the poet recounts in his "Self-portrait", he already took pleasure in the music of words: "I felt something infinitely sweet listening to chants, nursery rhymes and little verses, even those of the children's magazine Il Corriere dei Piccoli -- not so much in singing, but insofar as they were pronounced or simply spoken, according to harmony linked to the very function of language, to its inner song."

In 1928 his father Giovanni took a job as a teacher in a school in Cadore and decided to move with the family to Santo Stefano where Zanzotto completed his second grade. By the end of summer, however, Giovanni realized that the distance between his wife and her mother was causing his wife to suffer. He decided to move the family back to Pieve.

The death of Zanzotto's sister Marina in 1929 made a lasting impression on the mind of the young poet.

In that year, his father Giovanni came to public attention for his campaigning against the fascist plebiscite, and was condemned to remain in exile. Nevertheless, he managed to work on the restoration of the church at Costalissoio. Zanzotto, attending third grade at the time, joined him during summer vacation, but suffered homesickness.

In 1930, Zanzotto's brother Ettore was born. At the same time, Giovanni was forced to go into debt due to the embezzlement and flight of a clerk at the company (a labour cooperative for injured veterans) which was providing him with the means to support the family. This imposed financial constraints on the entire family.

During this period, he became close to his maternal grandmother and to his aunt Maria, who as he wrote in Uno squardo dalla periferia ("A view from the edge"), made him listen to "fragments of Latino maccheronico (mock Latin)" and involved him in the activity of the little theatre where she worked as a dramaturge, capocomico, director and actress.

At school, he proved a lively but not always disciplined student, often receiving the scoldings of his father. The young man showed no talent for drawing, the very subject which the father had mastered. The father insisted then that Zanzotto take music lessons since music was the passion of the town thanks to the fame of local soprano Toti Dal Monte (whom Zanzotto would recall at the being of his opera, Idioma).

==== Middle school ====
Having completed elementary school in 1931 as an off-campus student at the Collegio Balbi-Valier and taken his examinations in Vittorio Veneto, Zanzotto began middle school, gradually arriving at the decision to study to pursue a teaching diploma, a decision driven above all by his family's precarious financial position.

His father worked in the meantime in Santo Stefano, but was forced, in 1932, due to poorer wages, to return to Annoeullin where he remained until November. He returned to Pieve in 1933 and although he remained under a ban that prevented him from teaching, he was able to contribute to the upkeep of his family thanks to a part-time position at Collegio Balbi-Valier and to various odd jobs. Taking account of his responsibilities to the family, he avoided any direct conflict with his political enemies.

==== Teaching school ====
With the transition to teaching school, which Zanzotto commuted to Treviso to attend, commenced his first strong literary interests, which he nourished at the moment by consulting the encyclopedia compiled by Giacomo Prampolini.

In 1936, his first love re-emerged alongside the inspiration for the first verses he succeeded in publishing, with the cooperation of his grandmother and aunt, in an anthology for which he paid a small fee.

The verses didn't yet have a personal style, and felt the influence of Giovanni Pascoli, given that a nephew of Pascoli worked in the local bank, and knowing his passion for poetry, presented him with a gift of some of the poet's work in the first edition.

==== High school ====
In 1937 his sister Angela died of typhus. To the pain of grief, which had stricken him profoundly, was added the fatigue of the commute to Treviso and the intensification of his studies. Wanting to graduate in the shortest time possible, he had undergone an examination in October of the previous year, comprising all of the junior year subjects. He passed it and started to study Greek in order to pass the entrance examination for liceo classico (a high school focused on Classics).

Allergies and asthma, from which he had already suffered, began to present themselves in more forceful episodes. In addition to the symptoms, these brought on a feeling of exclusion and peril: "I think it may have had a negative influence on my childhood and adolescence, this particular aberrant idea which gradually took root in me: the impossibility of actively participating in the game of life, insofar as I would soon be excluded. I suffered from various types of allergies, and at that time, the diagnosis could be rather confused and doubtful. Asthma and hay fever, which had tormented me since I was a boy, were sometimes interpreted as a condition that could seriously worsen, even in the short term" (from the "Self-Portrait").

Having received his teaching credentials, he was entrusted with several pupils for private lessons by the director of Collegio Balbi-Valler and obtained 2,000 lire as a debt of honour from the parish priest, Monsignor Martin, for continuing his studies.

Zanzotto passed the admission examination, finally achieving his classical diploma by examination without formal preparation at the Liceo Canova in Treviso.

==== University ====
In 1939, he enrolled in the College of Letters at the University of Padua where he studied under Diego Valeri and the Latinist, Concetto Marchesi.

With Valeri's encouragement, he immersed himself in the writings of Baudelaire and discovered Rimbaud as well as (thanks to Luigi Stefanini) the poetry of Hölderlin, which he read for the first time in Vincenzo Errante's translation.

Meanwhile, he began to study German so that he might read Hölderlin, Goethe and Heine in the original.

In 1940, he worked for the first time as a substitute teacher in Valdobbiadene. He discovered at that time that within the regime and above all in the student clubs, there were many who nevertheless acted with practical autonomy, or in contrast to himself, as he came to be informed by his friend, Ettore Luccini, history and philosophy teacher at the liceo classico.

In this period, they put out the magazine Il Bo in Padua, marked by a notable non-conformist stance, as well as the University of Treviso periodical, Signum (along with Giorgio Strehler, Mario Luzi and Mario Tobino, among others), which exhibited a superficial adherence to the positions of the regime.

The news of the outbreak of World War II was met in the town with great consternation, the economic crisis came to the fore, and Zanzotto's family had to sell half of the house at Col Santa.

In 1941 the substitute teaching position in Valdobbiadene was not renewed, but Zanzotto managed to find one in Treviso with a middle school.

At the Young Fascists University of Treviso (Gioventù Universitaria Fascista), within which there were also people practising anti-fascism, he made, in 1942, a "presentation" on Eugenio Montale, where he interpreted the pessimism of the author in a political and ethical light.

He received his diploma in Italian literature on 30 October 1942, with a thesis on the work of Grazia Deledda. Professor Natale Busetto was his advisor (relatore).

=== The war ===
Called to military service, he received a deferment for his weak upper body and his severe allergy-related asthma, and thus was exempted from conscription into the army of '21, the protagonist of the military campaign in Russia and Greece. He then refused to respond to the recruitment of volunteers organized by the Fascist Party.

He published a prose poem entitled Adagio in issue 10 of Signum, and the first drafts of fiction, lyrical and prose, that would make up the older core of Sull'Altopiano ("On the Plateau", published in 1964) date back to that year.

An opportunity to publish presented itself in the collection of poetry assembled by the Florentine magazine Rivoluzione, founded by Mario Tobino, but due to the war, the periodical was forced to shut down.

== Works in English translation ==
- Selected Poetry and Prose of Andrea Zanzotto, Edited and Translated by Patrick Barron With Additional Translations by Ruth Feldman, Thomas J. Harrison, Brian Swann, John P. Welle, and Elizabeth A. Wilkins. 2009, University of Chicago Press. ISBN 978-0-226-97885-7. OCLC 779112149
- Selected Poetry of Andrea Zanzotto, edited and translated by Ruth Feldman-Brian Swann, Princeton University Press, Princeton, (New Jersey) 1975. ISBN 9780691062907, OCLC 869015910
- Poems by Andrea Zanzotto, Translated from the Italian by Anthony Barnett, A-B, Lewes (Canada) 1993 ISBN 0-907954-19-7; translation from LA BELTA and from PASQUE.
- Peasant's Wake for Fellini's "Casanova" and Other Poems, Edited and Translated by John P. Welle and Ruth Feldman, Drawings by Federico Fellini and Augusto Murer, University of Illinois Press, Urbana and Chicago 1997
- Haiku for a Season - Haiku per una stagione, edited by Anna Secco e Patrick Barron, Chicago and London, The University of Chicago Press, 2012.
- Fosfeni, Andrea Zanzotto, Translated by Pasquale Verdicchio, Toronto, Guernica Editions, 2010.

== Sources ==
- Morto il poeta Andrea Zanzotto, Corriere del Veneto, 18 Oct 2011.
- Massimo Colella, «La pura luce dell’esistere». Tracce petrarchesche in «Conglomerati» di Andrea Zanzotto, in «Strumenti critici», XXXVI, 1, 2021, pp. 183-202.
