= Geoffrey Brock =

American poet and translator (born 1964)

- Born: October 19, 1964 (age 61); Atlanta, Georgia, U.S.
- Occupations: Poet; translator; professor
- Spouse: Padma Viswanathan
- Website: geoffreybrock.com

Geoffrey Brock (born October 19, 1964) is an American poet and translator. Since 2006 he has taught creative writing and literary translation at the University of Arkansas, where he is Distinguished Professor of English.

== Biography ==
Brock is the son of poets Van K. Brock and Frances Brock. Born in Atlanta, he grew up in Tallahassee, Florida, and as an adult he has lived in numerous American cities as well as in London, England, and Florence, Italy. He now lives with his wife, the novelist Padma Viswanathan, in Fayetteville, Arkansas.

He received a Bachelor of Arts degree from Florida State University in 1986 and a Masters of Fine Arts degree from the University of Florida in 1998. He also holds an MA and a PhD in Comparative Literature from the University of Pennsylvania.

Brock is the author of four books of poetry, the translator of numerous volumes of poetry, prose, and comics, mostly from Italian, and the editor of The FSG Book of Twentieth-Century Italian Poetry, which reviewers called "a beautiful, superbly edited anthology" and "so thoughtfully conceived that the experience of reading [it] feels like the experience of reading an intricate novel." His poems and translations have appeared widely in journals and anthologies, including The New Yorker, Poetry Magazine, The New Republic, Paris Review, Yale Review, PN Review, The New York Times, The New York Review of Books, and Best American Poetry.

== Awards ==
Brock has received numerous honors for both his translations and his own poetry. In 2005, his first book of poems, Weighing Light, won the New Criterion Poetry Prize, judged by David Yezzi, A.E. Stallings, and Charles Martin. In 2014, his second book of poems, Voices Bright Flags, received the Anthony Hecht Prize, judged by Heather McHugh. His third collection, After, appeared in 2024 and was named one of the "Best Poetry Collections of 2024" by Electric Literature. He has also been the recipient of a National Endowment for the Arts poetry fellowship, a Stegner Fellowship in poetry from Stanford University, and a Cullman Fellowship from the Dorothy and Lewis B. Cullman Center for Scholars and Writers at the New York Public Library. His poems have been included in The Best American Poetry and the Pushcart Prize anthologies.

As a translator, Brock has received a National Endowment for the Arts translation fellowship, two Raiziss/de Palchi Awards from the Academy of American Poets (one for his translation of Cesare Pavese's Disaffections, the other for his translation of Giovanni Pascoli's Last Dream), the Lois Roth Award from the MLA (for his translation of Disaffections), a translation fellowship from the George A. and Eliza Gardner Howard Foundation at Brown University, the John Frederick Nims Memorial Prize for Translation from Poetry Magazine, the Lewis Galantière Award from the American Translators Association (for his translation of Umberto Eco's novel The Mysterious Flame of Queen Loana), a Guggenheim Fellowship, and the National Translation Award for poetry (for his translation of Giuseppe Ungaretti's Allegria) from the American Literary Translators Association.

== Books ==
=== Poetry ===
- Geoffrey Brock (2005). Weighing Light. Ivan R. Dee. ISBN 978-1-56663-667-4.
- Geoffrey Brock (2014). Voices Bright Flags. Waywiser. ISBN 978-1-904130642.
- Geoffrey Brock (2021). Paolo Febbraro (ed.). Confluenze: poesie scelte. Translated by Paolo Febbraro; Moira Egan; Damiano Abeni. Elliot Edizioni. ISBN 978-8-892760561.
- Geoffrey Brock (2024). After. Paul Dry Books. ISBN 978-1589881877.

=== Translations of Poetry ===
- Cesare Pavese (2002). Disaffections: Complete Poems 1930-1950. Translated by Geoffrey Brock. Copper Canyon Press. ISBN 978-1-55659-174-7.
- Patrizia Cavalli (2012). Gini Alhadeff (ed.). My Poems Won't Change the World: Selected Poems. Translated by Gini Alhadeff; Mark Strand; Jorie Graham; Jonathan Galassi; Rosanna Warren; Geoffrey Brock; J.D. McClatchy; David Shapiro; Moira Egan; Damiano Abeni. Farrar, Straus and Giroux. ISBN 978-0-374217440.
- Giovanni Pascoli (2019). Last Dream. Translated by Geoffrey Brock. World Poetry Books. ISBN 978-0-999261354.
- Giuseppe Ungaretti (2020). Allegria. Translated by Geoffrey Brock. Archipelago Books. ISBN 978-1-939810649.
- Silvia Vecchini (2024). Before Nightfall. Translated by Geoffrey Brock. NYRB Kids. ISBN 978-1681377926.

=== Translations of Prose ===
- Roberto Calasso (2005). K. Translated by Geoffrey Brock. Knopf. ISBN 978-1-400041893.
- Umberto Eco (2005). The Mysterious Flame of Queen Loana. Translated by Geoffrey Brock. Harcourt. ISBN 978-0-15-101140-7.
- Franz Kafka, Roberto Calasso (2006). The Zürau Aphorisms. Translated by Michael Hofmann, Geoffrey Brock. Schocken Books. ISBN 978-0-8052-1207-5.
- Antonia Arslan (2007). Skylark Farm. Translated by Geoffrey Brock. Knopf. ISBN 978-1-4000-4435-1. - Entry in Google Books
- Carlo Collodi (2008). Pinocchio. Translated by Geoffrey Brock. Introduced by Umberto Eco, afterword by Rebecca West. New York Review Books. ISBN 978-1-59017-289-6.
- Carlo Collodi (2012). Pinocchio. Translated by Geoffrey Brock. Illustrated by Fulvio Testa. The New York Review Children's Collection. ISBN 978-1-590175880.
- Italo Calvino (2016). Six Memos for the Next Millennium. Translated by Geoffrey Brock. Mariner Books. ISBN 978-0-544146679.
- Marco Missiroli (2024). The Rabbit Punch. Translated by Geoffrey Brock. Sceptre (imprint). ISBN 978-1399724036.

=== Translations of Comics ===
- Marion Fayolle (2019). The Tenderness of Stones. Translated by Geoffrey Brock. New York Review Comics. ISBN 978-1-681372983.
- Chantal Montellier (2023). Social Fiction. Translated by Geoffrey Brock. New York Review Comics. ISBN 978-1-681377407.

=== Anthologies Edited ===
- Geoffrey Brock, Marian Schwartz, ed. (2004). Two Lines: Power. Two Lines Press. ISBN 978-1-931883108.
- Geoffrey Brock, ed. (2012). The FSG Book of Twentieth-Century Italian Poetry. Farrar, Straus and Giroux. ISBN 978-0-374-10538-9.

== Selected Online Works ==
- Eco, Umberto. "The Gorge (short fiction)". The New Yorker. Translated by Geoffrey Brock.
- Brock, Geoffrey. "Selected poetry, prose, and translations". Poetry Magazine. Poetry Foundation.
- Brock, Geoffrey. "Some Recent Italian Poems (essay)". Poetry Magazine. Poetry Foundation.
- Brock, Geoffrey. "Exhuming Vallejo (essay)". Poetry Magazine. Poetry Foundation.
- Brock, Geoffrey. "Our Emissary of Italian Prose (essay)". New York Review of Books.
- Brock, Geoffrey. "Tuning In: On Retranslating Quotations (essay)". California Italian Studies.
- Brock, Geoffrey. "Poets on Translation: Otherwise the Same (essay)". Poetry Foundation.
