= Antonio Porta (author) =

Italian author and poet

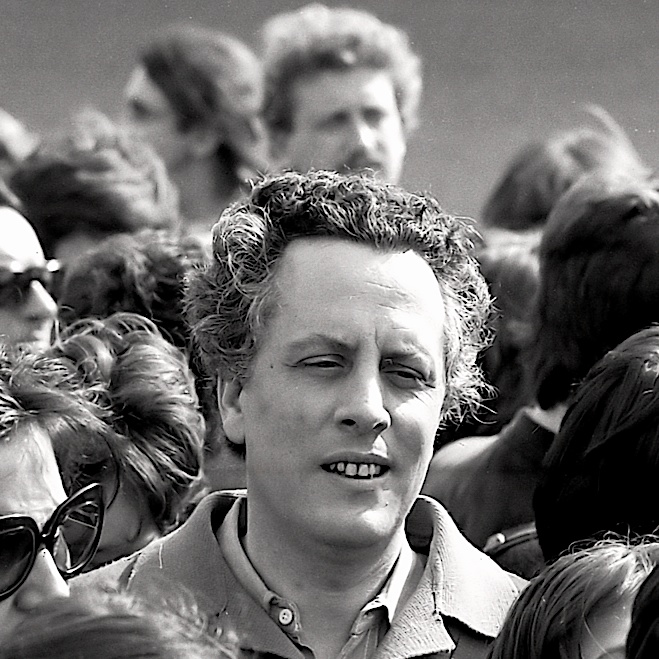
- Antonio Porta in Orvieto in 1976 for the "Scrittura Lettura" conference
- Born: Antonio Paolazzi; 9 November 1935; Vicenza, Kingdom of Italy
- Died: 12 April 1989 (aged 53); Rome, Italy
- Occupations: Poet; novelist; playwright
- Writing career
- Language: Italian
- Genres: Poetry; novel; play
- Literary movement: Neoavanguardia

Antonio Porta (pen-name of Leo Paolazzi) was an Italian author and poet and one of the founders of the Italian literary movement Gruppo 63.

== Biography ==
Antonio Porta was born Leo Paolazzi in Vicenza in 1935. In 1958, he became an editor of the literary magazine Il Verri under Luciano Anceschi. During his time as an editor, he wrote a collection of poems to be included in the anthology I novissimi (1961), which included works by Elio Pagliarani, Edoardo Sanguineti, Alfredo Giuliani, and Nanni Balestrini.

== Gruppo 63 ==
From his experience with Il verri, Porta began collaborating with an avant-garde Italian movement called Gruppo 63. While working to develop their ideas, he travelled to the conventions they held in Palermo, Reggio Emilia, "La Sapienza", and Fano.

From 1963 to 1967, Porta was actively involved in the editing of another avant-garde magazine Malebolge from Reggio Emilia. In these years he also began working in visual poetry, participating in exhibitions in Padua, Rome, Milan, and London. His work which is most associated with this period is Zero (1963).

== Later career ==
He contributed as a literary critic for renowned Italian newspapers such as Corriere della Sera and Il Giorno and collaborated on Tuttolibri, Panorama, and L'Europeo. He was the director and active editor of the monthly Alfabeta and La Gola.

From 1982 to 1988, he taught at the D'Annunzio University of Chieti–Pescara, then at Yale, the University of Pavia, the Sapienza University of Rome, and the University of Bologna.

== Bibliography ==
- Calendario, Schwartz, Milan, 1956, under the pen name Leo Paolazzi
- La palpebra rovesciata, Azimuth, Milan, 1960
- I novissimi, il verri edition, Milan, 1961
- Zero, numbered edition, in proprio, Milan, 1963
- Aprire, poems, All'Insegna del Pesce d'Oro, Milan, 1964
- I rapporti, poems, Feltrinelli Editore, Milan, 1966
- Partita, novel, Feltrinelli Editore, Milan, 1967
- Cara, poems, Feltrinelli Editore, Milan, 1969
- Metropolis, poems, Feltrinelli Editore, Milan, 1971 (finalist for the Viareggio Prize)
- Week-end, poems, Cooperativa Scrittori Editrice, Rome 1974
- La presa di potere di Ivan lo sciocco, play, Einaudi Editore, Turin, 1974
- Quanto ho da dirvi, collection of all his poetry from 1958 to 1975, Feltrinelli Editore, Milano, 1977
- Il re del magazzino, novel, Arnoldo Mondadori Editore, Milan, 1978
- Pin Pidìn, poems of today for kids (with Giovanni Raboni), Feltrinelli Editore, Milan, 1978
- Passi Passaggi, poems, Arnoldo Mondadori Editore, Milan, 1980 (winner of the " Val di Comino" award, finalist for the D'Annunzio Prize)
- Se fosse tutto un tradimento, short story, Guanda Editore, Milan, 1981
- L'aria della fine, poems, Lunarionuovo, Catania, 1982 (winner of Gandovere Prize – Franciacorta)
- Emilio, small poems for children, Emme Edizioni, Milan, 1982
- La poesia che dice no, film for TV (RAI, Rai 3, directed by Gianni Jannelli), La Spezia, 1983
- Invasioni, poems, Arnoldo Mondadori Editore, Milan, 1984 (winner of the Viareggio Prize, and Città di Latina Prize)
- Nel fare poesia, anthologia with an introduction on his method of writing, Sansoni, Florence, 1985
- La stangata persiana, play, Corpo 10, Milan, 1985
- La festa del cavallo, play, Corpo 10, Milan, 1986
- Melusina, una ballata e diario, Crocetti Editore, Milan, 1987
- Il giardiniere contro il becchino, Arnoldo Mondadori Editore, Milan, 1988 (winner of the Carducci Prize, the Acireale Prize, and the Stefanile Prize)
- Partorire in chiesa, short story, Libri Scheiwiller, Milan, 1990
- Il Progetto Infinito, edited by Giovanni Raboni, Quaderni Pier Paolo Pasolini, Rome, 1991 (distributed by Garzanti)
- V Canto dell'inferno, edited by Daniele Oppi, Raccolto, Robecchetto con Induno (MI), 1991 with an artwork of Gianfranco Baruchello
- Los(t) angeles, unedited novel, Vallecchi Editore, Florence, 1996
- Poesie 1956-1988 edited by Niva Lorenzini, Oscar Mondadori, Milan, 1998
- Yellow, unedited poems, edited by Niva Lorenzini, Mondadori, Milan, 2002
- Tutte le poesie, edited by Niva Lorenzini, Garzanti, Milan, 2009
- La scomparsa del corpo, collection of all his short novels, Manni Editori, Lecce, 2010
- Piercing the Page: Selected Poems 1958-1989, edited with an introduction by Gian Maria Annovi and an essay by Umberto Eco, Otis – Seismicity, Los Angeles, 2012
