= Luigi Fontanella =

Italian poet

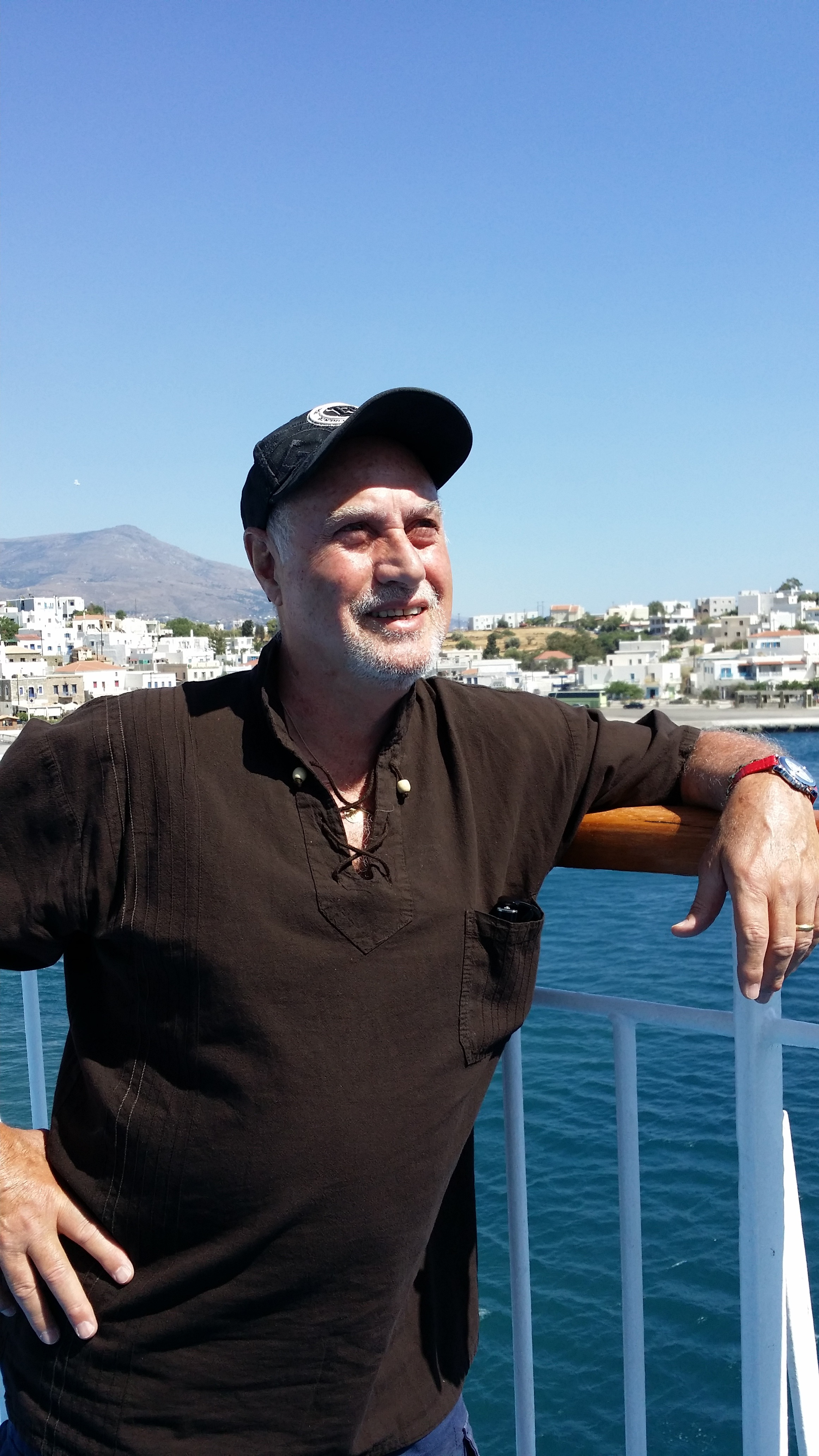
- Fontanella in 2014
- Born: Luigi Augusto Fontanella; 1943 (age 82–83); Salerno, Campania, Italy
- Education: Sapienza University of Rome; Harvard University (PhD)
- Occupations: Poet; critic; translator; playwright; novelist
- Children: 1

Luigi Augusto Fontanella (born 1943 Salerno, Italy) is an Italian poet, critic, translator, playwright, and novelist.

== Life ==
He was a student of Giacomo Debenedetti and after he graduated from the Sapienza University of Rome, he obtained a Ph.D. in Romance Languages and Literatures at Harvard University. He has taught at Columbia University, Princeton University, (where from 1976 to 1978, he held the position of Fulbright Fellow), and at Wellesley College.

He is currently Professor Emeritus of Italian Language and Literature at Stony Brook University.

He is the Founder and President of IPA (Italian Poetry in America), as well as the Senior Editor, for the publishing house Olschki, of Gradiva: An International Journal of Poetry, and Chief Editor of the publishing house of Gradiva Publications, which has recently received the National Prize for the Translation from the Ministry of Culture and the Catullo Prize.

He chairs the International Poetry Prize "Gradiva", founded in 2012.

He has published many collections of poetry, numerous essays and specialized articles, several volumes of literary criticism, and works of fiction, as well as being the author of screenplays, translations and theatrical works. He is literary critic of the newspaper "America Oggi" and collaborates with major national and international literary magazines. Cinematographer and playwright, he worked in the film Casanova by Federico Fellini.

In 2005 he was appointed Knight by the President of the Italian Republic, Carlo Azeglio Ciampi.

In 2014 he was awarded the Premio Nazionale Frascati Poesia alla Carriera for the poetry collection Disunita ombra (Archinto, RCS, 2013).

In 2015 he won the Pascoli Prize and the Viareggio-Giuria Prize for the volume of poems L'adolescenza e la notte (Passigli, 2015), subsequently translated into French, English, and German.

Luigi Fontanella lives on Long Island (New York), and in Florence, Italy. He is the father of Emma Fontanella, professional Pastry Chef based in Rome and in New York (YouTube: Emma's Goodies).

== Awards ==
- 1976-1978 Fulbright Fellow at Princeton University
- 1977 American Collegiate Poets First Prize, Foreign Language Category
- 1987 Alfonso Gatto Prize
- 1993 Ragusa Prize
- 1998 Orazio Caputo Prize
- 2000 Prize for Translation by the “Ministero dei Beni Culturali” Gradiva Publications
- 2000 Bordighera Poetry Prize
- 2000 Circe Sabaudia Prize
- 2000 Città di Atri Prize
- 2000 Minturnae Prize
- 2000 S. Andrea Prize
- 2005 Cavaliere della Repubblica italiana, Presidente Carlo Azeglio Ciampi
- 2008 Città di Marineo
- 2008 Laurentum Prize
- 2012 Prata Prize
- 2012 I Murazzi Prize
- 2014 Frascati Career Honor National Prize
- 2014 Catullo Prize
- 2015 Pascoli Prize
- 2015 Viareggio-Giuria Prize
- 2023 Camaiore Career

== Works ==
=== Literary criticism ===
- I campi magnetici di A.-Breton-P. Soupault (translation, introduction and notes). Rome: Newton Compton. 1979.
- Il Surrealismo Italiano. Rome: Bulzoni. 1983. American edition Harvard University. 1981.
- Tozzi in America. Rome: Bulzoni. 1986.
- La Parola Aleatoria. Florence: Ed. Le Lettere. 1992 ISBN 978-88-7166-079-0.
- Il filo verde di Ugo Betti. Camerino: Ed. Mierma. 1993.
- Storia di Bontempelli. Ravenna: Longo Editore. 1997. ISBN 88-8063-121-7.
- La Parola Transfuga: Scrittori Italiani Espatriati in America. Firenze: Cadmo, 2003 ISBN 978-88-7923-282-1.
- Pasolini rilegge Pasolini. Milan: Archinto. 2005. ISBN 88-7768-448-8.
- Giuseppe Berto: Thirty Years Later. Venice: Marsilio. 2009 ISBN 978-88-317-9903-4.
- Paolo Volponi L'inedito Di New York. Torino: Aragno Editore, 2012 ISBN 978-88-8419-565-4.
- Migrating Words. Italian Writers in the United States. New York: Bordighera Press, 2012 ISBN 978-1-59954-041-2.
- La coscienza di Zeno by Italo Svevo, Florence, Giunti Editore, 2017 ISBN 978-88-440-4782-5.
- Pasolini in New York, Translation by Michael Palma, New York: The Film Desk, 2019 ISBN 978-0-9994683-3-3.
- Raccontare la Poesia (1970-2020). Saggi, ricordi, testimonianze critiche, Bergamo: Moretti & Vitali, 2021 ISBN 978-88-7186-828-8

=== Poetry ===
- La verifica incerta. Roma: De Luca. 1972.
- La vita trasparente, 1973-1977. Venezia: Rebellato. 1978.
- Simulazione di reato. Manduria: Lacaita. 1979.
- Stella Saturnina. Roma: Ed. Il Ventaglio. 1989.
- Round Trip. Udine: Campanotto. 1991.
- Ceres. Formia: Caramanica Editore, 1996 ISBN 978-88-86261-36-4.
- Terra del Tempo. Bologna: Book Editore, 2000 ISBN 978-88-7232-357-1
- The Transparent Life and Other Poems. Translated by Michael Palma. Gradiva Publications. 2000. ISBN 978-1-892021-03-8.
- Angels of Youth. Translators: C. Lettieri and I. Marchegiani Jones. Riverside, Calif.: Xenos Books. 2000. ISBN 1-879378-43-4.
- Azul. Milan: Archinto Ed., 2001. ISBN 978-88-7768-388-5.
- Land of Time: Selected Poems 1972-2003. Chelsea Editions. 2006. ISBN 978-0-9725271-3-2.
- L'azzurra memora. Poesie 1970-2005 Bergamo-Milan: Moretti & Vitali. 2007. Città di Marineo Prize, Laurentum Prize. ISBN 978-88-7186-339-9.
- Oblivion [Note by Giovanni Raboni]. Milano: Archinto. 2008. ISBN 978-8877685018.
- Bertgang [Introduction by Giancarlo Pontiggia, Afterword by Carla Stroppa]. Bergamo: Moretti & Vitali, 2012. Prata Prize, I Murazzi Prize. ISBN 978-88-7186-510-2.
- Disunita Ombra [Introduction by Sebastiano Aglieco, Note by Paolo Lagazzi]. Milan: Archinto, 2013. ISBN 978-88-7768-611-4.
- L'adolescenza e la notte [Introduction by Paolo Lagazzi]. Florence: Passigli, 2015. Pascoli Prize, Viareggio-Jury Prize. ISBN 978-88-368-1482-4.
- La morte rosa [Preface by Maurizio Cucchi]. Azzate, Varese: Stampa 2009, 2015. ISBN 978-88-8336-307-8.
- L'adolescence et la nuit [Introduction by Paolo Lagazzi]. Santec: RAZ éditions, 2015, Pascoli Prize, Viareggio-Jury Prize. ISBN 978-2-37517-004-5.
- Lo scialle rosso. Poemetti e racconti in versi, Bergamo: Moretti & Vitali, 2017, ISBN 978-88-7186-684-0.
- Monte Stella, Poesie 2014-2019, Bagno a Ripoli (Firenze), Passigli Editori, 2020 ISBN 978-88-368-1755-9.
- Adolescence and Night, Burlington, VT, Fomite Press, 2021 ISBN 978-1-953236-02-9
- Dell'ultimo orizzonte. Poesie scelte (1970-2021), Novara, Interlinea Edizioni, 2023, Camaiore Career Prize. ISBN 978-88-6857-505-2
- O stea în seara asta / Una stella stasera (tr. in rumeno di Eliza Macadan), Bacău, Cosmopoli, 2024. ISBN 978-630-6567-78-2.
- Lo sperdimento e altro 2019-2024, Firenze, Passigli Ed., 2025. Prefazione di Sergio Givone. Postfazione di Sebastiano Aglieco. ISBN 978-88-368-2134-1.

=== Fiction and theater ===
- Milestone e altre storie Siena-Rome: Il Messapo. 1983.
- Hot Dog. Roma: Bulzoni. 1986. English Translation by Justin Vitiello, Preface by Giose Rimanelli, Lewiston, N.Y.: Ed. Soleil. 1998 ISBN 0-921831-52-8.
- Controfigura, Venezia: Marsilio. 2009. ISBN 978-88-317-9887-7.
- Il dio di New York, Firenze: Passigli Editori, 2017 ISBN 978-88-368-1584-5.
- Tre passi nel desiderio. Tre Atti Unici, Torino: Neos Edizioni, 2021 ISBN 978-88-6608-399-3
- The God of New York, (tr. by Siân E. Gibby), New York: Bordighera Press, 2022. ISBN 978-1-59954-177-8

== Reviews and selected bibliography ==
=== Reviews ===
- ...his most recent poetry is like a rare hothouse flower blooming in Fontanella's garden, laid out like a golf course, with surprising bridges between pleasure and reflection which, in the end, enliven both author and readers. Fontanella is essentially the transcriber of unique lyric moments in a poetic corpus that is neither too fertile (abundant) nor too facile (redundant), yet shines with a contemporary relevance that carries it well beyond its cycles of conception and completion. (Giose Rimanelli)
- There's great freedom of forms and intonations in Luigi Fontanella's poetry. He doesn't take a strong formal stand; his poetry entertains moments of nearly proselike colloquial narrative along with moments of powerful lyrical tension. There's a movement of extremes, from powerful tonality to near atonality, and I like this a great deal; it's a stance that very effectively catches the spirit that makes work in poetry possible nowadays. (Giovanni Raboni)

=== Selected bibliography for poetry ===
- Leonardo Mancino, in Fermenti, pp. 11–12, November 1978.
- Fabio Doplicher, in Carte Segrete, p. 43, March 1979.
- Mario Lunetta, in Il Messaggero, September 10, 1979.
- Francesco Paolo Memmo, in Paese Sera, August 22, 1980.
- Filippo Bettini, in L'Ora, October 9, 1980.
- Giuliano Manacorda, in Letteratura italiano d'oggi: 1965-1985. Roma, Editori Riuniti, 1987.
- Remo Ceserani e Lidia De Federicis, in Il materiale e l'immaginario, vol. IX, Torino, Loescher, 1988.
- Rodolfo Di Biasio, in Otto/Novecento, March–April 1990.
- Michele Sovente, in La poesia in Campania, Forlì, p. 160, Forum/Quinta Generazione, 1990.
- Manuela Bertone, in Otto/Novecento, XV, January–February 1991.
- Roberto Deidier, in Rivista di Studi Italiani, June–December 1991.
- Giulio Ferroni, "L'eterno ritorno del pendolare", in Verso, December 1993.
- Giuliano Manacorda, Storia della letteratura italiana contemporanea 1940-1996, pp. 805–806, Editori Riuniti, 1996.
- Irene Marchegiani, in "Italian History & Culture", Georgetown University, vol. 5, 1999.
- Alessandro Fo, in Il campo, March 23, 2000.
- Milo De Angelis, Nota per Terra del Tempo, Book Editore, June 2000.
- Dante Maffia, in Poesia, p. 144, November 2000.
- Franco Buffoni, in Testo a Fronte, p .23, December 2000.
- Maurizio Cucchi, in La Stampa, May 9, 2001.
- Alberto Toni, in Letture, p. 579, August–September 2001.
- Franco Marcoaldi, in La Repubblica, November 19, 2001.
- Giovanni Raboni, in Paragone, pp. 36–37-38, August–December 2001.
- Giancarlo Pontiggia, in Poesia, p. 157, January 2002.
- Vincenzo Guarracino, in Testuale, p. 33, Fall 2002.
- Gianfranco Lauretano, in Graphie, p. 2, August 2003.
- Aldo Gerbino, in La Sicilia, January 6, 2004.
- Maurizio Cucchi, in Dizionario, La Stampa, September 30, 2005.
- Dante Della Terza, Introduction to Land of Time, Chelsea Editions, May 2006.
- Giulio Ferroni, in Storia della Letteratura italiana 1968-2005, Milano, Mondadori, 2006.
- Felice Piemontese, in Il Mattino, May 22, 2007.
- Achille Serrao, in Periferie, p. 43, July–September 2007.
- Maurizio Cucchi, in La Gazzetta di Parma, October 13, 2007.
- Paolo Lagazzi, in Poesia, p. 222, December 2007.
- Alessandro Carrera, in L'immaginazione, p. 235, December 2007.
- Alberto Toni, in Letture, p. 645, March 2008.
- Elio Grasso, in Capoverso, p. 16, July–December 2008.
- Ned Condini, in Modern Italian Poetry, MLAA, 2009.
- Carlangelo Mauro, in Studi Novecenteschi, p. 77, January–June 2009.
- Carlo di Lieto, in Misure Critiche, pp. 1–2, December 2009.
- Felice Piemontese, in Il Mattino, April 4, 2010.
- Filippo La Porta, in Left-Avvenimenti, June 11, 2010.
- Sebastiano Aglieco, in Capoverso, p. 24, July–December 2012.
- Mario Fresca, in Levania, p. 1, October 2012.
- Filippo La Porta, in Left, L'Unità, June 14, 2014.
- Alessandra Paganardi, in Poesia, p. 302, March 2015.
- Stefano Lanuzza, in Retroguardia, July 31, 2015.
- Paolo Lagazzi, in La Gazzetta di Parma, November 25, 2015.
- Alessandra Paganardi, in Forum Italicum, vol. 50, May 2016.
- Giancarlo Pontiggia, in Testo, p. 71, January–June, 2016.
- Alessandra Paganardi, in Poesia, p. 326, May 2017.
- Carlangelo Mauro, in Liberi di dire. Saggi su poeti contemporanei. Seconda serie, Avellino, Sinestesie, 2017.
- Francesco Filia, in Poetarum Silva, February 12, 2018.
- Francesco Capaldo, in Picklime, July 2, 2020.
- Maurizio Cucchi, in La Repubblica, July 18, 2020.
- Lino Angiuli, in La Gazzetta del Mezzogiorno, August 14, 2020.
- Paolo Lagazzi, in La Gazzetta di Parma, September 25, 2020.
- Silvio Aman, in America Oggi, October 4, 2020.
- Michele Brancale, in La Nazione, "Robinson" October 13, 2020.
- Salvatore Violante, in Il Sarto di Ulm, n.4, 2020.
- Marco Vitale, in Succedeoggi, October 27, 2020.
- Carlangelo Mauro, in Atelier, November 24, 2020.
- Alessandra Paganardi, in Italian Quarterly, Fall 2020.
- Stelvio Di Spigno, in Civilità Magazine, December 24, 2020.
- Marco Vitale, in Succedeoggi, March 5, 2021.
- Enzo Rega, in L'indice dei libri, June 2021.
- Michele Brancale, in Avvenire, September 9, 2021.
- Ivano Mugnaini, in Dedalus, September 9, 2021.
- Franco Borrelli, in America Oggi, September 19, 2021.
- Giancarlo Pontiggia, in L'Immaginazione, n. 328, March–April 2022.
- Salvatore Violante, in Capoverso, n. 45, January–June 2023.
- Sebastiano Aglieco, in Compitu Re Vivi, July 3, 2023.
- Maurizio Cucchi, in Robinson, La Repubblica, August 12, 2023.
- Paolo Lagazzi, in Avvenire, August 20, 2023.
- Pasquale Di Palmo, in Ytali, September 3, 2023.
- Anthony Julian Tamburri, Living Biculturalism Writing Transculturalism, New Fairfield, CT, 2025. ISBN 978-1-955995-13-9

Complete bibliography for poetry up to 2018 in La Poesia di Luigi Fontanella, edited by B. Vincenzi, Cosenza: Macabor, 2018, ISBN 978-88-85582-17-0. Contributions by S. Aglieco, S. Aman, A. Carrera, S. D'Amaro, M. De Angelis, C. Di Lieto, G. Ferroni, F. Filia, B. Garavelli, E. Grasso, F. La Porta, C. Mauro, I. Mugnaini, A. Paganardi, G. Pontiggia, E. Rega, R. Urraro, S. Violante.
