= Valerio Magrelli =

Italian poet

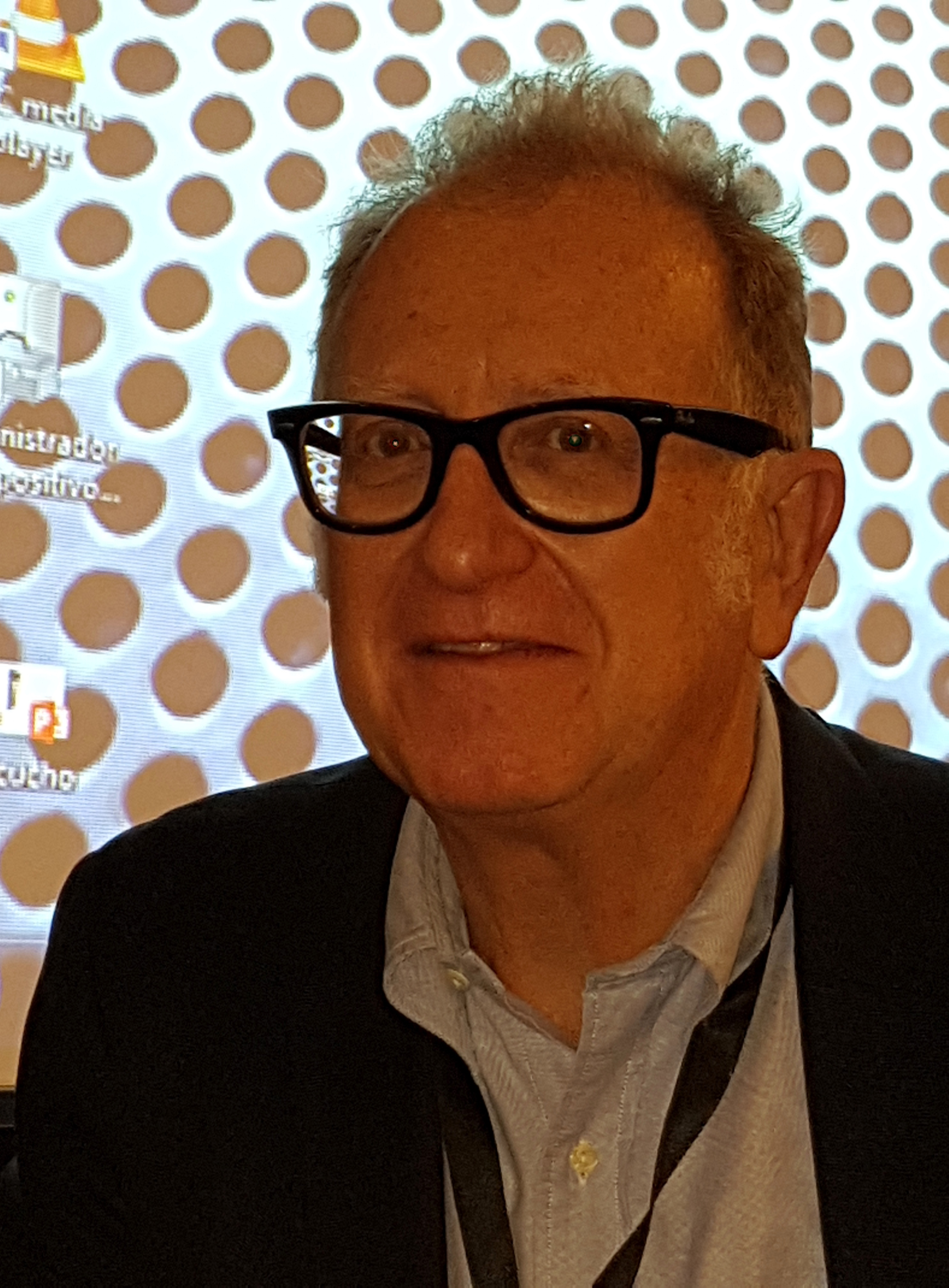
- Valerio Magrelli at the Santiago International Book Fair 2017
- Born: January 10, 1957 (age 69); Rome, Italy
- Known for: poetry;

Valerio Magrelli (born 10 January 1957, Rome) is an Italian poet.

He graduated in philosophy at the University of Rome and is an expert in French literature which he has taught and teaches at the University of Pisa and University of Cassino. He debuted as an author at age twenty-three with a collection of poems entitled Ora serrata retinae.

He received the Viareggio Prize, and the Mondello Prize.

== Works ==
=== Books ===
- Ora serrata retinae (Feltrinelli, 1980, preface by Enzo Siciliano);
- Nature e venature (Mondadori, 1987) ISBN 88-04-29911-8
- Esercizi di tiptologia (Mondadori, 1992) ISBN 88-04-35584-0
- Ora serrata retinae e Nature e venature nella collezione Poesie (1980-1992) e altre poesie (Einaudi, 1996) ISBN 88-06-14080-9
- Didascalie per la lettura di un giornale (Einaudi, 1999) ISBN 88-06-15148-7
- Nel condominio di carne (Einaudi, 2003), ISBN 88-06-16667-0
- Disturbi del sistema binario (Einaudi, 2006) ISBN 88-06-18213-7
- La vicevita. Treni e viaggi in treno (Laterza, 2009) ISBN 978-88-420-8883-7
- Addio al calcio. Novanta racconti da un minuto (Einaudi, 2010), ISBN 978-88-06-20479-2
- Geologia di un padre (Einaudi, 2013) ISBN 978-88-06-20339-9
- Il sangue amaro (Einaudi, collezione di poesia, 2014) ISBN 978-88-06-21845-4
- Lo sciamano di famiglia. Omeopatia, pornografia, regia in 77 disegni di Fellini (Laterza, 2015) ISBN 978-88-581-2064-4
- Le cavie: poesie, 1980-2018, Einaudi, Torino 2018 ISBN 978-8806239473
- Il commissario Magrelli, Einaudi, Torino 2018 ISBN 978-8806240295
- La vicevita, Einaudi, Torino 2019 ISBN 978-8806240660
