= Antonella Anedda =

Italian poet and essayist

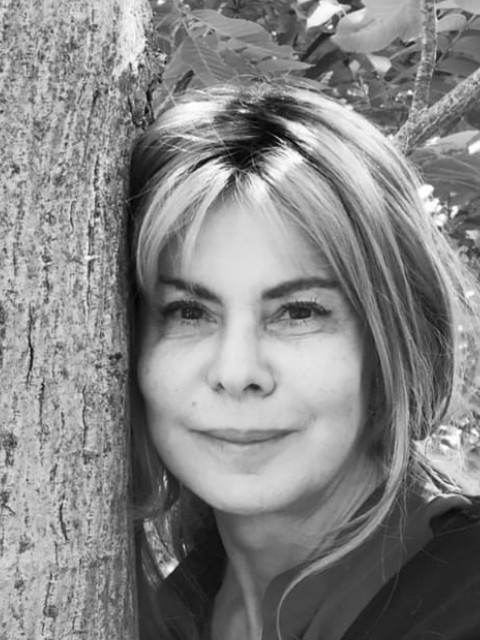
Image of Antonella Anedda

Antonella Anedda (born 22 December 1955) is an Italian poet and essayist.

== Biography ==
Of Sardinian and Corsican descent, she was born in Rome and was educated there and in Venice, receiving a degree in the history of modern art from Sapienza University of Rome. Anedda received a scholarship from the Cini Foundation. She worked for the Museo nazionale delle arti e tradizioni popolari in Rome and taught at the University of Siena and the University of Lugano. Anedda has also participated in radio programs for Rai 3. Her work has appeared in various magazines such as alfabeta2, Rinascita, Ipso facto and Doppiozero and she has contributed articles on art criticism to various magazines and newspapers.

Her first volume of poetry Residenze invernali (1992) received the Premio Sinisgalli, the Premio Diego Valeri and the Tratti Poetry Prize. Her collection Notti di pace occidentale (1999) received the Premio Internazionale Montale for poetry. Her work has also been included in various anthologies and has been translated into various languages including Japanese, Korean, Hebrew, Spanish, French and English.

Anedda translated some prose by Philippe Jaccottet for the volume Appunti per una semina (1994).

She participated with an installation and a performance at the exhibition Lontano da dove at the Macro Museum in Testaccio (Pelanda). In 2013 one of her texts written for Nicoletta Braschi, entitled A Lunar Woman, was staged in Rome under the direction of Francesco Saponaro and was published in a plaquette with engravings by Lino Fiorito. In 2014 she collaborated on the book Una forma di attenzione alongside artist Sabrina Mezzaqui, which follows the study day entitled Incollare mondi, cucire parole. Anedda, Blandiana, Gisiger, Mezzaqui (edited by Rossana Dedola) held at the Scuola Normale di Pisa in 2010.

In September 2019, she was awarded an honorary PhD by the University of Paris Sorbonne IV. She was a contributor to A New Divan: A Lyrical Dialogue Between East and West. ISBN 9781909942288

== Selected works ==
- Cosa sono gli anni, essays & short stories (1997)
- Nomi distanti, translated works by Ovid, Sappho, Philippe Jaccottet and others (1998)
- La luce delle cose, essays and short stories (2000)
- Il catalogo della gioia, poetry (2003)
- Don’t Waste my Beauty/Non guastare la mia bellezza, works by Barbara Carle, co-translator and co-editor, (2006)
- Salva con nome, poetry (2012), received the Viareggio Prize, the Premio Pascoli and the Premio Alghero Donna
- Archipelago, bilingual selection translated by Jamie McKendrick (Bloodaxe Books, 2014), awarded the John Florio Translation Prize 2014 and a Poetry Book Society Recommended Translation, 9781780371085
- Isolatria (Laterza Editore, 2013) 9781780371085
- Historiae (Einaudi, 2018)

== Bibliography in English ==
- Adele Bardazzi, 'Textile Poetics of Entanglement: The Works of Antonella Anedda and Maria Lai', in polisemie: rivista di poesia iper-contemporanea, III (2022), pp. 81-115.
