= Alfredo de Palchi =

American poet

Alfredo Giop de Palchi (born December 13, 1926 Verona, Italy – August 6, 2020) was an Italian poet and translator.

== Life ==
He grew up in Legnago, Verona, Italy. He was a political prisoner from the Spring of 1945 until the Spring of 1951. From 1951 to 1956 he lived in Paris, France and in Spain. In 1952 he married Sonia Raiziss, and with her, edited Chelsea magazine from 1960 on. On October 12, 1956, he arrived in New York City. He was trustee of the Sonia Raiziss Giop Charitable Foundation. He was a judge for the Raiziss/de Palchi Translation Awards. He lived in Union Square, New York City with his wife Rita and daughter Luce. He was the publisher of the non-profit Chelsea Editions. A lecture series was named for him at the University of Hartford.

== Works ==
=== Poetry ===
==== English Bibliography ====
- Sessions With My Analyst. Translated by Isidore Lawrence Salomon. October House. 1971. ISBN 978-0-8079-0167-0.
- The Scorpion's Dark Dance. Translated by Sonia Raiziss. Xenos Books. 1993. ISBN 978-1-879378-06-3.
- Anonymous Constellation. Translated by Sonia Raiziss. Xenos Books. 1997. ISBN 978-1-879378-23-0.
- Addictive Aversions. Translated by Sonia Raiziss; et al. Xenos Books. 1999. ISBN 978-1-879378-38-4.

==== Italian Bibliography ====
- Sessioni con l'analista. Mondadori. 1967.
- Mutazioni. Campanotto. 1988.
- Costellazione anonima. Caramanica. 1998.
- In cao del me paese. West Press Editrice. 2001.
- Paradigma. Caramanica. 2001.
- Paradigma - Tutte le poesie: 1947-2005. Mimesis/Hebenon. 2006.
- Foemina tellus. Jocker editore. 2010.
- Nihil. Stampa 2009. 2016.

=== Editor ===
- Willis Barnstone; Patricia Terry; Arthur S. Wensinger; Kimon Friar; Sonia Raiziss; Alfredo De Palchi; George Reavey; Angel Flores, eds. (1978). Modern European Poetry. Bantam Books.

== Bibliography ==
- A Life Gambled in Poetry. Homage to Alfredo de Palchi, Edited by Luigi Fontanella, Stony Brook, New York: Gradiva Publications, 2011. Contributions by: S. Aglieco, D. Bisutti, L. Bonaffini, B. Carle, N. Condini, M. De Angelis, G. Fantato, A. Ferramosca, G. Ferri, L. Fontanella, D. Gioseffi, K. Kvitko, A. Macchia, V. Magrelli, G. Malanga, L. Manzi, I. Marchegiani, S. Montalto, M. Moroni, M. Palma, G. Panella, P. Perilli, S. Ramat, V. Surliuga, A.J. Tamburri, J. Taylor, P. Valduga, P. Valesio, A. Zagaroli.
- The Poetry of Alfredo De Palchi. An Interview and Three Essays by Giuseppe Panella (translated from the Italian by James Alden), New York, Chelsea Editions, 2013.
