= Pontiggia =

Pontiggia is an Italian surname. Notable people with the surname include:

- Elena Pontiggia (July 1955), Italian art critic and professor
- Giuseppe Pontiggia (1934–2003), Italian writer and literary critic
- Simone Pontiggia (born 1993), Italian footballer
