= Paola Masino =

Italian writer (1908–1989)

- Born: 20 May 1908; Pisa
- Died: 27 July 1989 (aged 81); Rome

Paola Masino (20 May 1908 – 27 July 1989) was an Italian writer, translator and librettist.

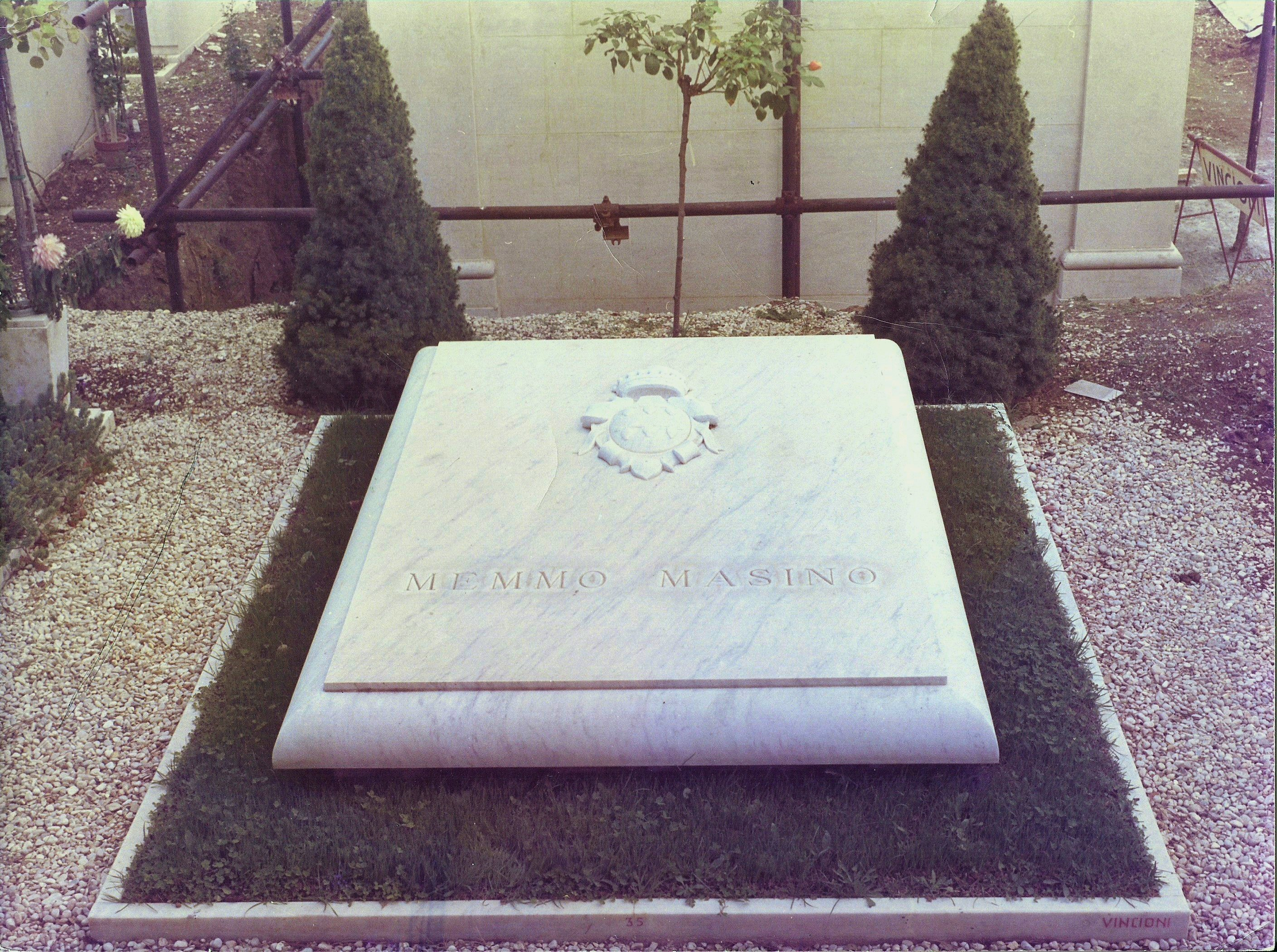
Tomb of Paola Masino.

== Biography ==
Paola Masino was born as the second child of Enrico Masino and the aristocrat Luisa Sforza, who moved to Rome a few years after her birth. Paola Masino lived in a family environment that had a passion for literature and music. She was introduced by her father, from a very young age, to reading the classics and listening to her favourites Beethoven, Mozart and Wagner. In 1924 she wrote a drama, Le tre Marie, which she introduced to Pirandello, encouraged by her father, receiving vague signs of encouragement.

In March 1927 she met Massimo Bontempelli, who was separated from his wife and thirty years older than her, with whom she began a relationship, opposed by her family, and a literary collaboration: Paola collaborated with the magazine 900, directed by Bontempelli, and together they wrote the drama, never published, Il naufragio del Titanic.

Having moved to Florence in 1929 and then to Paris with Bontempelli, she worked as an editorial secretary for " L'Europe Nouvelle " and at the Bureau International de Coopération Intellectuelle, frequenting Italian and foreign intellectuals and artists who were present in France at that time, such as Il'ja Ehrenburg, Ramón Gómez de la Serna, Paul Valéry, Max Jacob, André Maurois, André Gide, Emil Ludwig, Giorgio de Chirico, Alberto Savinio, Luigi Pirandello, Guido Peyron, Filippo De Pisis, Nino Bertoletti, Pasquarosa Marcelli Bertoletti, Giovanni Comisso, Adriana Pincherle, Onofrio Martinelli, Arturo Loria; she also met and became friends with Joséphine Baker, the Russian painter Polia Chentoff, of whom she spoke extensively in the volume "Album di abiti" and with Kiki de Montparnasse. In Paris, on May 29, 1930, de Pisis painted her portrait, one of the very few reserved by the painter for female figures. Returning to Rome in 1931, she published the stories Decadenza della morte and the novel Monte Ignoso, with which she obtained recognition at the Viareggio Prize.

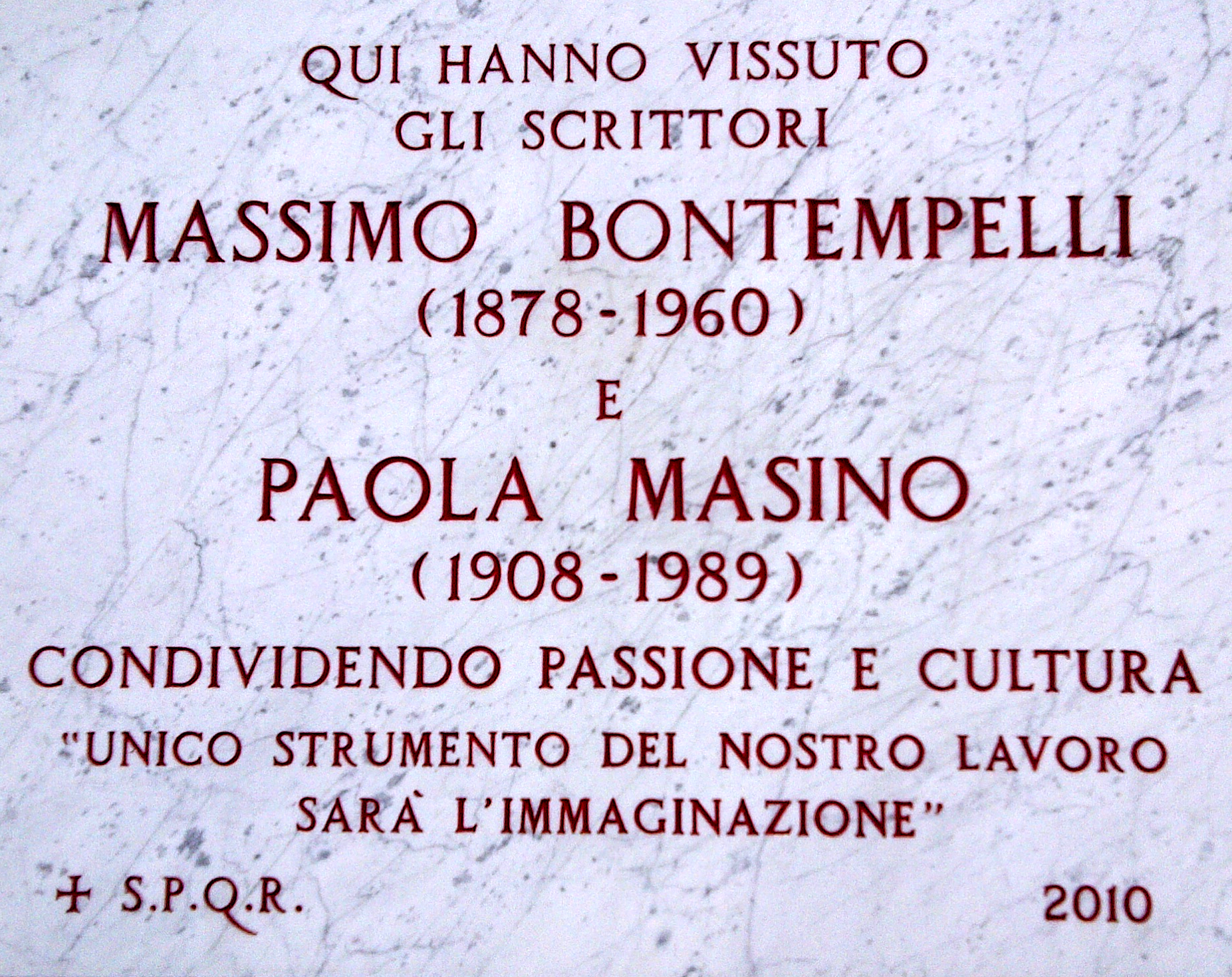
Commemorative plaque of Massimo Bontempelli and Paola Masino.

This was followed in 1933 by the novel Periferia, written in the style of magical realism, which won the second prize at the "Viareggio" but was not liked by the fascist censors, who found it to be critical of the regime. Bontempelli, an Italian academic since 1931, also began to distance himself from fascism until his open criticisms led to his expulsion from the Italian Fascist Party and in 1939 a sort of exile in Venice, where Masino followed him, going to live in Palazzo Contarini delle Figure. Here, in early 1940, he completed the new novel Nascita e morte della massaia which appeared in installments in the weekly "Tempo": this too was unwelcome to the Regime, and its publication was prevented, which only took place in 1945.

With the fall of Mussolini in July 1943, Paola and Massimo Bontempelli returned to Rome, where at the end of the year they learned of the death sentence decreed by the new regime of Salò for Bontempelli and of the exile for Paola: they hid in the house of friends until the liberation of Rome, in June 1944. Together with Alberto Moravia, Alberto Savinio and Guido Piovene they founded the weekly «Città» then moved to Milan and became closer to the Communist Party: dealing with political and social issues, Paola collaborated with the magazines Spazio, Epoca, 1945, Crimen, Foemina, Mercurio, Noi donne and Vie Nuove. She followed the reconstituted Venice Film Festival as a correspondent and was part of the jury in the 1949 edition, while in 1947 a collection of her poems was published .

In 1950 Paola and Massimo Bontempelli left Venice and returned permanently to Rome: Paola collaborated with RAI, composed opera librettos, devoted herself to translations, continued to write the Appunti notebooks and, after Bontempelli's death in 1960, she worked on Massimo's writings for a two-volume edition of his works. She also kept a diary, translated Balzac, Valery Larbaud, Jean Cocteau, Hector Malot, JA Barbey d'Aurevilly, Geneviève Tabouis, Madame de La Fayette and Stendhal and composed a long autobiography entitled "Album di abiti", which she inserted into the Appunti notebooks that she had been writing. Her last work is the poem Ninna nanna, published in 1966 by the magazine « La Battana ». Paola Masino dies, forgotten, on 27 July 1989. The volumes "Colloquio di notte" were published posthumously in 1994, collecting the stories published in magazines in the 30s and 40s, as well as three unpublished stories, "Io, Massimo e gli altri-autobiografia di una figlie del secolo" in 1995, "Cinquale ritrovato" in 2004, which collects three previously published stories and in 2015 the volume "Album di abiti". In 2001 the Arnoldo and Alberto Mondadori Foundation published an important biographical catalogue, on the occasion of a large exhibition and a conference on Paola, inaugurated by President Carlo Azeglio Ciampi at the Casa delle Letterature in Rome. On July 16, 2010, the Municipality of Rome placed a commemorative plaque on the house at Viale Liegi 6, Rome, where Paola Masino lived until her death. She is buried in Rome in the Cimitero Flaminio.

== Works ==
=== Novels and Memoirs ===
- Monte Ignoso, Bompiani, Milan, 1931; il Melangolo, Genoa, 1994, afterword by Mauro Bersani; Francesco Rossi, Carrara, 2004; German translation of "Monte Ignoso " by Dora Mitzky, Berlin-Wien-Leipzig, Paul Zsolnay Verlag, 1933;
- Periferia, Bompiani, Milan, 1933; Oedipus editore, Salerno, 2016, introduction and edited by Marinella Mascia Galateria; German translation by Richard Hoffmann, " Spiele am Abgrund (Games on the Abyss)", Berlin-Wien-Leipzig, Paul Zsolnay Verlag, 1935;
- Nascita e morte della massaia, Bompiani, Milan, 1945; Bompiani, Milan, 1970, introduction by Cesare Garboli; la Tartaruga, Milan, 1982, introduction by Silvia Giacomoni, Isbn, Milan, 2009, with an essay by Marina Zancan; Feltrinelli, 2019, preface by Nadia Fusini, note to the text and biographical note by Elisa Gambaro German translation by Maja Pflug, "", Frauenbuchverlag, Munich, 1983; English translation and introduction by Marella Feltrin Morris, " Birth and Death of the Housewife ", Albany, New York, State University of New York Press (SUNY), 2009; French translation by Marilène Raiola, preface by Marinella Mascia Galateria, appendix by Marilène Raiola, "La Massaia, Naissance et mort de la fée du foyer", Editions de la Martinière, Paris, 2018; Spanish translation by Pepa Linares, introduction by Marinella Mascia Galateria, "Nacimiento y muerte del ama de casa", AlianzaLIt Edition, Madrid 2019; Portuguese translation, introduction by Nadia Fusini, afterword by Francesca Cricelli, "Nascimento e morte da dona de casa";
- Io, Massimo e gli altri. Autobiografia di una figlia del secolo, edited by Maria Vittoria Vittori, Rusconi Editore, Milan, 1995;
- Album di vestiti, introduction and edited by Marinella Mascia Galateria, Elliot, Rome, 2015.

=== Stories and novellas ===
- Decadenza della morte, presentation by Massimo Bontempelli, Alberto Stock, Rome, 1931;
- Racconto grosso e altri, Bompiani, Milan, 1941; Rina Edizioni, 2021, with a preface by Marinella Mascia Galateria;
- Dialoghi della vita armonica, Editoriale Domus, Milan, 1942;
- Colloquio di notte, preface by Maria Rosa Cutrufelli, introduction and edited by Maria Vittoria Vittori, Edizioni La luna, Palermo, 1994;
- Cinquale ritrovato, edited by Corrado Giunti, afterword by Marinella Mascia Galateria, Francesco Rossi Editore, Carrara, 2004;
- Anniversario, edited by and with an afterword by Marinella Mascia Galateria, Elliot, Rome, 1916;

=== Poetry ===
- Poesie, Bompiani, Milan, 1947;

=== Opera librettos ===
- Viaggio d'Europa, from the story of the same name by Massimo Bontempelli, music by Vittorio Rieti. First performance: Auditorium della Rai in Rome, 9 April 1955.
- Vivì (with Bindo Missiroli), lyrical drama in 3 acts and 6 scenes, music by Franco Mannino, De Santis, Rome 1956; Curci, Milan, 1962. First performance: Teatro San Carlo in Naples, 28 March 1957.
- Luisella, drama in 4 acts based on the story of the same name by Thomas Mann, music by Franco Mannino, Ricordi, Milan, 1969. First performance: Teatro Massimo in Palermo, 28 February 1969.
- La Madrina, from the story of the same name by Oscar Vadislas de Lubicz Milosz, music by Cesare Brero. First performance: Auditorium della Rai in Rome, 19 July 1973.
- Il ritratto di Dorian Gray, (with Beppe de Tomasi), drama in two acts and 8 scenes from the novel of the same name by Oscar Wilde, music by Franco Mannino, Curci, Milan, 1974. First performance: Teatro Massimo Bellini in Catania, 12 January 1982.

=== Theater ===
- (with Massimo Bontempelli) The sinking of the Titanic, drama written between 1928 and 1929;

=== Translations from French ===
- Geneviève Tabouis, Sibari, The Greeks in Italy, Sansoni Publisher, Florence, 1958;
- Valery Larbaud, AOBarnabooth: his complete works: The poor shirtmaker, Poems, Diary, Bompiani, Milan, 1969; Publisher L'editore, 1990;
- Honoré de Balzac, The Girl with the Golden Eyes, Einaudi, Turin, 1977;
- (with Massimo Bontempelli) Stendhal, Memories of Egotism, Mina di Vanghel, Vanina Vanini, Curcio, Rome, 1978;
- JA Barbey d'Aurevilly, Il Cavaliere des Touches, Armando Curcio Editore, Rome, 1979;
- Hector Malot, Without Family, Giunti Marzocco Editore, Florence, 1979;
- (with Gesualdo Bufalino), Madame de La Fayette, Jealous Love. Three Stories, Sellerio, Palermo, 1980.

=== Curated by ===
- Massimo Bontempelli, Stories and Novels, 2 volumes edited by Paola Masino, Mondadori, Milan 1961

== RAI Radio Programs ==
- Writers at the microphone, Paola Masino, meetings with the character, Tuesday 27 February 1951, red network 22, 25

== Bibliography ==
- Paola Blelloch, 'From trunk to grave. The hallucinated story of a housewife', in "Nemla Italian Studies", Rutgers University, XIII, XIV, 1989–1990
- Lucia Re, 'Fascist Theories of Woman and the Construction of Gender', University of Minnesota Press, 1995
- Maria Vittoria Vittori, 'Case – Ritratto di Paola Masino', in "Idra", VI, 12, Milano, 1995
- Rita Guerricchio, 'Sulla narrativa di Paola Masino', in "Idra", VI, 12, Milano, 1995
- Laura Fortini, 'Il Lucifero delle Massaie', in "DWF", 1 (33), Roma, 1997
- Giamila Yehia, 'Paola Masino. il mestiere di scrittrice', in "Avanguardia", IV, 10, Roma, 1999
- Fulvia Airoldi Namer, 'La terra e la discesa: l'immaginario di Paola Masino', in "Otto/Novecento", 3, Milano, 2001
- Marinella Mascia Galateria, 'L'autobiografia trasfigurata di Paola Masino', in "Avanguardia", VI, 17, Roma, 2001
- Giamila Yehia, 'Tra sogno e scrittura: Poi Giovanni, romanzo incompiuto di Paola Masino', in "Avanguardia", VI, 17, Roma, 2001
- Beatrice Manetti, 'Una carriera à rebours-i quaderni d'appunti di Paola Masino', Edizioni dell'Orso, Alessandria, 2001
- Francesca Bernardini Napoletano e Marinella Mascia Galateria (a cura) 'Paola Masino', Milano, Fondazione Arnoldo e Alberto Mondadori, 2001
- Rita Guerricchio, 'Il realismo magico di Paola Masino', in "Finzioni e Confessioni-Passaggi letterari nel Novecento italiano", Liguori Editore, 2001
- Manuela Gieri, 'Paola Masino', in "Italian prose writers, 1900–1945", Edizioni Luca Somigli & Rocco Capozzi, Detroit, 2002
- Giuliano Manacorda, 'Paola Masino', in "La fama e il silenzio – scrittrici dimenticate del Primo Novecento", Marsilio Editori, 2002
- Eleonora Chiti, 'Un varco nella nursery, Pamela Lyndon Travers, Annie Vivanti, Paola Masino', in "La perturbante, das Unheimliche nella scrittura delle donne", Morlacchi, Perugia, 2003
- Tristana Rorandelli, 'Nascita e morte della massaia di Paola Masino e la questione del corpo materno nel fascismo', in "Forum Italicum", 37, 1, 2003
- Flora Maria Ghezo, 'Fiamme e follia, ovvero la morte della madre arcaica in Monte Ignoso di Paola Masino', in "Esperienze letterarie", XXIII, 3, 2003
- Marella Feltrin-Morris, 'Words in flight: Paola Masino's vision of word', 80th AATI American Association Teachers of Italian, Philadelphia Convention Center, Novembre 2003
- Beatrice Manetti, 'Modelli di donne e lettrici reali nella pubblicistica di Paola Masino', in "Il Ponte", anno LIX,12, 2003
- Franca Caspani Menghini, ' Dal baule alla bara: il doppio itinerario di una massaia incompresa. Storia e analisi del testo di Nascita e morte della Massaia di Paola Masino', Università di Zurigo, 2003
- Marinella Mascia Galateria, 'Paola Masino', in "Italiane", Presidenza del Consiglio dei Ministri, Roma, 2003
- Louise Rozier, 'Il mito e l'allegoria nella narrativa di Paola Masino', The Edwin Mellen Press, Lewiston, New York, 2004
- Francesca Bernardini Napoletano (a cura), 'L'archivio di Paola Masino – Inventario', Università La Sapienza, Roma, 2004
- Lucia Re, Fame, cibo e antifascismo nella Massaia di Paola Masino In Il cibo e le donne nella cultura e nella storia: prospettive interdisciplinari, a cura di Giuseppina Muzzarelli e Lucia Re (Bologna: CLUEB, Biblioteca di Scienze umane, 2005), pp. 165–182.
- Allison Cooper, 'Gender, Identity and the Return to Order in the early Works of Paola Masino', University of Toronto Press, Toronto, 2005
- Ernestina Pellegrini, ' Immagini della fine nell'opera di Paola Masino', in " Altri inchiostri. Ritratti e istantanee di scrittrici", Edizioni Ripostes, 2005
- Silvia D'Ortenzi, 'Nascita e morte della massaia. Paola Masino', in "Quaderni del Novecento", V, Istituti Editoriali e Poligrafici Internazionali", Pisa-Roma, 2005
- Lucia Re, 'Women and censorship in fascist Italy: from Mura to Paola Masino', in "Legenda", Modern Humanities Research Association and Maney Publishing, Londra, 2005
- Silvana Cirillo, 'Nascita e morte della Massaia di Paola Masino', in "Nei dintorni del surrealismo", Editori riuniti, Roma, 2006
- Beatrice Manetti, 'Paola Masino. Le molteplici declinazioni del fantastico di una massaia', in "Italia Magica", Letteratura fantastica e surreale dell'Ottocento e Novecento, Atti del Convegno Cagliari-Pula, 2006
- Lucia Stanziano, 'Anna Maria Ortese e Paola Masino: due scrittrici d'avanguardia', in " La Capitanata", Quadrimestrale della Biblioteca Provinciale di Foggia, n.10, 2006
- Louise Rozier, 'From the family to the cloister: images of women in Paola Masino's fiction', in "Rivista di studi italiani", XXV, 2, Stati Uniti, 2007
- Enrico Cesaretti, 'Nutrition as dissolution: Paola Masino's Nascita e morte della Massaia', Quaderni di Italianistica, XXVIII, Toronto, 2007
- Angela Maria D'Amelio, 'Le carte da gioco nell'arte contemporanea: la collezione Paola Masino al Museo di Roma', in " Bollettino dei Musei Comunali di Roma", XXI, Nuova serie, Roma, 2007
- Fulvia Airoldi Namer, 'L'improbable surréalisme de Paola Masino', in "Futurisme et surréalisme", Éditions L'Âge d'Homme, Losanna, 2008
- Louise Rozier, 'The theme of childhood in Paola Masino's Periferia', in "Italica", 84, Summer/Autumn 2007, New York, 2008
- Marina Morbiducci, 'Emma bifronte: luci ed ombre in Monte Ignoso di Paola Masino', in " Il doppio nella lingua e nella letteratura italiana", Collana della rivista "Studia Romanica et Anglica Zagrabiensia", Zagrabia, 2008
- Marinella Mascia Galateria, 'Echi gogoliani in Monte Ignoso di Paola Masino, Atti del Convegno internazionale di Studi Nikolai Vasil'evic Gogol', uno scrittore tra Russia e Italia, Edizioni del Centro Interuniversitario di Ricerche sul Viaggio in Italia, Moncalieri, 2008
- Louise Rozier, 'Paola Masino's short fiction. Another voice in the collective experience of Italian Neorealism', in " Quaderni d'italianistica", Official Journal of the Canadian Society for Italian Studies, XXIX, I, 2008
- Maria Vittoria Vittori, 'Nel mondo misconosciuto di Paola Masino', in "Leggendaria", 71–72, Roma, 2008
- Silvia Boero, 'Metodologie di sovversione: Monte Ignoso di Paola Masino', in "Forum Italicum", volume 42, 1, New York, 2008
- Laura Di Nicola, L'attività giornalistica di Paola Masino negli anni del secondo dopoguerra. L'esperienza di Città, in Atti dell'Accademia Roveretana degli Agiati, volume VIII, 2008
- Enrico Cesaretti, 'Indigestible Fictions; Hunger, Infanticide and Gender in Paola Masino's Fame and Massimo Bontempelli's La Fame', in "Ohio State University Interlibrary Services", volume 23, 2008
- Beatrice Manetti, 'Nascita e morte di una scrittrice. Per un ritratto di Paola Masino' , in "Paragone" LX, terza serie, nr. 84-85-86, agosto-dicembre, Firenze, 2009
- Francesca Bernardini Napoletano, 'Un autoritratto in movimento. Le scritture autonarrative di Paola Masino', in "Avanguardia", 43, anno 15, Roma, 2010
- Marella Feltrin-Morris 'Vision of war. Universality, dignity and the emptiness of symbols in Paola Masino', in "Italica", 87, nr.2, New York, 2010
- Louise Rozier, 'Motherhood and Femininity in Paola Masino's novels Monte Ignoso and Nascita e Morte della Massaia', in "Italica", 88, New York, 2011
- Daniela Gangale, 'Riferimenti musicali nella vita e nell'opera di Paola Masino', in "Bollettino di italianistica", VIII, n.1, Università La Sapienza, Roma, 2011
- Anna Maria Ortese, 'Ricordo la voce dei suoi libri', in "Da Moby Dick all'Orsa Bianca", Adelphi Editore, 2011
- Myriam Trevisan, 'Frammenti di biografie intellettuali nelle lettere a Paola Masino', in "Comunicare Letteratura", Edizioniosiride, Rovereto, n. 4. 2011
- Barbara Garbin, 'Theater and Politics of Womanhood in Paola Masino's 'Nascita e Morte della Massaia'', in "L'anello che non tiene", University of Wisconsin, Madison, Vol. 24, n.1–2, 2012
- Myriam Trevisan, 'Il ricordo di Pirandello tra le carte di Paola Masino', in "Ariel", Bulzoni Editore, Anno II, nr.2, luglio-dicembre 2012
- Marinella Mascia Galateria, 'Paola Masino. Il finale ritrovato di 'Anniversario' ', in "Avanguardia", N. 52, Anno 17, 2013
- Beatrice Manetti, 'L'intreccio delle vite, il palinsesto delle scritture: le carte di Paola Masino nei ' Massimo Bontempelli papers', in Clara Borrelli, Elena Candela, Angelo R. Pupino (a cura di), "Memoria della modernità. Archivi ideali e archivi reali", Atti del XIII Convegno Internazionale della MOD, Napoli, 7–10 giugno 2011, Tomo III, Edizioni ETS, Pisa 2013
- Barbara Garbin, 'From Classic to modern fantastic', in "Forum Italicum", volume 47, 3, New York, novembre 2013
- Beatrice Laghezza, 'Il 'fantastico' di essere donna: spose, massaie e madri nell'opera di Paola Masino', in "Between", IV.7 (2014),, 2014
- Beatrice Laghezza, 'Théories du fantastique: les écrivaines italiennes recréent le genre', in J. Dutel (a cura di), "L'autorité des genres", Atti della Giornata di Studi (Roanne, Institut Universitaire Technique, 22 mai 2014), "Cahiers du CELEC" (Saint-Etienne, CELEC), 9, febbraio 2015, pp. 1–10, https://web.archive.org/web/20150528141100/http://cahiersducelec.univ-st-etienne.fr/
- Beatrice Manetti (a cura), 'Paola Masino', Milano, Fondazione Arnoldo e Alberto Mondadori, giugno 2016
- Lucia Re “Polifonia e dialogismo nei romanzi di epoca fascista: censura, autocensura e resistenza” in Paola Masino, a cura di Beatrice Manetti (Milano: Mondadori, Scrittrici e intellettuali del ‘900, 2016), pp. 163–175. https://www.academia.edu/27915826/Lucia_Re_Paola_Masino._Polifonia_e_dialogismo_nei_romanzi_di_epoca_fascista_Censura_autocensura_e_resistenza._2016
- Beatrice Laghezza, 'Decadenza della morte: Il novecentismo di Paola Masino', in Patrizia Farinelli (a cura di), "Bontempelliano o plurimo? Il realismo magico negli anni di '900' e oltre", Atti della giornata internazionale di studi (Lubiana 14 maggio 2013), Casa Editrice Le Lettere, Firenze, 2016
- Gabriella Palli Baroni, 'I vestiti della memoria: Paola Masino', in "Il Ponte", Anno LXXII n.5, Maggio 2016
- Sandra Petrignani, 'Eccentrica vestale', in "Il foglio quotidiano', Anno XXI Numero 256
- Beatrice Laghezza, 'Una grottesca trilogia di serve-padrone. Potere e creazione nel 'deuxieme sexe' di Paola Masino', in Stefano Lazzarin (a cura di), Il padrone nella letteratura italiana del Novecento, "La critica sociologica", a.L, n.199, pp 61–72, Autunno 2016
- Marella Feltrin-Morris, 'Paola Masino, Album di vestiti', in "Forum Italicum", Stony Brook University, New York, Novembre 2016
- Marinella Mascia Galateria, 'Le carte dipinte-La collezione di Paola Masino al Museo di Roma', Palombi Editori, 2016
- Simona Cigliana, 'Paola Masino, Massimo Bontempelli e il lato eccentrico del novecentismo', in "L'Illuminista", n. 46,47,48, Ponte Sisto Editore, dicembre 2016
- Patrizia Masini, 'Pittori del Novecento e carte da gioco. La collezione di Paola Masino (Palazzo Braschi)', in "Bollettino dei Musei Comunali di Roma", 2016
- Maurizio Serra,'La scrittrice-musa con una grande voglia di riscatto', in "Corriere della sera", 13.01 2017
- Maria Vittoria Vittori, 'Smemorarsi e (ri)conoscersi nel gioco', in "Leggendaria", anno XXI, n. 121, gennaio 2017
- Gabriella Palli Baroni, 'Un libro bellissimo e insopportabile: "Periferia" di Paola Masino', in "Il Ponte", anno LXIII, marzo 2017
- Elio Pecora, 'Paola Masino: un'amicizia a metà', in "Il libro degli amici", Neri Pozza Editore, giugno 2017
- Tristana Rorandelli, 'Paola Masino. Album di vestiti, in "Sharp News, Society for the History of Authorships, Reading and Publishing", (www.sharpweb.org);, 20 novembre 2017
- Marinella Mascia Galateria,'Giochi della memoria nella periferia di Paola Masino, quasi una via Pal', in "Prospettive culturali fra intersezioni, sviluppi e svolte disciplinari in Italia e in Ungheria", Atti del Convegno organizzato dal Dipartimento d'Italianistica della Facoltà di Lettere dell'Università Eotvos Lorànd, Budapest, in collaborazione con l'Istituto Italiano di Cultura di Budapest, 3–4 maggio 2017, a cura di Ilona Fried, Budapest 2018; il medesimo testo in: "Avanguardia", rivista quadrimestrale, n.71, Anno 24, 2019
- Maria Vittoria Vittori, "Il gioco si addice a Paola", in "Avanguardia", rivista quadrimestrale, n.71, Anno 24, 2019
- Marinella Mascia Galateria, "Dalla scrivania tutta per sé al confino della Massaia_La Venezia di Paola Masino", in "Venezia Novecento-Le voci di Paola Masino e Milena Milani", Edizioni Ca' Foscari, 2020
- Arianna Ceschin, "Paola Masino e il complesso rapporto con il capoluogo lagunare", in "Venezia Novecento-Le voci di Paola Masino e Milena Milani", Edizioni Ca' Foscari, 2020
- Cecilia Bello Minciacchi, "Paola Masino inviata alla Manifestazione d'Arte Cinematografica di Venezia del 1946" in "Venezia Novecento-Le voci di Paola Masino e Milena Milani", Edizioni Ca' Foscari, 2020
- Elisa Gambaro, "I conti della Massaia. Il caso editoriale di Paola Masino", in "Protagoniste alle origini della Repubblica", a cura di Laura De Nicola, Carocci editore, 2022
- Alessandro Gerundino, "La ricerca di sé nell'armadio delle memorie: Autobiografia e identità in Album di Vestiti di Paola Masino", in "Espressioni e poetiche dell'identità", Università di Pisa, 2022
- Giulia Caminito, "Paola Masino", in "Amatissime", Giulio Perrone Editore, Roma 2022
- Marinella Mascia Galateria, "Paola Masino contro il ruolo della donna fattrice di figli e massaia imposto dal fascismo", in "Avanguardia", n. 79, Anno 27, 2022
