= Vittorio Orsenigo =

Italian writer and director (1926–2025)

- Born: 5 August 1926; Milan, Italy
- Died: 28 March 2025 (aged 98); Milan, Italy
- Citizenship: Italian
- Occupations: Writer, theater director
- Writing career
- Language: Italian
- Years active: 1950–2015
- Notable awards: Premio Bergamo; 1996
- Movement: Lombard line
- Website: www.vittoriorsenigo.it

Vittorio Orsenigo (5 August 1926 – 28 March 2025) was an Italian short story writer, novelist and theatre director, most of whose fame came in the later years of his life, as he developed his career as a writer when he was almost 80. Orsenigo died in Milan on 28 March 2025, at the age of 98.

== Life and career ==
=== Theatre director ===
Orsenigo started working in the Italian artistic panorama after the Second World War. Following the invitation of Elio Vittorini, he presented a selection of theatrical works by Christopher Isherwood, Bertold Brecht and Wystan Hugh Auden, whose works were not yet popular in Italy in that period. In 1950, Orsenigo started working at Piccolo Teatro di Milano thanks to its director Paolo Grassi. He directed Alfred Jarry's piece Ubu Roy and Guillaume Apollinaire. In that occasion, Orsenigo met Pierluigi Pizzi, who was a beginner at that time. The two started working together and Pizzi drew scenography and costumes for Orsenigo's works. Later in the Eighties, Salvatore Quasimodo stated he was interested in Orsenigo's theatrical works. In the Fifties, Orsenigo also met the writer and critic Raffaele Carrieri. Orsenigo was also a good painter and Carrieri loved his works. Because of this, in 1981 Orsenigo had his first exhibition in Milan for which Achille Bonito Oliva wrote the catalogue. Orsenigo exhibited again in 1984 in Milan and in 1985 at Palazzo dei Diamanti in Ferrara.

=== Writer ===
In the Fifties, Orsenigo had already developed some interest in writing. His first book was a collection of poems named Come gli occhi di sabbia; later in 1954 he published the tale La demenza di giacomo. But only in the Nineties, he restarted his activity with La linea gotica and published some works on the Italian magazines Resine Letterarie and La nuova prosa. In the same years, Orsenigo also performed translations for the Sellerio and Archinto. In 2001, his friend Giuseppe Pontiggia wrote the preface of Settore editoriale; Orsenigo exchanged the courtesy five years later for Pontiggia's Lettere. The Italian critic Massimo Onofri started looking at Orsenigo's work in 2004. One year after, when Commedianti a Milano was published, he stated that "more than a memorial, it is a milanese meditation. [...] if Visite concerns the irremediabile loss of the only loved son, Commedianti would look as a book of euphoric and utopica youthness, filled with uncompleted novels and never published books, uncompleted as it is life itself. But remain the fact that writing for true writers always turns around few obsessions: Quasimodo got a Nobel Prize and disappeared. Vittorini, Banfi, Carrieri – a part from the Nobel – made the same joke. It is not their fault, but the raging of deaths makes the search for the detail more difficult".

In 2008, Orsenigo was already 83 years old and succeeded to extend his fame with two best-sellers: L'uccellino della radio and La camera d'ambra, the latest published with a preface by Sergio Romano. His novels were published for the publishers Archinto and Rizzoli Imprimatur; in 2015 was the time for A Enea Finzi non sparano in fronte, set during the war period. On 28 March 2025, Orsenigo died at the age of 98.

=== Style ===
Orsenigo had a direct realistic style but filled with imaginations and frequent digressions. He wrote about places where he used to live: Milan during the Second World War (Commedianti a Milano, L'uccellino della radio), mountains and woods (Il pizzini di amblar) and exotic lands (Una camera tutta d'ambra, Tanti viaggi). Daniela Marcheschi noted that Orsenigo was "Bizarre and digressive following a humoristic tradition that, through Porta and Rajberti, had prosperous developments in Milan's culture and in the Italian literature of the XIX century afterwords".

== Works ==
=== Poetry ===
- Come gli occhi di sabbia, anni '50

=== Narrative ===
- La demenza di Giacomo, 1954
- La linea gotica, Marietti, 1990
- I libri di Sfax, Greco & Greco, 1991 (con lo pseudonimo di Claude Solenzara)
- Fotografie, rivista Nuova Prosa (romanzo a puntate)
- E... venti racconti appena incominciati, Greco & Greco, 1995
- Mulino da preghiera, Greco & Greco, 1996
- Il verme solitario e altri animali quasi domestici, Greco & Greco, 1997, with Guido Almansi, Roberto Barbolini, Lucio Klobas, Roberto Pazzi, Giovanni Pederiali
- Centotre storie di seduzione (e una postilla), Mobydick, 1998
- In Africa con Alain, Greco & Greco
- Dreyfus, Collana Cristallo di Rocca n. 10, Greco & Greco, 1999, ISBN 9788879802130, with Giangilberto Monti
- Piuma danzante, Greco & Greco, 1999
- Messaggi dal piccolo zoo, Archinto, 1999 ISBN 9788877682680
- Storie zoppe, Lupetti e Manni, 1995 ISBN 9788886302364
- Corpo, Mobydick, 2001
- Settore editoriale, Archinto, 2001
- Visite guidate, Archinto, 2004 ISBN 9788877684011
- Commedianti a Milano, Aliberti, 2005 ISBN 9788874240692
- Telefono, Gaffi, 2006 ISBN 9788887803822
- Lettere a Giuseppe Pontiggia: il cercatore di funghi in Carinzia, Archinto, 2006
- L'uccellino della radio, Gaffi, 2008
- Vittorio Imbriani, Dio ne scampi dagli Orsenigo & Vittorio Orsenigo, Dio ne scampi dagli Imbriani, Aragno editore
- Rina ne uccide quattro, Aliberti, 2009 ISBN 9788874244256
- Collezioni: un amoroso safari, Archinto, 2009 ISBN 9788877685216
- Spiagge, Greco & Greco, 2010 ISBN 9788879805216
- Tanti viaggi, Archinto, 2011 ISBN 9788877685810
- La camera d'ambra, Greco & Greco, 2013 ISBN 9788879806411
- I pizzini di Amblar, Lietocolle, 2013 ISBN 9788878487604
- Cosa trovi nell'acqua, Archinto, 2014, ISBN 9788877686640
- A Enea Finzi non sparano in fronte, Imprimatur RCS libri, 2015, ISBN 9788868303464

=== Translations and curatorships ===
- Guillaume Apollinaire, Il poeta assassinato, Greco&Greco, 1991
- Carlo Collodi, Giannettino
- Carlo Collodi, Pipì lo scimmiottino color di rosa
- Angelo Maria Ricci, Gli sposi fedeli
- Samuel Johnson, La storia di Rasselas Principe di Abissinia, Sellerio, 1993
- A Giacomo Casanova. Lettere d'amore di Manon Balletti - Elisa von der Recke, Milano, Archinto 1997, ISBN 88-7768-211-6
- Guillaume Apollinaire, Lou mia regina, Archinto, 1999
- Georges Picard, Piccolo trattato ad uso di chi vuol avere sempre ragione, Archinto, 2002
