= The Boy with Two Mothers =

1929 novel by Massimo Bontempelli

- Author: Massimo Bontempelli
- Original title: Il figlio di due madri
- Translator: Estelle Gilson
- Language: Italian
- Publisher: "900"
- Publication date: 1929
- Publication place: Italy
- English publication date: 2000
- Pages: 264

The Boy with Two Mothers (Italian: Il figlio di due madri) is a 1929 novel by the Italian writer Massimo Bontempelli. It is about a seven-year-old boy in Rome who suddenly stops recognising his mother, claims his name is Ramiro and not Mario, and demands to be taken to a woman he says is his real mother, whose son Ramiro had died seven years earlier.

The novel is associated with magical realism. It was published in Estelle Gilson's English translation in the 2000 volume Separations: Two Novels of Mothers and Children, which also contains Bontempelli's novel The Life and Death of Adria and Her Children.

It was the basis for the 2000 French film Comedy of Innocence, directed by Raúl Ruiz.
