= Lombard line =

Artistic movement in 20th-century Italy

Lombard line (Italian: Linea lombarda) is the name of an artistic movement that developed in Northern Italy, particularly in the region of Lombardy, at the end of the 19th century and flourished during the first three quarters of the 20th century.

This literary movement was named by Luciano Anceschi in his anthology Linea lombarda (1952), which included published and unpublished works by several authors.

== History ==
The term Linea lombarda comes from a set of themes and authors, in which a typically Lombard “Weltanschauung” is combined. Thus, the authors of late romanticism, Scapigliatura and symbolism, futurism and magic realism are all represented.

During the 1950s a group of writers, poets and critics (who were linked to the definition of the Lombard line) was formed. The group met at the Blue Bar in Milan, in Filippo Meda square. Among them were Luciano Erba, Vittorio Sereni and Piero Chiara.

== Writers and poets ==
=== First generation ===
- Alessandro Manzoni (1785–1873)
- Cletto Arrighi (1828–1906)
- Camillo Boito (1836–1914)
- Iginio Ugo Tarchetti (1839–1869)
- Emilio Praga (1839–1875)
- Achille Bizzoni (1841–1904)
- Arrigo Boito (1842–1918)
- Ludovico Corio (1847–1911)
- Carlo Dossi (1849–1910)

=== Second generation ===
- Paolo Valera (1850–1926)
- Emilio De Marchi (1851–1901)
- Gian Pietro Lucini (1867–1914)
- Carlo Bertolazzi (1870–1916)
- Carlo Linati (1878–1949)
- Delio Tessa (1886–1939)
- Augusto De Angelis (1888–1944)

=== Third generation ===
- Massimo Bontempelli (1878–1960)
- Alberto Savinio (1891–1952)
- Carlo Emilio Gadda (1893–1973)
- Roberto Rebora (1910–1992)
- Aldo Buzzi (1910–2009)
- Giorgio Scerbanenco (1911–1969)
- Vittorio Sereni (1913–1983)
- Piero Chiara (1913–1986)
- Luigi Santucci (1918–1999)
- Alberto Vigevani (1919–1999)

=== Fourth generation ===
- Giorgio Simonotti Manacorda (1915–1971)
- Giorgio Orelli (1921–2013)
- Luciano Erba (1922–2010)
- Giovanni Testori (1923–1993)
- Lento Goffi (1923–2008)
- Ottiero Ottieri (1924–2002)
- Renato Olivieri (1925–2013)
- Luciano Prada (1926–1994)
- Umberto Simonetta (1926–1998)
- Vittorio Orsenigo (1926)
- Giorgio Cesarano (1928–1975)
- Giancarlo Majorino (1928–2021)
- Danilo Montaldi (1929–1975)
- Carlo Castellaneta (1930–2013)
- Franco Loi (1930–2021)
- Giovanni Raboni (1932–2004)
- Sandro Boccardi (1932–2023)
- Raffaele Crovi (1934–2007)
- Angelo Fiocchi (1935–)
- Tiziano Rossi (1935–)
- Grytzko Mascioni (1936–2003)
- Rodolfo Quadrelli (1939–1984)
- Giampiero Neri (1927–2023)
- Maurizio Cucchi (1945–)

== Bibliography ==
- Luciano Anceschi, Linea lombarda: Sei poeti, Magenta, Varese 1952.
- Dante Isella, I lombardi in rivolta: da Carlo Maria Maggi a Carlo Emilio Gadda, Einaudi, Torino 1984.
- Giorgio Luzzi, Poeti della Linea Lombarda 1952–1985, CENS, Liscate Milano 1987.
- Giorgio Luzzi, Poesia italiana 1941–1988: la via lombarda. Diciannove poeti contemporanei (I: Vittorio Sereni, Roberto Rebora, Renzo Modesti, Nelo Risi, Giorgio Orelli, Luciano Erba, Giorgio Simonotti Manacorda, Sandro Boccardi, Grytzko Mascioni; II: Giovanni Raboni, Giorgio Cesarano, Giancarlo Majorino, Lento Goffi, Tiziano Rossi, Angelo Fiocchi, Maurizio Cucchi; III: Guido Oldani, Franco Buffoni, Fabio Pusterla), Marcos y Marcos, Milano 1989. Anche in tiratura riservata a Giampiero Casagrande Editore, Lugano 1989, ISBN 88-7795-031-5.
- Victoria Surliuga, Figure della seconda linea lombarda: l'opera poetica di Franco Loi, Giancarlo Majorino e Giampiero Neri, Diss. Rutgers University, 2003.
