= Horiki Katsutomi =

Japanese painter

Horiki Katsutomi (Chūma, Japan, February 18, 1929 – Cigliano, Italy, February 23, 2021) was a Japanese painter active in Italy from 1969.

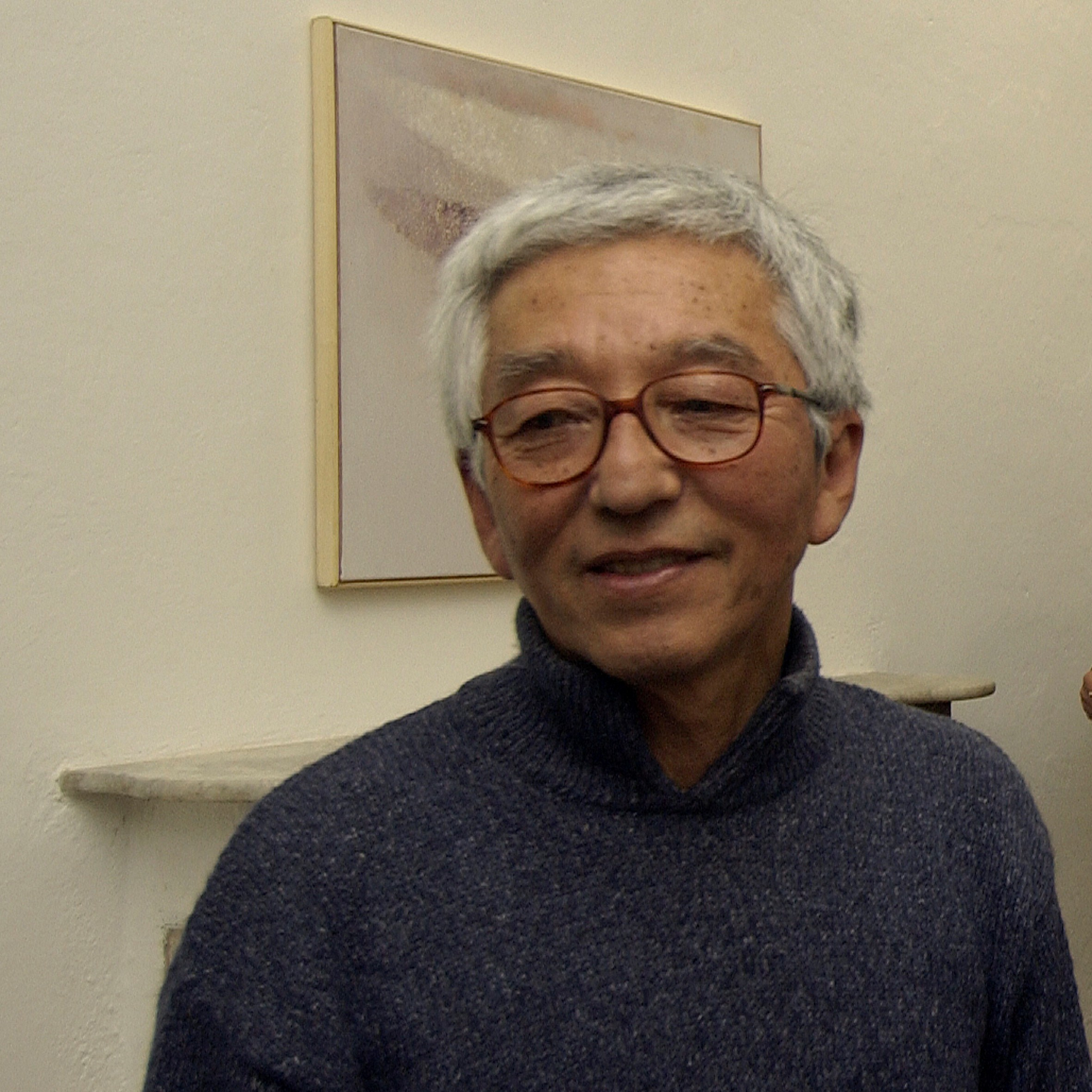
Horiki Katsutomi

== Biography ==
Katsutomi Horiki 堀木 was born in 1929, in Chūma, near Matsusaka, Mie Prefecture, Japan, into a family of imperial officials. He spent his childhood in Chūma. After attending Mie Ujiyamada-Chugaku High School, he moved to Tokyo in 1948, where he studied architecture at the School of the Ministry of Railways. After graduating, he initially worked for the Ministry and later as an architect.

In the second half of the 1960s, he began to devote himself to painting alongside his work as an architect.

=== Move to Italy ===
Fascinated by Italian Renaissance art, especially by the work of Piero della Francesca, and at the same time drawn to the tragic aesthetic of Mario Sironi, Horiki decided to pursue painting and moved to Italy in 1969. He settled in Turin, then a lively cultural center, where from 1971 he attended the Accademia Albertina, studying under painter and engraver Piero Martina.

Horiki held his first solo exhibition in 1972 at the Promotrice delle Belle Arti in Turin. During the 1970s, he participated in numerous solo and group exhibitions in Italy and Europe, including the 10th Quadriennale di Roma, presenting the Impronte series, works characterized by abstract signs and symbols traced in a minimalist manner on large black and white surfaces.

=== The Light of Piero della Francesca ===
During the 1980s, as he deepened his knowledge of Western philosophy and art history and combined it with the Eastern sensibility of his native culture, Horiki pursued an artistic investigation inspired by the Legend of the True Cross, the fresco cycle painted by Piero della Francesca in Arezzo.

Reflecting on the metaphysical essence of the Renaissance master's art, he developed the series Storia della vera Croce. The series Formelle di Arezzo and Tempi di Urbino also belong to this period. In these works, colour became a dominant synthesizing element across geometric spaces.

=== The Odyssey Pictorial Cycle ===
In the mid-1990s, after moving to Cigliano, in the province of Vercelli, Horiki embarked on a pictorial cycle inspired by the Odyssey, which he pursued until the early years of the new millennium. The cycle includes works dedicated to figures and places from the Homeric epic, among them Odysseus, Ithaca, Ogygia, Calypso and Aeolus.

In this phase, his painting was characterized by delicate vibrations of colour within essential spatial fields. According to art historian Elena Pontiggia, in these works the image "is not created by adding, but by subtracting. It emerges from overlapping veils [...], a metaphysical veil, a veil of light settling upon the canvas".

In his later years, Horiki devoted himself mainly to watercolour, continuing to explore themes inspired by the Odyssey.

In 2007, he was awarded the first prize ex aequo at the Premio Sulmona.

== Artistic Research ==
Horiki's artistic research developed through several pictorial cycles that reveal influences of American Abstract Expressionism and European Informalism.

In the Impronte cycle, he employed abstract signs arranged within essential structures across broad monochromatic surfaces, mainly black and white. In the Storia della vera Croce cycle, developed during the 1980s, his painting evolved towards greater chromatic and material complexity.

In the later works inspired by the Odyssey, his research focused on the relationship between light, colour and pictorial space. In this phase, affinities with Color Field painting and the work of Mark Rothko and Barnett Newman have been noted.

Horiki described his work as the search for a universal language through which he could speak to himself and to others, understand his own existence and allow others to understand his way of thinking. He wrote:

"I seek a universal language with which to speak to myself and others, to understand my existence and to allow others to understand how I think and therefore how I am [...]. My life is my work."

In 2024, the Associazione Archivio Horiki Katsutomi was established. Its artistic director is art historian and critic Alberto Barranco di Valdivieso.

== Exhibitions ==
=== Selected solo exhibitions ===
- 1972 – Società Promotrice delle Belle Arti, Turin; Galleria Il Fondaco, Messina
- 1975 – Galleria Studio-Tiziano, Mantua
- 1977 – Galleria Mantra, Turin
- 1978 – Galleria Marin, Turin
- 1987–2003 – Galleria Giancarlo Salzano, Turin
- 1994 – Galleria Arte Centro, Milan; Palazzo Pretorio, Sansepolcro
- 1996 – Galleria Maurizio Corraini, Mantua
- 1999 – Associazione Culturale Il Triangolo Nero, Alessandria
- 2009 – Foundation World Art Delft, Delft
- 2011 – Foyer Sala Soggiorno, Bocconi University, Milan; Palazzo Saluzzo Paesana, Turin
- 2017 – Galleria Raffaella De Chirico, Turin
- 2018 – Saihodo Gallery, Tokyo

=== Selected group exhibitions ===
- 1975 – Travelling exhibition Nutidig Italiensk Kunst, Rudkøbing, Randers and Nakskov (Denmark)
- 1976–1977 – Arte Fiera, Bologna
- 1977 – 10th Quadriennale di Roma
- 1982 – Arteder '82, Bilbao
- 1994–2009 – Premio Sulmona (awarded First Prize ex aequo in 2007)
- 1995 – Travelling exhibition Weltanschauung, Goethe-Institut, Munich
- 1999 – ARCO '99, Madrid
- 2003 – Accademia delle Arti del Disegno, Florence
- 2006 – International travelling exhibition Weltanschauung, Munich
- 2008 – Foundation World Art Delft, WAD IV Symposium, Delft
- 2009 – Museo Würth, Capena
- 2011 – Kavafis Museum, Alexandria (Egypt)
- 2016 – Museum Prinsenhof, Delft
- 2022 – Galleria Del Ponte, Turin

== Essential Bibliography ==
The following publications are among the principal works dedicated to Horiki Katsutomi and his artistic career.

- Giancarlo Salzano, Horiki: dal 7 al 18 giugno 1975, Cosenza, Centro culturale Arte-Segno, 1975.
- Elena Pontiggia, Horiki Katsutomi. Storia della vera croce, Milan, Galleria Arte Centro, 1994.
- Elena Pontiggia, Horiki Katsutomi. Il colore dell'Odissea, Mantua, Maurizio Corraini, 1996.
- Francesco Poli, Horiki Katsutomi: Verso Itaca. Opere 1998–2002, Turin, Galleria Giancarlo Salzano, 2003.
- Aart van Zoest, Horiki Solo Exhibition, Delft, Foundation World Art Delft, 2009.
- Tetsuya Miyata, "Even in Despair – Ikeda Tatsuo, Horiki Katsutomi, Yokoo Tatsuhiko", Bulletin of the Nagaoka Institute of Design, no. 3, 2019, pp. 109–115.
- Horiki Katsutomi. The Invariability of Things, Cinisello Balsamo, Silvana Editoriale, 2022.
- Erminia Ardissino, Horiki. Viaggi e visioni / Travels and Visions, with an introduction by Alberto Barranco di Valdivieso, Alessandria, Linelab, 2025.
- Alessandra Ruffino, Horiki Katsutomi: The Infinite Return, Milan, Dario Cimorelli Editore, 2025.
