= Bontempelli =

Bontempelli is an Italian surname. Notable people with the surname include:

- Lorenzo Bontempelli (born 1965), Italian racing driver
- Marcus Bontempelli (born 1995), Australian rules footballer
- Massimo Bontempelli (1878–1960), Italian poet, playwright, novelist, and composer
