= Comedy of Innocence =

2000 French psychological mystery film

- Film poster
- Directed by: Raúl Ruiz
- Written by: François Dumas; Raúl Ruiz
- Based on: The Boy with Two Mothers by Massimo Bontempelli
- Produced by: Antoine de Clermont-Tonnerre; Martine de Clermont-Tonnerre
- Starring: Isabelle Huppert
- Cinematography: Jacques Bouquin
- Edited by: Mireille Hannon
- Music by: Jorge Arriagada
- Distributed by: Canal+, CNC, TF1
- Release date: 1 September 2000 (Venice Film Festival)
- Running time: 100 minutes
- Country: France
- Language: French
- Budget: $2.1 million
- Box office: $690,000

Comedy Of Innocence (French: Comédie De L'Innocence) is a 2000 French psychological mystery film directed by Chilean filmmaker Raúl Ruiz and starring Isabelle Huppert. It is co-scripted by Ruiz and Françoise Dumas. The film is produced by Mact Productions, distributed by Canal+, CNC, TF1, Les Films du Camelia. The film was loosely adapted from Massimo Bontempelli's novel The Boy with Two Mothers.

The music is composed by Jorge Arriagada, a Chilean composer who collaborated with Ruiz on other films such as Shattered Image and Three Lives and Only One Death, indicating a common practice for Ruiz to collaborate with the same core crew members over multiple films.

== Plot ==
Camille is a child who lives with his parents, Ariane and Pierre, and housekeeper Hélène. Camille often speaks of a friend of his, Alexandre, who he meets with frequently. In addition to this, Camille is very attached to a video-cassette camera which he uses constantly. Camille, eating dinner with the household on his birthday, asks Ariane if she was there for his birth. Ariane replies of course she was and recalls specifics of the scene to Camille after he doubts her answer.

Pierre soon leaves on business and is absent for the rest of the film apart from fleeting phone conversations with Ariane. In Pierre's absence Ariane turns to her brother Serge (a psychiatrist) for help.

After spending an afternoon in the park with Hélène, Camille demands that he be brought to his true home. Confused and upset, Ariane wonders what he means and consults with Hélène, who insists everything was normal until Ariane arrived. Ariane takes Camille home.

Camille persists in demanding that he is taken home, to his true mother, and that this lie has gone far enough. Skeptical, Ariane takes him to the home that Camille brings them to. Ariane knocks on the front door and the caretaker of the apartment, Laurence, opens the door. Ariane tells him that she and the owner are old friends who have lost touch, and that she is dizzy and needs to take a rest inside. Laurence lets them in and Camille runs off into a bedroom with pictures of a young boy across the wall. Laurence reveals - although supposedly Ariane and Camille know this already - that the young boy on the wall drowned years before, and was the owner, Isabelle's, son Paul. Ariane, at that point, insists that Camille and she must go home, however Camille refuses. Ariane asks Laurence to phone for a taxi, and she and Camille go home.

Once at home, Camille refers to Ariane by her name, and not as 'mummy' as before. Ariane and Serge become worried, but decide not to challenge Camille's denial that he is Ariane's son. Ariane takes Camille back to Camille's 'real home' the next day. When they arrive, Isabelle is there and she and Camille seem to bond, with Camille revealing that his true name is Paul. Camille insists that Ariane spend the night with them, as she has been good to him. Ariane, not wishing to abandon her child, agrees.

The next day, Ariane, Isabelle, and Camille go back to Ariane's house. Isabelle is careful not to abandon Ariane too soon, but Isabelle is keen on claiming Camille as her son. Once at home, Camille continues referring to Isabelle as 'mummy' and Ariane by her name. Serge sits in a room alone with Camille and insists that Camille recognises that his true name is Camille, and that Ariane is his true mother. Camille does not agree, and runs away.

Ariane, Isabelle and Serge chase after him. Ariane is now very angry with Isabelle and vows to not let her steal her son away. Feeling lightheaded with the chase and her distress, Ariane confronts Isabelle and asks her to move in with them, as she does not want to lose Camille. Ariane tells Isabelle that she has won.

Isabelle gladly moves her things into Ariane's large home, revealing that she had no family of her own until her son arrived. The next day, Camille is told by his uncle Serge, that his mother, Isabelle, is waiting downstairs and that they have to leave. He complies. Camille is driven off by his uncle before Isabelle appears. When Isabelle arrives, Serge's secretary is waiting with a car to drive her to a hospital, where supposedly Camille is. Once they arrive, Isabelle notices that this is a mental institution. She is confronted by Serge and she demands to leave, while Serge says the only way she can leave is if she is admitted to the hospital. Serge insists that they run tests on her.

Meanwhile, at home, Ariane receives a phone call from Serge that Camille has been dropped off, yet she cannot find him. She eventually does see him in the garden and has a conversation with him and tells him that Isabelle has run off, leaving him alone. Camille refuses to believe her and calls her a liar. Ariane reports to Serge that the conversation did not go well.

Camille runs away again, while Isabelle is nowhere to be found at the hospital, much to Serge's anger. Ariane finds a strange boy in her house. The boy tells her that he is Alexandre, a boy who she had thought was Camille's imaginary friend. He tells Ariane that he knows something is wrong, as Camille has missed their regular meetings for the past two days, and this has never happened before. Alexandre reveals that Camille had been troubled by hallucinations that a ghost named Paul was following him. Alexandre then gives Ariane the possessions that Camille had asked him to pass on to her if Camille was ever in trouble. Alexandre leaves the house via the window that Camille used to leave for their regular meetings.

Isabelle opens the bag of Camille's possessions and finds cassette tapes from Camille's camera, and begins to watch them with Hélène. The video tapes show Isabelle attempting to convince Camille that his real name is Paul and that he is her son. They are standing on the canal/river bank where Isabelle's son fell and drowned, and Isabelle makes sure that Camille understands this. Ariane is now convinced she knows what has happened. She is upset that Hélène must have left him alone, yet Hélène insists she never let Camille out of her sight.

Isabelle goes home with Ariane, who promises not to reveal the cassette tapes. Isabelle insists it is not her fault and that she loves Ariane, who does not believe her. Isabelle insists that Camille is to blame for what has happened. Ariane leaves her in the room, when she hears Camille calling for her.

Ariane tells a skeptical Hélène that they must watch more of the cassette tapes. As Ariane watches, she sees a scene with Camille doubting that Ariane is his mother, and asserting that Isabelle must be his true mother. Isabelle, (with longer hair on the tape suggesting that this was some time ago) at first refuses to agree that she is Camille's mother, but is soon swayed by Camille and is seen skipping off, appearing to be holding an invisible hand.

Ariane then realises that Camille is with Isabelle on a barge on the canal/river close to where Isabelle's son Paul drowned. Serge drives Ariane to the barge to reclaim Camille, and arrives just as Isabelle is about to leave with Camille in a taxi. It becomes clear that Camille now wants to go home with his real mother.

The film ends with a shot of a newly damaged painting hanging on the wall in Ariane's dining wall. The painting - 'The judgement of Solomon'- depicts the desperate conflict between two women who both claim that the same child is their own. Ariane had earlier explained that she had moved the picture to hang on the dining room wall because Isabelle liked it.

Pierre speaks to Ariane on the phone to tell her he is coming home. Ariane assures him that everything has been fine in his absence, but a mutual friend has died, and that Camille has been a little anxious, so it as well that he is coming home because a child needs a father.

== Cast ==
- Isabelle Huppert – Ariane
  - Ariana is the biological mother of Camille and wife to Serge. Ruiz describes her as an inattentive mother who loves her child, yet cannot display her affection. Troubled by her son's insistence that he does not belong to her, she becomes desperate to keep him.
- Jeanne Balibar – Isabella
  - Camille arrives to Isabella's house claiming that his name is Paul and that he is the son of Isabella. She has no remaining family since her son's death a few years prior to the timeline of the film. Her son drowned on a ledge named "Ariane". She lives with her caretaker, Laurence.
- Charles Berling – Serge
  - Serge is husband to Ariane and a doctor who works at a hospital for the mentally ill. He is Camille's father and brother to Pierre.
- Édith Scob – Laurence
  - Laurence is the caretaker of Isabella and keeps the home orderly when Isabella is not home. She is the character who reveals the death of Isabella's son to Ariane and Camille.
- Nils Hugon – Camille
  - Camille turns 9 years old at the start of the film and is Ariane and Serge's son. He uses a cassette video camera to record objects and events and has a friend that his family believes to be imaginary, named Alexandre. He likes to lick his plate after eating. He insists that his name is Paul for most of the film and that he is the son of Isabella.
- Laure de Clermont-Tonnerre – Hélène
  - The caretaker for Ariane and Serge's house, Hélène is in charge of watching Camille while his parents are working or absent. She enjoys being video taped by Camille and often takes him to the park.
- Denis Podalydès – Pierre
  - Pierre is Camille's uncle and frequently appears at Ariane and Serge's house to eat meals and provide assistance.
- Chantal Bronner – Martine
- Bruno Marengo – Alexandre
  - Alexandre was at first believed to be an imaginary friend, but he later arrives in the presence of Ariane and reveals that he has been having meetings with Camille for a while and that they are friends.
- Nicolas de La Baume – Lawyer
- Jean-Louis Crinon – Taxi driver
- Valéry Schatz – Taxi driver
- Emmanuel Clarke – Yannick
- Alice Souverain – Hélène's friend

== Reception ==
Despite a budget of 2.1 million dollars, the film only took $690,000 at the box office. Ruiz indicates that he did not expect certain perception, such as the Argentinian interpretation that the film was a commentary on the missing children during the dictatorship.

There seemed to be critical mixed perception. The New York Times praised the first half to the film as casting "an elegant spell of epistemological confusion". However, when discussing the second half of the film, the reviewer finds the film more irritating than haunting. Eventually, the viewer deems the film as pretentious and teasing, and that pivotal moments happen to matter-of-factly than mysteriously, such as when Ariane insists Isabella moves in with the family and it happens casually.

However, Variety praised the film for its emphasis on ambiguity and mystery of the scenes and objects in the film. Of the ending, Variety says "most viewers will be relieved to find much explained in the end, while others will appreciate pic's lingering last of existential mystery". Either way, the film's conclusion is deemed a success and worth watching.

In an interview with The Independent, Ruiz discusses his motivations for the film and his ongoing relationship with Chile, a country he had long been exiled from. He interviewer called his film "an exquisite and lingering psychodrama starring Isabelle Huppert". He goes on to praise Ruiz himself by saying that "Ruiz is the supreme intellectual of contemporary cinema". As for the film, Ruiz discusses that he has not done much work with the United States, and he sees the advantages, although he would prefer to not have the limitations of working within the United States. He prefers to work on multiple projects at a time, whereas the United States emphasizes single projects at a time.

== Awards and Festivals ==
- Venice Film Festival, 2000
- Toronto International Film Festival, 2000
- BFI London Film Festival, 2000
- New York Film Festival, 2000
- When awarded for Best European Actress by the Stuttgart and Ludwigsburg Film Festival in 2001, Isabelle Huppert was able to choose four films to screen. Among the four were: Loulou (1980) by Maurice Pialat, La Cérémonie (1995) by Claude Chabrol, Modern Life (2002) by Laurence Ferreira Barbosa, and Comedy of Innocence by Raul Ruiz.

== See also ==
- Isabelle Huppert on screen and stage
