= Orpheus (magazine) =

Monthly modernist magazine in Kingdom of Italy (1932–1934)

- Editor-in-chief: Luciano Anceschi; Enzo Paci
- Categories: Modernist literary magazine
- Frequency: Monthly
- First issue: December 1932
- Final issue: January–March 1934
- Country: Kingdom of Italy
- Based in: Milan
- Language: Italian

Orpheus was a modernist monthly journal in Milan, Italy, between 1932 and 1934. Although it was a short-lived periodical, it significantly contributed to the intellectual debate took place in Fascist Italy.

== History and profile ==
Orpheus was started in Milan in 1932, and its first issue appeared in December that year. The magazine was published monthly. Its editors were Luciano Anceschi and Enzo Paci. Brandon Albini was one of the anti-Fascist figures who was instrumental in its run.

Orpheus had a radical and avant-garde approach and covered high cultural matters. Drawings by Pino Ponti were featured in the magazine from 1933. Its target audience was university students and anti-Fascist youth living in Milan.

Orpheus was regularly distributed to book stores, but had less than fifty subscribers. The magazine had a correspondent in Berlin, Grete Aberle, from its second issue. The final issue of the magazine is dated January–March 1934.
