= Tiziano Rossi =

Italian poet

Tiziano Rossi (born in Milan, 1935) is an Italian poet. He is known for his published books of poetry, but in 2020 he also published a collection of short stories.

== Biography ==
A son of the painter Giovanni Rossi, as a poet he is considered an important exponent of the well-known Lombard line (a category which is to be understood in a broad sense, not coinciding perfectly with the geographical area). In his poetry it is often clear a civil wish to defend life from industrial and technological invasions.

Rossi is the editor (with Ermanno Krumm) of the anthological work Poesia italiana del Novecento, with a preface by Mario Luzi (Milan: 1995).

He won the Viareggio Prize for poetry in 2000.

== Selected works ==
- La talpa imperfetta, Milano, Mondadori, 1968
- Dallo sdrucciolare al rialzarsi, Milano, Guanda, 1976
- Miele e no, Milano, Garzanti, 1988
- Il movimento dell'adagio, Milano, Garzanti, 1993
- Pare che il Paradiso, Milano, Garzanti, 1998
- Gente di corsa, Milano, Garzanti, 2000
- Tutte le poesie (1963–2000), Milano, Garzanti, 2003
- Cronaca perduta, Milano, Mondadori, 2006
- Faccende laterali, Milano, Garzanti, 2009
- Spigoli del sonno, Milano, Mursia, 2012
- Piccola orchestra. Antifavole e dicerìe, Milano, La Vita Felice, 2020

== Awards ==
- Premio Nazionale Letterario Pisa
- Premio Nazionale Rhegium Julii
- Viareggio Prize
- Cilento Poetry Prize

== Bibliography ==
- Giorgio Luzzi, Poesia italiana 1941-1988: la via lombarda. Diciannove poeti contemporanei scelti, antologizzati e introdotti da Giorgio Luzzi, Marcos y Marcos, Milano 1989.
- Dizionario della letteratura italiana del Novecento, Torino, Einaudi, 1992, ad vocem.
- Giulio Ferroni, Andrea Cortellessa, Italo Pantani, Silvia Tatti, Ricostruzione e sviluppo nel dopoguerra (1945-1968), vol XI of Storia e testi della letteratura italiana, Milano, Mondadori, 2005, p. 114.
- On Encyclopædia Britannica: Tiziano Rossi | Italian author | Britannica
