= Franco Loi =

Italian poet and writer (1930–2021)

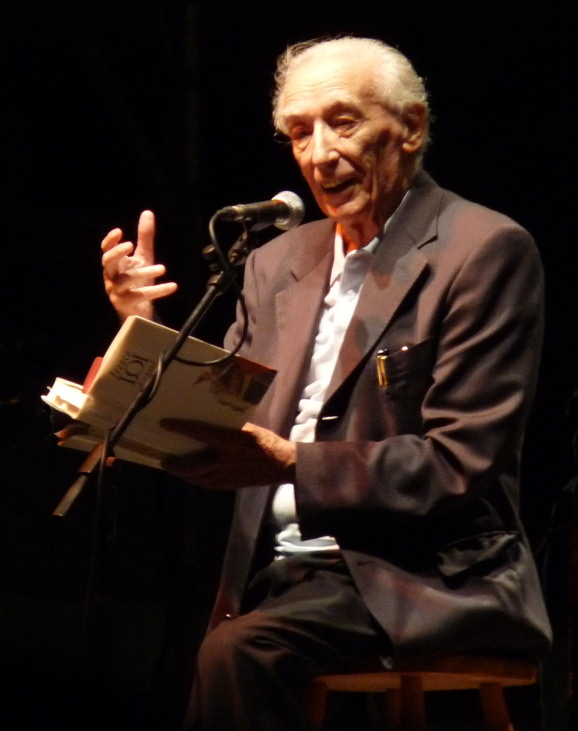
- Loi in 2009
- Born: 21 January 1930; Genoa, Italy
- Died: 4 January 2021 (aged 90); Milan, Italy
- Known for: poetry

Franco Loi (21 January 1930 – 4 January 2021) was an Italian poet, writer and essayist.

== Life ==
Franco Loi was born in Genoa on 21 January 1930.

He made his debut in 1973 as a poet using dialect and had a good success with the work I cart, and the following year, 1974, with Poems of love. In 1975, the poet proved to have reached complete maturity of expression with the poem Stròlegh, published by Einaudi with a preface by Franco Fortini.

In 1978, Einaudi published the collection Teater and in 1981 the work L'Angel followed by Edizioni San Marco dei Giustiniani. Also in 1981, thanks to the collection L'aria, he won the "Lanciano" national prize for dialectal poetry. In 2005, he published L'aria de la memoria for Einaudi, in which he collected all the poems written between 1973 and 2002.

He was part of the fourth generation of Lombard line. He died in Milan, aged 90.

== Works ==
- I cart, Milano, Edizioni Trentadue, 1973.
- Poesie d'amore, incisioni di Ernesto Treccani, San Giovanni Valdarno (Firenze), Edizioni Il Ponte, 1974.
- Stròlegh, introduzione Franco Fortini, Torino, Einaudi, 1975.
- Teater, Torino, Einaudi, 1978.
- L'angel, Genova, Edizioni San Marco dei Giustiniani, 1981.
- Lünn, Firenze, Il Ponte, 1982.
- Bach, Milano, Scheiwiller, 1986.
- Liber, Milano, Garzanti, 1988.
- Memoria, Mondovì (CN), Boetti & C., 1991.
- Poesie, Roma, Fondazione Piazzola, 1992.
- Umber, Lecce, Piero Manni, 1992.
- Poesie, Roma, Fondazione Marino Piazzolla, 1992.
- L'angel, in 4 parti, Milano, Mondadori, 1994.
- Arbur, Bergamo, Moretti & Vitali, 1994.
- Verna, Roma, Empiria, 1997.
- Album di famiglia, Falloppio (CO), Lietocolle, 1998.
- Amur del temp, Milano, Crocetti Editore, 1999.
- Isman, Milano, Einaudi, 2002.
- Aquabella, Novara, Interlinea edizioni, 2004.
- El bunsai, Milano, Il ragazzo innocuo, 2005
- La lûs del ver, Milano, Quaderni di Orfeo, 2006.
- Scultà, Milano, Il ragazzo innocuo, 2006
- I niul, Novara, Interlinea edizioni, 2012.
- Nel scûr, Milano, Quaderni di Orfeo, 2013.
- La torre, Edizioni San Marco dei Giustiniani, Genova, 2020.
- L'angel, Mondadori, Milano, 2022, collana Lo Specchio.
