= Gente nel tempo =

1936 novel by Massimo Bontempelli

- Author: Massimo Bontempelli
- Language: Italian
- Publisher: Nuova Antologia; Edizioni A. Barion
- Publication date: 1936
- Publication place: Italy
- Pages: 333

Gente nel tempo (lit. 'People in Time') is a novel by the Italian writer Massimo Bontempelli. It is set in the early 1900s and follows the dismantling of an Italian family after its authoritarian matriarch dies and prophesises that all her descendants will die young. The novel was serialised in Nuova Antologia in 1936 and published as a book the following year. It is associated with magic realism.
