= Italien (magazine) =

Cultural magazine in Heidelberg, German Empire (1927–1944)

- Editor: Werner von der Schulenburg; Albert Prinzing
- Categories: Cultural magazine
- Frequency: Monthly
- Publisher: Kampmann Verlag
- Founder: Werner von der Schulenburg
- Founded: 1927
- First issue: December 1927
- Final issue: June 1944
- Country: Germany
- Based in: Heidelberg
- Language: German

Italien was a monthly far-right cultural magazine published in Heidelberg between 1927 and 1944 with two-year interruption to reinforce the relations between Germany and the fascist rule in Italy. Its subtitle was Monatsschrift für Kultur, Kunst und Literatur (German: Monthly for culture, art and literature).

== History and profile ==
Italien was established in 1927 by Werner von der Schulenburg who was a sympathizer of Fascism and Benito Mussolini. Its first issue appeared in December 1927. Egon Vietta (pseudonym of Egon Fritz) developed the design and content of the magazine. Italien was inspired from the publication of the German-French Association entitled Deutsch-französische Rundschau. The publisher of Italien was Kampmann Verlag based in Heidelberg. It was supported by the Mussolini government. In 1940 the magazine ceased publication, but was restarted as the official organ of the association Deutsch-Italienische Gesellschaft (German: German-Italian Society). In this period the magazine was supported by the Nazi government. Werner von der Schulenburg edited Italien until 1943 when Albert Prinzing replaced him in the post.

German diplomat Ulrich von Hassell was on the editorial board of Italien. Some of its contributors included Margherita Sarfatti and Massimo Bontempelli. The magazine featured articles on the Italian literature and other cultural materials focusing on Italy. It folded in June 1944.
