= Luciano Erba =

Italian poet, literary critic and translator (1922–2010)

- Born: 18 September 1922; Milan, Kingdom of Italy
- Died: 3 August 2010 (aged 87); Milan, Italy
- Occupation: Poet

Luciano Erba (18 September 1922 – 3 August 2010) was an Italian poet, literary critic and translator.

== Life and career ==
Born in Milan, in 1947 Erba graduated in French literature at the Università Cattolica del Sacro Cuore. A member of the so-called "Lombard line" movement, he debuted as a poet in 1951 with the collection Linea K.; his style was characterized from a realistic and everyday approach which was at the same time also metaphoric and hermetic.

During his career Erba was the recipient of numerous awards, including the Viareggio Prize for Poetry in 1980 for Il prato piu verde and Il nastro di Moebius, the Bagutta Prize in 1988 for II tranviere metafisico, the PEN Award in 1995 for L'ipotesi circense.

Erba was a lecturer in several universities, including his alma mater. He collaborated as a literary critic for various publications, including Itinerari, La Fiera Letteraria, Il Verri and The Western Review, and was active as a translator from French and English languages.
