= Il Verri =

Literary magazine in Italy

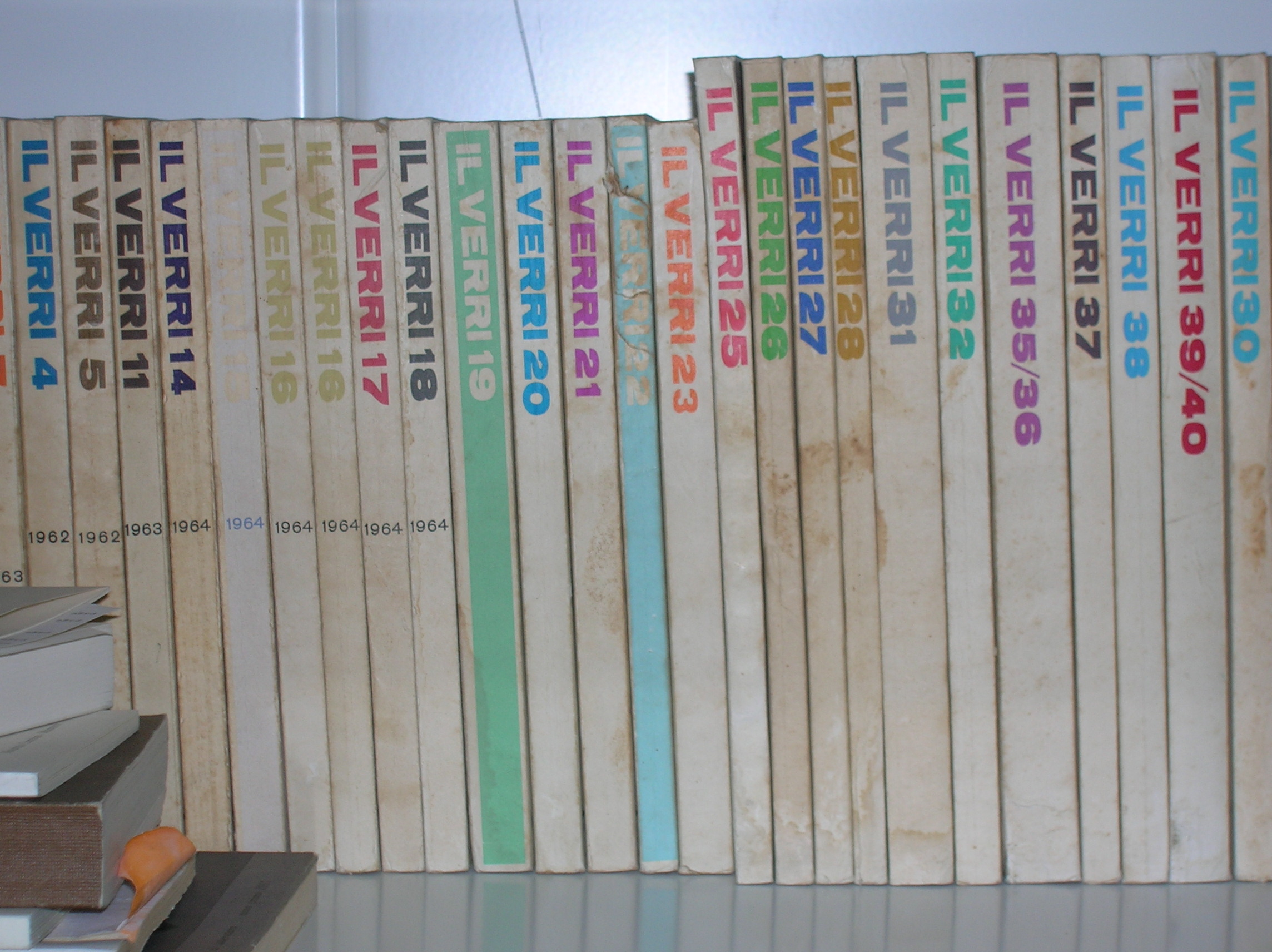
- Collection of Il Verri issues
- Categories: Literary magazine
- Frequency: Quarterly
- Founder: Luciano Anceschi
- Founded: 1956
- Country: Italy
- Based in: Milan
- Language: Italian
- Website: Il Verri
- ISSN: 0506-7715
- OCLC: 1624196

Il Verri is a quarterly literary magazine, which has been published since 1956. The magazine is based in Milan, Italy.

== History and profile ==
Il Verri was started by Luciano Anceschi in Milan in 1956. The magazines is published quarterly in Milan. However, in 1973 it temporarily moved to Bologna.

In the early 1960s Il Verri began to cover the writings of neo avant garde authors, including Umberto Eco, Edoardo Sanguineti, Antonio Porta and Nanni Balestrini. They were part of a literary circle called Gruppo 63. The magazine played a significant role for Umberto Eco in shaping his theories. Luciano Erba and Alfredo Giuliani were also among the contributors.

From its start in 1956 Il Verri has been instrumental in making some approaches familiar in Italy such as phenomenology, structuralism and semiology. The magazine also publishes poems, some of which were anthologized by Luciano Anceschi in a book in 1961.

== See also ==
- List of avant-garde magazines
- List of magazines in Italy
