= Aldo Buzzi =

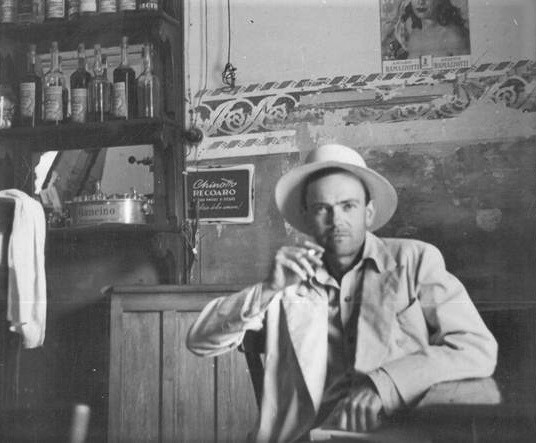
- Aldo Buzzi
- Born: 10 August 1910; Como, Italy
- Died: 9 October 2009 (aged 99); Milan, Italy
- Occupation(s): Author and architect

Aldo Buzzi (10 August 1910 – 9 October 2009) was an author and architect.

Born in Como, Italy, Buzzi graduated from the Milan School of Architecture in 1938. Though primarily an author of travel and gastronomy books, he also worked as an architect; as assistant director, scene writer, and screenwriter for various film production companies in the former Yugoslavia, and in Rome, Italy, and France. He edited the following films: La Kermesse héroïque, Ridolini e la collana della suocera e Ridolini esploratore, and Sette anni di guai, all produced by Editoriale Domus, 1945.

He was part of the third generation of Lombard line.

== Publications ==
- Taccuino dell'aiuto-regista (1944)
- Quando la pantera rugge (1972)
- Piccolo diario americano, illustrated by Saul Steinberg (1974)
- L'uovo alla kok: ricette, curiosita (1979)
- Viaggio in Terra delle mosche e altri viaggi (1994); translated into English by Ann Goldstein and published as Journey to the Land of the Flies (1996)
- Cechov a Sondrio (1991)
- A Weakness for Almost Everything (1999); translated by Ann Goldstein
- The Perfect Egg and Other Secrets (2005); translated by Guido Waldman, illustrated by Saul Steinberg
- Parliamo d'altro (2006)
