= Lento Goffi =

Italian poet (1923–2008)

- Born: 15 November 1923; Chiari, Italy
- Died: 14 January 2008 (aged 84); Brescia, Italy
- Occupations: Poet; writer; literary critic
- Spouse: Elisa Marchina
- Children: Giorgio
- Writing career
- Genre: Poetry
- Literary movement: Linea lombarda

Lento Goffi (15 November 1923 – 14 January 2008) was an Italian poet, literary critic and journalist who carried out his work mainly in Lombardy, in the Brescia area.

== Biography ==
Born in 1923 into an anti-fascist family, he attended the Liceo Arnaldo in Brescia and graduated in Modern Literature at the University of Milan, later teaching in some institutes in Brescia. He has published, among others, in the magazine Il Bruttanome. Goffi was married to Elisa Marchina; they had a son, Giorgio.

Goffi died in 2008 in an elderly care facility in Brescia.

== Poetics ==
Goffi was one of the most important and active fourth generation exponents of Lombard line, developed in Lombardy area from the end of the 19th century and flourished during the first three quarters of the 20th century.

== Major works ==
=== Poetry ===
- 1962: Lunarietto (Il Bruttanome)
- 1964: Cinque poesie e una prosa (Sigma (review))
- 1968: Dalla Marca d'Oriente (Scheiwiller)
- 1971: Un'isola, sì con sei incisioni di Franca Ghitti (L.N.C.)
- 1974: Evasivamente flou (Scheiwiller Books)
- 1979: Cronachetta con sei incisioni di Franca Ghitti (Scheiwiller)
- 1981: Un sabato di febbraio (Società di poesia)
- 1984: L'attimo incolore con tre acqueforti di Giovanni Repossi (Il Farfengo)
- 1986: Diario per l'assente (Lo Specchio (collection), Mondadori)
- 1991: L'amata Phegea (La Quadra)
- 1994: Per orbite interne (La Quadra)
