= The Faithful Lover =

1953 short story collection by Massimo Bontempelli

- Author: Massimo Bontempelli
- Original title: L'amante fedele
- Translator: Estelle Gilson
- Language: Italian
- Publisher: Mondadori
- Publication date: 1953
- Publication place: Italy
- English publication date: 2007
- Pages: 291

The Faithful Lover (Italian: L'amante fedele) is a 1953 short story collection by the Italian writer Massimo Bontempelli. It contains 14 short stories and a novella. The stories were written from 1940 to 1946 and are associated with magical realism. A recurring subject is the process toward self-awareness and validation of life choices.

Host Publications published an English translation by Estelle Gilson in 2007. The English edition omits two stories. The book was awarded the 1953 Strega Prize.

== Contents ==
Stories as they are ordered in the Italian original

1. "Nitta"
2. "Second-Story Man" (Il ladro Luca)
3. "Violets" (La violetta)
4. "Pilgrims" (I pellegrini)
5. "Pietro and Domenico" (Pietro e Domenico)
6. "Encounter" (Convegno)
7. "Lights" (Luci)
8. "La bella addormentata" (lit. 'The Sleeping Beauty')
9. "Empress" (Imperatrice)
10. "Octogenarian" (Ottuagenaria)
11. "The Faithful Lover" (L'amante fedele)
12. "Il segreto" (lit. 'The Secret')
13. "Moonwort" (Lunarie)
14. "The Rooster" (Gallo)
- Water (L'acqua)
