= Giampiero Neri =

Italian poet (1927–2023)

- Born: 1927; Erba, Lombardy, Italy
- Died: 2023 (aged 95–96); Milan
- Known for: Poetry
- Awards: Cilento International Poetry Prize

Giampietro Pontiggia (7 April 1927 – 15 February 2023), also known by the pen name Giampiero Neri, was an Italian poet. He was noted for his novel style; his work is known for its concise, dry, and unembellished style, and veined with melancholy and humor. His work was often written in prose. He was part of the fourth generation of Lombard line.

== Biography ==
Neri was born in Erba, Como on 7 April 1927. He grew up during World War II, in which he lost members of his family. His younger sister committed suicide in her twenties. He began publishing poetry in the 1960s, influenced by his younger brother (but more known at that time) - Giuseppe Pontiggia. He was soon recognized as a major exponent of the Milanese school of poetry. His poems were often themed around the experiences during the war. He was one of the first in Italy to use a poetical prose as poetry (likely influenced by the descriptive narratives by Vittorio Sereni) and has been called "a master of poetry in Italian prose". In 1948 he moved with his family to Milan, where he continued to work in a bank for forty years before his retirement.

Neri died on 15 February 2023, at the age of 95.

== Selected works ==
- L'aspetto occidentale del vestito (Guanda: 1976) ASIN B00I52X4E4
- Liceo (Guanda: 1986) ISBN 88-7746-239-6
- Dallo stesso luogo (Coliseum: 1992) ISBN 978-88-7764-025-3
- Teatro naturale (Mondadori: 1998) ISBN 978-88-04-43622-5
- Erbario con figure (LietoColle: 2000) ISBN 88-7848-067-3
- Finale (Dialogolibri: 2002)
- Armi e mestieri (Mondadori: 2004) ISBN 978-88-04-52938-5
- Piano d'erba (Quaderni di Orfeo: 2005)
- Di questi boschi (Quaderni di Orfeo: 2007)
- Paesaggi inospiti (Mondadori: 2009) ISBN 978-88-04-58815-3
- Il professor Fumagalli e altre figure (Mondadori: 2012) ISBN 978-88-04-62166-9
- Via provinciale (Garzanti: 2017) ISBN 978-88-11-67244-9
- Non ci saremmo più rivisti. Antologia personale (Interlinea edizioni: 2018) ISBN 978-88-6857-179-5
- Piazza Libia (Ares edizioni: 2021) ISBN 978-88-9298-078-5

== Anthologies ==
- Poesie. 1960-2005 (Mondadori: 2007) ISBN 978-88-04-56626-7
- Antologia personale (Garzanti edizioni: 2022) ISBN 978-88-11-00079-2

== Bibliography ==
- Daniela Marcheschi, La natura e la storia. Quattro scritti per Giampiero Neri (Le Lettere: 2002) ISBN 978-88-7166-679-2
- Vincenzo Pezzella (edited by), Giampiero Neri. Poesie e immagini (Viennepierre: 2005)
- Pietro Berra, Giampiero Neri. Il poeta architettonico (Dialogolibri: 2005)
- Victoria Surliuga, Uno sguardo sulla realtà. La poesia di Giampiero Neri (Joker: 2005) ISBN 88-7536-031-6
- Elisabetta Motta "Degli animali. Viaggio nel bestiario di Giampiero Neri (Cartacanta: 2018) ISBN 88-85568-34-3
- Enzo Rega, in Dizionario critico della poesia italiana 1945-2020 (Società Editrice Fiorentina: 2021)
