= Augusto De Angelis =

Italian writer and journalist (1888–1944)

Augusto De Angelis (28 June 1888 – 18 July 1944) was an Italian writer and journalist, active in particular during the Fascist rule in Italy. He was part of the second generation of Lombard line.

He is a subject of the novel Broken Truths by Alessandro Robecchi, in which a modern filmmaker investigates the circumstances of his death. The novel includes quotations from his works and period articles about his life.

== Biography ==
De Angelis was born in 1888 in Rome. He published his first mystery, Il banchiere assassinato, in 1935. He subsequently wrote some twenty crime books, whose protagonist is Commissario Carlo De Vincenzi of the squadra mobile of Milan. Some of them were adapted for television by RAI in 1974–1977, with Paolo Stoppa playing the role of De Vincenzi.

Despite the success of the books, the Fascist government banned them. De Angelis was arrested in 1943, accused of being Anti-Fascist. After a few months he was freed but soon afterwards he was beaten by a Fascist activist at Bellagio, and died at Como Hospital of the wounds he had received.
