= Luciano Anceschi =

Italian literary critic and essayist

Luciano Anceschi (Italian pronunciation: [luˈtʃaːno anˈtʃeski]; February 20, 1911 in Milan – May 2, 1995 in Bologna) was an Italian literary critic and essayist. A pupil of Antonio Banfi, with whom he graduated in philosophy in 1933, he taught aesthetics at the Faculty of Humanities and Philosophy at the University of Bologna from 1952 to 1981. His interest in literature and the arts was always accompanied by that for the modern anti-dogmatic philosophy: after the publication of his graduation thesis "Autonomy and Heteronomy of art" published by Sansoni in 1936, his research on anti-idealistic literary figures and models found voice in comments published in Orpheus from 1932 and in Corrente di vita giovanile in 1938-1939, self promoted magazines.

Sensitive to new cultural trends, he was in favor of Hermeticism and Neo avant garde, working at the same time as theorist and militant reviewer: he published the Saggi di poetica e poesia. Con una scheda sulla Swedenborg (1942) and edited the anthologies of Lirici nuovi (1943) and Lirica del Novecento (Lyrics for the 20th Century) (1953). He was the author of the article "Ermetismo" (Hermeticism) in the Enciclopedia del Novecento (Encyclopedia of the 20th Century) (1977). Focusing on cultural models forgotten by Neo-idealism, he devoted himself to the themes of the Baroque period, publishing in 1953 Del Barocco e altre prove and in 1960 Barocco e Novecento. Con alcune prospettive metodologiche (The Baroque and the 20th Century: With Methodological Perspectives).

He never gave up his study of philosophy: in 1955 he wrote I presupposti storici e teorici dell’estetica kantiana (The Historical and Theoretical Presuppositions of the Kantian Esthetic), from 1965 D. Hume e i presupposti empirici dell’estetica kantiana (D. Hume and the Empirical Presuppositions of the Kantian Esthetic), from 1967 Burke e l’estetica dell’empirismo inglese (Burke and the Esthetics of English Empiricism) and from 1972 Da Bacone a Kant. Saggi di estetica (From Bacon to Kant: Essays in Esthetics). In particular in Progetto di una sistematica dell’arte (Project for a Systematics of Art)(1962) he outlined a theory of aesthetic understanding of art forms such as phenomenology. He based all later research on the principles of critical phenomenology. In 1956 he founded the magazine Il Verri, of which he was the editor, while also directing from 1973 for Paravia the series La tradizione del nuovo; within the university he directed the journal Studi di estetica (Studies in Esthetics), which synthesized the results of philosophical inquiry which he conducted along with his students.

In the publications from the 1960s, the central themes were poetics: Poetiche del Novecento in Italia (Italian Poetics of the 20th Century), 1961, Le poetiche del Barocco, (Poetics of the Baroque), 1963 and of literary institutions: Le istituzioni della poesia (The Institutions of Poetry), 1968, Da Ungaretti a D’Annunzio (From Ungaretti to D'Annunzio), 1976, Che cosa è la poesia? (What Is Poetry?), 1986.

Among the more recent writings are Il Chaos, il metodo. Primi lineamenti di una nuova estetica fenomenologica, (Chaos and Method: The Early Lineaments of a New Phenomenological Esthetic), 1981 and Gli specchi della poesia. Riflessione, poesia, critica (Mirrors of Poetry: Reflections, Poetry, Criticism), 1989.

President of the Bologna Board of artistic manifestations, of the Accademia delle Scienze and of the Accademia Clementina di Bologna, associated and correspondent of the Accademia Nazionale dei Lincei of Roma, he donated his library (almost 30,000 works) and his personal archive (another 18,000 letters and thousands of autographs) to the Municipality of Bologna; at present they are preserved at the Biblioteca Comunale dell’Archiginnasio.

== Bibliography ==
- Anceschi, Luciano. "T. S. Eliot and Philosophical Poetry" in T. S. Eliot: A Symposium, edited by Richard March and Tambimuttu, 154-166. London: Editions Poetry, 1948.
