= Elena Pontiggia =

Italian art critic

- Born: July 22, 1955 (age 71); Milan, Italy
- Education: University of Milan
- Occupations: Art critic, professor
- Employer(s): Accademia di Belle Arti di Brera, Politecnico di Milano
- Awards: Golden Valentine's Day (for Art History)

Elena Pontiggia (22 July 1955) is an Italian art critic, art historian and curator based in Milan.

== Biography ==
Born in Milan, the only daughter of poet Giampiero Neri, Elena Pontiggia graduated in philosophy at the University of Milan with a thesis on Nietzsche's aesthetics. From 1987 to 1993 she served on the scientific committee of the Padiglione d'Arte Contemporanea (PAC) in Milan. Since 2001 she has been a member of the scientific committee of Fondazione Stelline and in January 2022 she was appointed president of the Kuratorium, the scientific committee of the Volker e Aurora Feierabend Stiftung in Frankfurt.

Pontiggia is a Professor of art history at the Brera Academy and the Polytechnic University of Milan. She has written for various newspapers and magazines and since 2011 she is a regular contributor to La Stampa. Among the prizes she won it is included the "Golden Valentine's Day" for the History of Art in 1996, the "Carducci prize" for Modernity and Classicism in 2009 and the Prize "Casinò di Sanremo-Antonio Semeria".

== Selected Publications ==
- Edward Hopper: Scritti, interviste, testimonianze, Abscondita, Milan, 2000. 978-8884160010
- La grande Quadriennale. 1935: la svolta dell'arte italiana (with Carlo Fabrizio Carli), Electa, Milan, 2006. 978-8837046491
- Mimmo Rotella: Multiple Decollages, Silvana Editoriale, Milan, 2006. 978-8882158651
- A Loving Hunt: Italian Interbellum Art in the Iannaccone Collection (with Claudia Gian Ferrari), Skira, Milan, 2010. 978-8857203829
- Italo Valenti, Pagine d'Arte, Milan, 2012. 978-8896529065
- Mario Sironi: La grandezza dell'arte, le tragedie della storia, Johan & Levi, Milan, 2015. 978-8860102232
- Christian Schad, Abscondita, Milan, 2015. 978-8884165114
- Arturo Martini: La vita in figure, Johan & Levi, Milan, 2015. 978-8860102331
- Edward Hopper, Skira, Milan, 2018. 978-8857232232
- Maria Lai: Art and Connection, Ilisso, Nuoro, Italy, 2018. 978-8862023573
- Aubrey Beardsley, Abscondita, Milan, 2018. 978-8884167446
- Giorgio De Chirico: Gli anni Quaranta, La Nave di Teseo, Milan, 2021. 978-8834609033
- Storia del Novecento Italiano: 1920-1932, Umberto Allemandi, Turin, 2022. 978-8842225331
- Maria Lai: Holding the Shadow by the Hand, Five Continents Editions, Paris, 2024. 979-1254600849
