= Massimo Bontempelli =

Italian writer (1878–1960)

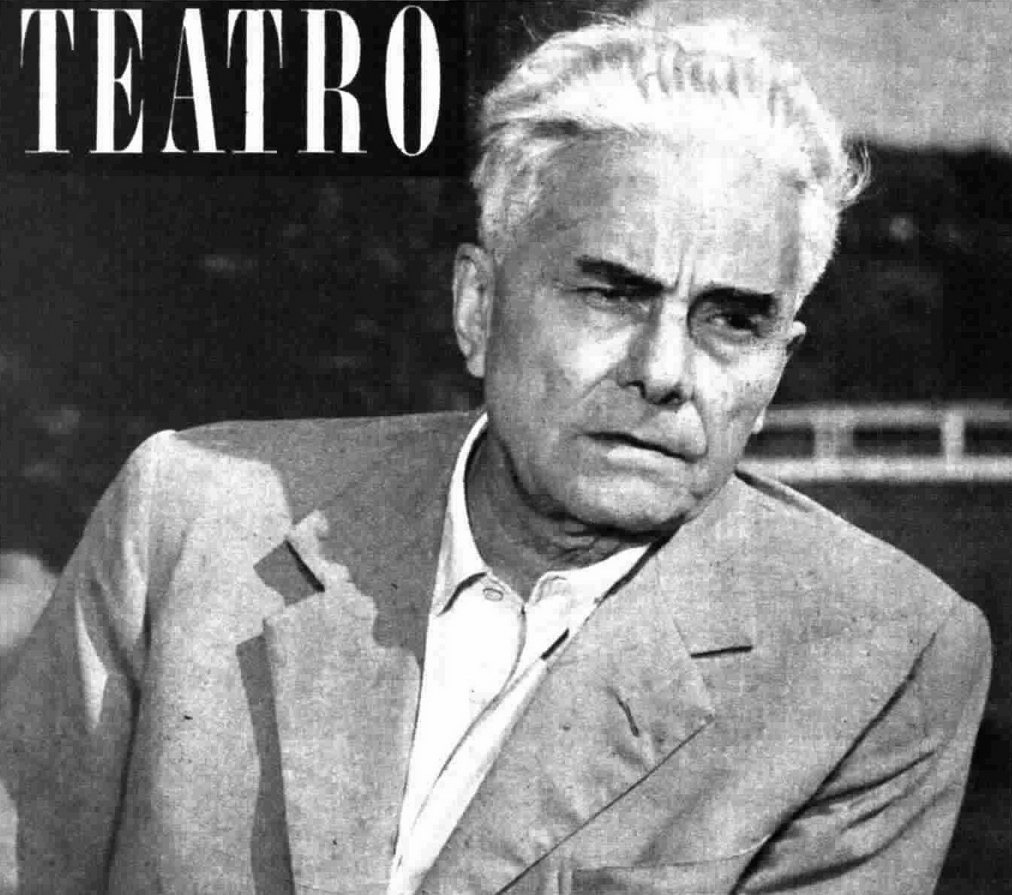
- Bontempelli in 1954
- Born: 12 May 1878; Como
- Died: 21 July 1960 (aged 82); Rome
- Occupations: novelist, short story writer, journalist, playwright, composer
- Writing career
- Genres: Novel, short story
- Notable work: The Chess Set in the Mirror
- Literary movement: Magical realism

Massimo Bontempelli (12 May 1878 – 21 July 1960) was an Italian poet, playwright, novelist and composer. He was influential in developing and promoting the literary styles known as magical realism and lombard line.

== Life ==
Massimo Bontempelli was born in Como to Alfonso Bontempelli and Maria Cislaghi. His father was a train engineer on the State Railways and frequently moved with his family to other cities for work reasons. Massimo attended the R. Liceo Ginnasio Giuseppe Parini in Milan, where his literature teacher was Alfredo Panzini, and in 1897 graduated in Alessandria.

Bontempelli graduated from the University of Turin, where he was a pupil of Arturo Graf and Giuseppe Fraccaroli. He taught literature in Cherasco and then in Ancona for seven years, doing his writing on the side. Starting from 1904 he published a series of collections of poems and short stories, as well as a tragedy in verse, Costanza, and a comedy, Santa Teresa, all works of a classicist character. He then abandoned teaching when he could not secure a position at a secondary school.

After leaving teaching in 1910 and settling in Florence, Bontempelli worked as a journalist for Il Marzocco, La Nazione, the Nuova Antologia, the weekly Le Cronache literarie, Il Nuovo Giornale, Il Fieramosca and Corriere della Sera, as well as for the Sansoni publishing house. An adherent of Giosuè Carducci in the debates with followers of Benedetto Croce, he published essays in the field of literary criticism as well as a volume of stories Sette Savi.

In 1915, he began as cultural manager of the Italian Publishing Institute and moved to Milan, overseeing the publication of classics of Italian literature. At the same time he was a collaborator of the Milanese newspaper Secolo and a war correspondent for the Roman newspaper Il Messaggero. A convinced interventionist, in 1917 he enlisted as an artillery officer, while also collaborating on the military newspaper Il Montello and obtaining two medals for valour and three war crosses.

Discharged in 1919, he published a volume of poems written between 1916 and 1918, Il Purosangue. He then published the novels La vita intense (1920), which he had already published in installments in Ardita, the monthly supplement of Il Popolo d'Italia, and La vita operosa in 1921.

It was his time as a journalist in Paris in the years 1921 and 1922 that put him in contact with the new French avant-gardes and profoundly changed his image of the modern artist. In the short novels The chessboard in front of the mirror (1922) and Eva ultima (1923) he employed a style inspired by the irrational arbitrariness and the apparent randomness of dreams, a writing approach that largely coincides with the pronouncements of the Surrealist Manifesto by André Breton (1924). Alongside his friends Alberto Savinio and Giorgio de Chirico, he pioneered surrealistic experiments in Italian art, which he defined as magical realism.

Settling in Rome, he became part of the Teatro degli Undici, founded by Luigi Pirandello's son Stefano and Orio Vergani, and made friends with Luigi Pirandello, who pushed him to write plays for his company. The results were Nostra Dea (1925) and Minnie la candida (1927), perhaps Bontempelli's theatrical masterpiece, a fairy-tale drama, albeit plausible, that takes place in an atmosphere that always oscillates between nightmare and play.

On 8 August 1926, in the villa of Pirandello, near Sant'Agnese, he was challenged to a duel by Giuseppe Ungaretti, due to a controversy that arose in the Roman newspaper Il Tevere. Ungaretti was slightly wounded in the right arm and the duel ended in a reconciliation.

In 1926, he, along with Curzio Malaparte, founded the journal "900". James Joyce, Max Jacob, and Rainer Maria Rilke sat on the editorial committee and Virginia Woolf and Blaise Cendrars were among the contributors. The magazine ceased publication in 1929.

In March 1927, Bontempelli, who had separated from his wife, began a relationship with Paola Masino, who was thirty years younger. Masino worked with Bontempelli on "900" and together they wrote the unreleased drama, "The Sinking of the Titanic", then moved with him to Paris, where they encountered artists and intellectuals such as Ilya Ehrenburg, Paul Valéry, Max Jacob, André Maurois, André Gide, Emil Ludwig, Giorgio de Chirico, Alberto Savinio, and Pirandello.

During the 1920s and early 1930s, Bontempelli had ties to fascism. In 1924 he joined the P.N.F., together with Luigi Pirandello. He served as a secretary of the fascist writers' union from 1928 and spent time abroad lecturing on Italian culture. A convinced supporter of fascism, which he saw as the most suitable political means to support the birth of a modern society in Italy, Bontempelli was made a member of the Royal Academy of Italy on 23 October 1930. Back in Milan in 1931, he published My life, death and miracles. The following year he moved to Frascati and in 1933 he and Pier Maria Bardi founded the art magazine Quadrante.

He began to distance himself from fascism in the 1930s. On 23 August 1936, he published the critical article The usual cues in the Gazzetta del Popolo of Turin; on 29 June he published the article The frogs ask many kings, which attacked the proposal to establish a national register of art critics. On 27 November 1938, at the commemoration speech for Gabriele d'Annunzio, he criticized the "military obedience" which had become a national custom.

In 1938, he refused to accept a university post formerly held by Attilio Momigliano, a Jewish professor removed from the chair of Italian literature at the University of Florence, and was kicked out of the Fascist party, drifting towards Communism. Prohibited by the authorities from writing for a year, he and Masino left Rome and resided in Venice, in a sort of "golden exile", at the villa of Baron Franchini. Through all this Bontempelli remained a member of the Royal Academy until 25 July 1943. During World War II Bontempelli was a contributor to the magazine Italien based in Heidelberg, Germany.

After the fall of Mussolini he returned to Rome, but the death sentence issued by the Republic of Salò, the new regime led by Alessandro Pavolini, forced him and Masino to hide in a friend's house. Upon the liberation of Rome, he founded the weekly Città with Masino, Alberto Moravia, Savinio and Guido Piovene. In 1945 he returned to Milan where he created, together with Ugo Betti, Sem Benelli, Diego Fabbri and other playwrights, the National Drama Writers Union, with the aim of safeguarding the work of playwrights and other theatrical authors.

In 1948, Bontempelli won a Senate race on the Popular Democratic Front ticket but the results were voided in 1950 when his role editing an anthology of Italian literature for school children, which triggered the provisions barring anyone who had authored school texts from holding public office for five years after adoption of the new Constitution was discovered. In 1953, Bontempelli's short story collection The Faithful Lover received the Strega Prize, Italy's most prestigious literary award.

== Personal life ==
In 1909 he married Amelia Della Pergola (1886-1977), with whom he had a daughter, who died a few months later, and their son Massimo (1911-1962). After years of declining health that prevented him from continuing his work, Bontempelli died in Rome at the age of 82 on 21 July 1960. He is buried in the Verano cemetery in Rome.

He was in a long-term relationship with Paola Masino that lasted from the late 1920s until his death. After his passing, she edited a two-volume edition of his works. Her book Me, Massimo and the others-autobiography of a daughter of the century was published posthumously in 1995.

== Works ==
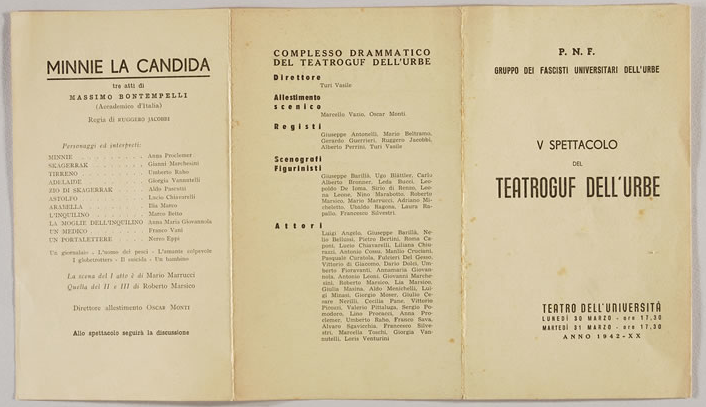
Title page of Minnie la candida by Massimo Bontempelli (1928)

- 1908 Socrate moderno
- 1912 I sette savi
- 1916 La guardia alla luna (Watching the Moon)
- 1919 Il purosangue; Siepe a nordovest
- 1920 La vita intensa - Romanzo dei romanzi
- 1921 La vita operosa; Nuovi racconti d'avventure
- 1922 Viaggi e scoperte; La scacchiera davanti allo specchio (The Chess Set in the Mirror); Ultime avventure
- 1923 Eva ultima (Last Eva)
- 1924 La donna del Nadir
- 1925 La donna dei miei sogni e altre avventure moderne; Nostra Dea
- 1926 L'eden della tartaruga
- 1928 Donna nel sole, e altri idilli; Minnie la candida
- 1929 Il figlio di due madri (The Boy with Two Mothers); Il neosofista
- 1930 Vita e morte di Adria e dei suoi figli (The Life and Death of Adria and Her Children)
- 1931 Mia vita, morte e miracoli; Stato d grazia
- 1932 La famiglia del fabbro; Racconto di una giornata; Valoria
- 1934 La fame
- 1935 Nembo (Stormcloud)
- 1934 Galleria degli schiavi; Bassano padre geloso
- 1937 Gente nel tempo (People in Time)
- 1938 L'avventura novecentista
- 1941 Giro del sole
- 1942 Sette discorsi; Cenerentola (Cinderella)
- 1945 Le notti (The Nights); L'acqua (Water)
- 1946 L'ottuagenaria
- 1947 Venezia Salva
- 1949 L'innocenza di Camilla
- 1953 L'amante fedele (The Faithful Lover)

== Works in English translation ==
— The Elevator Man. The Living Age, 1 October 1926, pp. 68–71.
— The Good Wind.'' The Living Age, 1 July 1927, pp. 44–47.
— Foundations. The Living Age, 15 September 1927, pp. 549–551.
— Sweet Adeline. The Living Age, 15 April 1928, pp. 720–722.
— Meeting Batoletti — A Railway Station Extravaganza. The Living Age, 15 March 1930, pp. 115–120.
— Letters of Introduction Translated by W.L. Dale. The Cornhill Magazine, No. 1030, Winter 1961/62 pages 268-271.
— Dea by Dea. Translated by Anthony Oldcorn in Twentieth-Century Italian Drama: An Anthology, the First Fifty Years, ed. Jane House and Antonio Attisani (New York: Columbia UP, 1995).
—Separations: Two Novels of Mothers and Children (Figlio di due madri / The Boy with Two Mothers and Vita e morte di Adria e dei suoi figli / The Life and Death of Adria and Her Children). Translated by Estelle Gilson. McPherson & Co, 2000.
— The Divine Miss D and Genuine Minnie in The Italian Theater of the Grotesque. A New Theater for the Twentieth Century: An Anthology, ed. and trans. Jack D. Street and Rod Umlas (Lewiston, NY: Edwin Mellen, 2003).
—The Chess Set in the Mirror (La scacchiera davanti allo specchio). Translated by Estelle Gilson. Illustrated by Sergio Tofano. Paul Dry Books, 2006.
—The Faithful Lover (L'amante fedele). Translated by Estelle Gilson with an introduction by Luigi Fontanella. Host Publications, 2007,
—On A Locomotive & Other Runaway Tales. Translated by Gilbert Alter-Gilbert. Xenos Book, 2013.
—Watching the Moon and Other Plays. Translation and introduction by Patricia Gaborik. Italica Press, 2013. Also includes Stormcloud and Cinderella.

== See also ==
- Fascism
- Italian Fascism
- Futurism (literature)
