= "900", Cahiers d'Italie et d'Europe =

Italian magazine

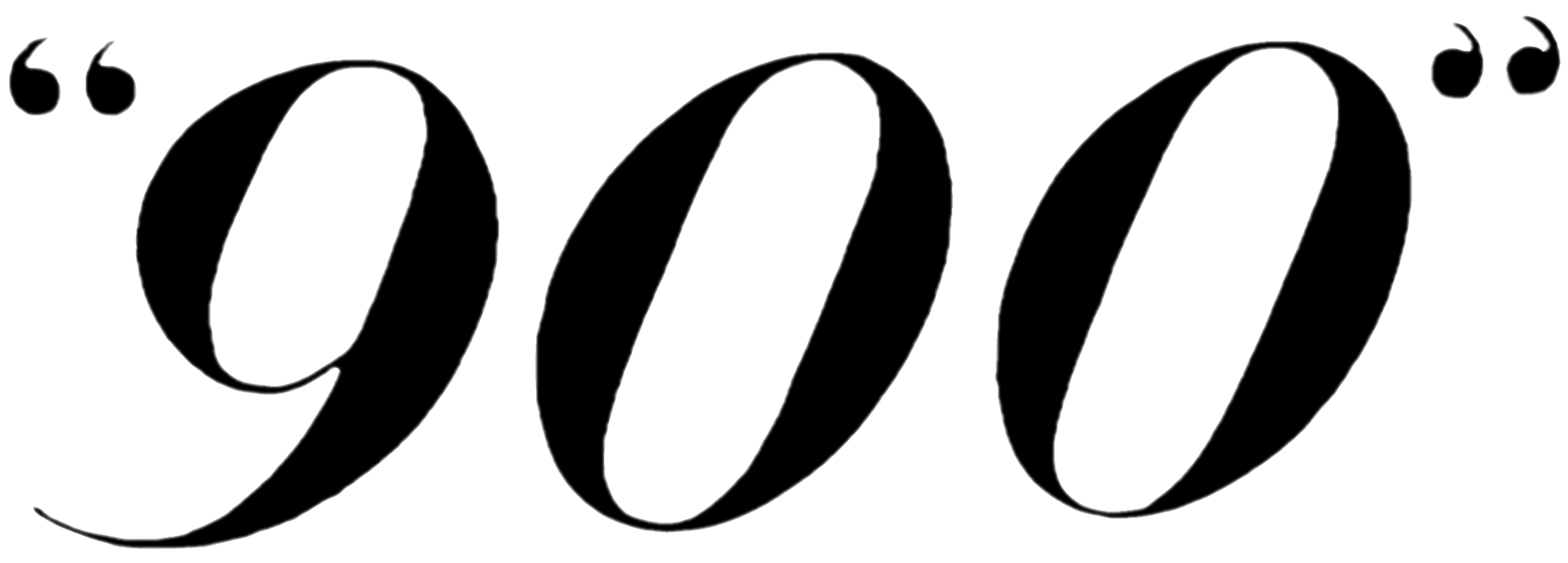
- First issue: November 1926
- Final issue: June 1929
- Country: Italy
- Based in: Rome
- Language: Italian

"900", Cahiers d'Italie et d'Europe was an Italian magazine published for the first time in November 1926, directed by Massimo Bontempelli with Curzio Malaparte as co-director. Beginning as an internationalist publication, after some numbers it dramatically changed its editorial line, rallying to the nationalist, strapaesani line of the magazine Il Selvaggio.

== History ==
The magazine was named "900" as it was conceived as part of the Novecento Italiano artistic movement. On its launch in 1926, it was received by "a storm of discussion, almost all hostile" by the strapaesano and fascist environment, but it had very important editors like Ramón Gómez de la Serna, James Joyce, Georg Kaiser, and Pierre Mac Orlan. The magazine was founded by Massimo Bontempelli and was based in Rome. Editorial officers were Corrado Alvaro, in Rome, and the Nino Frank from Paris.

The first four preambles, Giustification, Basis, Advices, Analogies were published in French in the journals of autumn 1926, March and June 1927. (They were translated into Italian in 1938 by Bontempelli himself.) They set out the main principles of Novecentism, but later editions abandoned internationalism, were written exclusively in Italian, and switched to a patriotic, nationalist approach in line with Fascist policy.

In three years only, "900" hosted the dadaist Georges Ribemont-Dessaignes and the surrealist Soupault; it published, for the first time in Italy, translated paragraphs from Ulysses by James Joyce and from Mrs Dalloway by Virginia Woolf; it published also a George Grosz profile written by Yvan Goll, inedited texts by Anton Chekhov and a short story by Tolstoy. Others who wrote for the magazine included Alberto Moravia and Ilya Ehrenburg.

The magazine closed in June 1929.

== See also ==
- List of magazines published in Italy
