= Giuseppe Pontiggia =

Italian writer (1934–2003)

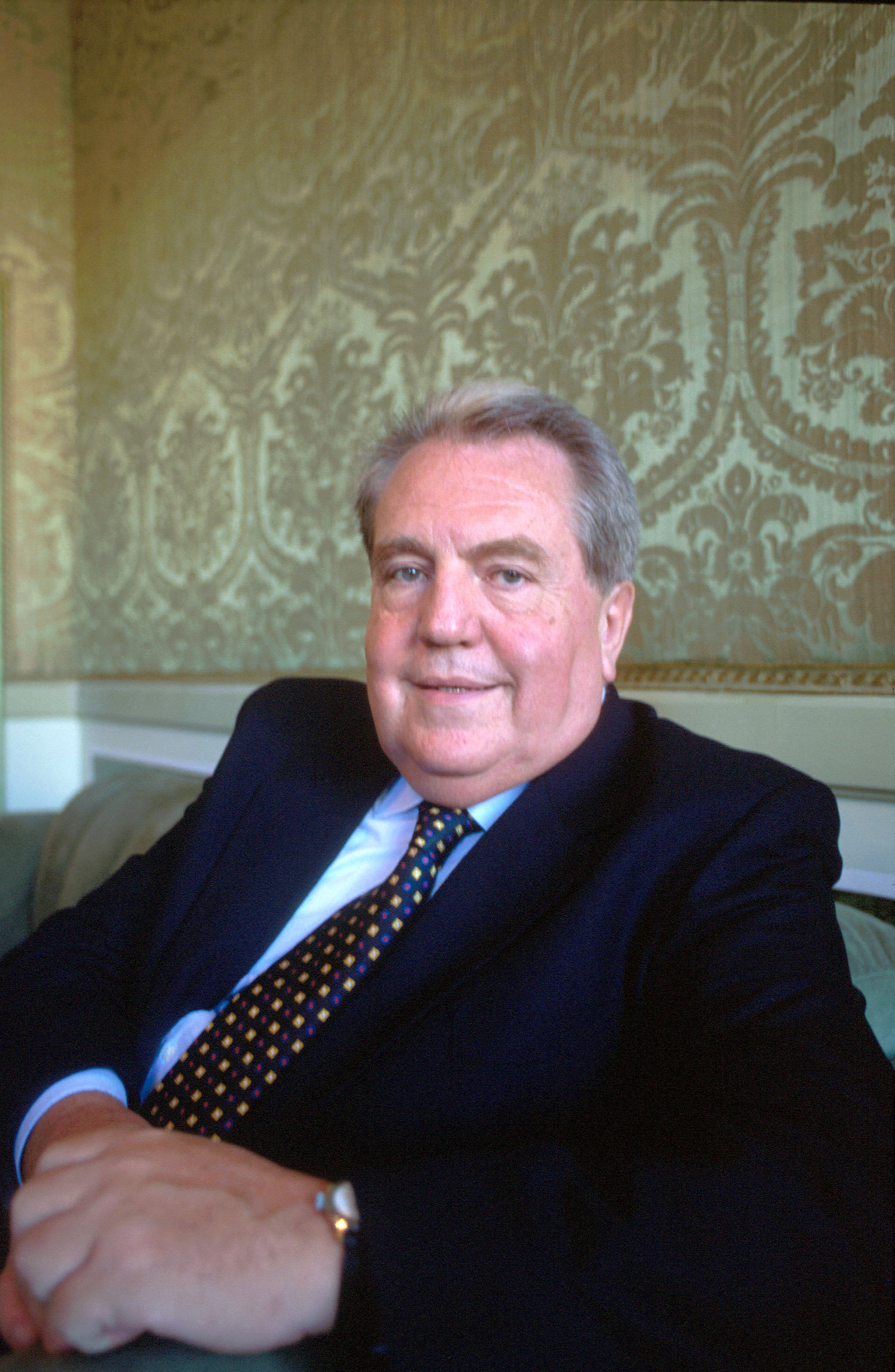
Giuseppe Pontiggia in 1994

Giuseppe Pontiggia (Italian pronunciation: [dʒuˈzɛppe ponˈtiddʒa]; 25 September 1934 – 27 June 2003) was an Italian writer and literary critic.

== Biography ==
He was born in Como, and moved to Milan with his family in 1948. In 1959 he graduated from the Università Cattolica in Milan with a thesis on Italo Svevo. After a first unnoticed short story anthology published in 1959, Pontiggia, encouraged by Elio Vittorini, decided to devote himself entirely to writing starting in 1961.

His first novel was L'arte della fuga in 1968. Pontiggia won the Premio Strega in 1989 with La grande sera and the Premio Campiello in 2001 with Nati due volte. He also wrote numerous articles and essays.

He died in Milan in 2003 of a circulatory stroke. He was an atheist.

== Bibliography ==
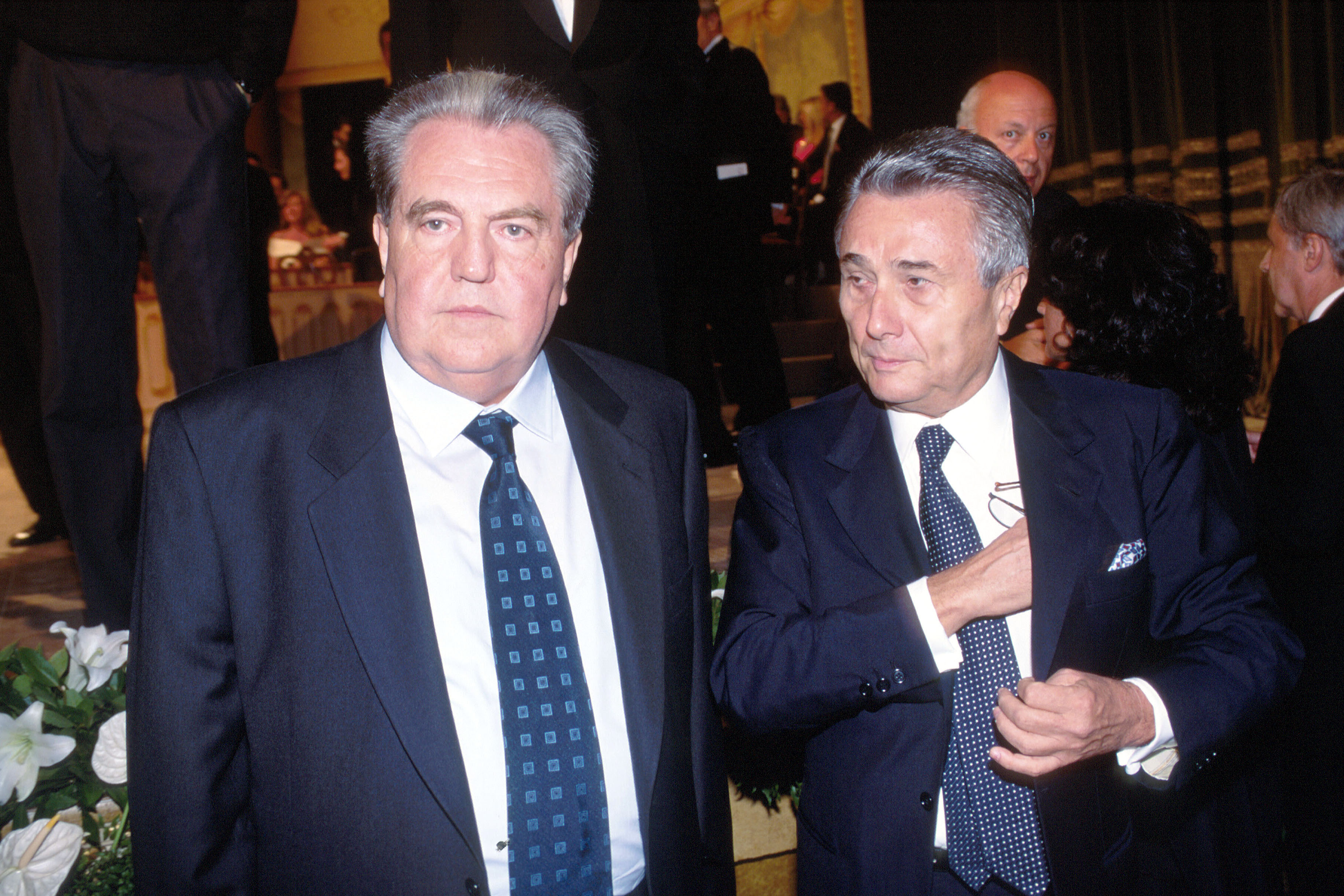
Giuseppe Pontiggia with Alberto Arbasino

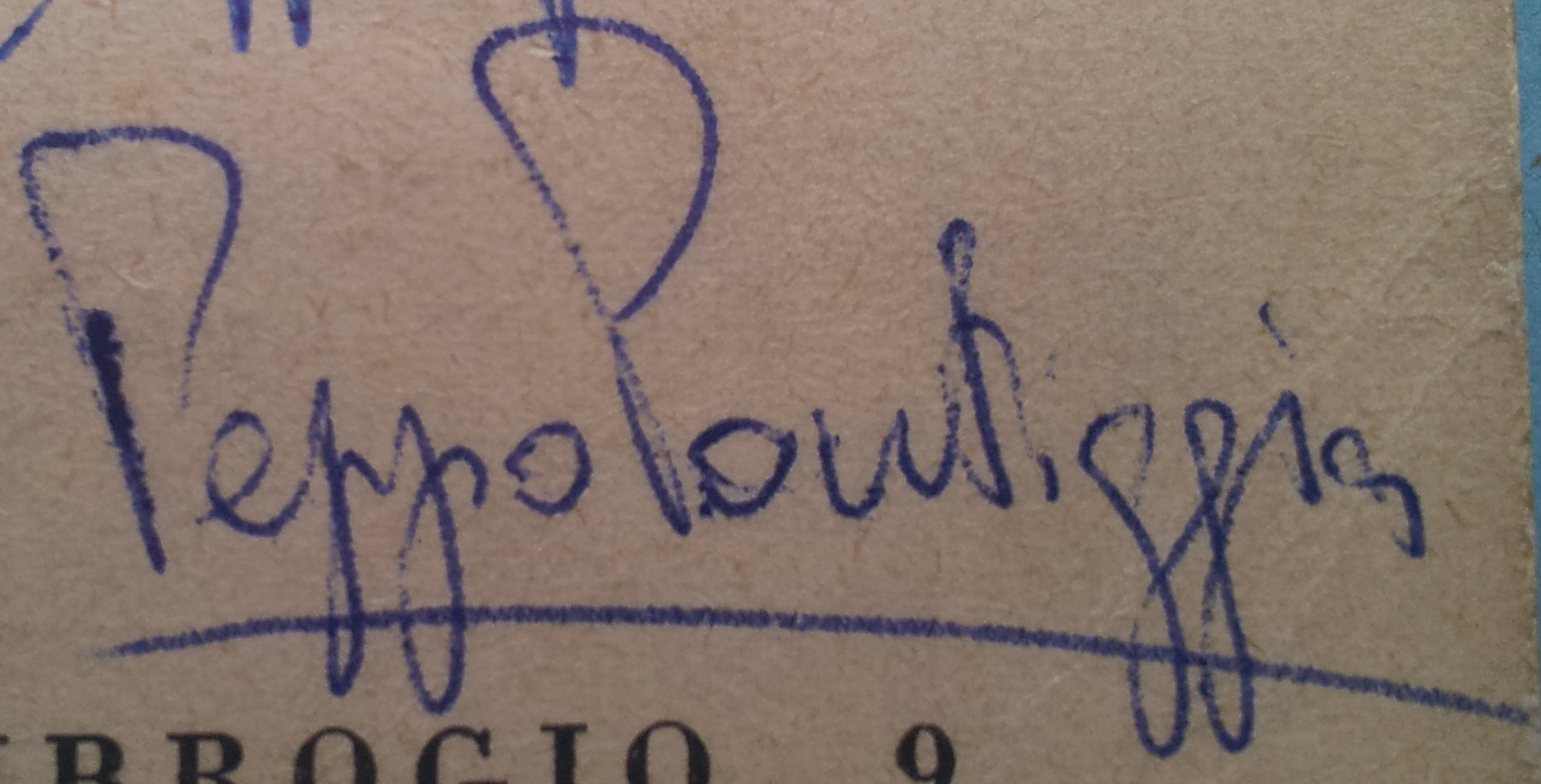
Giuseppe Pontiggia autograph

=== Essays ===
- Il giardino delle Esperidi (1984)
- Le sabbie immobili (1991)
- L'isola volante (1996)
- I contemporanei del futuro (1998)

=== Novels and short story anthologies ===
- La morte in banca (1959)
- L'arte della fuga (1968; 1990 revised)
- Il giocatore invisibile (1978)
- Il raggio d'ombra (1983)
- La grande sera (1989)
- Vite di uomini non illustri (1994)
- Nati due volte (2000)
- Prima persona (2002)
- Il residence delle ombre cinesi (2003, posthumous)
