= Cesare Garboli =

Italian writer (1928-2004)

Cesare Garboli (Viareggio, 17 December 1928 - Rome, 11 April 2004) was an Italian literary and theatre critic, translator, writer and academic.

== Early life and career ==
A native of Viareggio, at the age of 16 he moved to Rome where he graduated from the "Dante Alighieri" state high school. A pupil of Natalino Sapegno at Sapienza - University of Rome, he graduated with a thesis on Dante's Comedy; at the age of twenty-four (1952), he published in "Società" an essay on contemporary Dante criticism, which was followed in 1954 by a volume on Dante considered by specialists to be a remarkable work.

In the years following the last world war and after graduating, in 1954 Garboli began working as an editor of the Enciclopedia dello Spettacolo, founded by Silvio D'Amico, but his interest in theatre alternated with editorial work and so, in 1959, the edition of the Canti di Leopardi was published and then republished by Einaudi in 1962. In the same year he became a member of the editorial board of the magazine Paragone Letteratura founded just three years earlier by Roberto Longhi and Anna Banti, taking over its direction in 1986.

In 1963 he began his publishing activity, destined to last about twenty years, alternating between Feltrinelli, Vallecchi and Mondadori publishers. Four years later together with Alberto Mondadori Cesare Garboli founded the new publishing house Il Saggiatore. Upon returning from a trip to New York (1968), he published the translation and introduction to the third act of Tartuffe in Paragone and won the Viareggio "Opera Prima" Prize for his collection of essays and articles in volume La stanza separata.

His career as a university lecturer began in 1971 when he became the holder of a professorship at the University of Macerata and lecturer at the Federal Polytechnic of Zurich, and at the same time he collaborated with Mario Soldati for television programs. The following year, due to these overlaps of different and distant interests, he was induced to resign from university professorships and return to work for Mondadori again, resuming, among others, his precious activity as a translator. His translations, for the press and for the stage, of Shakespeare, Marivaux, André Gide and Harold Pinter are among the best known, but through the translation of Molière, an author whom he will resume several times over the years, and with whom he also hears commonality and conceptual affinity, he was published in 1976 with Einaudi Molière. Essays and translations.

He continued to work for the major national newspapers. After moving from Rome to Vado, a fraction of the municipality of Camaiore, he entered the phase of the most intense work activity, combining his studies for Dom Juan with those for Pascoli.

The knowledge over time of a fundamental person for one's own experience like the poet Sandro Penna led Garboli to publish in 1984 the collection of essays Penna Papers. Shortly thereafter he accepted Natalino Sapegno's invitation to take part in the jury of the Viareggio Prize, remaining responsible for it until 1992. He returned to Molière in 1989, when the Scritti servili was released, a volume that collects seven introductory essays to as many authors, emblematically all Italians dating back to the twentieth century (Antonio Delfini, Sandro Penna, Elsa Morante, Natalia Ginzburg, Roberto Longhi, Mario Soldati), with the exception of Molière, to whom Garboli always seemed to be particularly interested. In the increasingly frenetic and compulsive desire to write, Garboli published two essays in 1990.

The first, is a singular work entitled Falbalas. Images of the '900, contain disparate writings on various themes, on the passing of time held still on certain images: the face of a friend, the legend of Longhi, the intellectual torment of Italo Calvino, the visceral one of Morante, the ghosts of Giovanni Macchia, the genius of Petrolini, the forced ideas of Giovanni Testori, the darkness and clarity of Franco Fortini, the life of Goffredo Parise, the poetry of Montale, Bertolucci, Sereni and Giovanni Raboni. Garboli wrote: "in its journey through the ephemeral, time encounters obstacles from time to time, makes small wrinkles, and each of these wrinkles is one of Falbalas articles (for me who wrote them)".

The second, the anthology Trenta poesie familiari by Giovanni Pascoli, which he then expanded and was his last effort in 2002 with the publication in a box set of two tones of poems and selected prose by Giovanni Pascoli, in the series I Meridiani by Mondadori a poet generally recognized as sad and boring, through a meticulous and intense journey, a Pascoli different from the one studied in high school programs, which, as Garboli himself suggests in the introduction, can be held "in your hands while travelling, or during holidays, or in the evening after dinner, like any other reading book, or even as a detective story, a genre with which Pascoli's poetry, where one often encounters a mysterious murderer without a name and without a face, has some connection ».

In 1991 he edited the edition of the Opere of Mario Soldati and bought an apartment in Paris, in the Latin Quarter (in rue Mazarine), near some Molierian places: the Illustre Théâtre, home to the first Molière theatre, and the 'Hotel de l'Ancienne comédie. A year later he brings to light and publishes the first volume of the "green necklace": the unpublished diary of Matilde Manzoni, indicating in the daughter of the writer, destined to an early death, one of the first and unexpected readers of Leopardi's Canti. In fact, with his usual attention to little-known texts, he curates for the Adelphi publishing house a series of books dedicated to unpublished, unobtainable or forgotten texts, including the volume of Lettere e scartafacci 1912-1957 between Berenson and Longhi. In 1995 The secret game was released. Nine images by Elsa Morante, a monograph on the writer's early writings and the introductory essay for the monumental edition of Chateaubriand's Mémoires d'Outre-Tombe (Memoirs from Beyond the Grave).

Just after a year, he published the comparative study on two authors Penna, Montale and the desire and then Un po' prima del piombo published in 1998, a volume that contains 134 pieces that appeared in Il Mondo and Corriere della Sera between 1978. These are mainly theatrical reviews, but in a climate that clearly reflects, already from the title, the heavy decade of the Red Brigades. In the same year in Paris, he was awarded the title of Chevalier de l'ordre des arts e des lettres.

In 2001 he published some essays by Einaudi entitled Ricordi tristi e civil: conversations, articles, interviews and reviews commenting on the most famous cultural and political events of the last decades of the 20th century, already published between 1972 and 1998. Reviewed by Eugenio Scalfari for the newspaper la Repubblica, they range from the murder of Aldo Moro to the Enzo Tortora case, from the suicide of Raul Gardini to Loggia P2, from Operation Gladio to the political agreement known as CAF (between Craxi, Andreotti and Forlani), a prelude to that perverse form of disintegration of the moral conscience and of the Italian social fabric remembered with the neologism of "Tangentopoli".

Some of the contents that have already appeared in Scritti servili, are re-proposed in 2002 in the collection of essays Pianura proibita which earned them the "Elsa Morante Prize" for non-fiction and in which the authors treated are Mario Soldati, Italo Calvino, Goffredo Parise, Raffaele La Capria, Roberto Longhi, Anna Banti, Giorgio Bassani.

In the last months of 2003, despite a profound physical weakness, he continued his work as a critic; later, due to the worsening of the disease, he was admitted to the "Quisisana" clinic. He died in Rome on 11 April 2004, leaving behind two posthumous works: Stories of seduction and Molière's «Dom Juan».

== The work ==
Cesare Garboli appears to be an anomalous figure in the panorama of Italian criticism of the last part of the last century, due to the multiplicity of interests and the originality of the musical writing, very rich in tonality, capable of orchestrating the most diverse ingredients: sensitivity, finesse psychological and a narrative vein that is expressed in a particular ability to use a sense of humour and to tell through images that are not always happy.

Garboli was an original interpreter of Italian literature, one of the leading protagonists of literary criticism and Italian culture of the second half of the twentieth century. His work was always directed in plurality of interests, like critical essays, journalism and theatrical activity.

It has a creative, original form that crosses the paths of historical research with those of scientific essayism or even presides over the transformation of the experience or the historian according to the imaginary. In particular, he has dealt with Dante, Leopardi, Pascoli, Delfini, Longhi, Penna, Montale, Natalia Ginzburg, Elsa Morante (for which in 1995 he edited an introduction to the reprint for the twenty years since the publication of the novel La Storia) and Mario Soldati.

Passionate translator for the theatre, in particular with his original hypotheses about Tartufo, Don Giovanni and Il Malato imaginario, he determined the revival in Italy of the interest in Molière's theatre.

== Works ==
=== Essays ===
- La stanza separata, Mondadori, 1969; Libri Scheiwiller, 2008
- Molière. Saggi e traduzioni, Einaudi, 1976
- Penna papers, Garzanti, 1984, 1996
- Scritti servili, Einaudi, 1989
- Trenta poesie famigliari di Giovanni Pascoli, Einaudi, 1990, 2000
- Falbalas. Immagini del Novecento, Garzanti, 1991
- Il gioco segreto. Nove immagini di Elsa Morante, Adelphi, 1995
- Penna, Montale e il desiderio, Mondadori, 1996
- (con Giorgio Manganelli) Cento libri per due secoli di letteratura, Archinto, 1997
- Un po' prima del piombo, Sansoni, 1998
- Ricordi tristi e civili, Einaudi, 2001
- Pianura proibita, Adelphi, 2002
- Storie di seduzione, Einaudi, 2005, postumo
- Occidente tra dubbi e paure, Passigli, 2005, postumo
- Il Dom Juan di Molière, Adelphi, 2005, postumo
- Occidente tra dubbi e paura, Passigli, 2005, postumo
- Tartufo, Adelphi, 2014, postumo
- La gioia della partita. Scritti 1950-1977, a cura di Laura Desideri e Domenico Scarpa, Adelphi, 2016, postumo

=== Translations and as curator ===
- curatela di Dante Alighieri, La Divina Commedia, le Rime, i versi della Vita Nuova e le canzoni del Convivio, i millenni, Einaudi, 1954
- (con Niccolò Gallo) curatela di Giacomo Leopardi, Canti, Einaudi, 1962
- (con Renata Orengo Debenedetti) curatela di Giacomo Debenedetti, Opere, Il Saggiatore, 1970
- introduzione a Annie Vivanti, Naja tripudians, Mondadori, 1970
- presentazione di L'opera completa di Guido Reni, Rizzoli, 1971
- curatela di Ennio Flaiano, Autobiografia del blu di Prussia, Rizzoli, 1974
- curatela di I disegni di Testori 1973-1974, Edizioni del Naviglio, 1975
- (con Ottavio Cecchi e Gian Carlo Roscioni) curatela di Scritti letterari di Niccolò Gallo, Il Polifilo, 1975
- prefazione a Harold Pinter, Terra di nessuno, Einaudi, 1976
- prefazione a Ramon Fernandez, Moliere, o L'essenza del comico, Rusconi, 1980
- prefazione ad: Antonio Delfini, Diari 1927-1961, Einaudi, 1982
- curatela di Giovanni Pascoli, Poesie famigliari, Mondadori, 1985
- prefazione a Natalia Ginzburg, Opere. Raccolte e ordinate dall'autore, Mondadori, 1986–87
- prefazione e traduzione di Pierre de Marivaux, Le false confidenze, Einaudi, 1986
- prefazione a Elsa Morante, Pro o contro la bomba atomica, Adelphi, 1987 e 1990
- (con Carlo Cecchi) curatela di Elsa Morante, Opere, Mondadori, 1988
- prefazione a Sandro Penna, Poesie, Garzanti, 1989
- prefazione a Rosetta Loy, All'insaputa della notte, Garzanti, 1990
- curatela di Mario Soldati, Racconti autobiografici e Romanzi brevi, Rizzoli, 1991
- introduzione a Roberto Longhi, Breve ma veridica storia della pittura italiana, Sansoni, 1992
- traduzione di William Shakespeare, Misura per misura, Einaudi, 1992
- prefazione a Agostino Richelmy, Poesie, Garzanti, 1992
- curatela di Matilde Manzoni, Journal, Adelphi, 1992
- curatela di Bernard Berenson e Roberto Longhi, Lettere e scartafacci, 1912-1957, Adelphi, 1993
- (con Giacomo Magrini) curatela di Goffredo Parise, L'odore del sangue, Rizzoli, 1994
- (con Ivanna Rosi) curatela di François-René de Chateaubriand, Memorie d'oltretomba, Einaudi, 1995
- prefazione a Roberto Longhi, Il palazzo non finito : saggi inediti 1910-1926, Electa, 1995
- curatela de La famosa attrice di anonimo del XVII secolo, Adelphi, 1997
- curatela di Antonio Delfini, Manifesto per un partito conservatore e comunista e altri scritti, Garzanti, 1997, Premio Monselice per la traduzione.
- (con Lisa Ginzburg) curatela di Natalia Ginzburg, È difficile parlare di sé, Einaudi, 1999
- curatela di François-René de Chateaubriand, Di Buonaparte e dei Borboni, Adelphi, 2000
- curatela di Giovanni Pascoli, Poesie e prose scelte, Mondadori, 2002

== Bibliography ==
- Giosetta Fioroni, Dossier Vado. Ricordi figurativi della casa di Cesare Garboli (Corraini, 1993)
- Laura Desideri, Bibliografia di Cesare Garboli (1950-2005), (Pisa, Edizioni della Normale, 2008)
- Marisa Volpi, Cesare Garboli: lo strano caso di Longhi e B. B., in “Il Giornale”, 15 aprile 1989, ora in L’occhio senza tempo. Saggi di critica e storia dell’arte contemporanea, Lithos, Roma 2008, pp. 287–289
- La critica impossibile. Conversazioni con Cesare Garboli, a cura di Silvia Lutzoni (Medusa, 2014)
- Rosetta Loy, Cesare, (Einaudi, Torino 2018)
