= NGC 3147 =

Galaxy in the constellation Draco

- NGC 3147 imaged by the Hubble Space Telescope

Observation data (J2000 epoch)
- Constellation: Draco
- Right ascension: 10^{h} 16^{m} 53.6504^{s}
- Declination: +73° 24′ 02.695″
- Redshift: 0.009346±0.000003
- Heliocentric radial velocity: 2,802±1 km/s
- Distance: 129 ± 29 Mly (39.6 ± 8.9 Mpc)
- Apparent magnitude (V): 10.6

Characteristics
- Type: SA(rs)bc
- Size: ~176,600 ly (54.16 kpc) (estimated)
- Apparent size (V): 3.9′ × 3.5′
- Notable features: Seyfert galaxy

Other designations
- IRAS 10126+7339, UGC 5532, MCG +12-10-025, PGC 30019, CGCG 333-022

NGC 3147 is a spiral galaxy located in the constellation Draco. It is located at a distance of about 130 million light years from Earth, which, given its apparent dimensions, means that NGC 3147 is about 140,000 light years across. It was discovered by German-British astronomer William Herschel on April 3, 1785.

== Structure ==
The galaxy has a small and bright nucleus and tightly wound multiple spiral arms. The overall appearance of the galaxy resembles that of NGC 488, however the nuclear bulge is smaller. The arms consist of spiral segments that branch after approximately one quarter of a revolution. HII regions can be detected in the arms.

=== Active galactic nucleus ===
NGC 3147 has been characterised as a Seyfert II galaxy. It is considered the best candidate to be a true type II Seyfert galaxy, galaxies which feature optical/UV spectrum lacking broad emission lines due to the lack of the broad line region rather than its obscuration, since the nucleus is simultaneously seen unobscured in the X-rays.

The galaxy was observed simultaneously in the optical and X-ray spectrum by Bianchi et al. and concluded that the X-ray spectrum is unabsorbed while its optical spectrum lacks broad lines, a mismatch with respect to the Unification Model. Brightman et al. confirmed their findings and also noted that the hard X-ray flux dropped by a factor of ~2 between the observation by Chandra (2001) and XMM-Newton (2006). Further flux variation was observed by Suzaku in 2010, confirming the variability of the source. The nuclear emission in the UV band shows negligible variability. Shi et al. used data from Spitzer Space Telescope and ground-based optical spectropolarimeteric observations and observed lack of polarised broad emission lines in NGC 3147. NGC 3147 was observed by NuSTAR at the 3-40 keV X-ray spectrum, which is characterised by a simple power-law, with a standard Γ ~ 1.7 and an iron emission line, with no need for any further component up to ~ 40 keV.

There is a debate whether the lack of broad lines detection observed with NGC 3147 is caused by the presence of a Compton-thick column with the presence of a highly ionised reflector to account for the X-ray spectrum or not. Bianchi et al. rejected the presence of a Compton thick column on the grounds of low-equivalent width of the iron Kα line (≃130 eV), and of the large ratio between hard X-ray and [O III] fluxes. Birghtman et al. confirmed their findings using data from XMM-Newton and Chandra. They also found that the X-ray flux is variable, meaning that the nucleus may be observed directly. However, they noted the presence of a Compton-thick column cannot be ruled out. The observations by Suzaku in the hard X-rays spectrum did not cast more light, but along with the observations performed by XMM-Newton put tight constraints on the column density.

After the observations by NuStar in 2015, Bianchi et al. concluded that the spectral properties and the significant variability on time-scales as short as weeks strongly support an unobscured line-of-sight for the nucleus of NGC 3147 and the Compton-thick scenario is strongly disfavoured.

In 2018, Bianchi et al. detected a broad Hα emission line with a full width at zero intensity (FWZI) of approximately 27,000 km/s in spectra obtained using the Space Telescope Imaging Spectrograph (STIS) aboard the Hubble Space Telescope. This finding confirmed the presence of a broad line region in NGC 3147. They suggested that its previous non-detection was attributable to the combined effects of an extremely broadened emission line profile and the intrinsic weakness of the line relative to the host galaxy emission. Based on these findings, they concluded that NGC 3147 is not a true type II AGN, but rather a type I AGN with a low accretion rate black hole.

=== Central black hole with thin disk ===
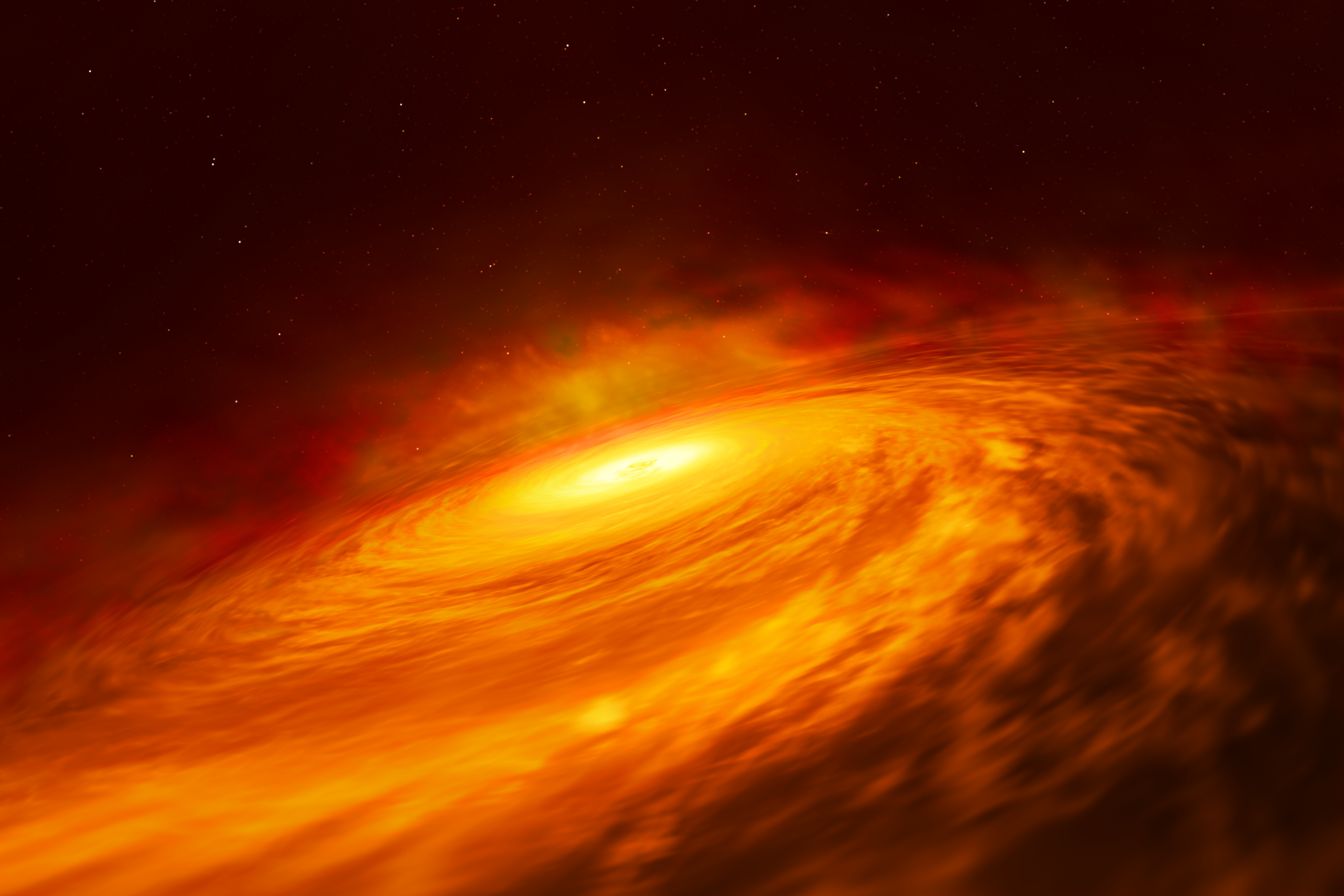
Artist's impression of NGC 3147 black hole disc.

In July 2019 researchers using the Hubble Space Telescope Imaging Spectrograph reported the presence of a thin disk of material around a supermassive black hole at the center of NGC 3147. The black hole is 250 million times as massive as the Sun. Black holes at the center of galaxies of such low activity have been considered to be "malnourished" or "starving", that is, little or no material would be falling into the black hole to feed it. The presence of a disk that is similar to the much brighter disks surrounding the black hole of more active galaxies was surprising, since models of low activity galaxies did not predict it. The disk is also unusual because it is deep within the gravitational well of the black hole and rotates around it at more than 10% of the speed of light. Its high velocity results in the effect known as relativistic beaming, in which the light coming from the side moving toward the Earth is brighter than that coming from the side that is receding.

== Supernovae ==
Six supernovae have been discovered in NGC 3147:

- SN 1972H (type unknown, mag. 15.4) was discovered by Vitali Petrovic Goranskij (Виталий Петрович Горанский) on 4 August 1972. Although no spectroscopic observations were made, the probability that SN 1972H is a Type Ia supernova is very high.
- SN 1997bq (Type Ia, mag. 16.1) was discovered by Stephen Laurie on 7 April 1997.
- SN 2006gi (Type Ib, mag. 16.3) was discovered by Kōichi Itagaki on 18 August 2006.
- SN 2008fv (Type Ia, mag. 16.5) was discovered by Kōichi Itagaki on 27 September 2008.
- SN 2021do (Type Ic, mag. 20) was discovered by the Zwicky Transient Facility on 2 January 2021.
- SN 2021hpr (Type Ia, mag. 17.7) was discovered by Kōichi Itagaki on 2 April 2021.

== Nearby galaxies ==
NGC 3147 is the brightest galaxy in the NGC 3147 group, which also includes NGC 3155, UGC 5570, UGC 5686, and UGC 5689. A bit further away lie NGC 3183, NGC 3348, NGC 3364, and NGC 3516.

== See also ==
- NGC 6814 - a similar galaxy
- List of NGC objects (3001–4000)
