= When Mimi Went Missing =

2024 novel by Suja Sukumar

- First edition cover
- Author: Suja Sukumar
- Genre: Psychological thriller
- Publication date: November 19, 2024
- ISBN: 978-1-641-29536-9

When Mimi Went Missing is a young adult novel by Suja Sukumar, originally published on November 19, 2024, by Soho Press. It is her debut novel.

== Reception ==
Kayla Chamberlain of School Library Journal said that the novel is "a quick and riveting mystery with fantastic representation", especially praising its psychological thriller elements. Kirkus Reviews called the novel "a quick read that fails to coalesce into a coherent whole", citing the "shallow" character development and a "muddy" timescale. The review particularly criticized the character of Beth, who they called a "mean girl stereotype". Wesley Jacques, reviewing for The Bulletin of the Center for Children's Books, concluded, "Agatha Christie this is not; but a Pretty Little Liars-sized itch can be scratched for readers that can stomach some clumsy execution of an otherwise heartbreaking missing-person mystery."
