= Timothy Williams (author) =

British author

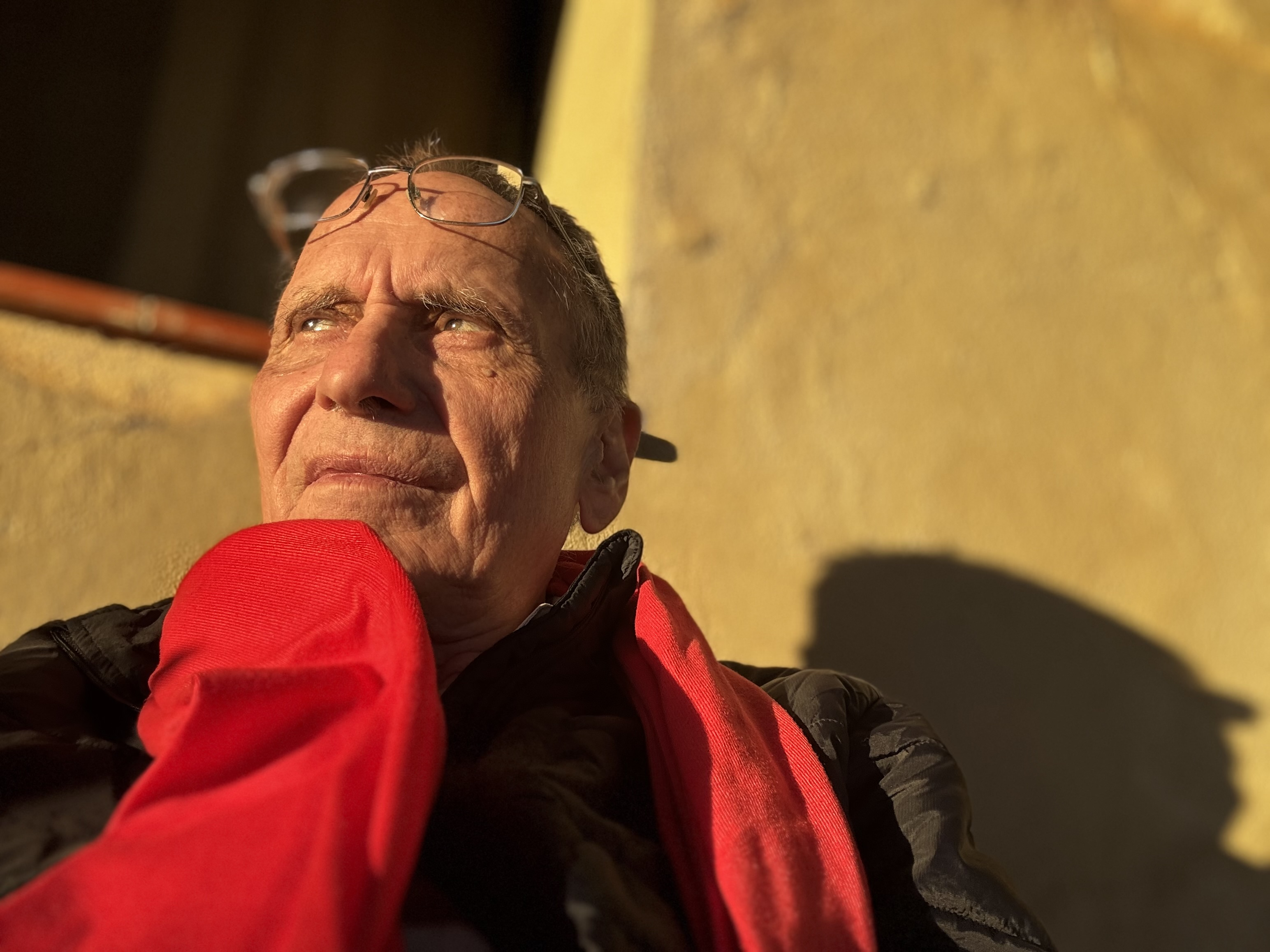
- Born: 1946 (age 79–80); London, England
- Writing career
- Genre: Crime fiction
- Website: timothywilliams.uk.com

Timothy Williams (born 1946) is a bilingual British author who has written six novels in English featuring Commissario Piero Trotti, a character critics have referred to as a personification of modern Italy. Williams' books include Black August, which won a Crime Writers' Association award. His novels have been translated into French, Italian, Danish, Russian, Bulgarian, Polish, and Japanese.

Williams' first French novel, Un autre soleil, set in the Caribbean island of Guadeloupe, was published in Paris by Rivages in March 2011 and was published in English in New York City in April 2013 as Another Sun.

Williams was born in Walthamstow (Essex, now London) and attended Woodford Green Preparatory School, Chigwell School and St Andrews University. He has previously lived in France, Italy, and in Romania, where he worked for the British Council.

Williams is also the author of a series of crime novels set in Guadeloupe in the French West Indies featuring Anne Marie Laveaud, a juge d'instruction. Williams, who holds dual British/French citizenship, currently lives on the island of Guadeloupe and teaches in the main lycée of Pointe à Pitre.

For the Observer Timothy Williams is one of the ten best European crime novelists. "The five books in Williams’s Commissario Trotti series, written from 1982–96, are hard to find, but if you liked Zen (Dibdin’s books or the TV series) you’ll enjoy Trotti just as much. A delight."

== Trotti novels ==
The first five Trotti novels were originally published by Gollancz in London. They are now available in paperback edition from Soho Publishing. The sixth novel, The Second Day of the Renaissance, was published by Soho Publishing in May 2017.

Commissario Trotti investigates crime in a small, unnamed city on the river Po in the north of Italy (sometimes erroneously identified as Padua, but more close to Pavia, at least for "Converging Parallels"). Trotti's career spans much of the First Republic, from the period known as the Italian Miracle through the Anni di Piombo. This milieu keeps the Polizia di Stato busy and in his enquiries Trotti frequently confronts problems facing Italian society: terrorism, political instability, corruption, socialism under Craxi, Operation Clean Hands (mani pulite), and above all, the decline of civilised intercourse.

Writing in a minimalist style, in which he relies largely on dialogue to advance the plot, Williams has at times been considered a demanding author. One critic complained that the books read like translations from Italian. Some readers find that pace and tension are sacrificed for sociology and politics and that the moody, brooding Trotti, addicted to rhubarb sweets, is too slow and too wordy for their taste.

== Guadeloupe novels ==
There are two novels with protagonist Anne-Marie Laveaud, an investigative magistrate based in Pointe-à-Pitre in the French island of Guadeloupe.

In 2012 Rivages Noir published Un autre soleil, a crime novel set in the island département of Guadeloupe, in the French Caribbean. In 2013, the book was published by Soho Crime. In 1980, the ex-convict, Hegesippe Bray, returning home after forty years spent in the penal colony of Cayenne, has been charged with the murder of a white landowner who was running him off his property. Nine months before the French presidential elections of 1981, for political reasons, the authorities wish to view the murder as an open-and-shut case of revenge killing. Anne Marie Laveaud, the juge d'instruction (investigative magistrate) in charge of the case, does not agree. To learn the truth, she will put herself, her career and her family in jeopardy.

== Publications ==
The Inspector Trotti Novels

1. Converging Parallels (London: Gollancz, 1982; ISBN 978-0-575-03125-8)(New York: Soho Press, 2014; ISBN 1616954604)
2. The Puppeteer (London: Gollancz, 1985; ISBN 978-0-575-04753-2)
3. Persona Non Grata (London: Gollancz, 1987; ISBN 978-0-575-04082-3)
4. Black August (London: Orion, 1992; ISBN 978-0-575-05307-6)
5. Big Italy (London: Orion, 1996; ISBN 978-0-575-05929-0)
6. The Second Day of the Renaissance (New York: Soho, 2017; ISBN 978-1-61695-720-9)

The Anne Marie Laveaud Novels

1. Another Sun (New York: Soho, 2013; ISBN 1616951567)
2. The Honest Folk of Guadeloupe (New York: Soho, 2014; ISBN 1616953853)

=== in French ===
- Un autre soleil (Paris Rivages 2011; ISBN 978-2-7436-2216-9)
