= Premio Monselice =

Italian literary award

The Premio Monselice per la traduzione letteraria e scientifica (Monselice Prize for Literary and Scientific Translation) was an Italian award established "to enhance the activity of translation as a particularly important form of cultural communication between peoples".

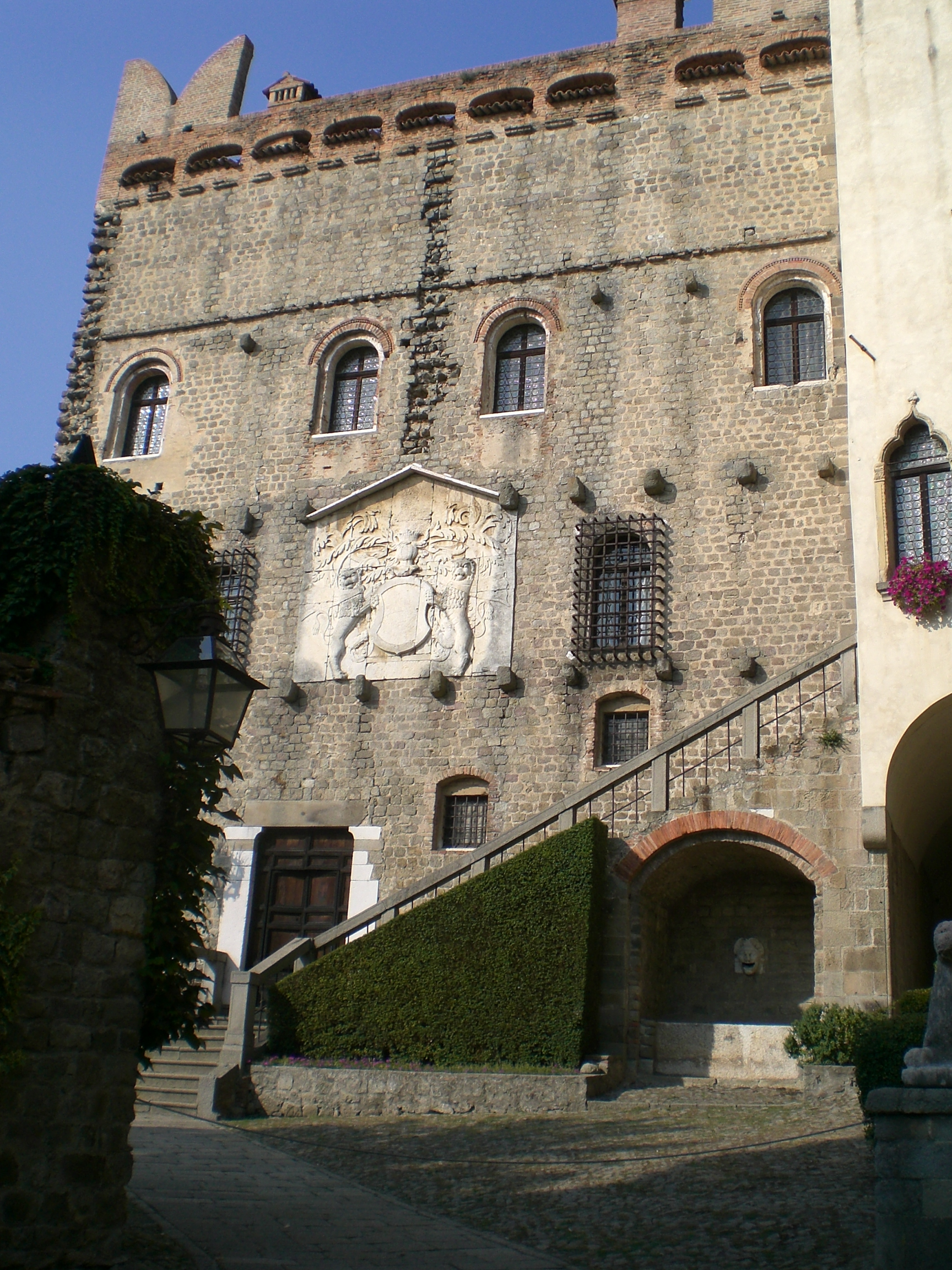
The Monselice Castle, venue of the award ceremony.

Founded in 1971 by Gianfranco Folena, it was organized every year by the municipality of Monselice in collaboration with the University of Padua. The award ceremony usually took place at the Monselice Castle. The prize secretariat was located at the Municipal Library of Monselice.

Two main prizes and three collateral prizes were awarded:

- "City of Monselice" Prize for Literary Translation
- "City of Monselice" Prize for Scientific Translation (since 1980)
- "Leone Traverso" First Work Prize – awarded to a young Italian translator for their first work, published in the last two years (since 1973)
- International Prize "Diego Valeri" – dedicated to the translation of an Italian literature work into a foreign language (since 1979)
- Didactic Prize "Vittorio Zambon" – in two versions, one reserved for middle school students in Monselice, the other for high school students in the province of Padua.

Notable winners include Fernanda Pivano, Mary de Rachewiltz, Giorgio Caproni, William Weaver.

The organization of the Prize ceased its operations in 2013.

== "City of Monselice" Prize for Literary Translation ==
Ed.	Year	Recipient	Translated work	Publisher
I	1971	Franco Fortini	J. W. Goethe, Faust	Mondadori, Milano 1970
II	1972	Filippo Maria Pontani	G. Seferis, Poesia, Prosa	Club degli Editori, Milano, 1971
III	1973	Giorgio Caproni	A. Frénaud, Non c'è paradiso J. Genêt, Tutto il teatro	Rizzoli, Milano, 1971; Il Saggiatore, Milano 1971
IV	1974	Guido Ceronetti	Il libro di Giobbe	Adelphi, Milano 1973
V	1975	Fernanda Pivano	A. Ginsberg, Diario Indiano; A. Ginsberg, Mantra del re di maggio	Arcana, Roma 1973; Mondadori, Milano 1973
VI	1976	Vittorio Sereni	R. Char, Ritorno Sopramonte	Mondadori, Milano 1975
VII	1977	Giovanni Giudici	Sylvia Plath, Lady Lazarus e altre poesie	Mondadori, Milano 1976
VIII	1978	Emilio Castellani	Robert Walser, La passeggiata	Adelphi, Milano 1976
IX	1979	Giacomo Oreglia	G. Edfelt, Dikter	Italica, Roma 1978
X	1980	Adriana Motti	K. Blixen, Ehrengard, Id., Racconti d'inverno	Adelphi, Milano 1979 – 1980
XI	1981	Augusto Frassineti	F. Rabelais, Gargantua e Pantagruele	Sansoni, Firenze 1980
XII	1982	Ernesto Braun; Mario Carpitella	K. Kraus, Gli ultimi giorni dell'umanità	Adelphi, Milano 1980
XIII	1983	Luigi Schenoni	J. Joyce, Finnegans Wake	Mondadori, Milano 1982
XIV	1984	Giorgio Manganelli	E.A. Poe, I racconti	Einaudi, Torino, 1983
XV	1985	Dianella Selvatico Estense	G. Perec, La vita, istruzioni per l'uso	Rizzoli, Milano 1984
XVI	1986	Mary de Rachewiltz	E. Pound, I Cantos	Mondadori, Milano 1985
XVII	1987	Giovanna Calasso	Nēzamī, Leylā e Majnūn	Adelphi, Milano 1985
XVIII	1988	Francesco Tentori Montalto	Poeti ispano-americani del Novecento	Bompiani, Milano 1987
XIX	1989	Serena Vitale	M. Cvetaeva, Dopo la Russia, Id. Il paese dell'anima O. Mandel'Stam , Lettere 1909–1925, Id. Viaggio in Armenia	Milano, Adelphi, 1988; Milano, Adelphi, 1989; Mondadori, Milano 1988
XX	1990	Agostino Richelmy	G. Flaubert, La tentazione di Sant'Antonio	Einaudi, Torino 1990
XXI	1991	Renata Colorni	F. Werfel, Una scrittura femminile azzurro pallido Th. Bernhard, Il nipote di Wittgenstein	Adelphi, Milano 1991; Adelphi, Milano 1989
XXII	1992	Massimo Bacigalupo	W. Wordsworth, Il preludio	Mondadori, Milano 1990
XXIII	1993	Ugo Dotti	F. Petrarca, Le senili	Archivio Guido Izzi, Roma 1993
XXIV	1994	Nelo Risi	Compito di francese e d'altre lingue 1943–1993	Guerrini e Associati, Milano 1994
XXV	1995	Gilberto Forti	Wystan Hugh Auden, La verità, vi prego, sull'amore	Adelphi, Milano 1995
XXVI	1996	Giovanni Cerri	Omero, Iliade	Rizzoli, Milano 1996
XXVII	1997	Cesare Garboli	Anonimo del XVII secolo, La famosa attrice	Adelphi, Milano 1997
XXVIII	1998	Alessandro Serpieri	W. Shakespeare, Il primo Amleto	Marsilio Editori, Venezia 1997
XXIX	1999	Giuseppe Bevilacqua	P. Celan, Poesie	Mondadori, Milano 1998
XXX	2000	Anna Maria Carpi	D. Grünbein, A metà partita	Einaudi, Torino 1999
XXXI	2001	Giovanni Bonalumi	Album inglese. Quaderno di traduzioni (1948–1998)	Moretti-Vitali, Bergamo 2000
XXXII	2002	Michele Ranchetti; Jutta Leskien	P. Celan, Sotto il tiro di presagi. Poesie inedite 1948–1969	Einaudi, Torino 2001
XXXIII	2003	Elena Loewenthal	A. Oz, La scatola nera Sayed Kashua, Arabi danzanti	Feltrinelli, 2002; Ugo Guanda, Parma 2003
XXXIV	2004	Silvia Bortoli	T. Fontane, Romanzi	Mondadori, Milano 2003
XXXV	2005	Monica Centanni	Eschilo, Le Tragedie	Mondadori, Milano 2003
XXXVI	2006	Ariodante Marianni	W.B. Yeats, L'opera poetica	Mondadori, Milano 2005
XXXVII	2007	Ottavio Fatica	R. Kipling, La città della tremenda notte	Adelphi, Milano 2007
XXXVIII	2008	Andrea Molesini	Da poeti a poeta: diario di tradurre	In forma di parole, Bologna 2008
XXXIX	2009	Laura Salmon	Opere di Sergej Dovlatov	
XL	2010	Remo Faccani	Osip Mandel'štam, Ottanta poesie	Torino, Einaudi 2009
XLI	2011	Glauco Felici	Javier Marías, Il tuo volto domani 3. veleno e ombra e addio	Torino, Einaudi 2010
XLII	2012	Luca Salvatore	Lautréamont, I canti di Maldrodor	Milano, Arcipelago, 2012

== "City of Monselice" Prize for Scientific Translation ==
Ed.	Year	Recipient	Translated work	Publisher
X	1980	Libero Sosio	P.K. Feyerabend, Contro il metodo	Feltrinelli, Milano 1979
XI	1981	Vittorio Emiliani	R.A. Hinde, Il comportamento degli animali	Edagricole, Bologna 1980
XII	1982	Lucia Cornalba	H. Hartmann, Fondamenti della psicoanalisi	Feltrinelli, Milano 1981
XIII	1983	Francesco Carnevale; Ines e Vittorio Romano	B. Ramazzini, Le malattie dei lavoratori	La Nuova Italia Scientifica, Roma 1983
XIV	1984	Federico Canobbio-Codelli	H. Fritsch, Quark: i mattoni del mondo	Boringhieri, Torino 1983
XV	1985	Giorgio Bignami; Marina Frontali; Luciano Terrenato; Valerio Giardini; Enrico Alleva	S. Rose, R. Lewontin, L. Kamin, Il gene e la sua mente	Mondadori, Milano 1984
XVI	1986	Alessandro Passi	G. de Santillana, H. von Dechend, Il mulino di Amleto	Adelphi, Milano 1983
XVII	1987	Dino Ferreri	M. Edelson, Ipotesi e prova in psicoanalisi	Astrolabio, Roma 1986
XVIII	1988	Alfredo Marini	W. Dilthey, Per la fondazione delle scienze dello spirito	F. Angeli, Milano 1985
XIX	1989	Marco Guani	K. Von Fritz, Le origini della scienza in Grecia	Il Mulino, Bologna 1988
XX	1990	Luciana Percovich	N. Mitchinson, Diario di una astronauta	La Tartaruga Blu, Milano 1988
XXI	1991	Giuseppe Longo	M. Minsky, La società della mente	Adelphi, Milano 1989
XXII	1992	Maurizio Negri	Prospettive cosmiche, a cura di S.K. Biswas [e altri]	Muzzio, Padova 1991
XXIII	1993	Maria Teresa Musacchio	C. Ponting, Storia verde del mondo	S.E.I., Torino 1992
XXIV	1994	Non assegnato	Targa premio "alla carriera" (in memoria del Prof. Giampietro Dalla Barba, da poco scomparso), assegnata a Libero Sosio (già vincitore nel 1980).	
XXV	1995	David Mezzacapa	A. Hodges, Storia di un enigma. Vita di Alan Turing	Bollati Boringhieri, Torino 1991
XXVI	1996	Lauro Colasanti	D.C. Dennett, Coscienza	Rizzoli, Milano 1993
XXVII	1997	Federico De Alfaro	J. A. Wheeler, Gravità e spazio	Zanichelli, Bologna 1993.
XXVIII	1998	Maria Rosaria Fasanelli	J. W. McAllister, Bellezza e rivoluzione nella scienza	McGraw-Hill, Milano 1998
XXIX	1999	Maria Gherardelli	Serge Lang, La bellezza della matematica	Bollati Boringhieri, Torino 1997
XXX	2000	Simonetta Frediani	D. C. Dennett, L'idea pericolosa di Darwin. L'evoluzione e i significati della vita	Bollati Boringhieri, Torino 1997
XXXI	2001	Pier Daniele Napolitani	Martin Rees, Prima dell'inizio. Il nostro universo e gli altri L. Smolin, La vita nel Cosmo	Raffaello Cortina, Milano 1998; Einaudi, Torino 1998
XXXII	2002	Silvio Ferraresi	G. M. Edelman e G. Tonioni, Un universo di coscienza. Come la materia diventa immaginazione	Einaudi, Torino 2000
XXXIII	2003	Maresa Vallone	K. Alder, La misura di tutte le cose. L'avventurosa storia dell'invenzione del sistema metrico decimale	Rizzoli, Milano 2002
XXXIV	2004	Alessandro Serra	J. Changeux, L'uomo di verità	Feltrinelli, Milano 2002
XXXV	2005	Francesco Nicodemi	J. D. Barrow – F.J. Tipler, Il principio antropico	Adelphi, Milano 2002
XXXVI	2006	Emilio Diana	R. Penrose, La strada che porta alla realtà	Rizzoli, Milano 2005
XXXVII	2007	Stefano Bianchi	H. C. Baeyer, Informazione. Il nuovo linguaggio della scienza	Edizioni Dedalo, Bari 2005
XXXVIII	2008	Andrea Migliori	N. T. Greenspan, La fine di ogni certezza. La vita e la scienza di Max Born	Codice Edizioni, Torino 2007
XXXIX	2009	Giorgio Panini	Stuart Clark, Il racconto dell'Astronomia moderna	Saggi Einaudi, Torino 2008
XL	2010	Piero Arlorio	John R. NcNeill, Qualcosa di nuovo sotto il sole. Storia dell'ambiente nel XX secolo.	Einaudi, 2002
XLI	2011	Giorgio Panini	Frank Close, Antimateria,	Einaudi, 2010
XLII	2012	Susanna Bourlot	Daniel J. Levitin, Fatti di musica.	Codice Edizioni, 2008

== "Leone Traverso" First Work Prize ==
Ed.	Year	Recipient	Translated work	Publisher
III	1973	Marco Cugno	T. Arghezi, Accordi di parole, poesie 1927–1967	Einaudi, Torino 1972
IV	1974	Laura Mancinelli	I Nibelunghi	Torino, Einaudi, 1972
V	1975	Gian Piero Bona	A. Rimbaud, Poesie	Torino, Einaudi, 1972
VI	1976	Carlo Vittorio Cattaneo	J. de Sena, Esorcismi; E. De Andrade, Ostinato rigore AA.VV., La nuova poesia portoghese	Milano, Accademia, 1974; Roma, Abete, 1975; Roma, Abete, 1975
VII	1977	Silvia Bortoli	Alban Berg, Lettere alla moglie	Milano, Feltrinelli, 1976
VIII	1978	Franca Minuzzo Bacchiega	R. Jeffers, Cawdor	Torino, Einaudi, 1977
IX	1979	Massimo Peri	T. Anghelopulos, La recita	Roma, Editori Riuniti 1977
X	1980	Alessandro Passi	Aśvaghoṣa, Le gesta del Buddha	Milano, Adelphi, 1979
XI	1981	Camillo Negro	Vangelo di Pietro secondo Marco	Fossalta di Piave, Rebellato, 1980
XII	1982	Riccardo Zipoli	Kay Ka'us ibn Iskandar, Il libro dei consigli	Milano, Adelphi, 1981
XIII	1983	Luciana Bianciardi	J. Kennedy Toole, Una congrega di fissati	Milano, Rizzoli, 1982
XIV	1984	Danilo Manera	J. Radićkov, I racconti di Čerkazki	Genova, Marietti 1983
XV	1985	Stefano Manferlotti	C. Dickens, Il mistero di Edwin Drood	Napoli, Guida, 1983
XVI	1986	Guido Davico Bonino	P. Corneille, Il Cid	Pordenone, Studio Tesi, 1985
XVII	1987	Caterina Ricciardi	Poesia canadese del Novecento in lingua inglese	Napoli, Liguori, 1986
XVIII	1988	Paolo Collo	J.M. Eça de Queirós, Il Mandarino – La Buonanima	Torino, Einaudi, 1988
XIX	1989	Olga Visentini	H. Berlioz, Memorie	Pordenone, Studio Tesi, 1989
XX	1990	Giuliano Pisani	Plutarco, Moralia	Biblioteca dell'Immagine; Pordenone, 1989
XXI	1991	Maria Teresa Granata	Farīd al-Dīn ʿAṭṭār, Il poema celeste	Milano, Rizzoli, 1990
XXII	1992	Bruna Dell'Agnese	E. Barrett Browning, Sonetti dal portoghese	Montebelluna, Amadeus, 1991
XXIII	1993	Fernando Bandini	Orazio, Il libro degli epodi	Venezia, Marsilio, 1992
XXIV	1994	Paola Ranzini	C. Goldoni, Memorie	Milano, Mondadori, 1993
XXV	1995	Sara Barni	F. MAYRÖCKER, Viaggio attraverso la notte	Palermo, Sellerio 1994
XXVI	1996	Piero Falchetta	G. Perec, La scomparsa	Napoli, Guida, 1995
XXVII	1997	Andrea Fassò	La canzone di Guglielmo	Parma, Pratiche Editrice, 1995
XXVIII	1998	Giampaolo Tonini	Poeti brasiliani contemporanei	Centro Internazionale della Grafica; Venezia, 1997
XXIX	1999	Andrea Rodighiero	Sofocle, Edipo a Colono	Venezia, Marsilio, 1998
XXX	2000	Cristina Noacco	Chrétien de Troyes, Erec e Enide	Milano-Trento, Luni 1999
XXXI	2001	Annalisa Comes	M. Cvetaeva, Il ragazzo	Firenze, Le Lettere, 2000
XXXII	2002	Veronica Orazi	SENDEBAR, Il libro degli inganni delle donne	Alessandria, Edizioni dell'Orso, 2001
XXXIII	2003	Elettra Bordino Zorzi; Andrea Ceccherelli	A. Farhoud, La felicità scivola tra le dita C. Milosz, Il cagnolino lungo la strada	Roma, Edizioni Sinnos, 2002; Milano, Adelphi 2002
XXXIV	2004	Filippo Maria Pontani	Emmanouil Roidis, La papessa Giovanna	Milano, Crocetti Editore, 2003
XXXV	2005	Sara Sollors	L. Frank Baum, Il Mago di Oz	Venezia, Marsilio, 2004
XXXVI	2006	Laura Naldini; Virginaclara Caporali	F. Pessoa, Le poesie di Ricardo Reis	Firenze-Antella, Passigli Editore, 2005
XXXVII	2007	Francesco Fava	O. Paz, Pietra di sole	Roma, Il Filo 2006
XXXVIII	2008	Jelena Reinhardt	Hugo von Hofmannsthal	Morlacchi, 2007
XXXIX	2009	Dan Petraga; Zeno Verlato	Antologia delle poesie d'Amore dei Trovatori Provenzali	Salerno, Diamanti
XL	2010	non-assegnato	Premio speciale Banca di credito cooperativo di Sant'Elena: Alessandro Gallenzi (Alexander Pope, Il ratto del ricciolo)	Adelphi, 2009;
XLI	2011	Silvia Rogai	Luis Vélez de Guevara, La montanara della Vera	Firenze, Alinea 2010
XLII	2012	Ornella Tajani	Jean Cocteau, L'aquila a due teste	Marchese 2011

== International Prize "Diego Valeri" ==
Ed.	Year	Recipient	Translated work	Publisher
IX	1979	Dolf Verspoor	Traduzioni in neerlandese di testi del teatro italiano	
X	1980	Evgenij M. Solonovič	Traduzioni in lingua russa: U. Saba, Canzoniere; E. Montale, Antologia	Mosca, 1974; Mosca, 1979
XI	1981	Margarita Dalmati	Traduzione in lingua greca E. Montale, Mottetti e altre poesie	Atene, Istituto Italiano di Cultura, 1971
XII	1982	Hallina Kralowa	Traduzione in lingua polacca C.E. Gadda, Accoppiamenti giudiziosi id., La cognizione del dolore	Warszawa, P.I.W. 1974; Warszawa, P.I.W.,1980
XIII	1983	Alice Vollenweider	Traduzioni in lingua tedesca: G. Leopardi, Operette morali, Canti	Monaco, Winkler, 1978
XIV	1984	Ingvar Björkeson	Traduzione in lingua svedese D. Alighieri, La Divina Commedia	Stockholm, Natur och Kultur, 1983
XV	1985	Non assegnato		
XVI	1986	J.H. Klinkert-Potters; Heinz Riedt	Per la traduzione in neerlandese e in tedesco di Pinocchio di Collodi	
XVII	1987	André Boussy	Per la traduzione in francese del teatro di Pirandello	
XVIII	1988	William Weaver	Per le traduzioni in inglese da Primo Levi e Italo Calvino	
XIX	1989	Maria Ragni Gschwend	Per le traduzioni in tedesco da Italo Svevo	
XX	1990	Claude Ambroise	Traduzione in francese L. Sciascia, 1912 +1 e Portes ouvertes	Paris, Fayard, 1988 – 1989
XXI	1991	Jean Michel Gardair	T. Tasso, La Jérusalem délivrée	Paris, Bordas, 1990
XXII	1992	Non assegnato		
XXIII	1993	Ginette Herry	Per le traduzioni in francese da Goldoni	
XXIV	1994	Joaquín Jordá	Traduzioni in lingua spagnola: C. Magris, El Danubio; G. Bufalino, Diceria dell'untore G. Manganelli, Agli dei ulteriori	Barcellona, Anagrama; 1994 – 1989 – 1985
XXV	1995	José Colaço Barreios	Traduzione in lingua portoghese I. Calvino, As cidades invisìveis	Lisbona, Editorial Torema, 1990
XXVI	1996	Jean-Noël Schifano	Traduzione in lingua francese E. Morante, Il mondo salvato dai ragazzini	Paris, Gallimard, 1991
XXVII	1997	Marian Papahagi	Traduzione in lingua rumena E. Montale, Poezii	Cluj-Napoca, Dacia, 1988
XXVIII	1998	María de Las Nieves Muñiz	Traduzione in lingua castigliana dei Canti di Leopardi	Cátedra, Madrid
XXIX	1999	Gérard Luciani	Traduzione in lingua francese N. Machiavelli, Le Prince	Parigi, Gallimard, 1995
XXX	2000	J. Gordon Nichols	Traduzione in lingua inglese F. Petrarca, Canzoniere	Manchester, Carcanet, 2000
XXXI	2001	Michel Orcel	Traduzione in lingua francese L. Ariosto, Roland Furieux	Paris, Seuil, 2000
XXXII	2002	Charles Jerigan; Irene Marchegiani	Per la traduzione in lingua inglese del dramma di T. Tasso, Aminta	New York, Italica Press, 2000
XXXIII	2003	Faradeh Mahdavi-Damghani	Per la traduzione in lingua persiana dell'opera di Dante Alighieri Divina Commedia	Teheran, Tir, 2000
XXXIV	2004	Vasco Graça Moura	Per la traduzione in lingua portoghese di poesie di F. Petrarca As Rimas de Petrarca	Lisbona, Bertrand editora, 2003
XXXV	2005	José Maria Micó	Per la traduzione in lingua spagnola dell'opera di L. Ariosto Orlando Furioso	Madrid, Editorial Espasa, 2005
XXXVI	2006	Mladen Machiedo	Per la traduzione in lingua croata di opere di poeti italiani del Novecento: Zrakasti subjekt (= Soggetto irradiante)	Zagreb, Ceres, 2003
XXXVII	2007	María Hernández Esteban	Traduzione in lingua spagnola del Decameron di Boccaccio	Madrid, Cátedra 2007
XXXVIII	2008	Yond Boeke – Patty Krone	Traduzione in lingua olandese de I promessi sposi di A. Manzoni	Amsterdam, Athenaeum, Polak & van Gennep, 2004
XXXIX	2009	Daniela Maximovic	Traduzione in lingua serba della Lettera a Cristina di Lorena di Galileo	
XL	2010	Gabriela Lungu	Traduzione in lingua rumena di La lunga vita di Marianna Ucrìa di Dacia Maraini.	Bucarest, Univers, 2000
XLI	2011	Barbara Kleiner	Traduzione in lingua tedesca di Bekenntnisse eines Italieners (Le confessioni di un italiano) di Ippolito Nievo	Zurigo, Manesse Verlag, 2005
XLII	2012	Patricia Orts	Traduzione in lingua spagnola di Dios no quiere a los niños e Cuando dios bailaba el tango, di Laura Pariani	Valencia, Pre-textos
