= Massimo Bacigalupo =

Italian filmmaker, scholar and writer (born 1947)

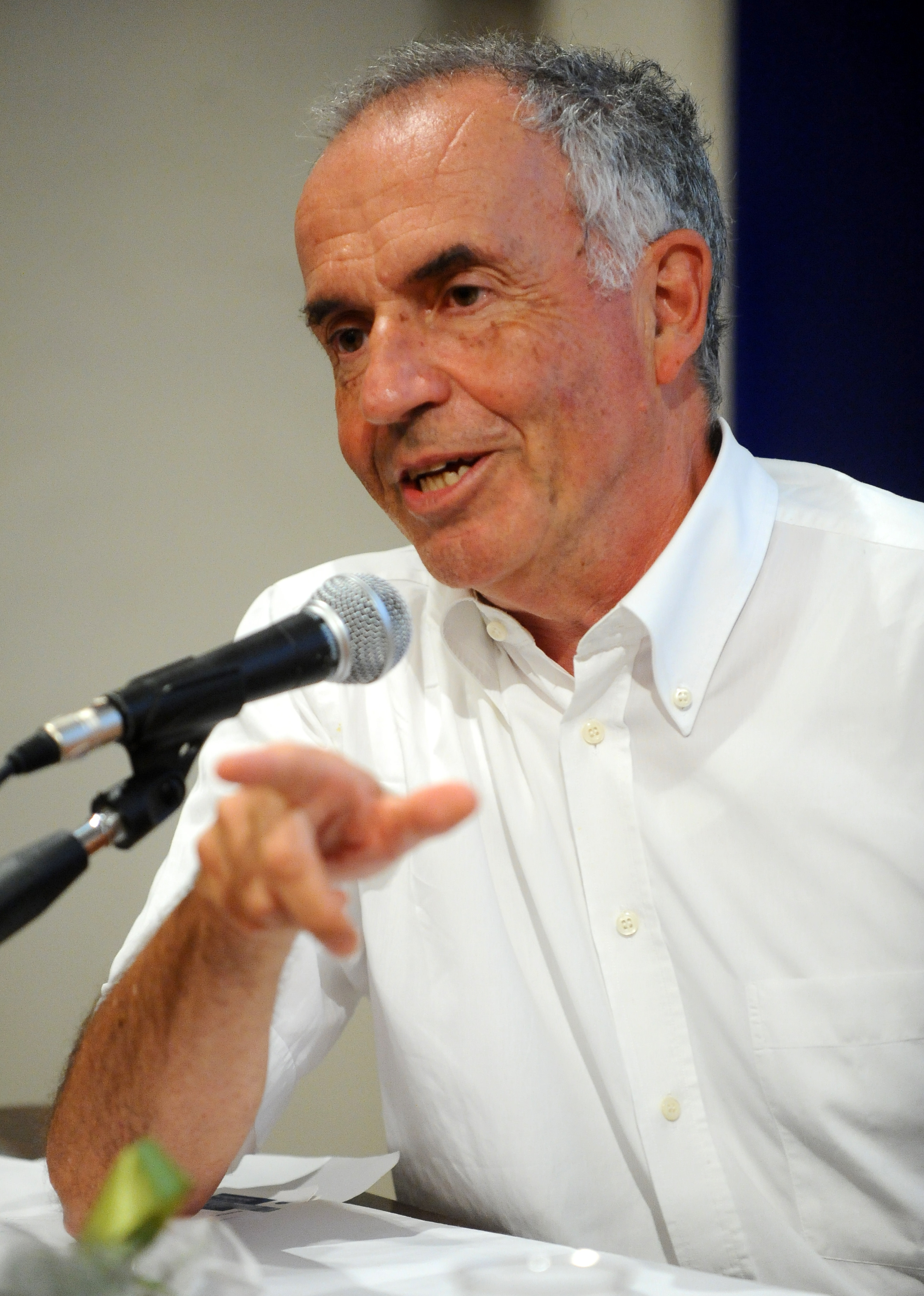
Massimo Bacigalupo

Massimo Bacigalupo (born 1947 in Rapallo, Italy) is an experimental filmmaker, scholar, and translator of poetry, essayist and literary critic. He was a founding member of the Cooperative of Independent Filmmakers in Rome. As a filmmaker of the Italian Independent Cinema (Cinema Indipendente Italiano), he was influenced by the New American Cinema.

Bacigalupo is also a scholar, specializing in Ezra Pound, T. S. Eliot, Wallace Stevens, W. B. Yeats, Seamus Heaney, Herman Melville, Emily Dickinson, and other American, English and Irish writers, whom he has edited and translated. From 1990 to 2007 he was Professor of American Literature at the University of Genoa. He is a member of the Ligurian Academy of Sciences and Letters, Genoa.

== Biography ==
Bacigalupo grew up in Rapallo, the son of Giuseppe Bacigalupo and Frieda Bacigalupo (née Natali). His parents’ house was a centre of cultural life in Rapallo. Writers, poets and composers like Robert Lowell, Czeslaw Milosz, Ezra Pound, and Isaiah Berlin met there.

Giuseppe Bacigalupo was Pound's doctor. Massimo Bacigalupo often encountered Ezra Pound as an adolescent and young man. Knowing Pound at a young age furthered his contacts and later literary exchange with Guy Davenport, Eva Hesse, Olga Rudge, Dorothy Shakespear, Pound’s daughter Mary de Rachewiltz, Donald Davie, James Laughlin and others.

== Work ==
=== Poetry ===
In Genoa, Bacigalupo helped to initiate the International Poetry Festival in the late 1970s when this event was known as "Poetry in public" (Poesia in pubblico). At the time, Bacigalupo motivated poets Denise Levertov and Adrian Mitchell to come to Genoa, . Bacigalupo is still involved in the Genoa poetry festival.

=== Film ===
Bacigalupo was a founding member of the Cooperative of Independent Filmmakers in Rome. As a filmmaker of the Italian Independent Cinema (Cinema Indipendente Italiano), he was influenced by the New American Cinema. His films have been screened and acquired by the Beaubourg Museum, Paris; the Tate Gallery, London; the Cinémathèque Nationale du Belgique; the Vienna Filmmuseum; the Cineteca Nazionale, Rome, Italy; Anthology Film Archives, New York; Marlborough Gallery, London, and the Kunsthalle Düsseldorf.

He made his debut in short films with the 1966 Quasi una tangente, which received first prize at the Festival of Montecatini. There followed a series of short films, such as 60 metri per il 31 marzo (1968), The last summer (1969), Migrazione (1970). In these films, experimentation with a stream of consciousness approach gave rise to visual phantasmagoria, sometimes inspired by travels and encounters with other cultures (such as the Afghan and Indian or the North American).

Bacigalupo was also actively involved in a so-called "little mag" (Touch, published in Philadelphia, PA and Bochum, Germany). As co-editor of this magazine, Steven Diamant convinced Stan Brakhage, P. Adams Sitney, Ken Kelman, Bob Lamberton, and George Stanley that they should contribute poems or articles about film, which they did. Bacigalupo contributed a statement, "Toward Film," and motivated a number of Italian underground filmmakers to contribute texts.

In 1970, Bacigalupo translated a programmatic statement of Brakhage, Metaphors of vision into Italian. It was an effort that made the importance he attached to the work of this filmmaker apparent. In 1969, Bacigalupo participated in the 1st European Meeting of Independent Filmmakers in Munich, together with Peter Kubelka, Kurt Kren, Valie Export, Gregory Markopoulos, the Heins, Werner Nekes and Dore O.

In addition to creating numerous films, Bacigalupo wrote pieces of film criticism on the underground cinema for such magazines as Filmcritica, Bianco & Nero, and the New York-based journal Film Culture.

In 1973-75 Bacigalupo lived in New York. It was here that he completed the short film Warming Up, which was shown immediately after its completion at the Anthology Film Archives directed by Jonas Mekas. He also shot another short film, Postcard from America (Cartoline dall'America).

After 1975, Massimo Bacigalupo produced numerous videos documenting aspects of the work and life of various artist friends. In 2010, the 28th Turin Film Festival dedicated a retrospective to him and his work. Simultaneously, the Modern Art Museum of Turin, GAM, hosted the exhibition "Apparitions: Images and Texts from the Archive of Massimo Bacigalupo." In 2004 Paolo Brunatto, an experimental filmmaker, included Bacigalupo in a series of twelve portraits for television of fellow film artists, Schegge di Utopia.

=== Criticism and scholarship ===
In the 1970s in New York City, he met poets like Barbara Guest, Ron Padgett, and Nick Piombino. He also pursued advanced studies at Columbia University in New York, writing a Ph.D. thesis about the post-war Cantos of Ezra Pound.

While still involved in the arts, Bacigalupo is also engaged in a series of studies and translations of American and British authors. For many years, he has concentrated on the work of Ezra Pound, and has also written about other poets, including Marianne Moore, Wallace Stevens, William Butler Yeats, Emily Dickinson, Herman Melville, Seamus Heaney, and Louise Glück.

His critical works include L'ultimo Pound, 1981, and Grotta Byron, 2001. He has also been the editor of Italian editions of the works of major modern poets and a translator. In 1992, he won the Premio Monselice, a prize for literary translations, for his rendition of The Prelude by William Wordsworth. In 2001, Bacigalupo received the Premio Nazionale di Traduzione (National Translation Award).

As a Professor of American Literature and professor of the theory and practice of translation at the Department of Modern Languages and Cultures of the University of Genoa, Bacigalupo has been involved in the International Poetry Festival in Genoa. Starting in 2006, he organised the yearly Bloomsday event for the International Genoa Poetry Festival "Parole Spalancate".

== Filmography and bibliography ==
=== Selected filmography ===
- Quasi una tangente (1966)
- 200 Feet for March 31 (1968)
- Her (1968)
- Versus (1968)
- The Last Summer (1969)
- Migrazione (1970)
- Coda (1970)
- Warming Up (1973)
- Postcards from America (1975)
- Into the House (1975)
- Ricercar 1973-2020 (2020)

=== Videos ===
- Gregory Markopoulos and Robert Beavers in 1987 (1987)
- Micky Wolfson in Action (1987)
- Don Perrygrove Enjoys the Italian Riviera (1987)
- Guido Fink and Friends (1988)
- Sheri Martinelli in 1988 (1988)

=== Selected publications ===
- Bloomsdays. In cammino con Joyce & company. Ostuni, BR (Calamospecchia edizioni) 2023.
- Ezra Pound, Italy and The Cantos. Clemson, SC (Clemson University Press) 2020.
- Angloliguria: Da Byron a Hemingway. Genoa (Il Canneto) 2017.
- Tutte le poesie by Wallace Stevens. Ed. and translated by Massimo Bacigalupo. Milan (Mondadori) 2015.
- Posthumous Cantos by Ezra Pound. Ed. by Massimo Bacigalupo. Manchester (Carcanet) 2015.
- The Politics and Poetics of Displacement: Modernism off the Beaten Track. Ed. by Massimo Bacigalupo and Luisa Villa, Udine (Campanotto) 2011.
- Tigullio Itineraries: Ezra Pound and Friends. Genova (Università degli studi di Genova) 2008.
- Critica del Novecento / Criticizing the Twentieth Century. Ed. by Massimo Bacigalupo and Anna Lucia Giavotto, Genova (Tilgher) 2001.
- Modernità dei romantici. By M. Bacigalupo et al.; ed. by Lilla Maria Crisafulli Jones et al., Napoli (Liguori) 1988.
- Life is ecstasy: a Transcendentalist Theme in Whitman, Pound, and other American poets. Nice (Université de Nice) 1987.
- Ezra Pound, un poeta a Rapallo. Genoa (Edizioni S. Marco dei Giustiniani) 1985.
- L'ultimo Pound. Roma (Edizioni di storia e letteratura) 1981.
- The Forméd Trace: The Later Poetry of Ezra Pound. New York (Columbia Univ. Press) 1980.
- Many contributions in journals such as Clio, English Studies in Africa, L'Indice dei libri del mese, Journal of Modern Literature, Modern Language Review, Notes and Queries (Oxford U.P.), Paideuma, Paragone, South Atlantic Quarterly, Yale Review, Yearbook of English Studies.
