= NGC 3516 =

Galaxy in the constellation of Ursa Major

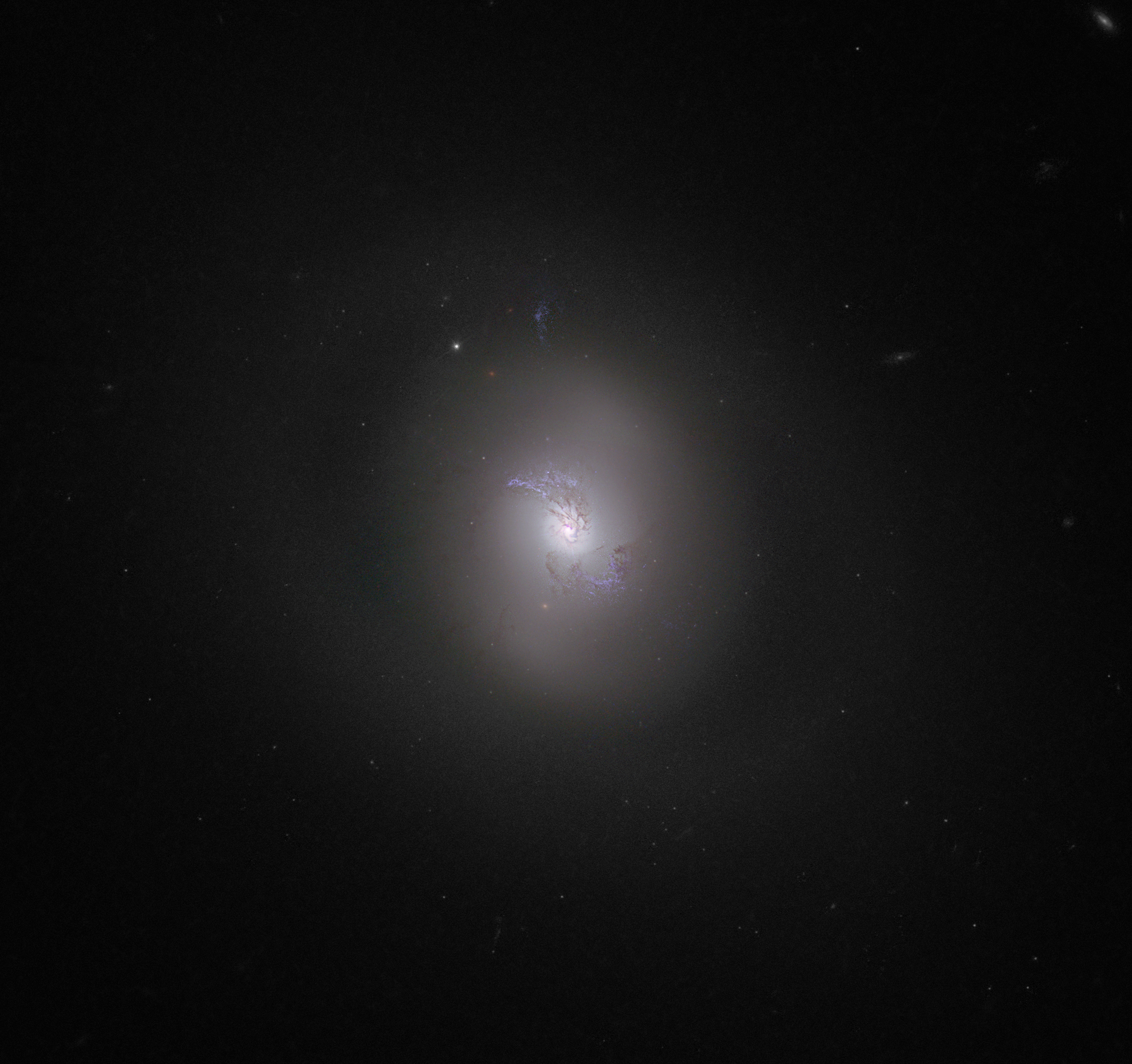
- NGC 3516 by Hubble Space Telescope

Observation data (J2000 epoch)
- Constellation: Ursa Major
- Right ascension: 11^{h} 06^{m} 47.5^{s}
- Declination: +72° 34′ 07″
- Redshift: 0.008836 ± 0.000023
- Heliocentric radial velocity: 2649 ± 7 km/s
- Distance: 165 ± 50 Mly (51.5 ± 15.1 Mpc)
- Apparent magnitude (V): 11.5

Characteristics
- Type: (R)SB(s)0^0^
- Apparent size (V): 1.7′ × 1.3′
- Notable features: Seyfert galaxy

Other designations
- UGC 6153, MCG +12-11-009, PGC 33623

NGC 3516 is a barred lenticular galaxy in the constellation of Ursa Major. NGC 3516 is located about 150 million light years away from Earth, which means, given its apparent dimensions, that NGC 3516 is approximately 100,000 light years across. It was discovered by William Herschel on April 3, 1785.

== Characteristics ==
In 1943, this galaxy was one of six nebulae listed by American astronomer Carl Keenan Seyfert that showed broad emission lines in their nuclei. Members of this class of objects became known as Seyfert galaxies, and they were noted to have a higher than normal surface brightness in their nuclei. NGC 3516 is believed to host a supermassive black hole whose mass is estimated to be (4.27±1.46)×10^{7} M_{☉} based on broad emission-line reverberation mapping or 23000000 M_{☉} as measured based on velocity dispersion.

Due to its high brightness in both UV and X-rays, and its prominent and clear active galactic nucleus absorption features, it has been an ideal laboratory for studying the AGN warm-absorber outflows with high-resolution spectroscopy. Over the past few decades, there have been many UV and X-ray case studies of the ionized outflows in NGC 3516. NGC 3516 has been a remarkably variable AGN, showing changes in both the intrinsic continuum and the intrinsic absorption by the ionized outflows. In 2014, the broad lines almost disappeared, probably becoming obstructed, and thus the galaxy has been identified as a changing-look AGN, meaning it changed spectra between type 1 and type 2 AGN.

The galaxy has been found to emit radiowaves, with the source extending towards the north for about 0.65 arcseconds. That structure is a bit curved and probably is related to the gaseous outflow. A spiral dust feature measuring 3 arcseconds in diameter is visible north of the nucleus. A blue filamentary feature is visible northeast of the nucleus and another blue feature is visible 1.5 arcseconds southwest of the nucleus.

== Nearby galaxies ==
NGC 3516 is a relatively isolated galaxy. Near galaxies include NGC 3147 with its group that NGC 3155, UGC 5570, UGC 5686, and UGC 5689, NGC 3183, NGC 3348, and NGC 3364. Garcia identified NGC 3516 as a member of group that also includes the galaxies NGC 3348, and NGC 3364.
