= Stephen P. Laurie =

British astronomer

Asteroids discovered: 50
| 7603 Salopia | 25 July 1995 |
| 9421 Violilla | 24 December 1995 |
| 9428 Angelalouise | 26 February 1996 |
| (10212) 1997 RA7 | 3 September 1997 |
| 10216 Popastro | 22 September 1997 |
| (10383) 1996 SR7 | 16 September 1996 |
| (11601) 1995 SE4 | 28 September 1995 |
| 11626 Church Stretton | 8 November 1996 |
| (12785) 1995 ST | 19 September 1995 |
| (12786) 1995 SU | 19 September 1995 |
| (13152) 1995 QK | 19 August 1995 |
| (13687) 1997 RB7 | 7 September 1997 |
| (16753) 1996 QS1 | 21 August 1996 |
| (16771) 1996 UQ3 | 19 October 1996 |
| (17660) 1996 VP6 | 7 November 1996 |
| (20199) 1997 DR | 28 February 1997 |
| (21281) 1996 TX14 | 13 October 1996 |
| (22431) 1996 DY2 | 28 February 1996 |
| (24828) 1995 SE1 | 20 September 1995 |
| (26972) 1997 SM3 | 21 September 1997 |
| (26981) 1997 UJ15 | 25 October 1997 |
| (27902) 1996 RA5 | 13 September 1996 |
| (27908) 1996 TX9 | 4 October 1996 |
| (28015) 1997 YG9 | 26 December 1997 |
| (31144) 1997 TM26 | 7 October 1997 |
| (32930) 1995 SC4 | 24 September 1995 |
| (37733) 1996 UD1 | 16 October 1996 |
| (39663) 1995 WM1 | 16 November 1995 |
| (39676) 1996 DQ1 | 20 February 1996 |
| (39749) 1997 BW6 | 28 January 1997 |
| (46690) 1997 AN23 | 14 January 1997 |
| (48625) 1995 QF | 16 August 1995 |
| (48632) 1995 SV29 | 29 September 1995 |
| (55825) 1995 SD4 | 27 September 1995 |
| (55839) 1996 LH1 | 13 June 1996 |
| (55846) 1996 RJ5 | 15 September 1996 |
| (58367) 1995 QL | 19 August 1995 |
| (58403) 1995 WL1 | 16 November 1995 |
| (58425) 1996 DR1 | 20 February 1996 |
| (73818) 1995 WP1 | 17 November 1995 |
| (73951) 1997 UK8 | 21 October 1997 |
| (85369) 1996 DX2 | 26 February 1996 |
| (90863) 1996 QR1 | 17 August 1996 |
| (100323) 1995 OY1 | 22 July 1995 |
| (100447) 1996 RB5 | 14 September 1996 |
| (100458) 1996 TP3 | 4 October 1996 |
| (129503) 1995 OZ1 | 24 July 1995 |
| (129542) 1996 RK5 | 15 September 1996 |
| (157813) 1995 WN1 | 16 November 1995 |
| (160526) 1996 RZ4 | 13 September 1996 |

Stephen P. Laurie is a British amateur astronomer. He is a prolific discoverer of asteroids and comets, although his profession is that of an actuary. He has also worked on searches for dwarf stars, and discovered supernova SN 1997bq in NGC 3147, on 7 April 1997.

Laurie has named five asteroids he discovered from the Church Stretton area — 7603 Salopia (named after Shropshire), 9421 Violilla, 9428 Angelalouise, 10216 Popastro and 11626 Church Stretton — all discovered at observatory 966 Church Stretton and nearby location Ragdon (observatory J17). Laurie lives and works in the Church Stretton area.
