= SN 2021hpr =

Supernova from a binary star system

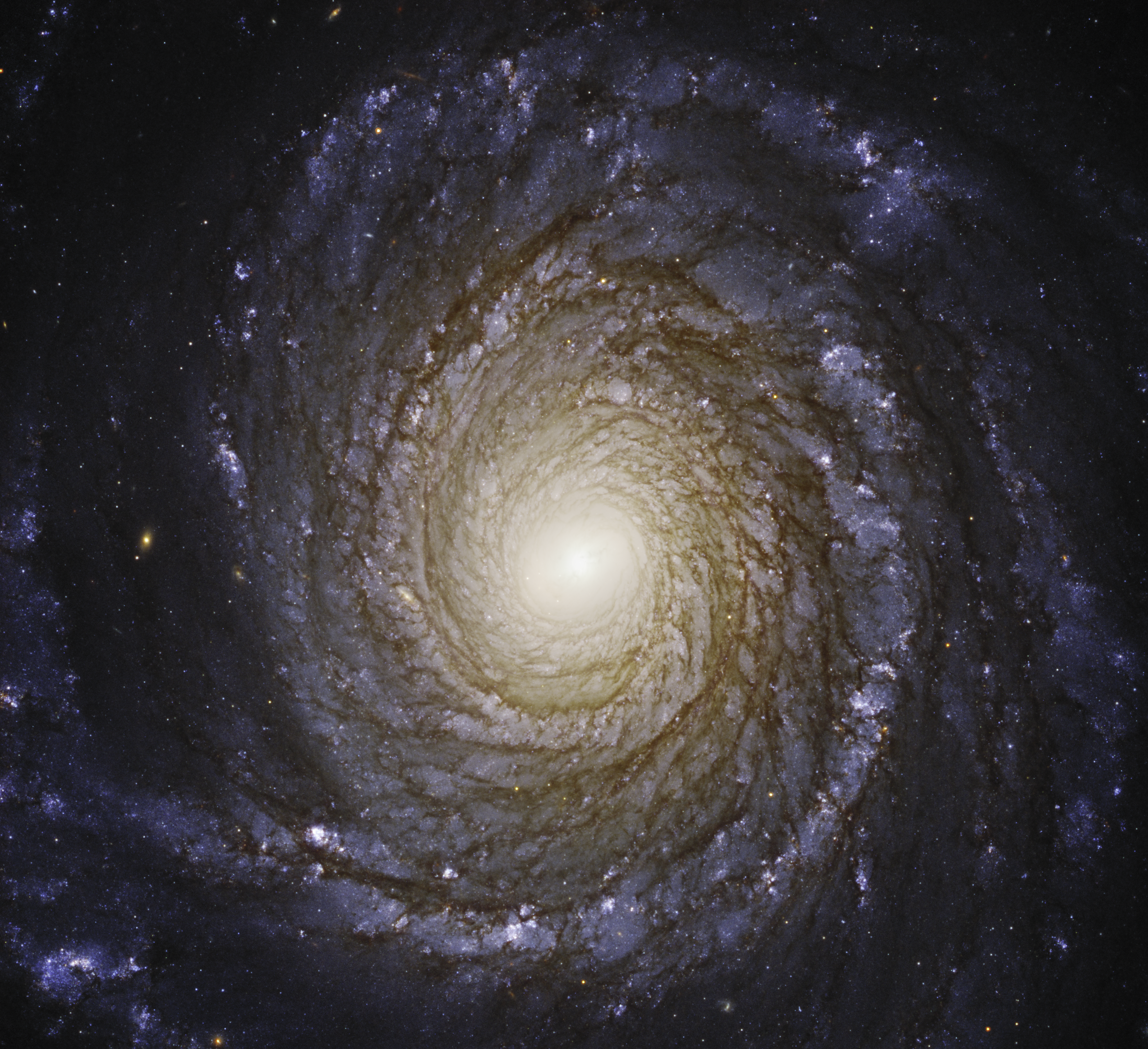
- NGC 3147 is the host galaxy
- Event type: Ia supernova
- Discovered: 2 April 2021
- Constellation: Draco
- Right ascension: 10^{h} 16^{m} 38.620^{s}
- Declination: +73° 24′ 01.80″
- Epoch: J2000
- Distance: 147 million ly
- Host: NGC 3147
- Progenitor: Binary star
- Peak apparent magnitude: 13.8

SN 2021hpr was a Type Ia supernova located in the Constellation of Draco that occurred in the spiral galaxy NGC 3147 at a distance of around 147 million light years (45 Mpc). Its discovery was reported by amateur astronomer Kōichi Itagaki on 2 April 2021. The progenitor of this supernova was likely a star in a binary star system with a separation of around 15.84 AU.

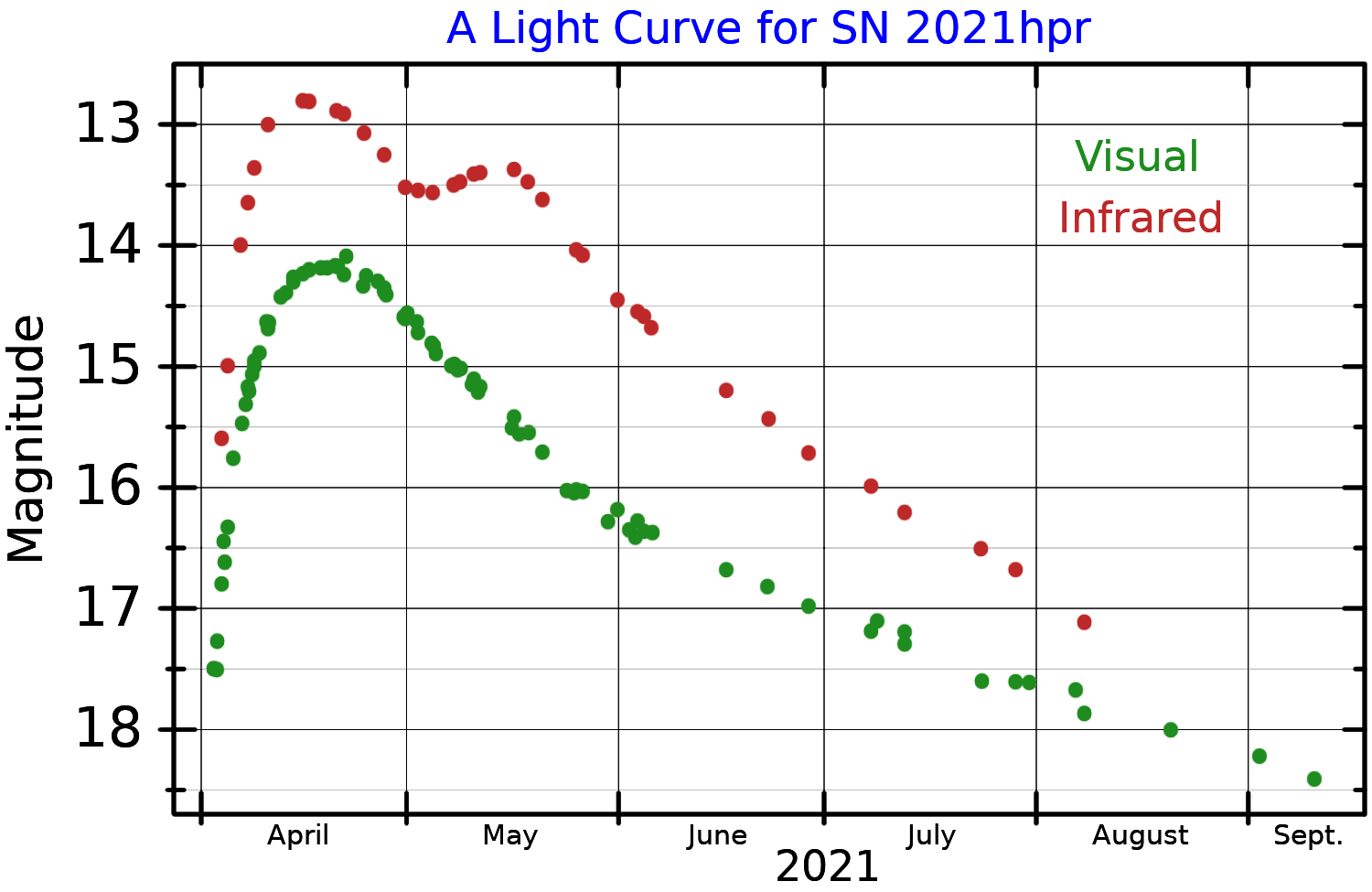
A light curve for SN 2021hpr showing the visual (v band) and near-infrared (i band) brightness, adapted from Barna et al. (2023)

The expanding fireball produced by this supernova was homogeneous. This is likely due to the supernova ejecta interacting with its companion object and the surrounding circumstellar medium (CSM). The circumstellar medium was metal rich.
