= Sandro Penna =

Italian poet

Sandro Penna (12 June 1906 – 21 January 1977) was an Italian poet.

== Biography ==
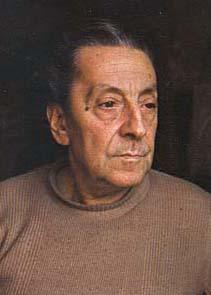
Sandro Penna in 1974

Born in Perugia, Penna lived in Rome for most of his life.

He never had a regular job, contributing to several newspapers and writing almost only poetry. His first poems were published in 1932, through the intervention of Umberto Saba. Openly gay, his works were largely marked by his melancholic view of homosexuality as imagination. Penna's economic conditions were often poor, and in his late years a group of intellectuals signed a manifesto in the newspaper Paese Sera to help him.

His affection for young boys was reflected by the constant presence of young boys in his verses, as well as in his taking a 14-year-old street boy from Rome, Raffaele, to the home he shared with his mother in 1956 and living with him, on and off, for fourteen years.

According to Pier Paolo Pasolini, Penna's poetry was made of "an extremely delicate material of city places, with asphalt and grass, whitewashed walls of poor houses, white marbles of the bridges, and everywhere the sea's breath, the murmur of the river in which the trembling night lights reflect".

His controversial erotic love poems can be found in English translations in This Strange Joy (Ohio State University Press, 1982) and Remember me, God of Love (Carcanet, 1993).

An epigram of Penna's about the dark-skinned, dark-eyed, dark-haired Raffaele, scribbled on the back of his portrait by Tano Festa, reads:

Ho visto il mio moretto
seduto giù in platea
fumava un sigaretto
e gli occhi lustri avea.

Sandro Penna died in Rome in 1977.

== Works ==
- Una strana gioia di vivere (1956)
- Croce e delizia (1958)
- Tutte le poesie (1970)
- Stranezze (1976)
- Confuso sogno (1980, posthumous)
- Confused Dream (1988, New York & Madras: Hanuman Books, a translation by George Scrivani. ISBN 0-937815-15-2)
- Within the Sweet Noise of Life (2021, London, New York & Calcutta: Seagull Books, translation by Alexander Booth. ISBN 0857427873)
