= Soho Press =

New York City-based publisher

- Founded: 1986
- Founder: Laura Hruska, Juris Jurjevics
- Successor: Bronwen Hruska
- Country of origin: United States
- Headquarters location: New York, New York
- Distribution: Penguin Random House Publisher Services
- Publication types: Books
- Fiction genres: Literary fiction, narrative nonfiction and crime
- Imprints: Soho Crime, Soho Teen
- Official website: sohopress.com

Soho Press is a New York City-based publisher founded by Juris Jurjevics and Laura Hruska in 1986 and currently headed by Bronwen Hruska. It specializes in literary fiction and international crime series. Other works include published by it include memoirs. Its Young Adult imprint Soho Teen, which focuses on YA mysteries and thrillers.

Soho Press releases an average of 90 titles per year. Its fiction backlist holds titles from several notable authors, such as National Book Award finalist Edwidge Danticat (Krik? Krak!), Sue Townsend (Adrian Mole: The Lost Years), Maria Thomas (Antonia Saw the Oryx First), Jake Arnott (Long Firm-C), John L'Heureux (The Handmaid of Desire), Delores Phillips, and Jacqueline Winspear, recipient of the Agatha Award.

== Soho Crime ==
Soho Crime is a department of Soho Press that focuses on international crime series. It has produced works from widely read authors like Cara Black, Stuart Neville, Colin Cotterill, Timothy Williams, and Peter Lovesey. Each crime novel or series explores a foreign country or US subculture. Settings have included Paris, Bath, Northern Ireland, Laos, South Korea, Guadeloupe, Japan, Australia, Brazil, Bristol, Madrid, and Berlin.

== Soho Constable ==
Soho Constable was a co-publishing venture with UK publisher Constable & Robinson, through which Soho Press releases British procedural mysteries in the United States. Authors have included Alison Bruce, David Dickinson, Suzette A. Hill, Pat McIntosh, R.T. Raichev, James Craig, and Barbara Cleverly.
