= Alessandro Serpieri (writer) =

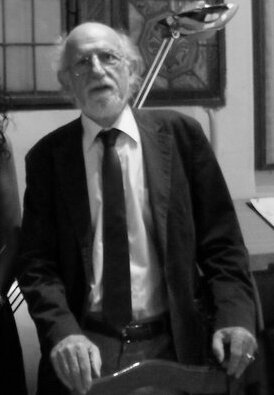
Alessandro Serpieri in Florence

Alessandro Serpieri (Molfetta, 21 January 1935 - Florence, 6 February 2017) was an Italian Anglicist and translator.

== Biography ==
Alessandro Serpieri was born in Molfetta in 1935. He became full assistant of English language and literature at the University of Bologna in 1963; he held the position until 1968. In 1971 he became full professor at the University of Florence, where, years later, was appointed as emeritus professor. From 1979 to 1983 he was president of the Italian Association of Semiotic Studies, and from 1991 to 1993 he presided over the Italian Association of English Studies. He has worked mainly on plays and poetry in English, translating and editing various works by, among others, William Shakespeare, T.S. Eliot and Joseph Conrad. In 1977 he published a novel, entitled Mostri agli Alisei, and in 1988 the play, Dracula. In 1992 he won the Mondello Prize for the translation of William Shakespeare's Sonnets. For the translation of Shakespeare's The First Hamlet he won the XVIII "Monselice Prize" for literary translation (1998), and still for his work as translator he was awarded with the Grinzane Cavour Prize.

== Works ==
=== Essays ===
- John Webster, Bari, Adriatica, 1966
- Hopkins, Eliot, Auden. Saggi sul parallelismo poetico, Bologna, Patron, 1969
- Arabesco metafisico eliotiano, in "Lingua e stile", a. V, 3, dicembre 1970
- T.S. Eliot, Le strutture profonde, Bologna, Il Mulino, 1973
- Rhapsody. Tre studi su una lirica di T.S. Eliot, Collana Studi, Milano, Bompiani, 1974 (with Marcello Pagnini and Anthony J. Johnson)
- I sonetti dell'immortalità. Il problema dell'arte e della nominazione in Shakespeare, Collana Studi, Milano, Bompiani, 1975; 1998
- Otello: l'Eros negato. Psicoanalisi di una proiezione distruttiva, Milano, Coopli, 1976; Milano, Il formichiere, 1978; Napoli, Liguori, 2003
- Sul concetto di trasformazione e sulla poetica generativa, in Virginia Finzi Ghisi (edited by), Crisi del sapere e nuova razionalità, Bari, De Donato, 1978
- Ipotesi teorica di segmentazione del testo teatrale, in Come comunica il teatro. Dal testo alla scena, Milano, Il formichiere, 1978
- Retorica e immaginario, Parma, Pratiche, 1986
- Mettere in scena Shakespeare, Parma, Pratiche, 1987 (with Keir Elam)
- Nel laboratorio di Shakespeare. Dalle fonti ai drammi, Parma, Pratiche, 1988
  - 1. Il quadro teorico
  - 2. La prima tetralogia (Marcella Quadri, Anna Maria Bernini, Giovanna Mochi)
  - 3. La seconda tetralogia (Susan Payne, Serena Cenni, Aldo Celli)
  - 4. I drammi romani (with Keir Elam and Claudia Corti)
- On the Language of Drama, trans. by Annamaria Carusi, Pretoria, University of South Africa Press, 1989
- Polifonia shakespeariana, Roma, Bulzoni, 2002
- Introduzione a Joseph Conrad, La follia di Almayer, trans. by Marco Papi, Milano, Rizzoli, 2004
- English Renaissance Scenes: From Canon to Margins, Berna, Peter Lang, 2008 (with Paola Pugliatti)

=== Curatorships ===
- Joseph Conrad, Youth, Firenze, Sansoni, 1963
- Joseph Conrad, Epistolario, Milano, Bompiani, 1966
- George Meredith, L'amore moderno, Bari, De Donato, 1968; Milano, Rizzoli, 1999
- William Shakespeare, Amleto, Milano, Feltrinelli, 1980; Venezia, Marsilio, 1997
- T.S. Eliot, La terra desolata, Milano, Rizzoli, 1982; 2010
- Shakespeare: la nostalgia dell'essere, Parma, Pratiche, 1985
- William Shakespeare, Il mercante di Venezia, Milano, Garzanti, 1987
- L'eros in Shakespeare, Parma, Pratiche, 1988 (with Keir Elam)
- William Shakespeare, Tito Andronico, Milano, Garzanti, 1989
- William Shakespeare, Pericle, principe di Tiro, Milano, Garzanti, 1991
- William Shakespeare, Sonetti of Shakespeare, Milano, Rizzoli, 1991
- William Shakespeare, Giulio Cesare by William Shakespeare, Milano, Garzanti, 1993
- Joseph Conrad, L'agente segreto by Conrad: un racconto semplice, Firenze, Giunti, 1994
- Joseph Conrad, Falk, Venezia, Marsilio, 1994; 2002
- William Shakespeare, Macbeth, Firenze, Giunti, 1996
- William Shakespeare, Il primo Amleto, Venezia, Marsilio, 1997
- William Shakespeare, Drammi romanzeschi, Venezia, Marsilio, 2001
- Lewis Carroll, Le avventure di Alice nel Paese delle Meraviglie, Venezia, Marsilio, 2002
- William Shakespeare, Misura per misura, Venezia, Marsilio, 2003
- William Shakespeare, La tempesta, Venezia, Marsilio, 2006
- John Donne, Poesie, Milano, Rizzoli, 2007 (with Silvia Bigliazzi)

=== Novels ===
- Mostri agli elisei, Bompiani, 1977
- Mare scritto, Manni, 2007

=== Theatre ===
- Dracula, Milano, Hystrio, 1988

== Awards ==
- Grinzane Cavour Prize
- Mondello Prize
- Monselice Prize
