= Stefano Bianchi =

Italian astrophysicist

- Known for: Black holes; Active Galactic Nuclei; X-ray Binaries
- Awards: Premio Monselice (2007)
- Scientific career
- Fields: Astrophysics
- Workplaces: Università degli Studi Roma Tre
- Website: Personal website

Stefano Bianchi is an Italian astrophysicist who is currently an associate professor at the Mathematics and Physics Department of Università degli Studi Roma Tre in Rome, Italy. He is an INAF Associate and an IAU Member.

== Education and career ==
Bianchi's research interests include different aspects of high-energy astrophysics, focusing on black holes, Active Galactic Nuclei, and X-ray Binaries. He is a member of the NASA/ASI IXPE Science Team and of the ESA XMM-Newton Users' Group. He is involved in the science definition of the future ESA missions Athena and LISA. He has translated three popular science books into Italian.

== Main awards ==
- Bruno Rossi Prize 2024, as a member of the IXPE Team
- "Città di Monselice" award for Scientific Translation (2007)

== Memberships ==
- European Space Agency XMM-Newton Users' Group (2019–present)
- Review Editor for Frontiers in Astronomy and Space Sciences
- Editorial Board Member for Galaxies
- Member of the IXPE Science Team
- Member of the IAU

== Books and articles ==
Bianchi has translated three popular science books into Italian.

- Hans Christian von Baeyer, Informazione. Il nuovo linguaggio della scienza, traduzione di Stefano Bianchi, collana La Scienza Nuova, edizioni Dedalo, 2005, p. 296, ISBN 978-88-220-0226-6
- Tom Siegfried, L'Universo strano. Idee al confine dello spazio-tempo, traduzione di Stefano Bianchi, collana La Scienza Nuova, edizioni Dedalo, 2007, p. 352, ISBN 978-88-220-0232-7
- Dan Hooper, Il lato oscuro dell'universo. Dove si nascondono energia e materia, traduzione di Stefano Bianchi, collana La Scienza Nuova, edizioni Dedalo, 2008, p. 240, ISBN 978-88-220-0241-9

=== Selected papers ===
- Nicastro, Fabrizio; Zezas, Andreas; Drake, Jeremy; Elvis, Martin; Fiore, Fabrizio; Fruscione, Antonella; Marengo, Massimo; Mathur, Smita; Bianchi, Stefano (2002). "Chandra Discovery of a Tree in the X-Ray Forest toward PKS 2155−304: The Local Filament?". The Astrophysical Journal. 573 (1): 157–167. arXiv:astro-ph/0201058. Bibcode:2002ApJ...573..157N. doi:10.1086/340489. S2CID 17387111.
- Bianchi, S.; Guainazzi, M.; Chiaberge, M. (2006). "The soft X-ray/NLR connection: A single photoionized medium?". Astronomy & Astrophysics. 448 (2): 499–511. arXiv:astro-ph/0511216. Bibcode:2006A&A...448..499B. doi:10.1051/0004-6361:20054091. S2CID 16245074.
- Bianchi, S.; Guainazzi, M.; Matt, G.; Fonseca Bonilla, N.; Ponti, G. (2009). "CAIXA: A catalogue of AGN in the XMM-Newton archive". Astronomy & Astrophysics. 495 (2): 421–430. arXiv:0811.1126. doi:10.1051/0004-6361:200810620. S2CID 5801342.
- Ponti, G.; Papadakis, I.; Bianchi, S.; Guainazzi, M.; Matt, G.; Uttley, P.; Bonilla, N. F. (2012). "CAIXA: A catalogue of AGN in theXMM-Newtonarchive". Astronomy & Astrophysics. 542: A83. arXiv:1112.2744. doi:10.1051/0004-6361/201118326. S2CID 5848848.
- Kaastra, J. S.; et al. (2014). "A fast and long-lived outflow from the supermassive black hole in NGC 5548". Science. 345 (6192): 64–68. arXiv:1406.5007. Bibcode:2014Sci...345...64K. doi:10.1126/science.1253787. PMID 24994647. S2CID 30520552.
