= Sereni =

Sereni is an Italian surname. Notable people with the surname include:

- Clara Sereni (1946–2018), Italian writer
- Emilio Sereni (1907–1977), Italian politician
- Enzo Sereni (1905–1944), Italian Zionist
- Marina Sereni (born 1960), Italian politician
- Mario Sereni (1928–2015), Italian opera singer
- Matteo Sereni (born 1975), Italian footballer
- Vittorio Sereni (1913–1983), Italian poet and writer
