= Orengo =

Orengo is a surname. Notable people with the surname include:

- Christine Orengo (born 1955), British professor of bioinformatics
- Gilbert Orengo (1934–1990), Monegasque fencer
- James Orengo, Kenyan politician
- Joe Orengo (1914–1988), American baseball player
- José Orengo (born 1976), Argentine rugby union footballer and coach
