= Berenson =

Berenson is a surname. Notable people with the surname include:

- Alex Berenson (born 1973), American writer and journalist
- Bernard Berenson (1865–1959), American art historian
- Berry Berenson (1948–2001), American model, actress, and photographer
- Gordon "Red" Berenson (born 1939), Canadian ice hockey player and coach
- Lori Berenson (born 1969), American jailed in Peru for terrorism related crimes
- Marisa Berenson (born 1947), American actress and model
- Senda Berenson Abbott (1868–1954), American basketball player

Fictional characters:

- Jake Berenson, character in the Animorphs series
- Saul Berenson, character in the American political thriller TV series Homeland
