= Craxi =

Craxi (Italian pronunciation: [ˈkraksi] or [ˈkraʃʃi], Sicilian pronunciation: [ˈkɾaʃʃɪ]) is an Italian surname which originated from Sicily. Notable people with the surname include:

- Bettino Craxi (1934–2000), Italian politician
- Bobo Craxi (born 1964), Italian politician, son of Bettino
- Stefania Craxi (born 1960), Italian politician, daughter of Bettino
