= Adelphi Edizioni =

Italian publishing house

Adelphi Edizioni S.p.A.
- Status: Active
- Founded: 1962
- Founder: Luciano Foà, Roberto Bazlen, Alberto Zevi and Roberto Olivetti
- Country of origin: Italy
- Headquarters location: Milan
- Distribution: Italy
- Key people: Teresa Cremisi (president); Roberto Calasso (former president); Roberto Colajanni (CEO)
- Publication types: Books
- Official website: www.adelphi.it

Adelphi Edizioni is a publishing house based in Milan, Italy, that specializes in works of fiction, philosophy, science and classics translated into Italian. It was founded in 1962 by former chief editor of Einaudi Publishing Luciano Foà. Adelphi is focused on non-mainstream, countercultural literature across various genres, ranging from esotericism to fantasy.

== History ==
Adelphi Edizioni S.p.A. was founded in 1962 by Luciano Foà, Roberto Bazlen, Alberto Zevi, and Roberto Olivetti. For more than ten years, Foà worked at Einaudi Publishing, gaining considerable experience and building an extensive network of contacts. At some point, he felt that Einaudi’s style and policies were too limiting, preventing him from publishing books that he personally found interesting. The decision was triggered by Einaudi's refusal to publish the collected works of Nietzsche. Despite the split, Einaudi and Foà remained close friends.

The post-war climate in Italy of that period dictated a very direct approach to publishing, responding to the demands of the emerging middle class, which tended to avoid ambiguity and novelty. While others were primarily publishing established, easy-to-define authors and works, Adelphi emerged as a subversive newcomer to the publishing market, releasing fantasy, Oriental spiritual literature and esotericism, Mitteleuropa studies, forgotten or overlooked classics, etc.

The name of the new house was inspired by the Greek word "adelphi" (ἀδελφοί), which means "brothers" or "companions" and refers to the group who founded the publishing house. For the new publisher's logo, Foà chose an ancient Chinese pictogram for the ‘new moon’, a symbol of death and rebirth.

Among the main collaborators of the new editorial team were Giorgio Colli, Sergio Solmi, Claudio Rugafiori, Franco Volpi, and Giuseppe Pontiggia. Roberto Calasso joined Adelphi in 1962, becoming editorial director in 1971 and president in 1999. When Bazlen and Foà had passed away, he remained the main figure who defined and shaped Adelphi's publishing policy.

In 1963, they launched Classics collection: a selection of unique books, including selected works of Georg Büchner, Fede e bellezza by Niccolò Tommaseo, selected novels by Gottfried Keller. In 1964, Adelphi published Robinson Crusoe by Daniel Defoe. One of their first important publishing endeavours was the publication of a new complete works of Friedrich Nietzsche, edited by Giorgio Colli and Mazzino Montinari, in collaboration with Éditions Gallimard and Walter de Gruyter.

One of the most important and famous collections by Adelphi, Biblioteca Adelphi, was launched in 1965. It was started with Alfred Kubin's The Other Side which was followed by The Manuscript Found in Saragossa by Jan Potocki.

Adelphi has been associated with promoting Mitteleuropean literature from the 1970s onwards and publishing works by contemporary authors that have not yet received recognition elsewhere. Under Calasso, Adelphi published a wide range of Mitteleuropean literature from the 1970s onwards and works by contemporary authors that have not yet received recognition elsewhere, including Joseph Roth, Karl Kraus, Robert Walser, Thomas Bernhard, Danilo Kiš, Milan Kundera.

In 1973, Adelphi launched the series Piccola Biblioteca Adelphi, a series dedicated to short literary works (up to 200 pages), inspired by the Bibliothek Suhrkamp created by Peter Suhrkamp. It was opened with Journey to the East by Hermann Hesse. Adelphi started publishing scientific literature in 1977 with Gregory Bateson's Steps to an Ecology of Mind. The next important launch took place in 1985 with the Fabula, a series dedicated to modern Italian and foreign fiction, which opened with Milan Kundera's novel The Unbearable Lightness of Being. This publication became one of Adelphi's first bestsellers. Over the years, the publisher has experimented with new book series, though not all of them were destined to become permanent.

== XXI century ==
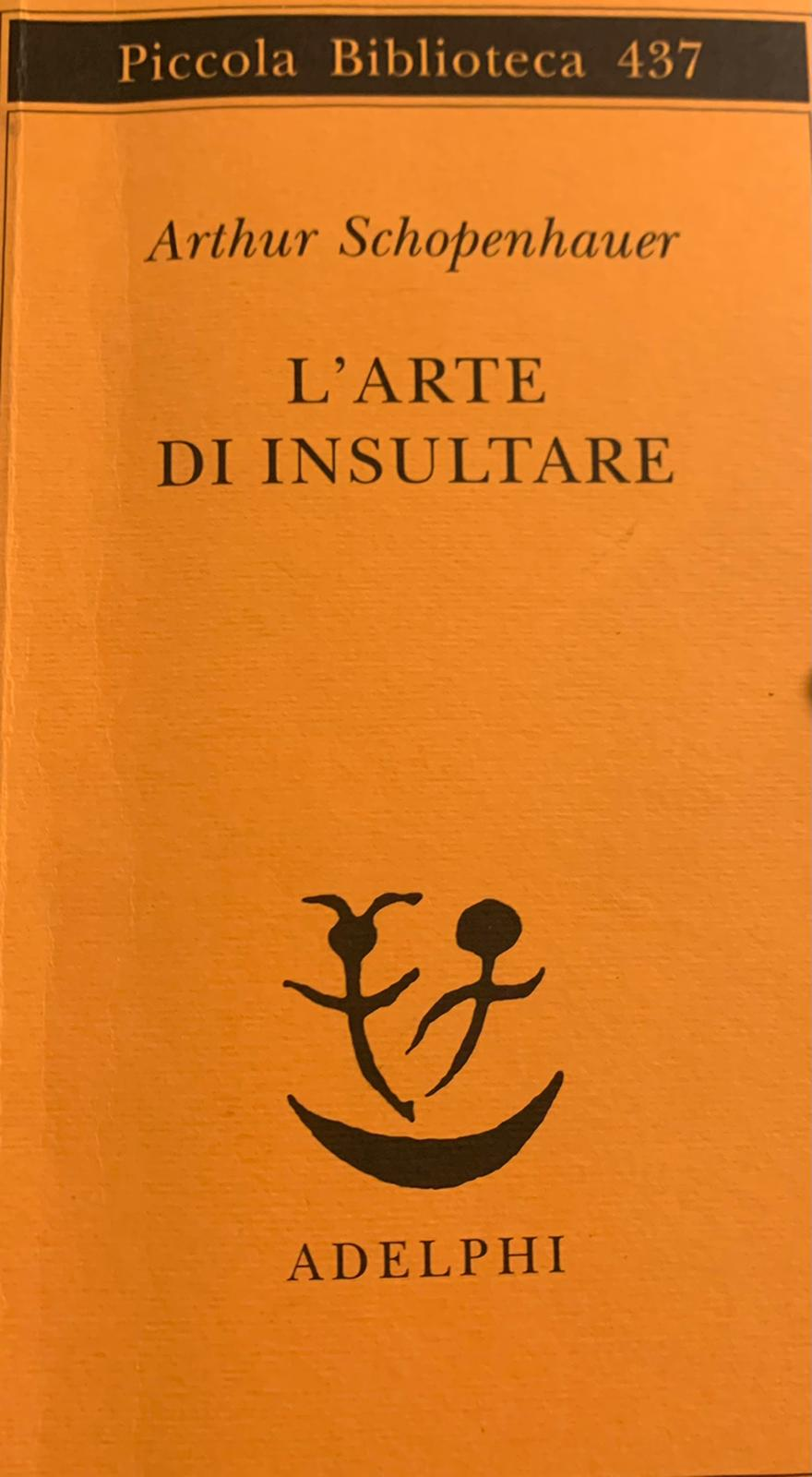
A book by Schopenhauer published in the Piccola Biblioteca (small library) series.

In 2001, the publisher launched Adelphiana, a literary magazine with a collection of essays, short stories and notes by various authors.

In 2016, RCS Media Group, who held a 58% stake in Adelphi, sold its entire books division RCS Libri and its underlying subsidiaries to Mondadori. However, Roberto Calasso regained control of the house through an option to repurchase the shares, becoming a majority holder (71%) and exiting the media group.

By 2016, Biblioteca Adelphi had reached 650 titles while Piccola Biblioteca Adelphi had reached 670.

After Calasso's passing in 2021, Teresa Cremisi was designated as the president of Adelphi, with Roberto Colajanni named as CEO and editorial director.

== Works in translation ==
Adelphi's translated publications include works by Nietzsche, Robert Walser, Georges Simenon, Nabokov, Somerset Maugham, Tolkien, Gottfried Benn, Jack London, Jorge Luis Borges, Elias Canetti, Oliver Sacks, Bruce Chatwin, and Milan Kundera. Bestsellers include 101 Zen Stories and The Unbearable Lightness of Being.

== Italian authors ==
Italian authors published by Adelphi include Roberto Calasso, Leonardo Sciascia, Manlio Sgalambro, Benedetto Croce, Mario Brelich, Tommaso Landolfi, Goffredo Parise, Ennio Flaiano, Giorgio Manganelli, Alberto Savinio, Giorgio Colli, Anna Maria Ortese, and Salvatore Niffoi (winner of the 2006 Premio Campiello).

== Literature ==
- Di Dio, Diego (2016). Adelphiana&f Il Mercato dell'Editoria. Primiceri Editore. ISBN 9788899747626.
- Ferrando, Anna (2023). Adelphi. Le origini di una casa editrice (1938-1994). Rome: Carocci. ISBN 978-88-2901-813-0.
