= Marco Belpoliti =

Italian writer, essayist and critic

Marco Belpoliti (born 1954) is an Italian writer, essayist and critic, who contributes regularly to La Repubblica and L'Espresso, and is currently a professor at the University of Bergamo. He is the author of many books and edited the Einaudi edition of the complete works of Primo Levi.

== Biography ==
Marco Belpoliti was born in Reggio Emilia in 1954 and graduated from the University of Bologna in 1978 having completed a thesis on Semiotics supervised by Umberto Eco. His first published work was his novel Confine: vite immaginarie del clown in 1986. He now teaches Sociology of literature and Italian literature at the University of Bergamo. He is co-editor of the literary magazine Riga, which he co-founded in 1991. Since 1998 he has been a regular contributor to La Stampa and, from 2000, has produced a weekly literary review column to L'Espresso. His contributions to La Repubblica began in 2016.

== Bibliography ==
- Confine: vite immaginarie del clown, Elitropia, Reggio Emilia, 1985.
- Giardino pensile, Libreria Vecchia Reggio, Reggio Emilia 1987
- Quanto basta, Rusconi, Milano 1989 ISBN 88-18-06054-6
- Storie del visibile. Lettura di Italo Calvino, Luisè, Rimini 1990 ISBN 88-85050-39-5; ISBN 88-85050-38-7
- Stati della geometria con calore, Classezero, Monza 1991
- Diario dell'occhio, Bacacay, Bergamo 1993; Le lettere, Firenze, 2008, ISBN 88-6087-166-2; ISBN 978-88-6087-166-4
- Italo, Sestante, Ripatransone 1995 ISBN 88-86114-33-8
- L'occhio di Calvino (Collana Saggi ed.). Torino: Einaudi. 1996. ISBN 88-06-13936-3. 2006 ISBN 88-06-17979-9
- Primo Levi, Bruno Mondadori, Milano 1998 ISBN 88-424-9457-7
- Settanta (Collana Saggi ed.). Torino: Einaudi. 2001. ISBN 88-06-14833-8.
- Doppio zero. Una mappa portatile della contemporaneità (Collana ETascabili ed.). Torino: Einaudi. 2003. ISBN 88-06-16508-9.
- Crolli (Collana Vele ed.). Torino: Einaudi. 2005. ISBN 88-06-17345-6.
- La prova. Un viaggio nell'Est Europa sulle tracce di Primo Levi (Collana L'Arcipelago ed.). Torino: Einaudi. 2007. ISBN 978-88-06-17158-2. - Collana Piccola Biblioteca, Guanda, Parma, 2017, ISBN 978-88-23-51668-7.
- (a cura di, con Gianni Canova e Stefano Chiodi), Annisettanta. Il decennio lungo del secolo breve, Skira, Ginevra-Milano 2007, ISBN 88-6130-474-5; ISBN 978-88-6130-474-1
- La foto di Moro, Nottetempo, Roma 2008 ISBN 88-7452-155-3; ISBN 978-88-7452-155-5
- Il tramezzino del dinosauro: 100 oggetti, comportamenti e manie della vita quotidiana, Guanda, Parma-Milano 2008 ISBN 978-88-6088-825-9
- Il corpo del capo, Guanda, Parma-Milano 2009 ISBN 978-88-6088-542-5
- Berlusconi. Le corps du chef, Nouvelles éditions Lignes, Paris 2010 ISBN 978-2-35526-055-1
- Senza vergogna, Guanda, Parma-Milano 2010 ISBN 978-88-6088-291-2
- Pasolini in salsa piccante, con 8 foto di Ugo Mulas, Guanda, Parma-Milano 2010 ISBN 978-88-6088-429-9
- La canottiera di Bossi, Guanda, Parma-Milano 2012 ISBN 978-88-6088-833-4
- Risentimento, (ebook) Guanda, Parma-Milano 2012 ISBN 978-88-235-0384-7
- Visioni, (ebook), doppiozero, Milano 2012 ISBN 978-88-97685-01-2
- Da quella prigione. Moro, Warhol e le Brigate Rosse, Guanda, Parma-Milano 2012 ISBN 978-88-235-0175-1
- Camera Straniera, Johan & Levi, Milano 2012 ISBN 978-88-6010-076-4
- Il segreto di Goya, Johan & Levi, Milano 2013 ISBN 978-88-6010-101-3
- L'età dell'estremismo, Guanda, Milano 2014 ISBN 978-88-235-0670-1
- Primo Levi. Di fronte e di profilo (Collana Biblioteca della Fenice ed.). Parma: Guanda. 2015. ISBN 978-88-6088-445-9.
- La strategia della farfalla, Guanda, Parma 2015, ISBN 978-88-235-1412-6.

=== Editor ===
- Effetto Emilia, Officina immagine, Bologna, 1981
- Mardi: rien. Existe: (Sartre): Esistenzialismi, Reggio Emilia (mostra a novembre 1981-febbraio 1982), Tecnograf, 1982
- Primo Levi, Opere, 2 voll., Nuova Universale Einaudi 225, Einaudi, Torino, 1997 ISBN 88-06-14637-8
- Primo Levi, Conversazioni e interviste 1963-1987, a cura di M. Belpoliti, Einaudi, Torino, 1997 ISBN 88-06-14348-4
  - (in French) trad. Dominique Autrand, Conversations et entretiens, 1963-1987, Laffont, Paris, 2000
  - (in English) trad. Robert Gordon, The voice of memory: interviews 1961-1987, New Press, New York, 2001
  - (in Danish) trad. Jytte Lollesgaard, Samtaler og interview 1963-1987, Forum, Copenaghen, 2003
- Primo Levi, L'ultimo Natale di guerra, Einaudi, Torino, 2002 ISBN 88-06-16042-7
  - (in French) trad. Nathalie Bauer, 1018, Dernier Noël de guerre Paris, 2002
  - (in Spanish) trad. Miquel Izquierdo, Ultima Navidad de guerra, El Aleph, Barcelona, 2003
- Primo Levi, L'asimmetria e la vita. Articoli e saggi 1955-1987, Einaudi, Torino, 2002, ISBN 88-06-16050-8.
- Primo Levi, Tutti i racconti, Einaudi, Torino, 2005, ISBN 88-06-17917-9.
- Giorgio Manganelli, Mammifero italiano, Adelphi, Milano, 2007, ISBN 88-459-2137-9.
- Primo Levi, Ist Das Ein Mensch?, Hanser Verlag, München, 2011, ISBN 978-3-446-23744-5
- Gianni Celati, Romanzi, cronache e racconti, con Nunzia Palmieri, Mondadori, Milano, 2016 ISBN 978-88-04-65876-4
- Primo Levi, Opere Complete (2 voll.), Einaudi, Torino 2016.
