= Piero Camporesi =

Italian historian (1926–1997)

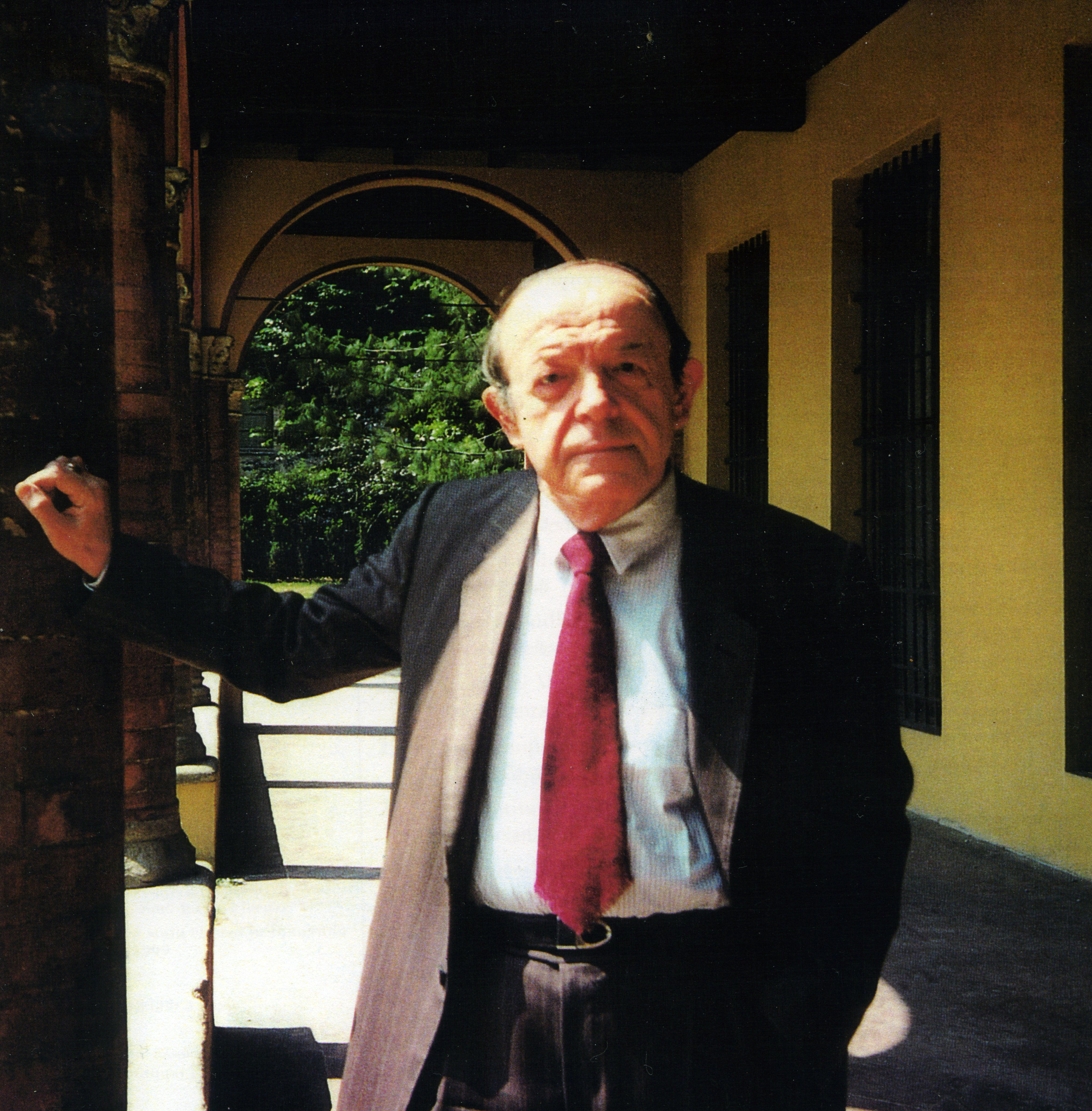
Piero Camporesi

Piero Camporesi (15 February 1926, in Forlì – 24 August 1997, in Bologna) was an Italian historian of literature and an anthropologist. He was a professor of Italian literature at the University of Bologna.

== Works ==
(English translations)

- Il Brodo Indiano (Exotic Brew, English translation by Christopher Woodall)
- La casa dell'eternità (The fear of hell: images of damnation and salvation in early modern Europe, English translation by Lucinda Byatt)
- Le officine dei sensi (The anatomy of the senses: natural symbols in medieval and early modern Italy, English translation by Allan Cameron)
- Il sugo della vita (Juice of life: the symbolic and magic significance of blood, English translation by Robert R. Barr, foreword by Umberto Eco)
- Bread of Dreams
- La terra e la luna: alimentazione folclore societa (The magic harvest : food, folklore and society, English translation by Joan Krakover Hall)

(Works published in Italy)

- "Petrarca 66: l'aer gravato e l'importuna nebbia" (in Giornale italiano di filologia, a. 4, n. 4, 28 novembre 1951, pp. 320–22)
- "Giuseppe D'Alessandro poeta barocco tra seicento e settecento" (in Convivium 1952, pp. 397–426)
- "Biltri, blittri" (Lingua nostra, vol. 13, 3, 1952, pp. 70–72)
- Il tema dell'Adynaton nel Canzoniere del Petrarca (Milano: De Silvestri, 1952)
- "Una lettera inedita di Lodovico di Breme al Ginguene" (Torino: Societa editrice internazionale, 1953, pp. 255–62)
- "Documenti per la storia del romanticismo italiano: pensieri inediti di Pietro Borsieri" (in Convivium, 1955, pp. 192–97)
- "Goldoni, Venezia e i romantici" (in Convivium, n.s., 1958, pp. 170–73)
- (edit by) Ludovico di Breme, Il Romitorio di sant'Ida (Bologna: Commissione per i testi di lingua, 1961)
- "Una vita romantica di Maria Antonietta" (in Convivium, n.s. 1961, pp. 80–84)
- (edit by) Ludovico di Breme, Lettere (Torino: Einaudi 1966)
- (review to) "Pietro Borsieri, Avventure letterarie di un giorno e altri scritti editi e inediti" (Lettere italiane, a. 20., n. 3 luglio-settembre 1968, pp. 424–25)
- (edit by) Vittorio Alfieri, Estratti d'Ossian e da Stazio per la tragica (Asti: Casa d'Alfieri, 1969)
- (edit by) Pellegrino Artusi, La scienza in cucina e l'arte di mangiar bene (Torino: Einaudi 1970 e 2001)
- (edit by) Il libro dei vagabondi: lo Speculum cerretanorum di Teseo Pini, Il vagabondo di Rafaele Frianoro e altri testi di furfanteria (Torino: Einaudi 1973)
- "La cucina popolare emiliano-romagnola: continuità e cambiamento" (Atti del 4° convegno dell'Accademia italiana della cucina, Parma-Bologna, 8-10 giugno 1973, pp. 109–33)
- (edit by) Giulio Cesare Croce, Le sottilissime astuzie di Bertoldo (Torino: Einaudi 1973 e Milano: Berlusconi 1994)
- "Italo Calvino", in Dizionario critico della letteratura italiana (Torino: Utet 1974, pp. 449–64)
- "Giuseppe Mazzini", in Dizionario critico della letteratura italiana (Torino: Utet 1974, pp. 545–60)
- "Lo stereotipo del Romagnolo" (Studi romagnoli, XXV, 1974, pp. 393–411)
- "Carnevale, cuccagna e giuochi di villa" (Studi e problemi di critica testuale, 1975, 10, pp. 57–97)
- La maschera di Bertoldo: G.C. Croce e la letteratura carnevalesca (Torino: Einaudi 1976 e Milano: Garzanti 1993)
- (edit by) Giulio Cesare Croce, Le astuzie di Bertoldo e le semplicità di Bertoldino (Torino: Einaudi 1978 e Milano: Garzanti 1993)
- "Alimentazione e cucina" (in Storia della Emilia-Romagna, vol. 2, 1978, pp. 501–16)
- Il paese della fame (Bologna: Il mulino 1978 e 1985, Milano: Garzanti 2000)
- Il pane selvaggio (Bologna: Il mulino 1980, Milano: Garzanti 2004)
- Alimentazione, folklore, società (Parma: Pratiche 1980 e 1983)
- (introduction to) Giuseppe Cocchiara, Il mondo alla rovescia (Torino: Boringhieri 1981)
- "Cultura popolare e cultura d'élite fra Medioevo ed età moderna" (in Storia d'Italia, vol. 4: Intellettuali e potere, Torino: Einaudi 1981)
- "Le erbe del sogno e della sopravvivenza" (Medicina, erbe e magia, Milano: Silvana 1981, pp. 54–78)
- "Speziali e ciarlatani" (Medicina, erbe e magia, Milano: Silvana 1981, pp. 138–59)
- "La ruota del tempo" (Cultura popolare nell'Emilia-Romagna, strutture rurali e vita contadina, Milano: Silvana, 1977, pp. 36–49)
- "Il campo, il fuoco, la tavola" (Cultura popolare nell'Emilia-Romagna, espressioni sociali e luoghi d'incontro, Milano: Silvana, 1977, pp. 50–73)
- "La condizione vegetale: uomini, erbe, bestie" (Cultura popolare nell'Emilia-Romagna, medicina erbe e magia, Milano: Silvana, s.d., pp. 118–35)
- La carne impassibile: salvezza e salute tra Medioevo e Controriforma (Milano: Il saggiatore 1983 e Garzanti 1994)
- Odori e sapori: (introduction to) Alain Corbin, Storia sociale degli odori. XVIII e XIX secolo (Milano: Mondadori, 1983 e 2005)
- (preface to) Aureliano Bassani, Eminenza, il pranzo e servito : le ricette di Alberto Alvisi cuoco del card. Chiaramonti vescovo di Imola (1785-1800) (Bologna: Aniballi 1984)
- Il sugo della vita: simbolismo e magia del sangue (Milano: Comunità 1984, Mondadori 1988 e Garzanti 1997)
- Le officine dei sensi (Milano: Garzanti 1985 e 1991)
- La casa dell'eternità (Milano: Garzanti 1987 e 1998)
- I balsami di Venere (Milano: Garzanti 1989 e 2007)
- "La sestina del Petrarca e l'interpretazione di un passo di Benvenuto da Imola" (Giornale italiano di filologia, s.d.)
- La terra e la luna: alimentazione folclore societa (Milano: Il saggiatore 1989 e Garzanti 1995)
- La miniera del mondo: artieri inventori impostori (Milano: Il saggiatore 1990)
- Il brodo indiano: edonismo ed esotismo nel Settecento (Milano: Garzanti 1989 e 1998)
- Rustici e buffoni: cultura popolare e cultura d'elite fra Medioevo ed eta moderna (Torino: Einaudi 1991)
- Le belle contrade: nascita del paesaggio italiano (Milano: Garzanti 1992)
- Le vie del latte: dalla Padania alla steppa (Milano: Garzanti 1993)
- Il ghetto: Bologna, storia e rinascita di un luogo (Bologna: Grafis 1993)
- Il palazzo e il cantimbanco (Milano: Garzanti 1994)
- Il governo del corpo: saggi in miniatura (Milano: Garzanti 1995 e 2008)
- "Schede secentesche" (Studi secenteschi, vol. 38, 1997, pp. 396–414)
- Camminare il mondo: vita e avventure di Leonardo Fioravanti medico del Cinquecento (Milano: Garzanti 1997 e 2007).

== Studies on Piero Camporesi ==
- Elide Casali (edit by), "Academico di nulla academia". Saggi su Piero Camporesi, Bologna, Bononia University Press, 2006 (con prefazione di Gian Mario Anselmi e saggi di Emilio Pasquini, Renato Badalì, Albano Biondi, Marco Belpoliti, Peter Burke, Glauco Sanga, Lucio Gambi, Ezio Raimondi, Maurice Aymard. Completa l'opera una Bibliografia degli scritti di Piero Camporesi a cura di Paolo Tinti).
- Marco Belpoliti (edit by), Piero Camporesi, in «Riga», n. 26, Milano, Marcos y Marcos, 2008 (con saggi di Maria Corti, Giorgio Manganelli, Carlo Ossola, Marco Belpoliti, Ottavio Cecchi, Alfredo Giuliani, Philippe Ariès, Giovanni Giudici, Antonio Porta, Alfonso Maria Di Nola, Franco Cardini, Georges Balandier, Guido Almansi, Giancarlo Mazzacurati, Umberto Eco, Pierre Lepape, René de Ceccatty, Inuhiko Yomota, Hidenobu Jinnai, Marino Biondi, Oliviero Ponte di Pino, Elide Casali, Pierpaolo Antonello, Marco Antonio Bazzocchi, Etsuko Nakayama, Alberto Natale, Diego Zancani).
- Elide Casali, Marcello Soffritti (edit by), Camporesi nel mondo. L'opera e le traduzioni, Atti del Convegno Internazionale di Studi. Forlì, 5-6-7- marzo 2008, Bologna, Bononia University Press, 2009 (con interventi di Maria Gioia Tavoni, Paolo Tinti, Marino Biondi, Giuseppe Ledda, Francesca Gatta, Umberto Eco, Diego Zancani, Stijn Van Hamme, Luisa Rubini, David Gentilcore, Etsuko Nakayama, Maria Carrerars i Goicoechea, Adele D'Arcangelo, Anabela Cristina Costa da Siva Ferreira, Licia Reggiani, Marcello Soffritti, Elide Casali).
