= Forgione =

Forgione is an Italian surname. Notable people with the surname include:

- Alessio Forgione (born 1986), Italian writer
- Bob Forgione (1929–1994), American comic book and comic strip artist
- Carl Forgione (1944–1998), British actor
- Francesco Forgione:
  - Francesco Forgione (Padre Pio, or Saint Pio of Pietrelcina; 1887–1968), Italian priest
  - Francesco Forgione (politician) (born 1960), Italian politician
- Larry Forgione (born 1952), American chef
- Marc Forgione (born 1978), American chef
