= Luka Novak =

- Born: 1.8.1963
- Citizenship: Slovenian
- Education: PhD, MBA
- Alma mater: University of Ljubljana, University of Bonn
- Occupations: Author, Publisher, TV Presenter, Intellectual Property Expert
- Notable work: Le Métro, Inconscient urbain; Phénoménologie de la mayonnaise; The Golden Shower
- Television: The 50 Books That Made Slovenia; The 50 Songs That Sang Slovenia
- Spouse: Valentina Smej Novak
- Parents: Andrej (father); Edvina (mother)
- Honours: Chevalier de l'Ordre des Arts et des Lettres; Cavaliere dell'Ordine della Stella d'Italia

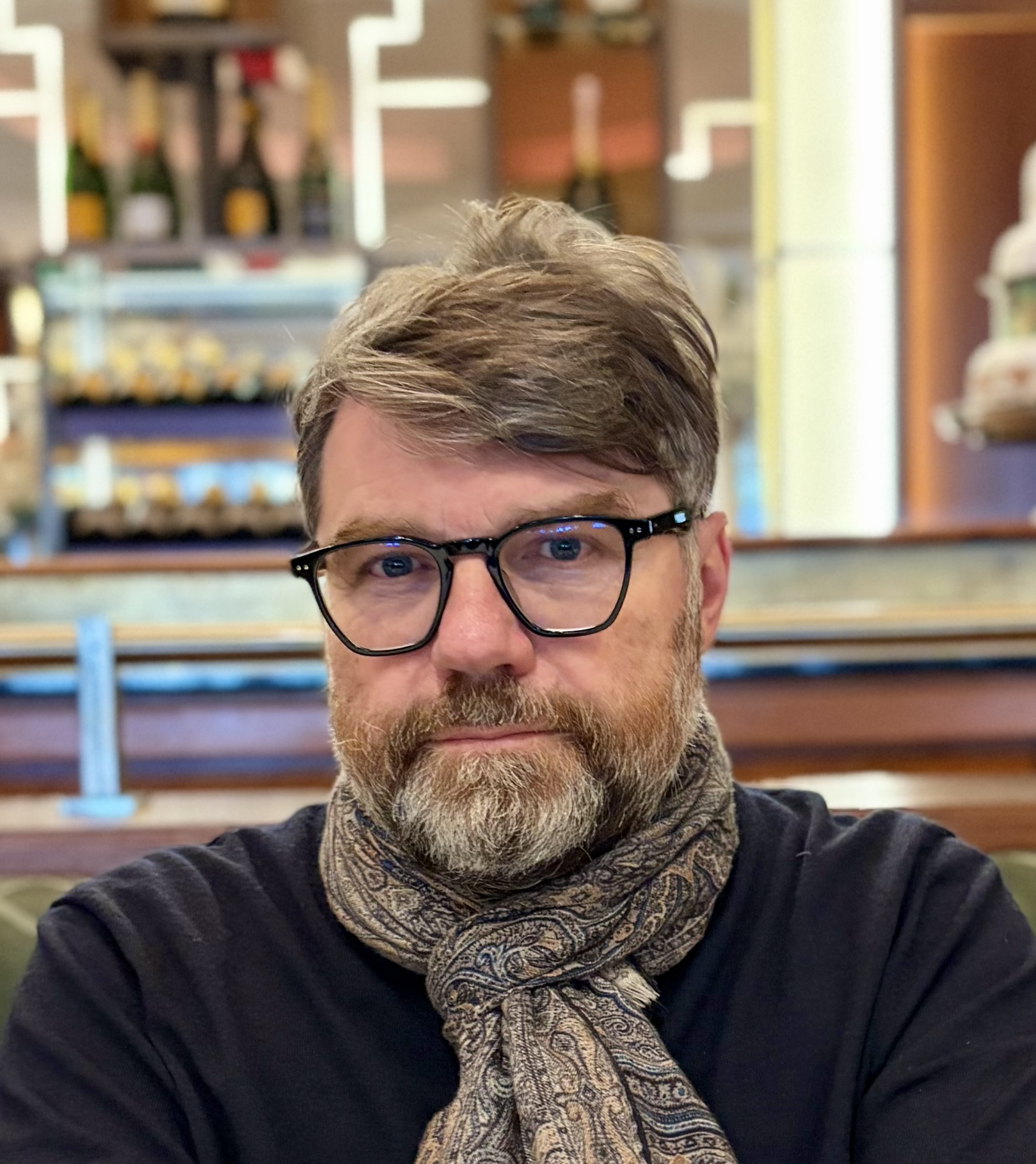
Luka Novak in Paris, 2025

Luka Novak (1963) is a Slovenian author, publisher, TV personality and intellectual property expert. He founded Vale-Novak and Totaliteta Publishers. He was the director of the Slovenian Intellectual Property Office, and is active as a consultant in EU Projects and Copyright Organisations. He has a PhD in Literary Studies from the University of Ljubljana and an MBA from the IEDC Bled School of Management.

== Author and Publisher ==
Totaliteta Publications published his work in Ljubljana, Guernica Editions in Toronto and by Editions Léo Scheer in France. His book Le Métro, Inconscient urbain, a psychogeographical analysis of public transport in Paris, New York and Tokyo, received reviews in French media such as Le Monde and France Culture. His book Phénoménologie de la mayonnaise, a historical, anthropological and philosophical analysis of gastronomy, was written in French and published in 2018 by Editions Léo Scheer. The book came out in an updated Slovenian edition under the title Polje gastronomije: od racionalizma prek absolutizma do družabnih omrežij (The Gastronomic Field: From Rationalism and Absolutism to Social Media) and was nominated for the Rožanc Prize for best essay in 2019. The French version of the book was part of an exhibition on French eating habits through photography, staged in Marseille's Mucem in 2018, stressing the role of social media in the development of the representation of food.

In 2025, Luka Novak published a book on Paris, Pariz na vse strani (Paris on All Fronts), bridging the author's Parisian childhood with his contemporary relationship to Paris as an adult, combining memoirs and cultural critique with elements of psychogeography, documentarism, political analysis and guidebook. In 2026, he authored From Lost Illusions to Artificial Intelligence (Consumer Society Between Balzac and Pasolini), published by the Slovenian Academy of Sciences and Arts Publishing House (ZRC SAZU), a monographic study on the representations, development and influence of consumer society in French and Italian literatures.

As a publisher at Vale-Novak and Totaliteta Publications, Luka Novak published, edited or translated over 300 Slovenian publications, ranging from literary authors such as Julian Barnes, Paul Auster and Hanif Kureishi to upmarket commercial writers like Paulo Coelho, Alain de Botton and Madonna. He also translated and published numerous cuisine titles, featuring authors such as Gordon Ramsay, Jamie Oliver and Anthony Bourdain. His recent publications and translations include mathematician Cédric Villani, philosopher Slavoj Žižek, historians Timothy Snyder and Piero Camporesi, and novelists Paolo Cognetti and Sandro Veronesi, and Paul Auster's last novel, Baumgartner (2024).

== Education ==
He studied Comparative Literature, French, Italian and Romance Philology (Universities of Ljubljana, Bonn, Tübingen, 1989–1993). He has a Ph.D. in Literary Studies, degrees in Comparative Literature (1987), French and Italian Philology (1992), and obtained an MBA in 1997 (IEDC Bled School of Management, 1997). He was a visiting scholar at the University of Tübingen and completed publishing and strategy courses at Stanford University.

== Media career ==
Luka Novak is a Slovenian TV personality and has co-written and co-hosted (with his wife Valentina Smej Novak) 120 episodes of gastronomical and lifestyle TV shows for various Slovenian TV channels (POP TV, Planet TV). The shows reached considerable audience shares and were followed by the publication of several best-selling cookbooks (2009-2017).

Luka Novak is involved in the making of a major national TV campaign promoting Slovenian literature called 50 knjig, ki so nas napisale (The 50 Books That Shaped Slovenia) where he is the co-author (with his wife Valentina Smej Novak) and presenter of fifty eight-minute documentary TV episodes depicting and assessing the role of the most important books that contributed to the development and formation of Slovenia as a nation. The series is conceived as a fresh approach to classical topics and is aired weekly by the Channel 1 of the Slovenian National TV. It features interviews with scholars, intellectuals and celebrities, using infographics, animation and archive materials to communicate information to a general audience. The campaign was backed by an extensive awareness campaign on social media. The series was followed by The 50 Songs That Sang Slovenia which applied the successful format to Slovenia's musical development (50 episodes, 2020-2023).

== Intellectual Property Expert ==
Luka Novak was the director of the Slovenian Intellectual Property Office. He is active in SAZOR, the Slovenian Organisation of Authors and Publishers for Reproduction Rights, and as Vice-Chair of the European Group at IFRRO (International Federation of Reproduction Rights Organisations). He is a Key Expert in EU projects and is involved in copyright awareness campaigns on European level. He speaks at various national and international conferences on copyright law and collective management issues, and writes for the leading Slovenian legal practice magazine Pravna Praksa.

== Publications (Literature and Essays) ==
- Kič in glasba pri Kunderi (Kitsch and Music in Milan Kundera), essay, Ljubljana 1985
- Preskočimo postmodernizem (Skipping Postmodernism), essay, Ljubljana 1986
- Stereotype (feature film, with director Damjan Kozole), 1997
- The Vatican in Ecstasy of Communication, An essay on Pope Wojtyla's philosophy, Ljubljana, 2005
- The Golden Shower or What Men Want, novel, Ljubljana 2008, Toronto 2012
- The Feeling of Spring in Litzirüti, novel, Ljubljana 2012
- Ljubezen skozi želodec 1, 2 (Contemporary Family Cooking, w. Valentina Smej Novak), Ljubljana 2009, 2010
- Preprosto slovensko (Modern Slovenian Cookery), Ljubljana 2011
- Ku-Ku Benetke, A Cultural and Culinary Guide to Venice, Ljubljana 2011
- Le Métro, Inconscient urbain, Paris 2017
- Phénoménologie de la mayonnaise, Paris 2018
- Polje gastronomije, od racionalizma prek absolutizma do družabnih omrežij, Ljubljana 2019
- Pariz na vse strani (Spomini in kulturna zgodovina skozi pol stoletja pariškega življenja), Ljubljana 2025
- Od izgubljenih iluzij do umetne inteligence (Potrošniška družba med Balzacom in Pasolinijem), Ljubljana 2026

== Academic Publications (Intellectual Property and Copyright Issues) ==
Educational Exceptions in the EU Directive on Copyright in the Digital Single Market, Ljubljana 2019.

Private Copy and Other Private Uses of Copyrighted Material: An Overview of Legal Frameworks From the Berne Convention to National Laws, Ljubljana 2019.

The Copyright Issues of Digitalising Universal Book Heritage, Ljubljana 2019.

Roald Dahl and the Question of Moral Rights, Ljubljana 2023.

Copyright Issues of AI Applications, Ljubljana 2023.

== Awards ==
Chevalier de l'Ordre des Arts et des Lettres by the French Minister of Culture in 2018.

Cavaliere dell'Ordine della Stella d'Italia by the President of the Italian Republic in 2019.

Shortlisted for the Rožanc Award, the Slovenian prize for best essay in 2019.
