= Franco Volpi =

Franco Volpi may refer to:

- Franco Volpi (actor) (1921–1997)
- Franco Volpi (runner) (1936–2013)
- Franco Volpi (philosopher) (1952–2009)
