= Fanny Rubio =

Spanish professor, researcher and writer

- Born: Francisca Rubio Gámez; 18 October 1949 (age 76); Linares, Spain
- Education: University of Granada
- Occupations: Academic, literary critic
- Employers: Complutense University of Madrid; University of Al Quaraouiyine
- Spouse: Bernabé López García
- Awards: Meridiana Award (2007); Commander of the Order of Isabella the Catholic (2009)
- Website: www.fannyrubio.com

Francisca Rubio Gámez (born 18 October 1949), better known by the pseudonym Fanny Rubio, is a Spanish professor, researcher, and writer, an expert in contemporary Spanish poetry.

== Biography ==
Born in Linares on 18 October 1949, Fanny Rubio began her university studies in Granada, then graduated in Hispanic Philology from the Complutense University of Madrid in 1971. She earned a PhD in Romance Philology from the University of Granada in December 1975, with a doctoral thesis about poetry magazines in Francoist Spain. Linked to the University of Granada since 1971 as a research fellow, she went to Fez, Morocco with her husband, Bernabé López García, a specialist in Arab History and Culture, in 1974. Rubio taught two courses at the University of Al Quaraouiyine. In the 1976–77 academic year she was an adjunct professor hired by the National University of Distance Education (UNED) of Madrid. Since 1977 she has been a Complutense professor, first as an adjunct, then as a titular professor, and finally as a full professor of Spanish Literature since 2009.

She married Bernabé López García in 1971 and has one daughter.

== Career ==
In 1966 Rubio's first book, Primeros poemas, was published, and in 1970 she won the Complutense University's Poetry Prize with her book Acribillado amor. In those years, already in Granada, she came into contact with the Communist Party of Spain (PCE) and the Workers' Commissions union. She participated in the organic life of the PCE through its Culture Committee, where she made close friends like Juan Genovés, Armando López Salinas, Cristina Almeida (whom she visited in the Carabanchel jail), Elisa Serna and Teresa Rial (prisoners in Yeserías), Dulcinea Bellido, Carmen Rodríguez, and Josefina Samper. She wrote for the related press, such as Mundo Obrero, Nuestra Bandera, and the magazines Argumentos, Materiales, and Mientras tanto. In 1982 she dissociated herself from the PCE, although not from her trade union militancy. That year she published Retracciones, a book of poems from a bygone era.

She traveled to Germany in 1985 with Basilio Martín Patino and a group of friends, and from this experience her book of poetry Dresde was born, published in 1990. In the late 1990s she coordinated the summer humanities courses of the Complutense University of Madrid. It was a time of effervescence and creation. She published the poetry books Reverso (1988), En re menor (1990), Urbes (1991), and Cuadrantes, the short story collection A Madrid por capricho (1988), and the literary critique Dámaso Alonso, Hijos de la ira (1990). In 1992, she published her first novel, La sal del chocolate, in which she recounts the period of the political transition, which she experienced firsthand. In 1995 she published the novel La casa del halcón, in which a journalist is complicit in a situation which gets away from her. She was also an advisor on the TVE documentary series Esta es mi tierra, which featured writers such as Jon Juaristi and Luis Landero.

In 1998 Rubio published the novel El dios dormido. In its presentation, at the Círculo de Bellas Artes in Madrid, twelve women honored the Mary Magdalene protagonist of the work: Carmen Alborch, Amalia Iglesias, Rosa Pereda, Isabel Vilallonga, Cristina Sánchez, Dulce Chacón, Ángeles Caso, Marina Rosell, Ana Rossetti, Margarita Pinto, Beatriz Herranz, and Clara Janés.

Her novel El hijo del aire (2001) is part of a trilogy dedicated to recovering contemporary memory and addresses the issue of the disappearances of the Argentine dictatorship. It was brought to the stage by José Luis Fernández and the group Escalinata Teatro de Jaén in 2002.

=== Instituto Cervantes ===
Fanny Rubio was appointed director of the Instituto Cervantes in Rome in May 2006, at the proposal of its director, César Antonio Molina. She held the position for two years in the Italian capital. In 2009 she was named a Commander of the Order of Isabella the Catholic for her work outside of Spain.

== Historical memory ==
In 2006 she denounced the city of Valencia's mistreatment of the mortal remains of her grandparents, buried in its civil cemetery. In June she signed a letter, along with other progressive intellectuals such as Joan Oleza, Cristina Almeida, and Matías Alonso, asking the Pope to mediate in the protection of the common grave of Valencia.

== Feminism ==
Fanny Rubio's work emphasizes an original feminism that has little to do with conventional feminism. She has researched the shift in women as objects of representation subject to their own personality, a change experienced in all the orders of society. And she has tried to show how, throughout the history of literature, the female subject takes on a deterritorialized language. On the occasion of the centenary of the publication of Don Quixote, she directed the study "El Quijote en clave de mujeres", which collects almost twenty essays on the role of women in this work. In a conference she said: "Miguel de Cervantes was ahead of his time and a reference for freedom for women."

== Distinctions ==
- 2007 Meridiana Award, from the Andalusian Women's Institute
- Commander of the Order of Isabella the Catholic, from the Council of Ministers of Spain (2009)

== Selected works ==
=== Novels ===
- La sal del chocolate, Barcelona, Seix Barral, 1992
- La casa del halcón, Madrid, Alfaguara, 1995
- El dios dormido, Madrid, Alfaguara, 1998
- El hijo del aire, Barcelona, Planeta, 2001
- Fuegos de invierno bajo los puentes de Madrid, Madrid, 2006

=== Literary criticism ===
- Las revistas poéticas españolas, 1939-1975 (doctoral thesis), Madrid, Turner, 1976; reissued by the University of Alicante, 2004
- Comentarios de textos, in collaboration with V. Granados, Madrid, UNED, 1977
- Pueblo Cautivo, anonymous work, facsimile edition with prologue by Fanny Rubio, Madrid, Hiperión, 1978
- Poesía española contemporánea. Historia y antología (1939–1980), in collaboration with José Luis Falcó, Madrid, Alhambra, 1981
- Cuadrantes, essay, prologue by Rafael Alberti, Jaén, Diputación de Jaén, 1985
- Hijos de la ira, de Dámaso Alonso, Madrid, Espasa-Calpe, Colección Austral, 1990, editing and prologue
- Rafael Morales. Homenajes, in collaboration with Sabina de la Cruz García, Javier Huerta Calvo, Jaime Olmedo, José Paulino Ayuso, and Emilio Miró, Madrid, Complutense University, 1995
- Imanol, una voz de tierra y viento, in collaboration with Carmen Peyre, Madrid, Fundación Autor, 2001
- Antología (1939–1968), by Leopoldo de Luis, Madrid, Biblioteca Nueva, 2000, research, prologue, editing, bibliography and notes, in collaboration with Jorge Urrutia
- El embrujo de amar, Madrid, Planeta, Temas de Hoy, 2001
- Memorias de Adriano, by Marguerite Yourcenar, Barcelona, Círculo de Lectores, Biblioteca Universal, 2002, preliminary research
- ¿Dónde está Blas de Otero? La poesía de Blas de Otero como ficción autobiográfica, various authors, Ancia, 4, 2004, reissued by Blas de Otero Medio siglo, Actas, 2008
- "El poeta visionario", in Ángel Crespo, Con el tiempo, contra el tiempo, various authors, Fundación Jorge Guillén, 2005
- Mujeres de Marruecos, in collaboration with El Hassane Arabi, Madrid, Libros Clan, 2005
- El Quijote en clave de mujer/es, various authors, editing, Madrid, Editorial Complutense, 2005
- El Juan Ramón de Aurora de Albornoz, Madrid, Devenir, 2008, editing and prologue
- Baeza de Machado, Sevilla, Fundación José Manuel Lara, 2008
- La poesía de la Noche Oscura de San Juan de la Cruz, Centro de Estudios Linarenses, 2011
