= Teresa Cremisi =

French-Italian publisher (born 1945)

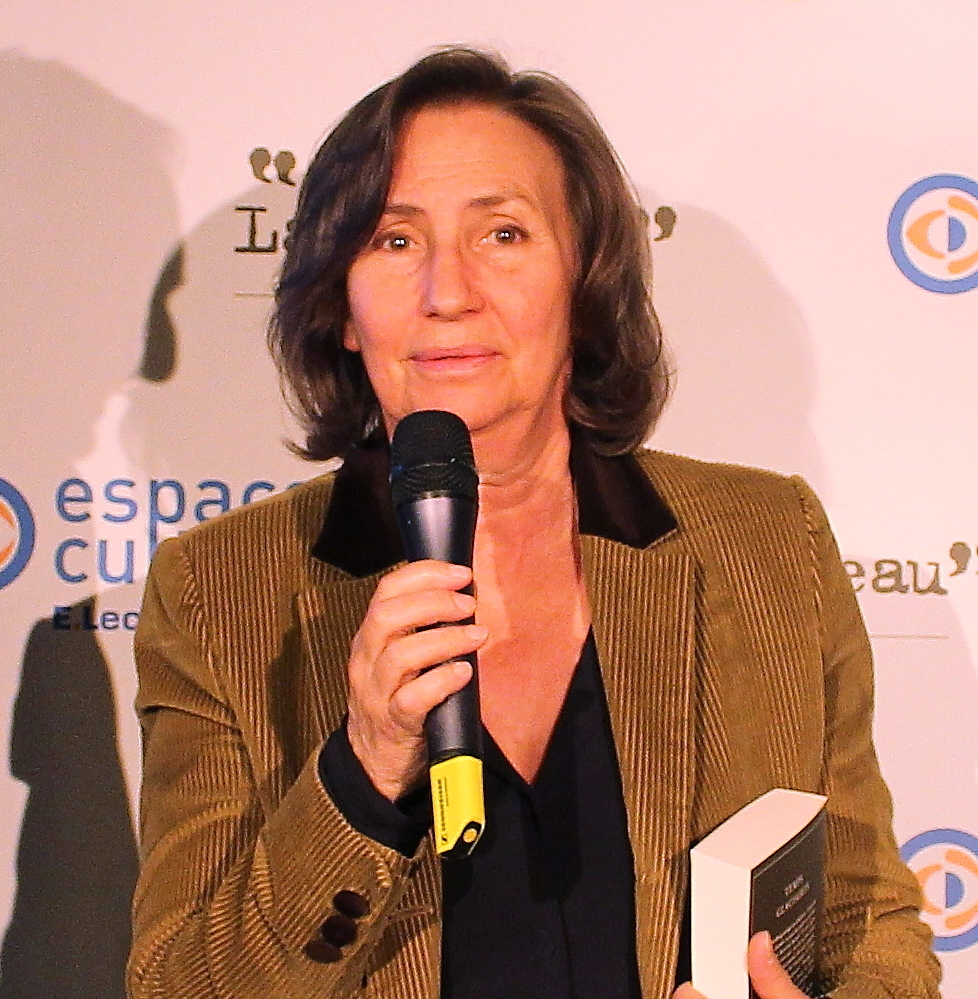
Teresa Cremisi

Teresa Cremisi (born October 7, 1945) is an Egyptian-born Italian publisher and writer. She was born in Alexandria, where she attended the French Catholic boarding school Notre-Dame de Sion d'Alexandrie. She left Egypt with her family after the Suez Crisis of 1956. The family settled in Milan, and Teresa took a degree in foreign languages and literature at Bocconi University.

She worked for many years with the French publisher Antoine Gallimard, before joining the Flammarion group as its chief executive in 2005. She ran Flammarion for a decade before stepping down in 2015. Since then she has won distinction as a writer. Her debut novel The Triumphant won the Prix Mediterranee in 2016.

In 2021 she was appointed president of Adelphi Edizioni.
