= Prix Méditerranée =

The Prix Méditerranée (Mediterranean Prize) is a French literary award. It was created in 1984 in Perpignan by the Mediterranean Centre of Literature (CML) to promote cultural interaction among the numerous countries surrounding the Mediterranean Sea. Two awards are handed out every year, the Prix Méditerranée itself and the Prix Méditerranée Étranger (or the Overseas Mediterranean Prize). The latter is given to a writer from the Mediterranean basin whose original work has been translated into French.

== List of winners ==
=== Prix Méditerranée ===
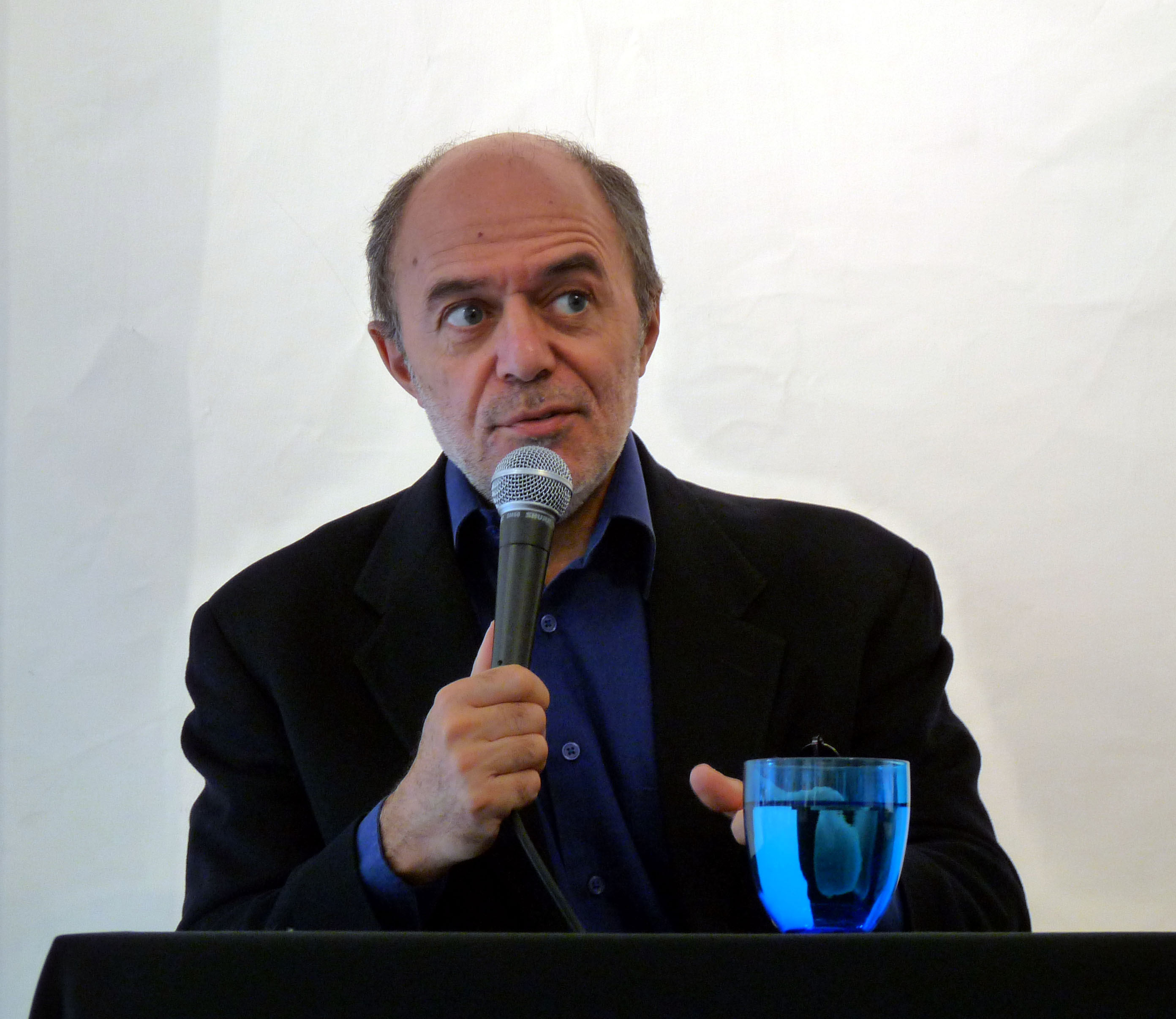
Pierre Assouline

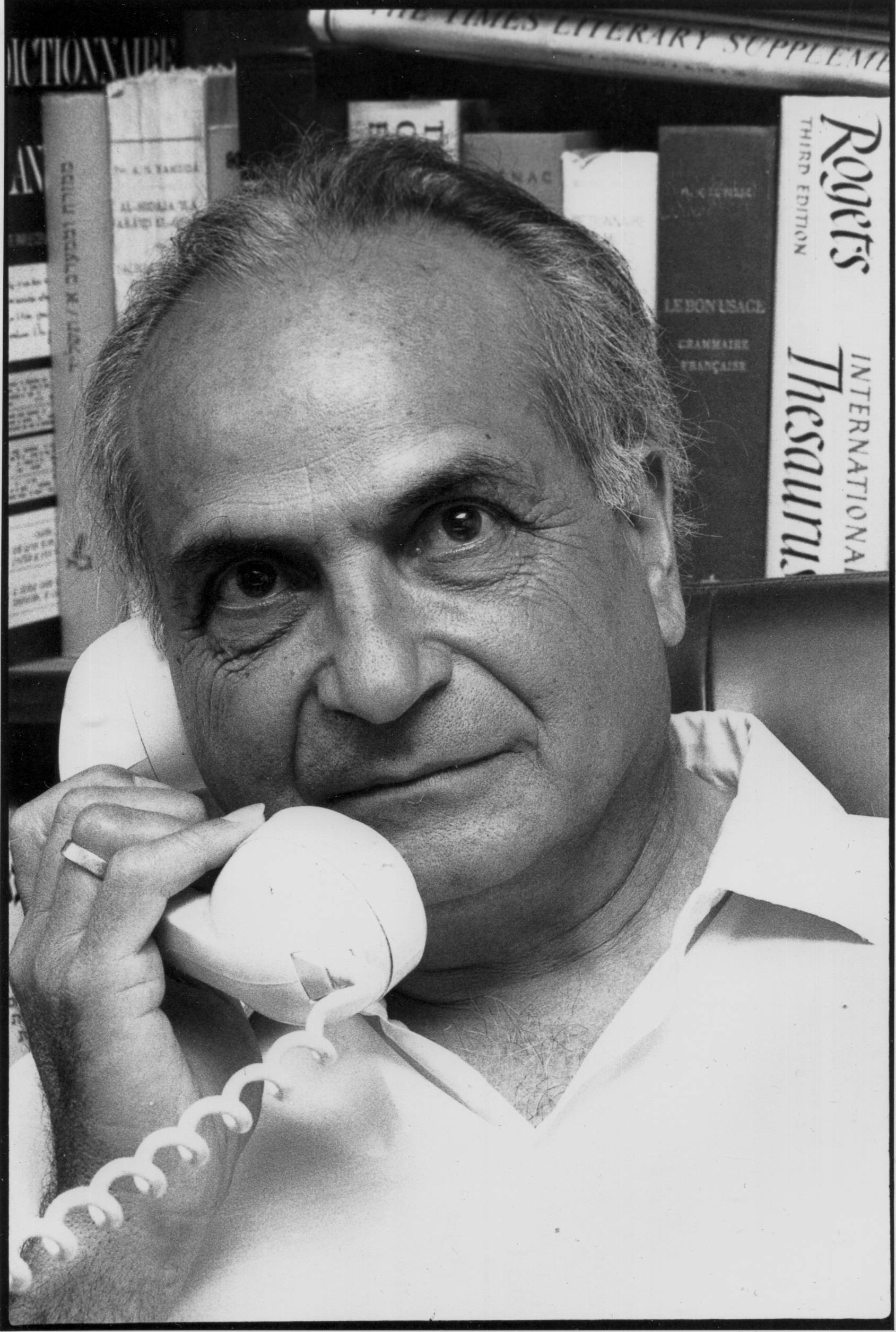
André Chouraqui

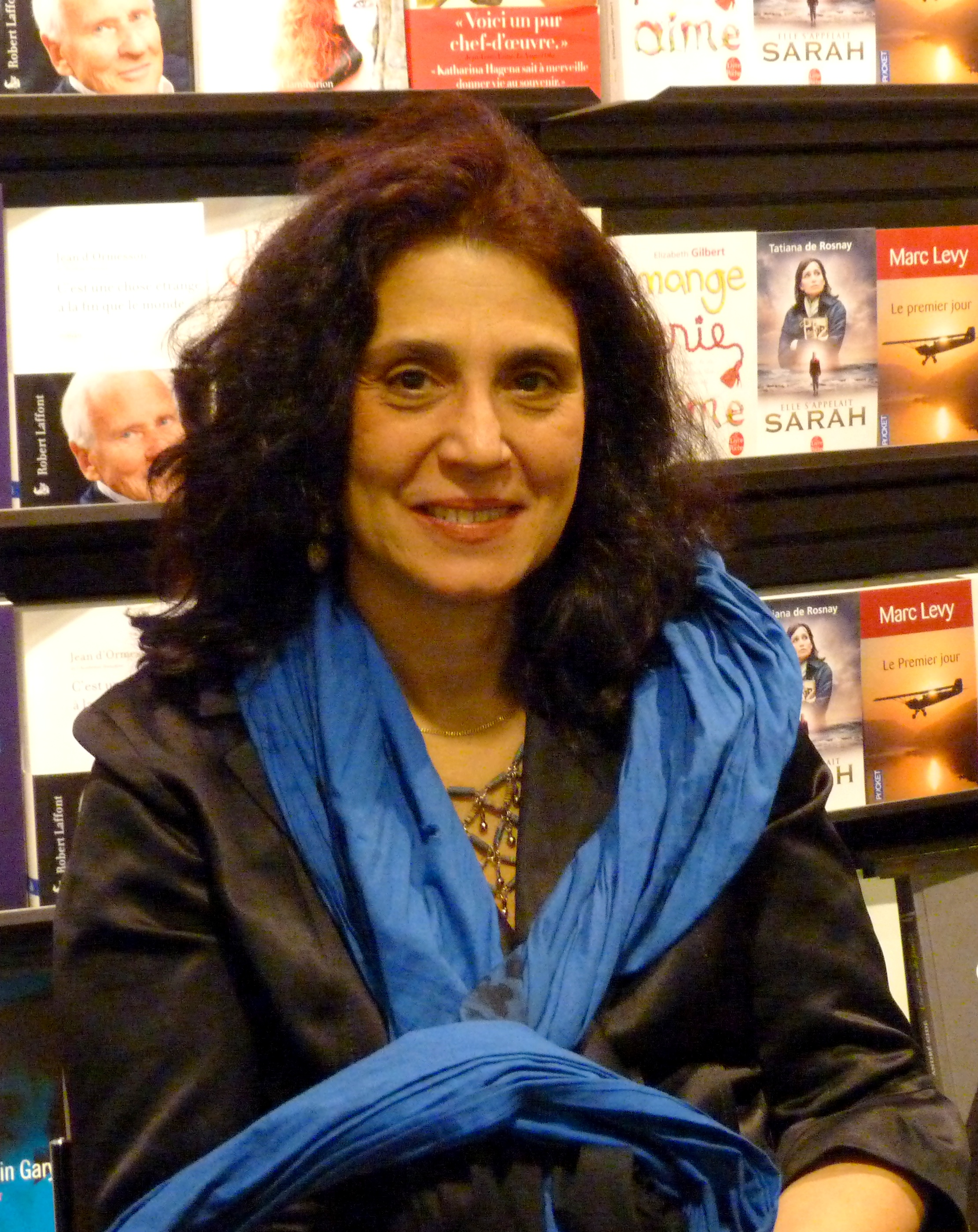
Chochana Boukhobza

- 2021: Boualem Sansal, Abraham ou La cinquième Alliance
- 2020: Mahi Binebine, Rue du pardon
- 2019: Jérôme Ferrari, À son image
- 2018: Kamel Daoud, Zabor ou Les psaumes
- 2017: Metin Arditi, L'Enfant qui mesurait le monde
- 2016: Teresa Cremisi, La triomphante
- 2015: Valérie Zenatti, Jacob, Jacob
- 2014: Gérard de Cortanze, L’an prochain à Grenade (Albin Michel)
- 2013: Wajdi Mouawad, Anima
- 2012: Jean-Noël Pancrazi, La Montagne
- 2011: Pierre Assouline, Les vies de Job
- 2010: Dominique Baudis, Les Amants de Gibraltar (Grasset)
- 2009: Alexandre Najjar, Phenicia (Plon)
- 2008: Louis Gardel, La baie d'Alger (Seuil)
- 2007: Emile Brami, Le manteau de la Vierge (Fayard)
- 2006: Michel del Castillo, Dictionnaire amoureux de l'Espagne (Plon)
- 2005: Jean-Pierre Vernant, La Traversée des frontières (Seuil)
- 2004: Amin Maalouf, Origines (Grasset)
- 2003: François Sureau, Les Alexandrins (Gallimard)
- 2002: Jean-Paul Mari, Il faut abattre la lune (Nil)
- 2001: Edmonde Charles-Roux, L'Homme de Marseille (Grasset)
- 2000: Albert Cossery, Les Couleurs de l'infamie (Joëlle)
- 1999: Jean Daniel, Avec le temps (Grasset)
- 1998: Alain Nadaud, Auguste fulminant (Grasset)
- 1997: Jean-Christophe Rufin, L'Abyssin (Gallimard)
- 1996: Hector Bianciotti, Le Pas si lent de l'amour (Grasset)
- 1995: André Chouraqui, Moïse (Le Rocher)
- 1994: Tahar Ben Jelloun, L'Homme rompu (Seuil)
- 1993: Jean Thuillier, Campo morto (José Corti)
- 1992: Robert Solé, Le tarbouche (Seuil)
- 1991: Tahar Djaout, Les vigiles (Seuil)
- 1990: Philippe Le Guillou, La rumeur du soleil (Gallimard)
- 1989: Jules Roy, Mémoires barbares (Albin Michel)
- 1988: Dominique Fernandez, Le radeau de la Gorgone (Grasset)
- 1987: François Fontaine, Blandine de Lyon (Julliard)
- 1986: Chochana Boukhobza, Un été à Jérusalem (Balland)
- 1985: Nicolas Saudray, La maison des prophètes (Seuil)

=== Prix Méditerranée Étranger ===
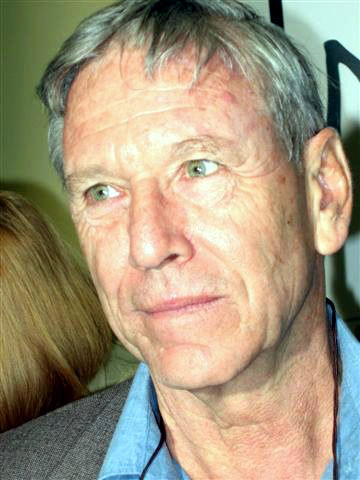
Amos Oz

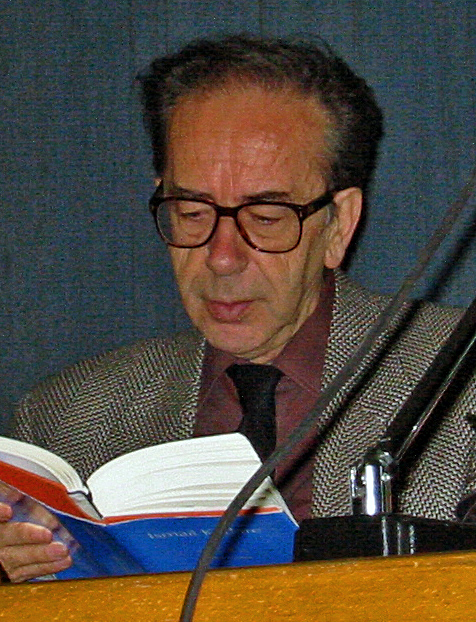
Ismail Kadare

- 2021: Alessio Forgione, Napoli mon amour
- 2020: Giosuè Calaciura, Borgo vecchio
- 2019: Marco Balzano, Je reste ici
- 2018: Daniel Mendelsohn, Une odyssée, Un père, un fils, une épopée, traduit par Clothilde Meyer et Isabelle D. Taudière.
- 2017: Ersi Sotiropoulos, Ce qui reste de la nuit
- 2016: Lluís Llach, Les yeux fardés.
- 2015: Milena Agus and Luciana Castellina, Prends garde
- 2014: Javier Cercas, Les lois de la Frontière, Actes Sud
- 2013: Nedim Gürsel, L'ange rouge
- 2012: Antonio Muñoz Molina, Dans la grande nuit des temps
- 2011: Dimitris Stefanakis, Jours d'Alexandrie
- 2010: Amos Oz, Scéne de Vies Villageoises (Éditions Gallimard)
- 2009: Almudena Grandes, Le Coeur Glacé (Lattès)
- 2008: Sandro Veronesi, Chaos Calme (Grasset)
- 2007: Claudio Magris, À l’Aveugle (Gallimard)
- 2006: Orhan Pamuk, Neige (Gallimard)
- 2005: Antonio Tabucchi, Tristano meurt (Gallimard)
- 2004: Jaume Cabre, Sa Seigneurie (Christian Bourgois)
- 2003: Baltasar Porcel, Cabrera, ou l’Empereur des morts (Actes Sud)
- 2002: Umberto Eco, Baudolino (Grasset)
- 2001: Arturo Perez-Reverte, Le Cimetière des bateaux sans nom (Seuil)
- 2000: Yoram Kaniuk, Il commanda l’Exodus (Fayard)
- 1999: Pietro Citati, La Lumière de la nuit (Gallimard)
- 1998: Boutros Boutros-Ghali, Le Chemin de Jérusalem (Fayard)
- 1997: Besnik Mustafaj, Le Tambour de papier (Actes Sud)
- 1996: Yashar Kemal, La Voix du sang (Gallimard)
- 1995: Adonis, Soleils Seconds (Mercure de France)
- 1994: Juan Goytisolo, Barzak (Gallimard)
- 1993: Ismail Kadare, La Pyramide (Éditions Fayard)
- 1992: Luis Landero, Les Jeux tardifs de l’âge mur (Éditions Gallimard)
