= Luciano Foà =

Italian writer (1938–2023)

- Born: 2 January 1915; Milan, Italy
- Died: 25 January 2005 (aged 90); Milan, Italy
- Occupations: Publisher, translator, founder of Adelphi Edizioni

Luciano Foà was an Italian translator and publisher, founder of Adelphi Edizioni. Throughout his life-long career, he worked for his father at L'Agenzia letteraria internazionale (ALI), collaborated with la Nuove Edizioni Ivrea, served as a director at Einaudi for over 10 years, and founded his own publishing house, Adelphi, in 1962.

== Early life ==
Luciano Foà was born into a family of Italian Jews. Back in 1898 his father Augusto Foà, aged only 21, founded the first agency to handle the rights of foreign authors in Italy: L'Agenzia letteraria internazionale (ALI). A self-taught translator from English, German and French, he considered translation to be ‘one of the most powerful creative acts’. He was collaborating with literary agents across all Europe, in Italy he represented such authors as Huxley, Kipling, Joyce, Kafka, Conan Doyle, Camus, and many more. Though he never made a fortune, he became an important figure in the world of literature.

== Career ==
Luciano Foà entered the publishing market aged only 18, working for ALI as a literary agent.

In 1937, Luciano Foà met Roberto Bazlen, who became a lifelong friend and had a profound influence on Foà. Bazlen made him get to know Adriano Olivetti who was planning to open a new publishing house la Nuove Edizioni Ivrea. Foà joined the project and worked for Olivetti in 1941–1943. Sent by Olivetti, Foà often travelled to Switzerland searching for specific books, or to establish contacts with editors. On one of these trips, he got to know Carl Jung, on another occasion, he met Allen Dulles.

In 1943, following the German occupation of the Italian peninsula, the family was forced to flee. Augusto Foà didn't survive the escape attempts, he was buried in the Jewish Cemetery in Padova. In the end, Luciano Foà managed to escape to Switzerland. Foà was first interned in a labor camp and later granted parole in Geneva. There he met many other Jewish intellectuals and anti-fascists, with whom he began to consider new publishing ventures. Foà became close friends with Alberto Zevi, who was also Jewish and an anti-fascist persecuted by the regime. Foà returned to Italy after the war and took an official position at ALI.

In 1945, Foà translated Ernest Hemingway’s For Whom the Bell Tolls which was published in serial form in Vittorini's magazine Politecnico. As recalled by his friend Giuseppe Marcenaro, Foà never aspired to become a writer himself, he only tried one and left the attempt after one page.

For ten years, since 1951, he had been running the Einaudi. As recalled by his daughter Anna Foà, in these ten years the families of Einaudi and Foà were practically inseparable and spent dinners, vacations and holidays together. According to Primo Levi, it was Foà who played a decisive role in the publication of If This Is a Man. His wife influenced the decision to publish The Diary of Anne Frank as she had received a copy of the translation from Giulio Einaudi and recommended the book to be published.

Foà's legacy of ten years of work in Einauli includes some of the most important books in world culture, published for the first time in Italy: Siddhartha by Hermann Hesse, The Joke by Milan Kundera, Antic Hay by Aldous Huxley, and many more.

In 1951, when Foà decided to accept a position at Einaudi, he did not sever all ties with his father's company; instead, he entered into a gentlemen's agreement with Erich Linder — which was never formally documented but was always honored by both parties — and retained a one-third stake in the agency. Though Foà never received a share of the profits when ALI, under Linder's leadership, began to turn a profit, he still had a stable income which allowed him to safely get through lean periods in Einaudi and, later, in Adelphi.

In 1947, Foà joined the Italian Communist Party, but he left in 1956 following the invasion of Hungary by the USSR.

=== Adelphi ===
Throughout his ten years at Ainaudi, Foà had built up a list of authors and books that he wanted to publish but was unable to do so under the Turin-based publishing house's imprint. In 1961, Foà left his post at Einaudi and together with three close friends Roberto Bazlen, Alberto Zevi, and Roberto Olivetti, finally realized his long-held dream: he founded the Adelphi Edizioni publishing house. Despite the split, Einaudi and Foà remained close friends.

The experience and network of contacts built up over the previous years became the foundation of the new publishing house. Foà saw the mission of Adelphi in publishing books of high cultural value that had been overlooked by everyone else. As put by his granddaughter Benedetta Grasso, through the catalogue of Adelphi, he dreamed ‘to recreate the atmosphere of a Vienna's cafe in Italy’.

The list of the first publications by Adelphi includes the classics such as Daniel Defoe, Gottfried Keller, Niccolò Tommaseo, Georg Büchner, Carlo Dossi, Niccolò Machiavelli, Stendahl. They were followed by George Gurdjieff, Georg Groddeck, René Daumal, and many more.

For 35 years, Foà combined his work as a publisher with that of a translator and editor. Under the pen name Luciano Fabbri, he translated at least two books by Joseph Roth, as well as titles by Konrad Lorenz, Hoffmansthal, Robert Walser, and Johann Wolfgang von Goethe.

== Death and legacy ==
Foà died at the age of ninety on January 26, 2005, in Milan. In 2006, his personal library of 8684 volumes was donated to Fondazione Arnoldo e Alberto Mondadori where it is open for public access.
