= Nicolas Saudray =

French novelist

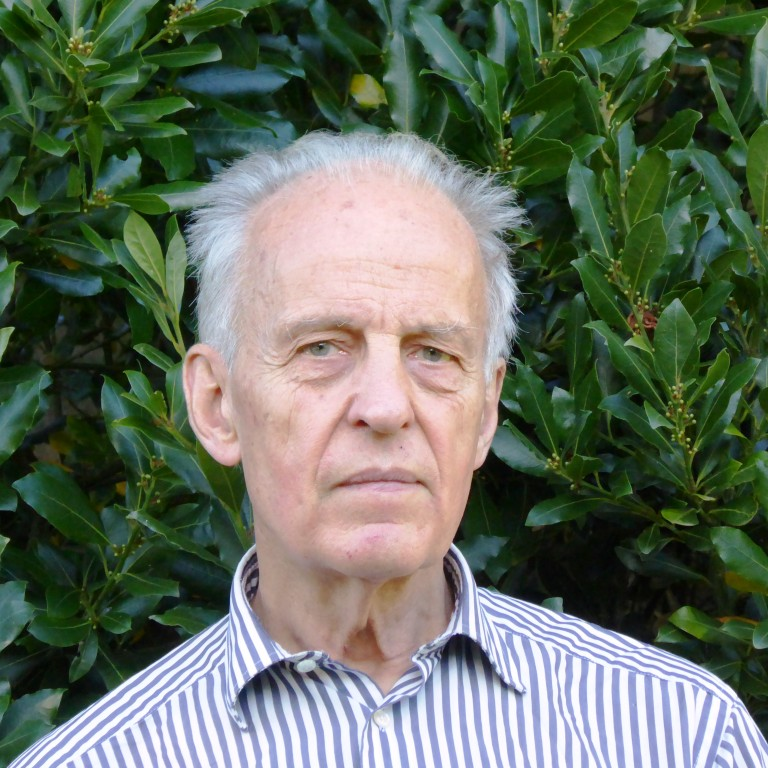
Nicolas Saudray in 2017

Nicolas Saudray (born 1942) is a French novelist. Born in Normandy, he worked in the French civil service as an economist. He was also an administrator of the Bibliothèque nationale de France.

He is best known for his novel La maison des prophètes which won the Prix Méditerranée as well as the Prix Lange from the Académie française. It was translated into English under the title The House of the Prophets.
