= Marco Balzano =

Italian writer

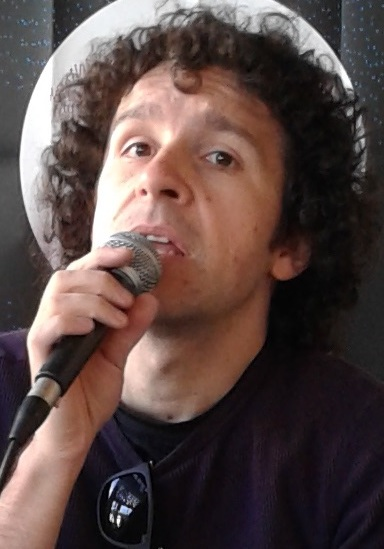
Marco Balzano - 2019

Marco Balzano (born 1978) is an Italian writer. He was born in Milan, where he now works as a teacher of literature in a high school.

Balzano has written several acclaimed novels:

- Il figlio del figlio, which won the Premio Corrado Alvaro for debut novel
- Pronti a tutte le partenze, winner of the Premio Flaiano
- L'ultimo arrivato, winner of the Premio Campiello

His latest novel Resto qui (I stay here) has garnered widespread critical praise and was nominated for or won numerous prizes.

== Laurels won by Resto qui ==
- Winner of the Premio letterario Elba
- Winner of the Premio Mario Rigoni Stern
- Winner of the Premio Bagutta
- Winner of the Premio Asti d'Appello
- Winner of the Prix Mediterranee
- Nominated for the Premio Strega
- Shortlisted for the Prix Femina
- Shortlisted for the Prix du roman FNAC

His work has been translated into German, French, Dutch, Icelandic and English.
