= Émile Brami =

French writer (born 1950)

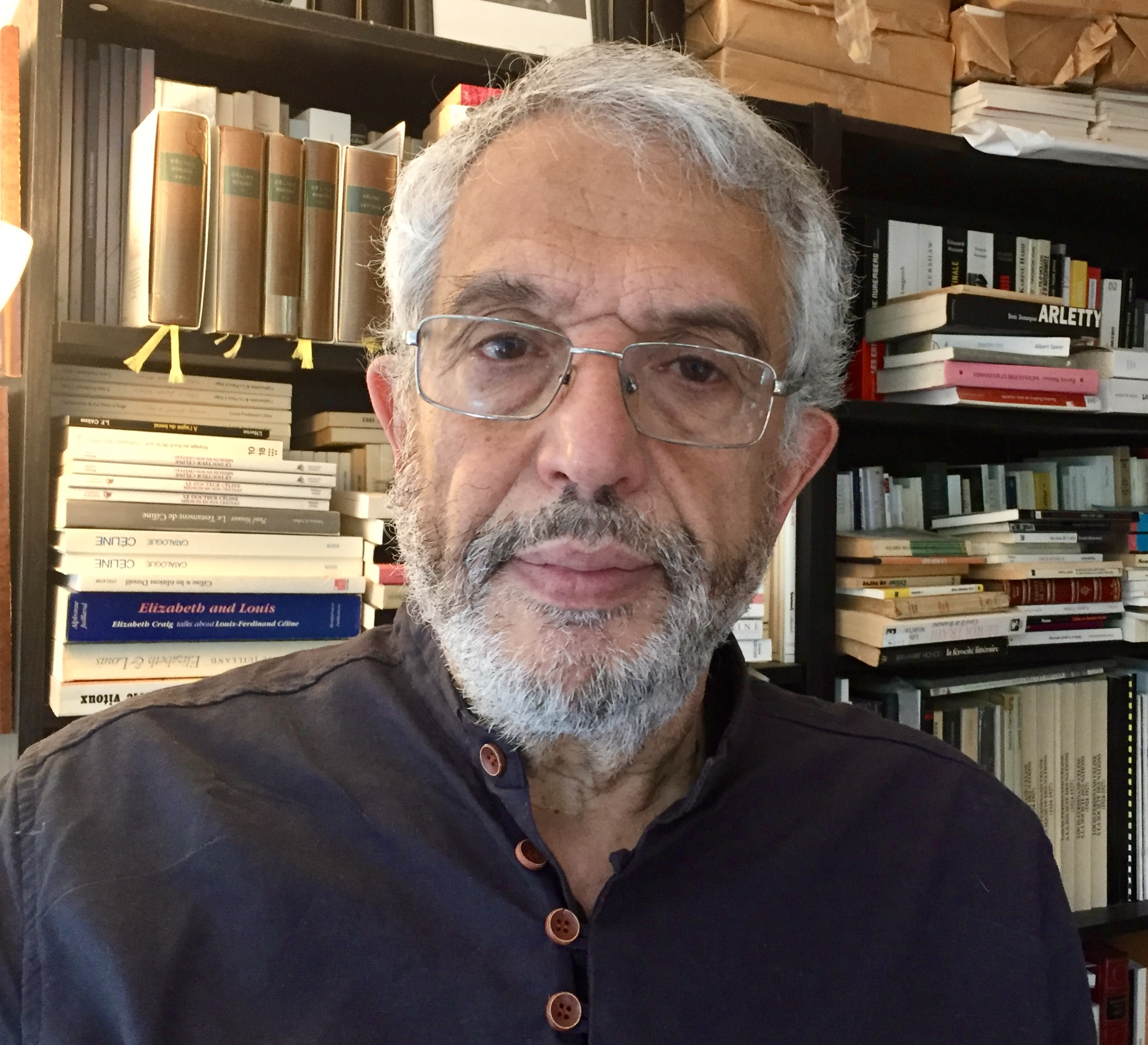
Émile Brami

Émile Brami (born 19 April 1950) is a French writer and bookseller of Tunisian origin. He was born in Jendouba, formerly known as Souk El Arba, in Tunisia. He moved to France in 1964 and settled in Paris. He is a specialist on Louis-Ferdinand Celine, the 20th-century writer, and published a biography in 2003.

Brami established and ran a bookshop "D'un livre l'autre" in Paris that deals mainly with Celine. He is of Jewish and Berber origin. His works often refer back to his childhood and his Tunisian Jewish background. In 2001, he won the Prix Bernard Palissy for his first novel Histoire de la Poupee. He also won the Prix Mediterranee for his novel Le Manteau de la vierge in 2007.

== Works ==
=== Novels ===
- Histoire de la poupée, Éditions Écriture, 2000 (prix Bernard Palissy du premier roman 2001)
- Art brut, Éditions Écriture, 2001 (Attention talent de la Fnac décembre 2001 et Prix Lucioles des lecteurs 2001)
- Le Manteau de la vierge, Fayard, 2006 (Prix Méditerranée 2007)
- Amis de la poésie, Fayard, 2008
- Émile l'Africain, Fayard, 2008

=== Others ===
- Rigor mortis, avec six photographies de Xavier Lambours, Éditions Écriture, 2002
- Céline: je ne suis pas assez méchant pour me donner en exemple, Éditions Écriture, 2003
- Céline, Hergé et l'affaire Haddock, Éditions Écriture, 2004
- Céline vivant (DVD), Éditions montparnasse, 2007
- Le Corps qui souffre, édition privée tirée à 200 exemplaires numérotés et signés par l'auteur
