= Dimitris Stefanakis =

Greek novelist

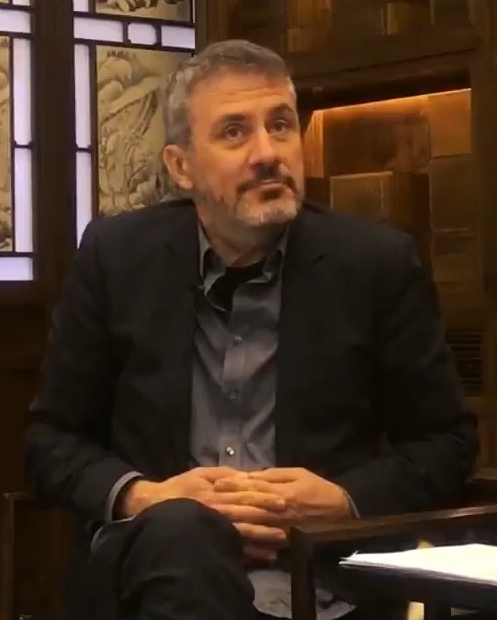
- Born: 1961 (age 64–65); Kea, Greece
- Education: Athens University
- Occupations: Writer; translator
- Writing career
- Language: Greek
- Notable awards: Prix Méditerranée Étranger; 2011 Days of Alexandria
- Website: dimitrisstefanakis.gr

Dimitris Stefanakis (born 1961) is a Greek novelist. He was born on island of Kea, and studied law at Athens University. He has written several novels including Film Noir and Days of Alexandria. The latter won the Prix Mediterranee in 2011 and has been translated into both French and Spanish.

Stefanakis has also translated the works of several English-language authors into Greek, including Saul Bellow, John Updike, Margaret Atwood, and E.M. Forster.
