= Alexandre Najjar =

Lebanese novelist and literary critic (born 1967)

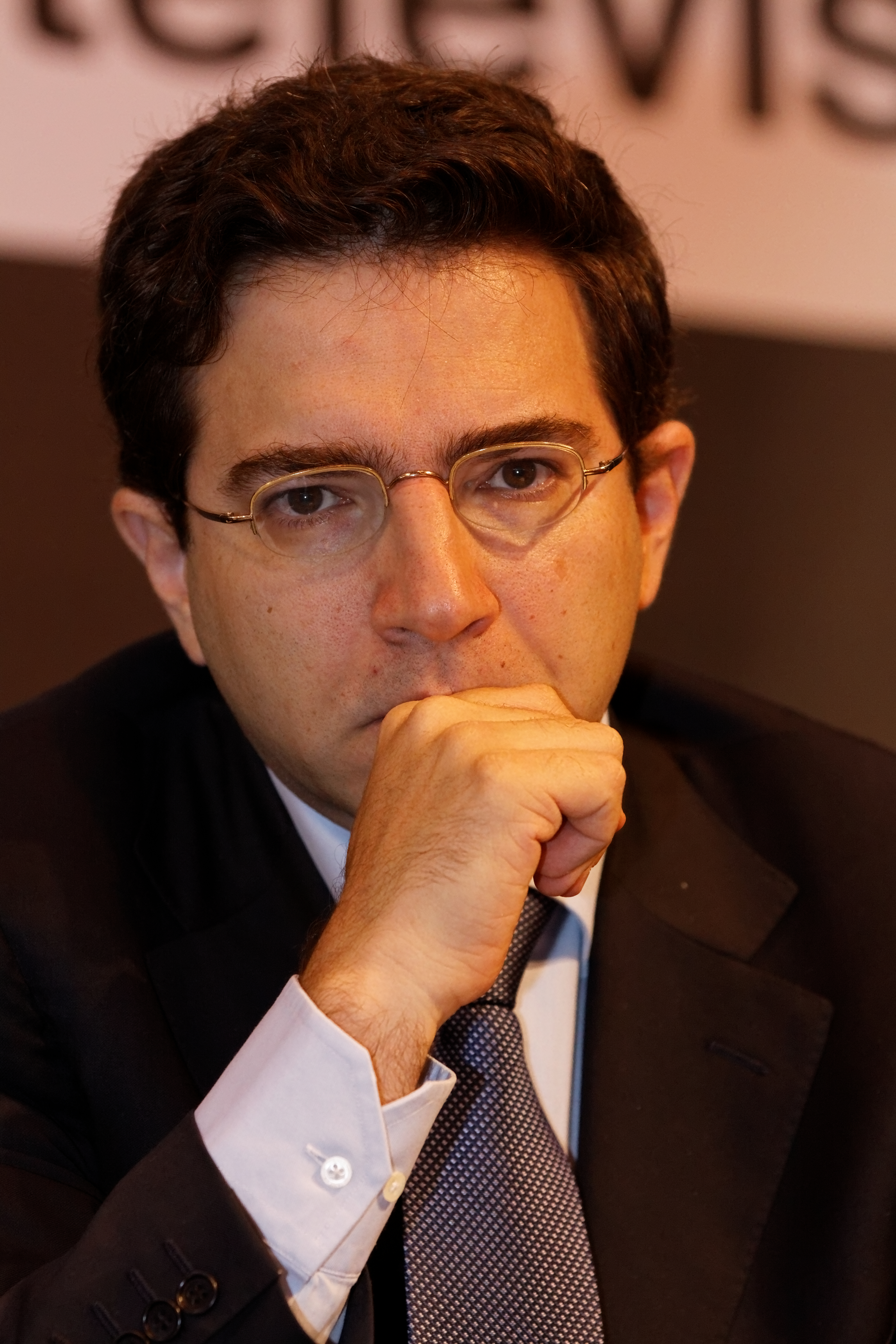
Alexandre Najjar

Alexandre Najjar (born February 5, 1967) is a Lebanese and French writer, lawyer and literary critic. He was born in Beirut and studied at Panthéon-Assas University and University of Paris 1 Pantheon-Sorbonne. He holds a Doctorate in Business administration and is specialized in banking and finance law. He is the author of more than 30 books translated into more than 12 languages. In addition to poetry and novels, he has written non-fiction works like the biography of Khalil Gibran, the author of The Prophet, a book about the 1936 Summer Olympic Games in Nazi Germany (Berlin 36) and a book about the Arab Spring (Anatomie d'un tyran).

Najjar is also a columnist and critic for L'Orient littéraire, the literary supplement of the Lebanese French-language daily L'Orient-Le Jour. He lives in Paris and Beirut. In 2009, he received the Prix Mediterranee for his book Phenicia and a distinction from the French Academy (L'Académie française), in addition to numerous Lebanese and international awards. He has given lectures in Paris, Poitiers, Perpignan, Marseille, Washington, New York, Mexico, Stockholm, Goteborg, Ireland, Italy, Moscow, Frankfurt, Berlin, Leipzig, Switzerland, United Arab Emirates and other countries/cities.

== Published works ==
Najjar's works have been translated into more than 12 languages :

"Le Syndrome de Beyrouth", Plon, 2021.

"Harry et Franz ", Plon, 2018.

"Mimosa ", Les Escales, 2017.

"Dictionnaire amoureux du Liban", Plon, 2014.

"Les Anges de Millesgarden", Gallimard, 2013.

"Kadicha", novel, Plon, September 2011.

"Anatomie d'un tyran : Mouammar Kadhafi", Actes Sud/L'orient des livres, 2011.

"Sur les traces de Gibran", essay, Dergham, 2011.

"Un goût d'éternité", poems, Dergham, 2011.

"L'enfant terrible", biography, ed. L'Orient-Le Jour, 2010.

"Haïti, suivi de : Aller simple pour la mort", poems, Dergham, 2010.

Berlin 36, a novel that tells the story of African American runner Jesse Owens, particularly during the 1936 Summer Olympics in Berlin, Plon (publisher), 2010.

"Pour la francophonie", essay, Dar An-Nahar, 2008.

"Un amour infini", poems, Dergham, 2008.

Phénicia, novel, Plon, 2008 (ISBN 2-259-20384-1). Prix Méditerranée 2009;Pocket n°14029.

Le Silence du ténor, Plon, 2006 (ISBN 2-259-20383-3); Ed. La Table ronde, n°276. available in English under the title : The School of War (Telegram).

Awraq Joubrania, Dar an-Nahar, Beirut, 2006 (in Arabic)

La Passion de lire, Librairie Antoine, 2005

Saint Jean-Baptiste, biography, Pygmalion, 2005 (ISBN 2-85704-854-8)

Le Roman de Beyrouth, novel, Plon, 2005 (ISBN 2-266-16499-6); Pocket, n°13070.

Le Mousquetaire, Zo d'Axa (1864–1930), biography, Balland, 2004, (ISBN 2-7158-1479-8)

De Gaulle et le Liban, essay, II vol., Ed. Terre du Liban :

1. Vers l'Orient compliqué (1929–1931), 2002
2. De la guerre à l'Indépendance (1941–1943), 2004

Khalil Gibran, biography, Pygmalion, 2002 (ISBN 2-85704-777-0); J'ai Lu n°7841. Available in English (Telegram).

Lady Virus, thriller, Balland, 2002 (ISBN 2-253-08793-9), and Livre de Poche.

Le Crapaud, play, FMA, 2001 -

Le Procureur de l'Empire, Ernest Pinard (1822–1909), biography, Balland, 2001 (ISBN 2-7158-1350-3), published by La Table ronde under the title : "Le Censeur de Baudelaire" (2010).

Khiam, poems, Dar An-Nahar, 2000.

Athina, novel, Grasset, 2000.

L'école de la guerre, Balland, 1999 (ISBN 2-7103-2844-5); La Table ronde, n°242. Available in English under the title : The School of war (Telegram).

L'Astronome, novel, Grasset, 1997

Les Exilés du Caucase, novel, Grasset, 1995 (ISBN 2-246-50121-0)

Pérennité de la littérature libanaise d'expression française, essay, éd. Anthologie,1993

Comme un aigle en dérive, short stories, Publisud, 1993

La honte du survivant, short stories, Naaman, 1989

À quoi rêvent les statues?, poems, éd. Anthologie,1989

Law books:

- La garantie à première demande, Bruylant-LGDJ-Delta, 2010. (First demand guarantee)
- L'administration de la société anonyme libanaise, Bruylant-LGDJ-Delta, 1998, 2e éd. 2011. (The management of the Lebanese joint-stock company).

== Awards, Prizes and Distinctions ==
- Grand Prix de la Francophonie of the French Academy (2020)
- 2020 French Renaissance Gold Medal for his entire work
- Prize of the Salon du livre de Chaumont 2019 for Harry and Franz
- Spirituality Award today 2019 for Harry and Franz
- Medal of the National Association of Members of the National Order of Merit in 2017
- Officer in the National Order of Cedar - LEBANON (2014)
- Kahlil Gibran Prize (2012)
- Commander of the Royal Order of Merit - SPAIN (2011)
- Médaille de la Ville de Poitiers (2011)
- Officer in the Order of "Arts et Lettres " - FRANCE (2010)
- Lauréat du Prix du roman libanais (2010)
- Médaille d'argent de la Ville de Rambouillet (2009)
- Médaille d'or de la Ville de Perpignan (2009)
- Prix Hervé Deluen de l'Académie française (2009)
- Prix Méditerranée (2009)
- Prix Saïd Akl (mars 2003)
- "Writer of the year 2000" (Lebanon)
- Médaille de l'Union des Editeurs Libanais (2000)
- Lauréat d'une médaille d'argent aux IIIe jeux de la Francophonie
- Prix France-Liban (1999)
- Prix Amsterdam (1999)
- Prix Ignace Maroun (1997)
- Lauréat du Prix de l'Asie (1996)
- Lauréat du Prix du Palais littéraire (1994)
- Lauréat du Premier Prix de Poésie de la Ville de Paris (1990)
- Lauréat de la Médaille d'argent de la Ville de Paris (1990)
- Lauréat de la Médaille d'or de la Mairie de Paris (XIVe) (1990)
- Lauréat de la première Bourse de l'Ecrivain de la Fondation Hachette (1990)
