= Jean Thuillier =

French novelist and physician

Jean Thuillier (12 October 1921 – 22 August 2017) was a French novelist and medical doctor. He wrote a number of books, and won the Prix Littré and the Prix Méditerranée among others. Thuillier died in August 2017 at the age of 95.

== Selected works ==
- Franz Anton Mesmer ou l’Extase magnétique (Phébus - 2004)
- Kim En Joong Peintre de lumière (Le Cerf - 2004)
- Les dix ans qui ont changé la folie (Robert Laffont - 1981)
- Les dix ans qui ont changé la folie, la dépression et l'angoisse (Erès - 2003)
- Dictionnaire des médicaments et leur bon usage (Robert Laffont - 1999)
- La Vierge du Cap (Rivages - 1996)
- Le Rêve de Charlus (Le Rocher - 1995)
- Monsieur Charcot de la Salpêtrière (Robert Laffont - 1993) (Prix Clio et Emile Roux d'Histoire 1993)
- Campo Morto (José Corti - 1992) (Prix Méditerranée 1993)
- La Révolution des tranquilisants (Renaudot - 1988)
- La folie. histoire et dictionnaire (Robert Laffond - 1992)
- Le paria du Danube (Balland - 1884) (Prix Littré 1984)
