= Bologna University Press =

Publisher of the University of Bologna

Fondazione Bologna University Press (BUP) is an associate publisher of the University of Bologna in Italy.

The university is situated in the center of Bologna, where it was established in 1998 as an Italian University Press which was created as a limited company and includes private investors among its owners.

The Fondazione Bologna University Press is driven by corporate-editorial policies as well as three government bodies. These bodies include: the board of directors whom gather the representatives and shareholders of BUP; the Board of Auditors, who are tasked with BUP's financial management; and the Scientific Committee, that analyzes and recommends Bologna University Press' publications to third-parties.

== History ==
Bologna University Press was established in 1998 as an editorial brand of the University of Bologna. It produces roughly 90 titles per year, and, as of September 2014, holds a catalogue of about 900 titles that includes art and academic texts, narrative literature, history and photography books, illustrated texts for children, and translations from foreign languages. In 2021, Bologna University Press changed its business name in Fondazione Bologna University Press.

== Collaborations ==
Bologna University Press collaborates with cultural representatives of the Emilia-Romagna region, such as:

- L'Istituto per i Beni Artistici Culturali e Naturali (The Institute for Artistical, Cultural and Natural Heritage – IBACN)
- Sistema Museale GENUS BONONIAE (Museal Sistem GENUS BONONIAE)
- l'Istituto per la Storia di Bologna (The Institute for the History of Bologna)
- l'Istituto per la Storia dell'Università di Bologna (The Institute for the History of the University of Bologna)

Bologna University Press also cooperates with national institutions, such as:

- ICCD – Istituto Centrale per il Catalogo e la Documentazione (Central Institute for Catalogue and Documentation)
- CMCC – Centro Euro-Mediterraneo sui Cambiamenti Climatici (Euro-Mediterranean Center for Climate Change)
- INGV Istituto Nazionale di Geofisica e Vulcanologia (National Institute of Geophysics and Volcanology)
- Il Museo Civico di Bolzano (The Bolzano Civic Museum)

Since 2006, Bologna University Press has been publishing the books of individuals who have received the Inedited Italian Narrative biennial Award "Arcangela Todaro-Faranda"- in 2014, in occasion of tenth death' anniversary of professor Raffaele Spongano, the foundation creator, it was published a collection of all the contest judges' relations and winners of various editions' opinions; in 2009, Bologna University Press became the editor of Illustrator’s Annual, the official catalogue of Bologna Children's Book Fair's illustrators.

== Authors ==
A few authors who have published with Bologna University Press include:

- Vincenzo Balzani
- Renato Barilli
- Ovidio Capitani
- Andrea Emiliani
- Vittorio Emiliani
- Antonio Faeti
- Franco La Polla
- Emilio Pasquini
- Gianfranco Pasquino
- Renato Zangheri

== Illustrators ==
Some individuals who have illustrated volumes for Bologna University Press are:

- Grazia Nidasio
- Federico Maggioni
- Gianluigi Toccafondo
- Cinzia Ghigliano

== Awards ==
- National Award of the President of the Republic 2010, given from Accademia dei Lincei for the Class of Moral, Historical and Philological Sciences to This Star of England, by Enrico Gusberti
- Antonella Musu Award 2011, youth section of the Castiglioncello Philosophic Award, to Bergson, la tecnica, la guerra by Caterina Zanfi.
- Sanremo Award – Libro del Mare 2009 as the best popular scientific book about the sea, to Misurare il mare, by Nadia Pinardi.
- Certificate of merit at the Gran Premio Scudo d'Oro 2012, librarian works section, to Imago Universitatis, by Gian Paolo Brizzi.
- Certificate of merit at Prize Cento 2008 to Storia di Re Enzo, with texts by Matteo Marchesini and drawings by Wolfango.
- II place at the Mario Soldati 2012 contest, organized by "Research and Studies Center Mario Pannunzio" in Turin, to Nelle Terre basse, by Mario Pettoello.

== Periodical literature ==
Bologna University Press publishes scientific and cultural journals. These include:

- IBC, a magazine of the Institute for the Artistic, Cultural and Natural Heritage of Emila-Romagna.
- Encyclopaideia, the phenomenology, pedagogy, education journal of the Education Science Department of the Bologna University.
- Giving, a bilingual philanthropy half-yearly journal.
- IUS 17@unibo.it, Materials and Studies of Criminal law, a four-monthly journal realized with the collaboration of the Legal Sciences Department A. Cicu of the University of Bologna.
- Diritto dello Sport, a quarterly journal promoted by Fondazione Carlo Rizzoli per le Scienze Motorie.
- Il Diabete, a quarterly journal wrote in mind for all Diabetologists, with regular updatings about the latest findings and news.
