= Chochana Boukhobza =

Israeli writer

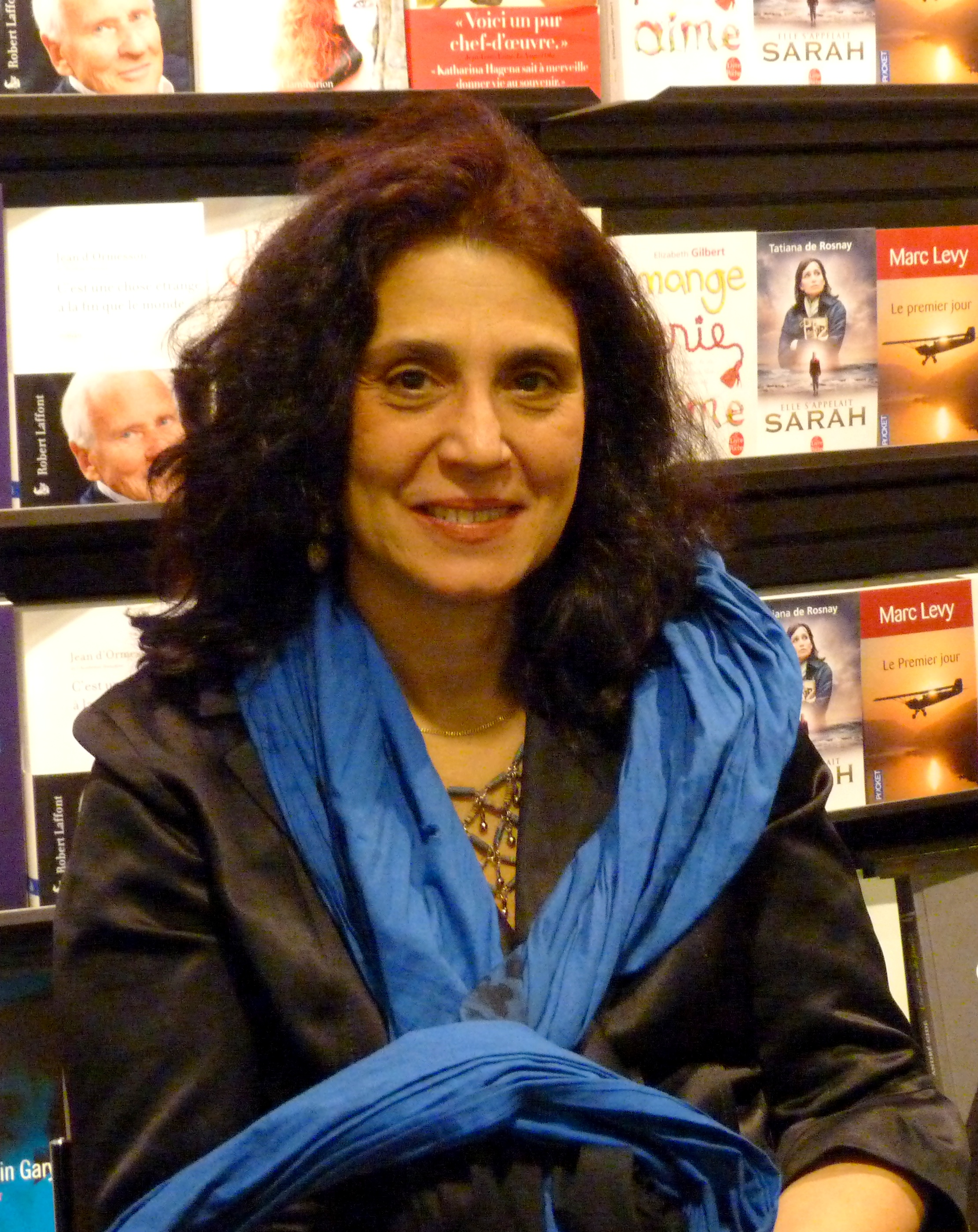
Chochana Boukhobza

Chochana Boukhobza (Hebrew: בוקובזה שושנה, Arabic: شوشانة بوخبزة, Sfax; March 2, 1959, is an Israeli writer of Tunisian-Jewish descent. She was born in Sfax, Tunisia and emigrated to Israel at the age of 17. She studied mathematics in Israel.

She is the author of several novels, the first of which Un été à Jérusalem (A Summer in Jerusalem) won the Prix Mediterranée in 1986. Her second novel Le Cri was a finalist for the 1987 Prix Femina. She has also written several screenplays. In 2005, she co-directed a documentary Un billet aller-retour (A Return Ticket) (Barcelona-Paris Films Productions).

== Major works ==
- Le cri (1987) (The Cry)
- Un Eté à Jérusalem (1988) (A Summer in Jerusalem)
- Bel Canto (1991)
- The Third Day (2012)
- For the Love of the Father (2019)
- Les Femmes d’Auschwitz-Birkenau (2024) (The Women of Auschwitz-Birkenau)
