= Ernesto Ferrero =

Italian writer (1938–2023)

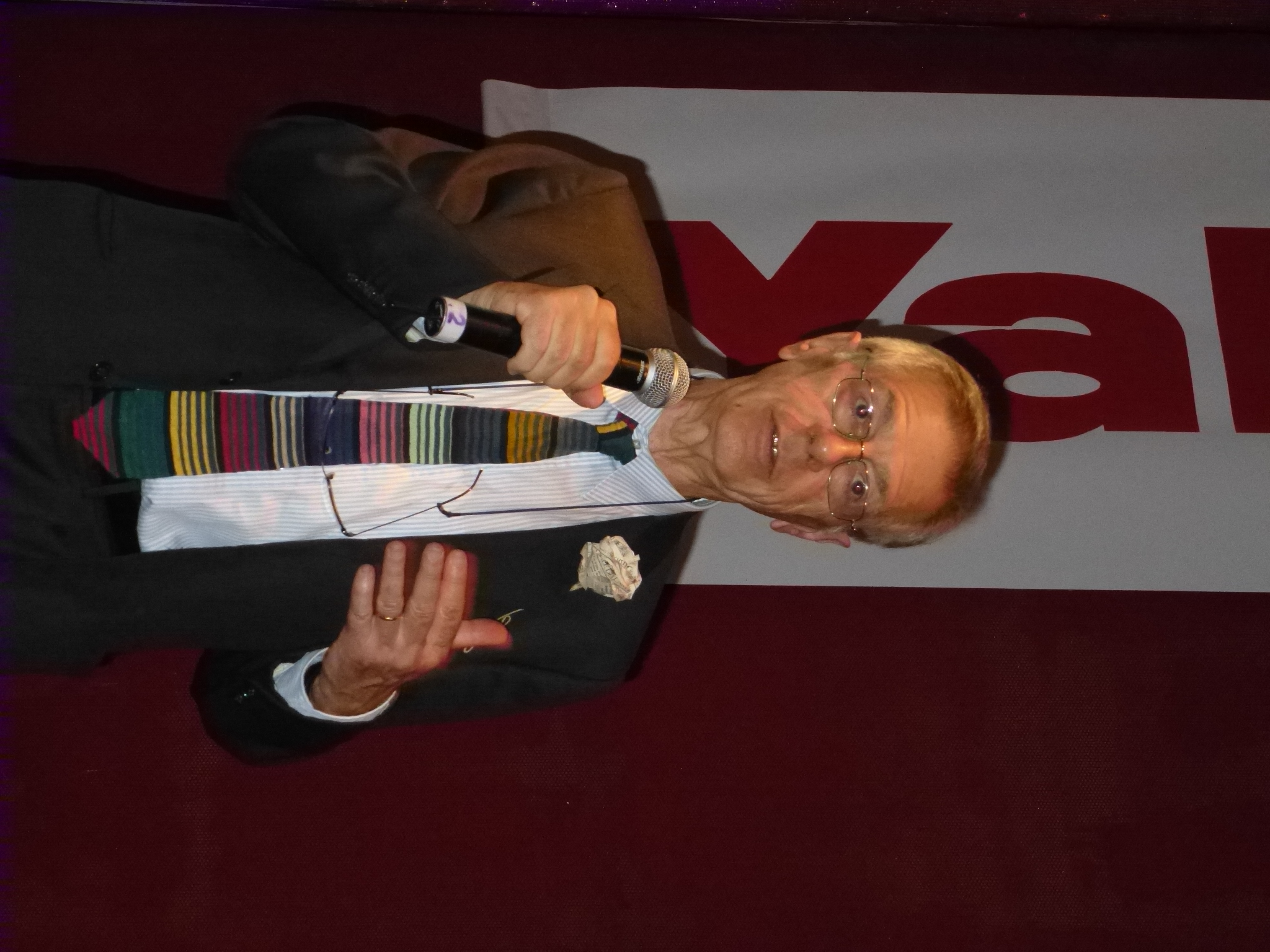
- Born: 6 May 1938; Turin, Italy
- Died: 31 October 2023 (aged 85); Turin, Italy

Ernesto Ferrero (6 May 1938 – 31 October 2023) was an Italian writer, literary critic and translator.

== Life and career ==
Born in Turin, in 1963 Ferrero started his career as a press officer for the Einaudi publishing house. He made his literary debut with a dictionary of Italian slang (I gerghi del male dal ’400 a oggi, 1972), which won the Viareggio Prize for First Work.

Ferrero is best known for the novel N, a reconstruction of Napoleon's stay on Elba through the diary of his librarian; the book was translated in numerous foreign languages, won the Strega Prize and was freely adapted by Paolo Virzì into a film, Napoleon and Me. His 2011 biographical novel about Emilio Salgari Disegnare il vento ("Drawing the Wind") won the Premio Selezione Campiello. His last book was Album di famiglia ("Family album", 2022), a collection of intimate portraits of literary authors.

Ferrero directed the Turin International Book Fair from 1998 to 2016. He translated works of Gustave Flaubert, Louis-Ferdinand Céline and Georges Perec. He also wrote critical essays and collaborated with various newspapers and television programmes. He died on 31 October 2023, at the age of 85.

== Bibliography ==
- Ferrero, Ernesto (2023). Italo. Frontiere Einaudi. Torino: Einaudi. ISBN 978-88-06-26155-9.
- Ferrero, Ernesto (2022). Album di famiglia: maestri del Novecento ritratti dal vivo. Frontiere Einaudi. Torino: Einaudi. ISBN 978-88-06-25798-9.
- Ferrero, Ernesto (2018). Amarcord bianconero. L'arcipelago Einaudi. Torino: Einaudi. ISBN 978-88-06-23935-0.
- Ferrero, Ernesto (2005). I migliori anni della nostra vita. Varia (2 ed.). Milano: Feltrinelli. ISBN 978-88-07-49038-5.
