= Giosuè Calaciura =

Italian journalist

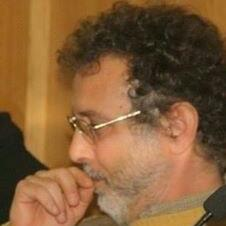
Giosuè Calaciura

Giosuè Calaciura is an Italian writer. He was born in Palermo in 1960. A career journalist, he writes regularly for many daily newspapers and magazines. He also writes for the theatre and radio.

His debut novel Malacarne was published in 1998. Other works include:

- Sgobbo (2002)
- La figlia perduta. La favola dello Slum (2005)
- Urbi et Orbi (2006)
- Bambini e altri animali (short stories, 2013)
- Pantelleria (2016)
- Borgo Vecchio (2017) - Premio Marco Polo Venise 2019, Prix Mediterranée 2020
- Il tram di Natale (2018) - Premio Presidi del Libro “Alessandro Leogrande” 2019
- Io sono Gesù (2021)
- Una notte (2022)

Calaciura lives and works in Rome.

== Biography ==
His father was Palermo journalist Anselmo Calaciura, and his mother, Grazia Cianetti, a poet and teacher. A journalist for L'Ora of Palermo, when the newspaper closed (1992) he opened the restaurant “Le mura dell'Itria,” frequented by many journalists and writers, including Goffredo Fofi.
