= Einaudi (publisher) =

Italian publishing company

Giulio Einaudi Editore
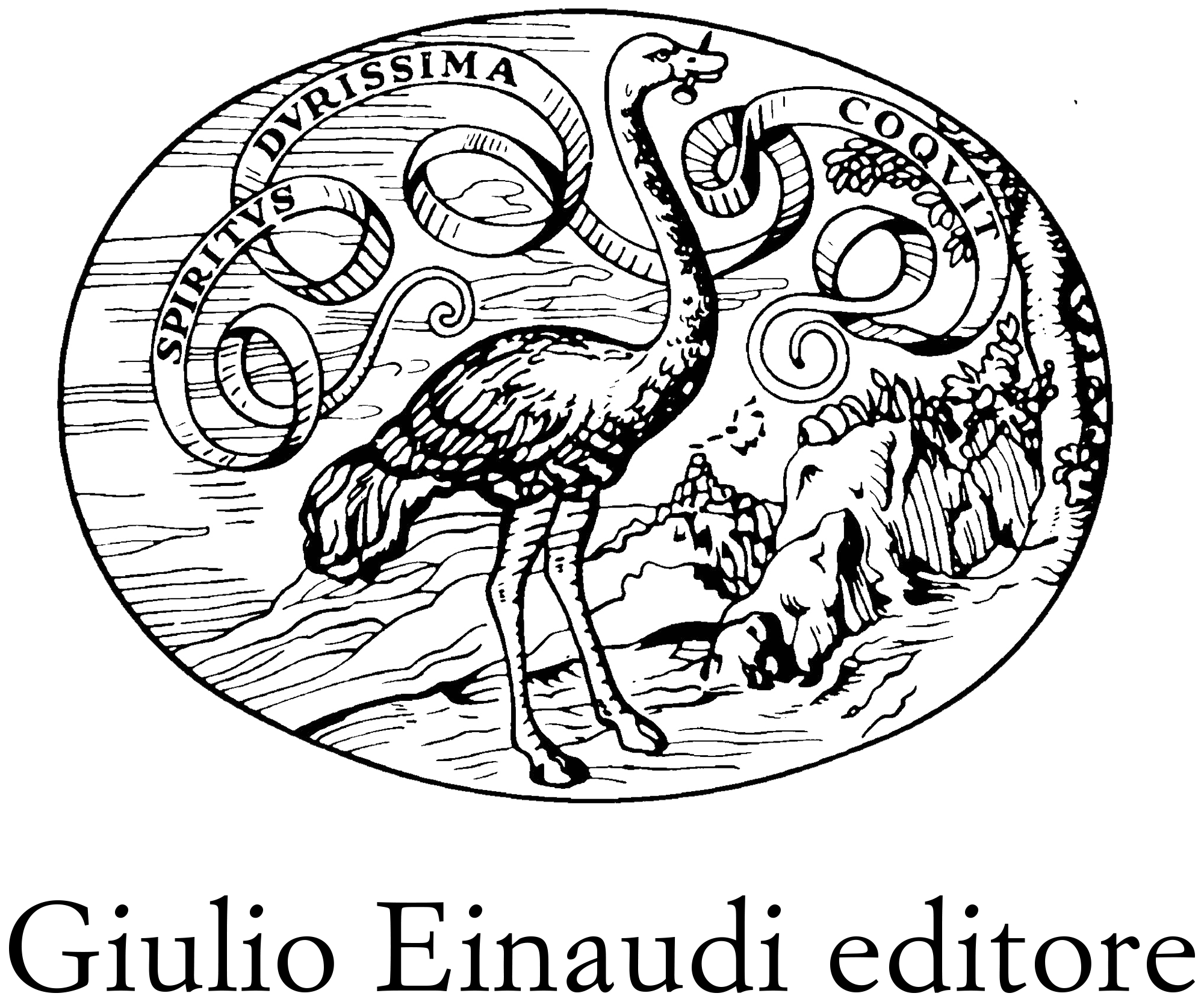
- Trade name: Einaudi
- Industry: Publishing
- Founded: 1933; 93 years ago
- Founders: Giulio Einaudi
- Headquarters: Turin
- Key people: Walter Barberis (incumbent president)
- Website: einaudi.it

Giulio Einaudi Editore (or simply Einaudi) is an Italian publishing house, founded in 1933 by Giulio Einaudi. This publishing house has always actively opposed the fascist regime in Italy and published left-wing and democratic authors. Cesare Pavese and Leone Ginzburg were Einaudi's two main colleagues and collaborators. In the 1950s, Einaudi was run by Luciano Foà, who later founded Adelphi Edizioni. Einaudi Editore played an important role in the spread of knowledge and book publishing in Italy both before and after World War II. It collaborated with outstanding writers and helped many young authors achieve fame. Many of the publisher's book series have become classics of Italian literature. Einaudi was often the first to publish translations of modern foreign authors, making their works accessible to Italian readers.

Following the financial crisis the publishing house faced in the mid-1990s, it became part of the Mondadori Group in 1994.

== History ==
=== Foundation and first years ===
The publishing house was founded in Turin in 1933 by 21-year-old Giulio Einaudi, the son of the future 2nd president of the Italian Republic, and a group of his schoolmates. The headquarters was located on the third floor of Via Arcivescovado, 7, in Turin, in the same building with Antonio Gramsci's L'Ordine Nuovo. This connection is important as it reflects the nature of the new editorial team and its clear opposition stance. At the time Giulio Einaudi studied at the Liceo Classico Massimo d'Azeglio under the famous Italian writer, professor Augusto Monti, who had influenced him greatly and shaped many of his ideas. A bold anti-fascist, Einaudi published books in line with his beliefs: the publisher immediately was perceived as left-leaning and democratic. Einaudi's first publication was "What America Wants?" ("Che cosa vuole l'America?") by Henry Agard Wallace. Still, while Giulio Einaudi was the entrepreneurial driving force among the founders, in the thirties the publisher's editorial course was mostly directed by Leone Ginzburg. A mutual friend and the third key figure in Einaudi publishing house, Cesare Pavese, often served as a mitigator between Einaudi and Ginzburg who debated and fought frequently and sometimes did not talk to each other for days. Other prominent figures of the circle which contributed to the publishing house were Norberto Bobbio, Vittorio Foa, Carlo Levi, Massimo Mila, Luigi Salvatorelli, Giaime Pintor (giornalista 1919), and many more.

The publisher logo, an ostrich, dates back to 1574 when it was for the first time published in Monsignor Paolo Giovio's book Dialogo delle imprese militari et amorose. The symbol was later chosen as a logo of La Cultura magazine, edited by Giulio Einaudi before it was shut by the fascists in 1935. The emblem was accompanied by the motto "Spiritus durissima coquit", signifying that "a valiant heart has the strength to endure any grave injury".

For being openly opposed to the regime, Giulio Einaudi, along with many of his friends and colleagues, was arrested in 1935. After two months in a police detention centre, he was sentenced to three years in confino (an internal concentration camp). In 1943, he ran to Switzerland. In March and April 1943, the publishing house's offices were bombed and both times Pavese had to recover papers from under the debris. In 1944, Einaudi joined the resistance and fought for the liberation of Italy as a partisan. Ginzburg died from torture in 1944 in Roman prison Regina Coeli.

=== After WWII ===
After the liberation of Italy, the publishing house returned to work. It was characterised by a liberal, flat structure: every Wednesday, editorial meetings were held to resolve day-to-day issues and discuss general editorial policy. In that period, Einaudi had three offices: one in Milan, headed by Elio Vittorini, one in Turin, headed briefly by Massimo Mila (later replaced by Cesare Pavese), and third – in Rome, guided also by Pavese. Of all the Italian publishing houses of the time, Einaudi was the only one that did not compromise itself by collaborating with the fascist regime.

Since the late 1940s, Einaudi Editore had collaborated with Elio Vittorini, Italo Calvino, Luciano Foà, Giulio Bollati. In 1945, Vittorini launched Il Politecnico, a popular science magazine aimed at the general public. The publication was edited by the artist Albe Steiner and stood out for its ultra-modern design. The magazine became a huge success, however, Einaudi had to cease publication two years later, following a row between Palmiro Togliatti and Vittorini, who refused to 'play the pipe of revolution'.

From 1951 onward, the publishing house was run by Luciano Foà (he had joined back in 1943 and after the death of Pavese became the director), but Giulio Einaudi remained its director and it was he who determined editorial policy. During this period, they published In Search of Lost Time by Marcel Proust and many other translations of the literature that defined the 20th century, including works by Bertolt Brecht, Jean-Paul Sartre, Thomas Mann, Jorge Luis Borges, and Robert Musil. As Ernesto Ferrero later recalled, Giulio Einaudi was devoted to literature and paid little attention to financial matters. He was not afraid of expenses or debt, and often took risks by publishing authors whom other publishers would not even consider, but who went on to become classics years later. However, his business strategy led to the company's bank debt rising to 360 million by August 7, 1954, with total liabilities amounting to 1,750 million lire.

Among Einaudi's key publications of the second half of the XX century the most notable are: The History of Italy, a six-volume book published in 1972–1982, The Encyclopaedia (16 volumes, 1977–1982), The History of Italian Art (12 volumes, 1979–1983).

In 1946, Giulio Einaudi commissioned Renato Guttuso to design a new version of the logo. Several years later, in 1951, Pablo Picasso painted his version of the logo and presented it to Giulio Einaudi. This version became the logo of Tascabili, a signature pocketbooks collection of the publisher. Another version of Einaudi's logo was designed in 1961 by Giacomo Manzù.

In 1962, following Giulio Einaudi's refuse to publish the collected works of Friedrich Nietzsche, Foà left Einaudi and, together with his friends Roberto Bazlen and Alberto Zevi, co-founded Adelphi Edizioni. In 1963, Ernesto Ferrero joined Einaudi as head of the press office. He later became literary director and served as publishing director in 1984-1989.

In the 1980s, the publisher was in crisis, until in 1987 it ended up under receivership. In 1994, Einaudi was sold to the Mondadori Group, at the time controlled by Silvio Berlusconi.

In 1996, Einaudi launched Stile libero, a groundbreaking collection of books by modern and emerging authors. In the following years, it grew into a vast collection spanning a wide variety of formats and genres — from DVDs to graphic novels.

In 1999, Giulio Einaudi passed away. He was succeeded at Einaudi by Roberto Cerati.

=== 21st century ===
In 2000, Giulio Paolini designed a new, modern version of the publisher's logo.

Roberto Cerati died in 2013. Since 2014, Walter Barberis has been the president of Einaudi. In 2025, the company reported revenue of €55 mln.

== Literature ==
- Gobetti, Ada (2014). Partisan Diary: A Woman's Life in the Italian Resistance. Oxford: Oxford University Press. ISBN 9780199380558.
- Giocondi, Michele (2018). Breve storia dell’editoria italiana (1861-2018) con 110 schede monografiche delle case editrici di ieri e di oggi. Dai fratelli Treves a Jeff Bezos. ISBN 9788833631196.
