= Alessio Forgione =

Italian writer (born 1986)

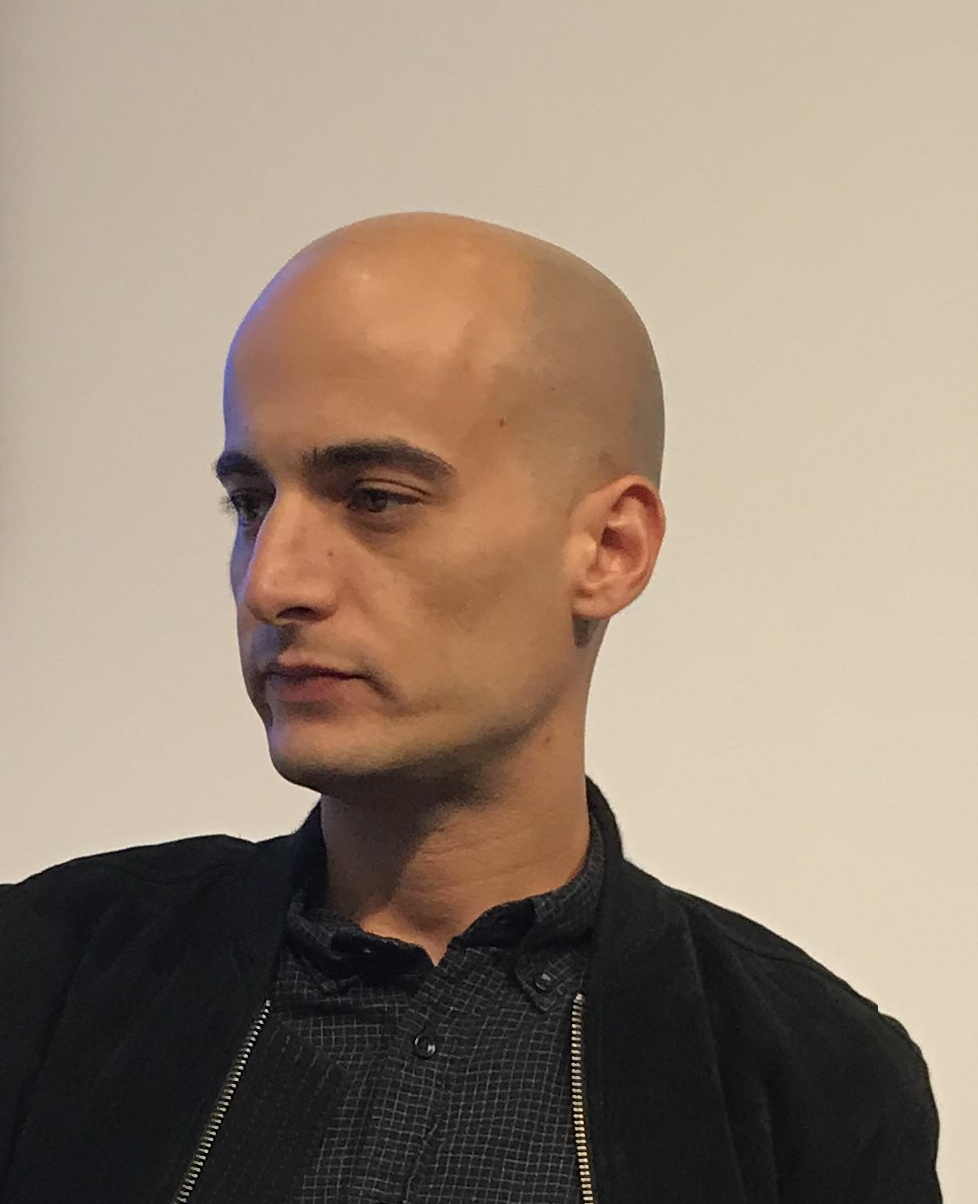
Alessio Forgione

Alessio Forgione is an Italian writer. He was born in Naples in 1986. His debut novel Napoli mon amour (2018) was widely acclaimed. It won the 2019 Berto Prize and the 2021 Prix Mediterranee. It has been translated into French, Russian, German and Greek. It has also been adapted for the stage; the play ran at the Teatro Mercadante in Naples under the direction of Rosario Sparno. His next book is titled Giovanissimi.

== Biography ==
Born in Naples in 1986, he resides there after living for a time in London working in a pub.

In 2018 he made his fiction debut with the novel Napoli mon amour, thanks to which he won the Giuseppe Berto Prize the following year.

The author of two other novels, Giovanissimi released in 2020 and Il nostro meglio published the following year, in 2021 his debut work was awarded the Prix Méditerranée.
