= Luis Landero =

Spanish writer (born 1948)

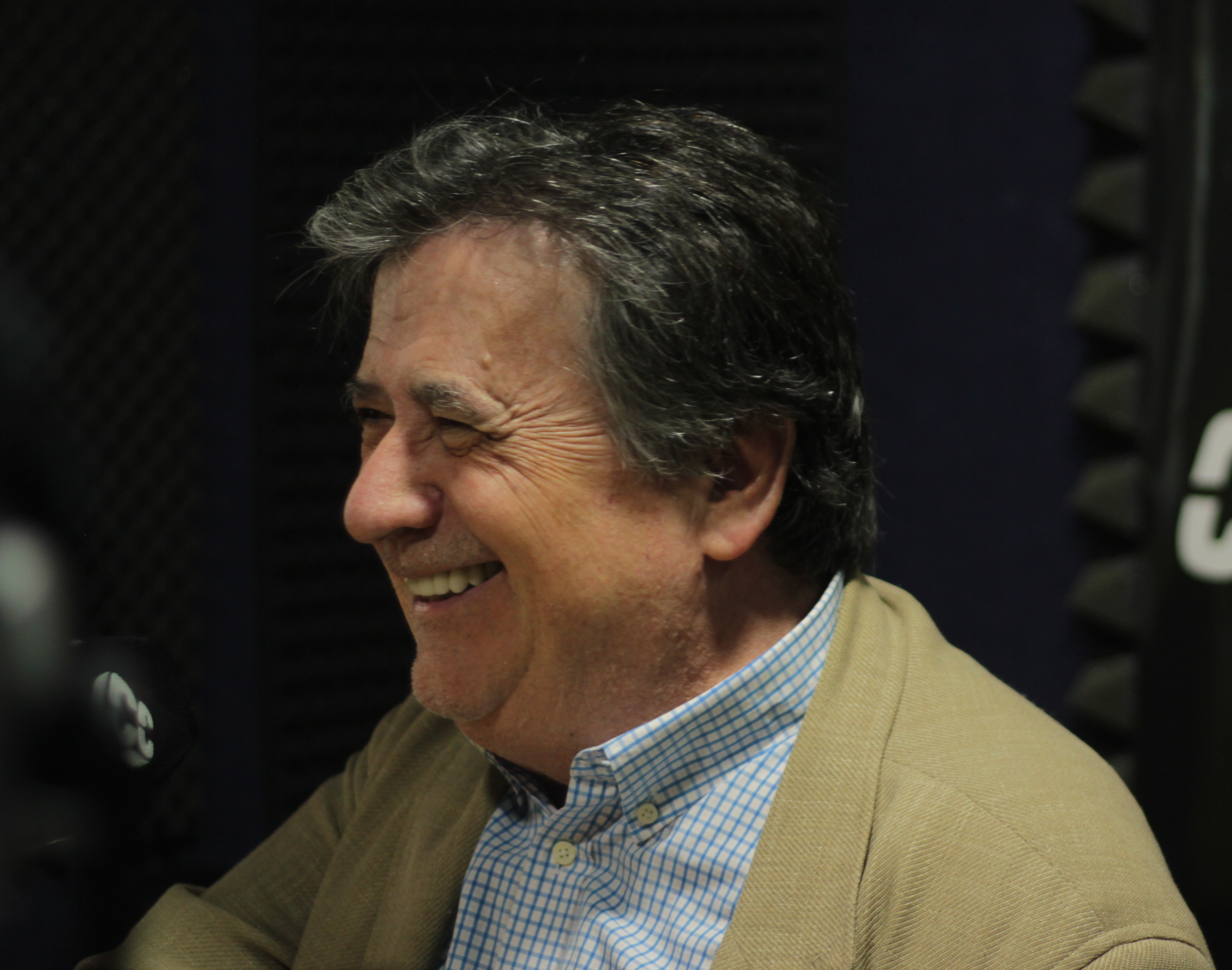
Luis Landero in the radio program Carne Cruda

Luis Landero (born 1948) is a Spanish writer. He was born in Alburquerque, Badajoz and made his literary debut through the 1989 novel Juegos de la edad tardía (winner of the Prix Mediterranee). Subsequent novels include Caballeros de fortuna (1994), El mágico aprendiz (1998), El guitarrista (2002), Hoy, Júpiter (2007), Retrato de un hombre inmaduro (2010), Absolución (2012, chosen by El País as best novel of the year), El balcón en invierno (2014) and La vida negociable (2017). He has been translated into several European languages.
