= Nadia Pinardi =

Italian oceanographer

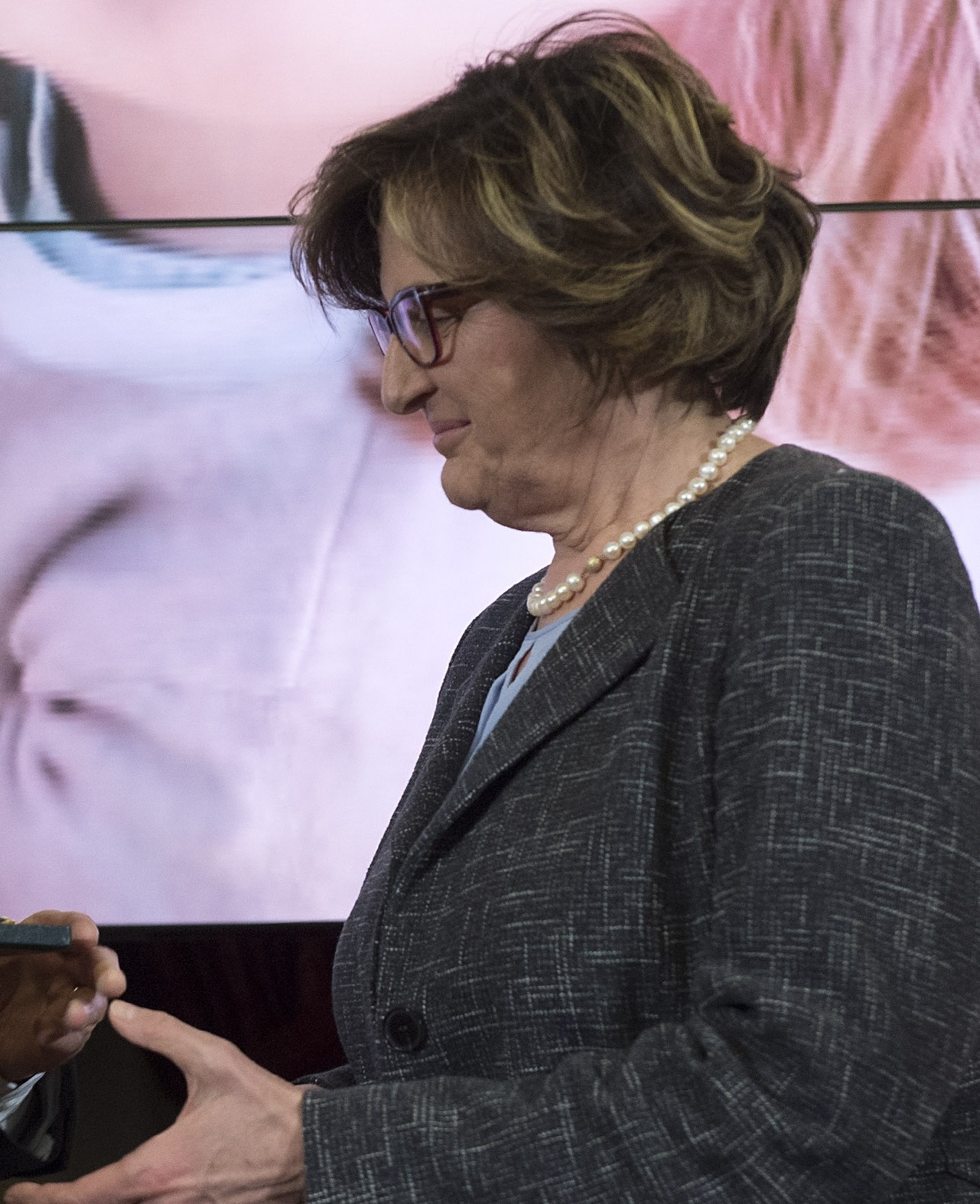
Nadia Pinardi

Nadia Pinardi (born February 22, 1956) is an Italian oceanographer and academic.

== Early life and education ==
She was born in Bologna and studied physics at the University of Bologna. Pinardi went on to receive a master's degree in applied physics and a PhD in applied physics (physical oceanography) from Harvard University.

== Career ==
From 1986 to 1988, she was a post-doctoral fellow in physical oceanography at Harvard. In 1999, she became an associate professor of physical oceanography at the University of Bologna. She has been an associate researcher at the National Institute of Geophysics and Volcanology and the Euro-Mediterranean Center on Climate Change. Since the mid-1990s, Pinardi has coordinated the implementation of operational oceanography in the Mediterranean Sea for UNESCO's Global Ocean Observing System. She is director for the National Group of Operational Oceanography at the Istituto Nazionale di Oceanografia and co-president of the World Meteorological Organization's Joint Committee for Oceanography and Marine Meteorology.

== Recognition ==
In 2007, Pinardi received the Fridtjof Nansen Medal from the European Geosciences Union (EGU) and, in 2008, the Roger Revelle UNESCO Medal. In 2015, she was awarded the Order of Merit of the Italian Republic.

== Organisational affiliations ==
She is a member of the editorial board for Yale University's journal for marine research The Sea. She is an editor for the Journal of Geophysical Research: Oceans. She has been an associate editor for the Journal of Operational Oceanography and has been topic editor for various EGU journals.

== Publications ==
Her book Misurare il mare (2009) was awarded the Sanremo award for best popular scientific book about the sea.
