= Mario Brelich =

Hungarian-Italian author (1910-1982)

Mario Brelich (1910–1982) was an Italian author born in Budapest to an Italian father and Hungarian mother.

== Works ==
- The Work of Betrayal. Translated by Raymond Rosenthal. (Marlboro, Vermont: Marlboro Press, 1989) ISBN 0910395454.
  - L’œuvre de trahison (Gallimard, 1979)
- Navigator of the Flood (Marlboro, Vermont: Marlboro Press, 1991) ISBN 0910395802.
  - Le navigateur du déluge (L. Levi, 1993)
- The Holy Embrace. Translated by John Shepley (Marlboro, Vermont: Marlboro Press, 1994) ISBN 1568970021. Originally published as Il Sacro Amplesso (Milan: Adelphi Edizioni s.p.a., 1972).
  - L'étreinte sacrée (Gallimard, 1978)
- Giuditta (Milano : Adelphi, 2008) ISBN 9788845922589
