= Franco Volpi (philosopher) =

Italian philosopher

Franco Volpi (4 October 1952 in Vicenza – 14 April 2009), was a philosopher, historian of philosophy and a professor at Padua University, who wrote regularly for the Italian newspaper La Repubblica. Volpi was an expert in German philosophy, in particular Martin Heidegger and Arthur Schopenhauer. He investigated the relationship between nihilism and the nothing, and between philosophy and current psychology. In one of his works, he wrote that "real philosophical questions have a history but have no answer". For him, nihilism undermines truth, weakens religion and dissolves dogmatism.

Volpi also taught at the University of Witten/Herdecke as well as the universities of Laval, Poitiers and Nice.

Volpi died on 14 April 2009, at the age of 56, after being run over by an automobile as he rode his bicycle.

== Works ==
- Heidegger e Brentano. L'aristotelismo e il problema dell'univocità dell'essere nella formazione filosofica del giovane Martin Heidegger, Cedam, Padova, 1976, pp. 144
- "La rinascita della filosofia pratica in Germania", in:Filosofia pratica e scienza politica, Francisci, Abano/Padova, 1980, pp. 180 (with Carlo Natali, Laura Iseppi, Claudio Pacchiani)
- "Sulla fortuna del concetto di decadence nella cultura tedesca: Nietzsche e le sue fonti francesi", Filosofia politica, 1995
- Lexikon der philosophischen Werke, Kröner, Stuttgart, 1988
- Guida a Heidegger, Laterza, Roma-Bari 1997, 1998, pp. XVI-387
- Hegel e i suoi critici, Per i licei e gli istituti magistrali, Laterza, Roma-Bari 1998
- Il nichilismo,
- Heidegger e Aristotele, Daphne, Padova, 1984, pp. 226 (ristampa Bari, Laterza, 2010)

== Sources ==
- Ciaramelli, Fabio; Volpi, Franco (1979). "Review of Heidegger e Hegel. La fine della filosofia e il nuovo compito del pensare". Revue Philosophique de Louvain. 77 (36): 600. ISSN 0035-3841. JSTOR 26339004.
- Namer, Emile; Volpi, Franco (1977). "Review of Heidegger e Brentano". Revue Philosophique de la France et de l'Étranger. 167 (4): 485–486. ISSN 0035-3833. JSTOR 41092495.
- Mollnau, Karl A.; Volpi, Franco; Nida-Rümelin, Julian (1990). "Review of Lexikon der philosophischen Werke". ARSP: Archiv für Rechts- und Sozialphilosophie / Archives for Philosophy of Law and Social Philosophy. 76 (1): 139–140. ISSN 0001-2343. JSTOR 23679989.
- Frigerio, Aldo; Volpi, Franco (1997). "Review of Il nichilismo". Rivista di Filosofia Neo-Scolastica. 89 (2/3): 445–447. ISSN 0035-6247. JSTOR 43063078.
- D.B.; Volpi, Franco (1997). "Review of Il nichilismo". Il Politico. 62 (3 (182)): 511–512. ISSN 0032-325X. JSTOR 43101749.
- Volonté, P.; Heidegger, M.; Volpi, F. (1993). "Review of Il concetto di tempo". Rivista di Filosofia Neo-Scolastica. 85 (1): 168. ISSN 0035-6247. JSTOR 43062285.
- Onnasch, E.-O.; Volpi, Franco (2001). "Review of Großes Werklexikon der Philosophie". Tijdschrift voor Filosofie. 63 (1): 208. ISSN 1370-575X. JSTOR 40889081.Schuhmann, Karl; Volpi, Franco; Nida-Rümelin, Julian (1990). "Review of Lexikon der philosophischen Werke". Zeitschrift für philosophische Forschung. 44 (3): 502–505. ISSN 0044-3301. JSTOR 20484386.
- Sanders, Luk; Schopenhauer, Arthur; Volpi, Franco; Lansink, Cyril (2012). "Review of De kunst om gelukkig te zijn uiteengezet in vijftig leefregels". Tijdschrift voor Filosofie. 74 (3): 596–597. ISSN 1370-575X. JSTOR 23530313.
- Dalmasso, G.; Iseppi, L.; Natali, C.; Pacchiani, C.; Volpi, F. (1984). "Review of Filosofia pratica e scienza politica". Rivista di Filosofia Neo-Scolastica. 76 (3): 500–501. ISSN 0035-6247. JSTOR 43061276.
- Deniau, Guy; Volpi, Franco (2001). "Review of Il nichilismo, Roma-Bari". Les Études philosophiques (3): 407–409. ISSN 0014-2166. JSTOR 20849419.
- Daveri, Francesco; Volpi, Franco (1995). "Review of Introduzione all'economia dello sviluppo". Giornale degli Economisti e Annali di Economia. 54 (1/3): 146–147. ISSN 0017-0097. JSTOR 23248048.
- Mangiagalli, Maurizio; Heidegger, Martin; von Herrmann, F.-W.; Volpi, F. (1988). "Review of Segnavia". Rivista di Filosofia Neo-Scolastica. 80 (3): 480–481. ISSN 0035-6247. JSTOR 43061821.
- Mangiagalli, Maurizio; Grossner, Claus; Volpi, F. (1983). "Review of I filosofi tedeschi contemporanei tra neomarxismo, ermeneutica e razionalismo critico". Rivista di Filosofia Neo-Scolastica. 75 (4): 705–706. ISSN 0035-6247. JSTOR 43061189.
- Villani, A.; Volpi, F. (1964). "Review of Formazione dei valori del suolo urbano e imposta sulle aree fabbricabili. Istituto Lombardo per gli Studi Economici e Sociali". Rivista Internazionale di Scienze Sociali. 35 (Anno 72) (2): 226–229. ISSN 0035-676X. JSTOR 41629775.
- Volpi, Franco; Grondin, J. (1986). "Review of Heidegger e Aristotele". Archives de Philosophie. 49 (1): 151–154. ISSN 0003-9632. JSTOR 43035047.
- Caroli, Gluliano; Schmitt, Carl; Castrucci, Emanuele; Volpi, Franco (1992). "Review of Il Nomos della terra nel diritto internazionale dello jus publicum europaeum". Rivista di Studi Politici Internazionali. 59 (1 (233)): 172–173. ISSN 0035-6611. JSTOR 42737022.
