= Giorgio Manganelli =

Italian writer

- Born: 15 November 1922; Milan
- Died: 28 May 1990 (aged 67); Rome
- Occupations: short story writer, essayist, novelist, translator
- Writing career
- Genres: short story, essay, novel
- Notable works: Hilarotragedia, La letteratura come menzogna, Centuria: cento piccoli romanzi fiume
- Literary movement: Neoavanguardia

Giorgio Manganelli (15 November 1922 – 28 May 1990) was an Italian journalist, avant-garde writer, translator and literary critic. A native of Milan, he was one of the leaders of the avant-garde literary movement in Italy in the 1960s, Gruppo 63. He was a baroque and expressionist writer. Manganelli translated Edgar Allan Poe's complete stories and authors like T. S. Eliot, Henry James, Eric Ambler, O. Henry, Ezra Pound, Robert Louis Stevenson, Byron's Manfred and others into Italian. He published an experimental work of fiction, Hilarotragoedia, in 1964, at the time he was a member of the avant-garde Gruppo 63 (Group 63). Centuria, which won the Viareggio Prize, is probably his most approachable; it was translated into English in 2005 by Henry Martin. Agli dei ulteriori comprises a linked collection of short pieces, including an exchange of letters between Hamlet and the Princess of Cleves and concludes with a fake learned article on the language of the dead. He died in Rome in 1990. He was an atheist. Italo Calvino called him 'a writer unlike any other, an inexhaustible and irresistible inventor in the game of language and ideas'.

== Works ==
- Hilarotragedia (1964, n.ed. 1987)
- La letteratura come menzogna (1967, n.ed. 1985)
- Nuovo commento (1969, n.ed. 1993)
- Agli dèi ulteriori (1972, n.ed. 1989)
- Lunario dell'orfano sannita (1973, n.ed. 1989)
- Cina e altri orienti (1974)
- In un luogo imprecisato (1974)
- A e B (1975)
- Sconclusione (1976)
- Pinocchio: un libro parallelo (1977, n.ed. 2003)
- Cassio governa a Cipro (1977)
- Centuria: cento piccoli romanzi fiume (1979, n.ed. 1995)
- Amore (1981)
- Angosce di stile (1981)
- Discorso dell'ombra e dello stemma (1982)
- Dall'inferno (1985, n.ed. 1998)
- Tutti gli errori (1986)
- Laboriose inezie (1986)
- Rumori o voci (1987)
- Salons (1987, n.ed. 2000)
- Improvvisi per macchina da scrivere (1989)
- Antologia privata (1989)
- Encomio del tiranno (1990)
- La palude definitiva (1991)
- Il presepio (1992)
- Esperimento con l'India (1992)
- Il rumore sottile della prosa (1994)
- La notte (1996)
- Le interviste impossibili (1997, but 1975)
- De America (1998, ed. L.Scarlini)
- Contributo critico allo studio delle dottrine politiche del '600 italiano (1999, ed. P.Napoli)
- Il vescovo e il ciarlatano (2001, ed. E.Trevi)
- La penombra mentale. Interviste e conversazioni 1965–1990 (2001, ed. R.Deidier)
- L'infinita trama di Allah. Viaggi nell'Islam 1973–1987 (2002, ed. G.Pulce)
- L'impero romanzesco (2003, ed. V.Papetti)
- UFO e altri oggetti non identificati (2003, ed. R.Manica)
- Il romanzo inglese del Settecento (2004, ed. V.Papetti)
- La favola pitagorica. Luoghi italiani (2005, ed. A.Cortellessa)
- Tragedie da leggere. Tutto il teatro (2005, ed. L.Scarlini)
- L'isola pianeta e altri settentrioni (2006, ed. A.Cortellessa)
- Poesie (2006, ed. D.Piccini)
- Un'allucinazione fiamminga (2006, ed. G.Pulce)
- Mammifero italiano (2007, ed. M.Belpoliti)
- Vita di Samuel Johnson (2008)
- Circolazione a più cuori. Lettere familiari (2008)
- Ti ucciderò, mia capitale (2011, ed. S.S.Nigro)

TRANSLATED INTO ENGLISH

- "Tutti gli errori" "All the Errors" translated by Henry Martin, McPherson and Company, New York, 1986.
- "Centuria" "Centuria: One Hundred Ouroboric Novels" translated by Henry Martin, McPherson and Company, 2005.
- "Agli dei ulteriori" "To those Gods beyond" translated by John Walker, Atlas Press. London, 2019.
- "La Letteratura come menzogna" "Literature as Deception" translated by John Walker, Atlas Press, London, 2019.

TRANSLATED INTO FRENCH

- "Hilarotragoedia" translated by Christophe Mileschi, Zones Sensibles, 2017.

CRITICAL STUDIES IN ENGLISH

- "The Eloquence of Ghosts: Giorgio Manganelli and the Afterlife of the Avant-Garde", Florian Mussgnug, Peter Lang, 2010.
- "Giorgio Manganelli and the Illegible Obscene," Rebecca Falkoff, Italian Studies, Vol. 70 No. 1, 2015.

== Awards ==
- 1979 Viareggio Prize in Literature for Centuria
