= Stresa Prize =

Italian literary award

The Stresa Prize (Italian: Premio Stresa [ˈprɛːmjo ˈstreːza]) is a literary award prize founded in 1976 by a group of intellectuals, including Mario Bonfantini, Mario Soldati, Gianfranco Lazzaro, Franco Esposito and Piero Chiara. In the early years, the jury also included writers and intellectuals such as Carlo Bo, Giovanni Spadolini, Giorgio Barberi Squarotti and Primo Levi. It is reserved for works in Italian published in Italy and Switzerland.

== History ==
It did not take place from 1985 until 1995 when it was taken over by the Pro Loco Tourist Association of Stresa, which takes care until today.

== Selection process ==
The selection is made by a jury of critics who choose 5 finalist books which are also voted on in the final vote by a jury of readers.

== Winners ==
- 1976: Gianfranco Lazzaro
- 1977: Eugenio Travaini
- 1978: Marise Ferro
- 1980: Carlo Della Corte
- 1981: Virginia Galante Garrone
- 1983: Davide Lajolo
- 1984: Giorgio De Simone
- 1995: Duilio Pallottelli
- 1996: Enrico Fovanna
- 1997: Dante Maffia
- 1998: Guido Conti
- 1999: Maurizio Maggiani
- 2000: Alberto Bevilacqua
- 2001: Roberto Pazzi
- 2002: Diego Marani
- 2003: Simonetta Agnello Hornby
- 2004: Antonia Arslan
- 2005: Maurizio Cucchi
- 2006: Marco Santagata
- 2007: Paolo Rumiz
- 2008: Andrea Fazioli
- 2009: Giuseppe Conte
- 2010: Francesco Carofiglio
- 2011: Bruno Arpaia
- 2012: Francesca Melandri
- 2013: Lidia Ravera
- 2014: Valentina D'Urbano
- 2015: Lorenzo Marone
- 2016: Carmine Abate
- 2017: Domenico Dara
- 2018: Carolina Orlandi
- 2019: Elena Loewenthal
- 2020: Melania Mazzucco
- 2021: Giosuè Calaciura
- 2022: Fabio Stassi
- 2023: Matteo B. Bianchi
- 2024: Federica Manzon
- 2025: Antonio Albanese
