= Guiducci =

Guiducci is an Italian surname. Notable people with the surname include:

- Armanda Guiducci (1923–1992), Italian writer, literary critic, and Marxist feminist
- Carlotta Guiducci (born 1977), Italian bio-engineer
- Mario Guiducci (1583–1646), Italian scholar and writer
- Mark Guiducci, American editorial director of Vanity Fair
