= Cibrario =

Cibrario is an Italian surname. Notable people with this surname include:

- Alberto Cibrario (1877–1962), Italian physician and painter
- Benedetta Cibrario (born 1962), Italian writer
- Francesco Cibrario, Italian footballer
- Giacinto Cibrario (1843–1917), Italian lawyer and politician, son of Luigi
- Luigi, Count Cibrario (1802–1870), Italian statesman and historian, father of Giacinto
- Maria Cibrario (1905–1992), Italian mathematician
