= Villa La Zizzola, Bra =

19th-century palace in Piedmont, Italy

Coordinates: 44.7028°N 7.8555°E

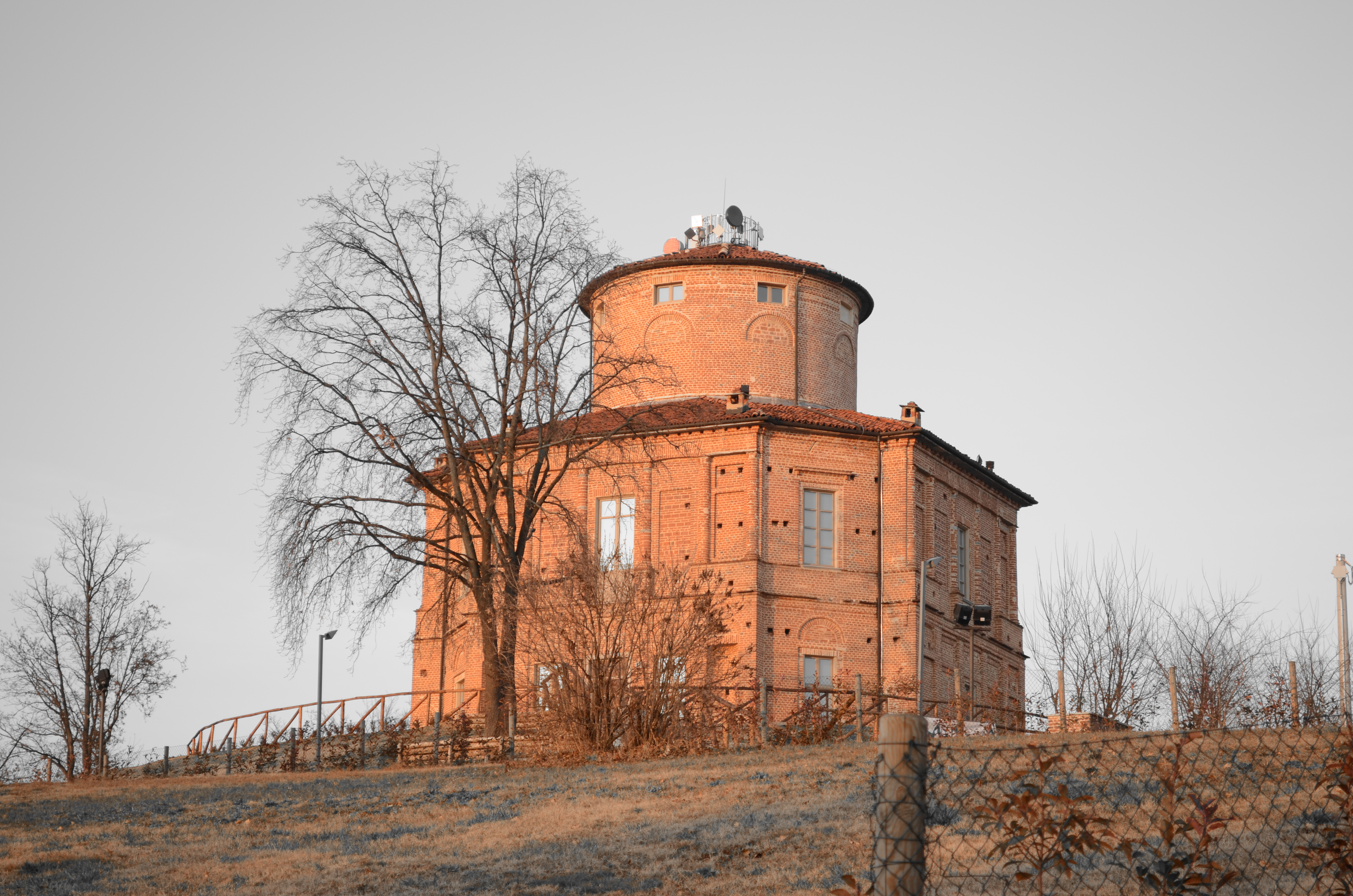
Villa la Zizzola in the winter

La Zizzola is a 19th-century villa, or rural palace, located on the Monteguglielmo hill above the town of Bra in the Province of Cuneo, Piedmont, Italy. Built in an octagonal shape and highly visible from the town, it was constructed in 1840 as a villa delle delizie, or "country house of delights". The villa was donated to the comune in 1962 and is used for cultural events. It has come to be considered one of the symbols of the town.
