= Bra Town Hall =

- Palazzo Comunale di Bra (Italian)
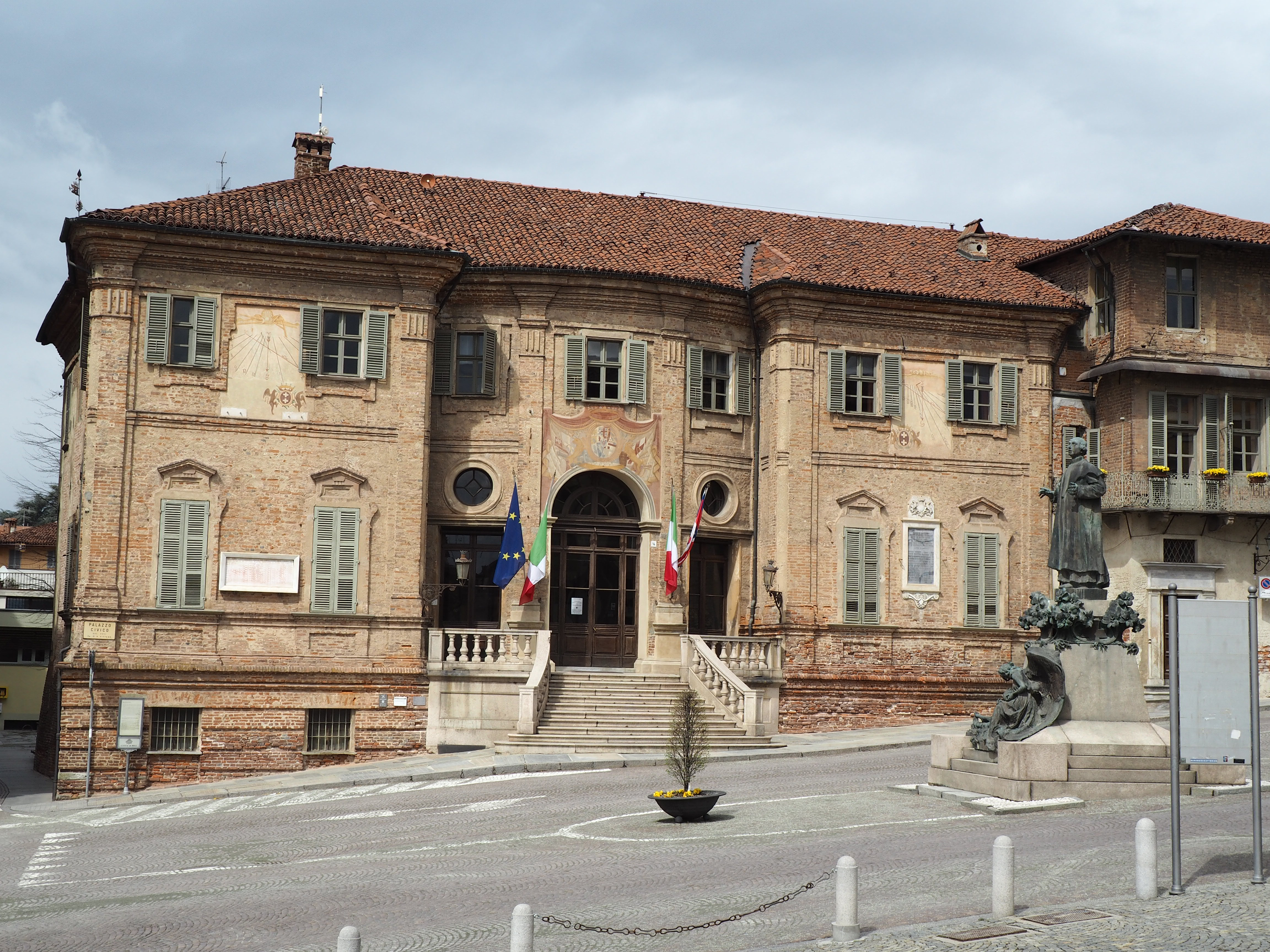
- Bra Town Hall in 2022
- Click on the map for a fullscreen view

General information
- Location: Bra, Italy
- Coordinates: 44°41′51.74″N 7°51′16.17″E

Bra Town Hall (Italian: Palazzo Comunale di Bra) is the town hall of the town and comune of Bra in Italy.

== History ==
The current appearance of the building, which dates back to the Middle Ages, is the result of the work carried out by the architect Bernardo Antonio Vittone in the 18th century. The monumental grand staircase leading to the palace atrium, on the other hand, dates back to 1897.

== Description ==
The building stands on Piazza Caduti della Libertà, next to the church of Sant'Andrea, in the centre of Bra.

It is designed in the Baroque style, with exposed brick façades. The central section of the main façade, vertically divided into three parts, is distinguished by convex forms. Access is provided by a balustraded staircase leading to the large arched doorway, flanked by two rectangular openings, each surmounted by a circular oculus.

Inside, the Council Hall houses the busts of renowned citizens of Bra.

== Gallery ==
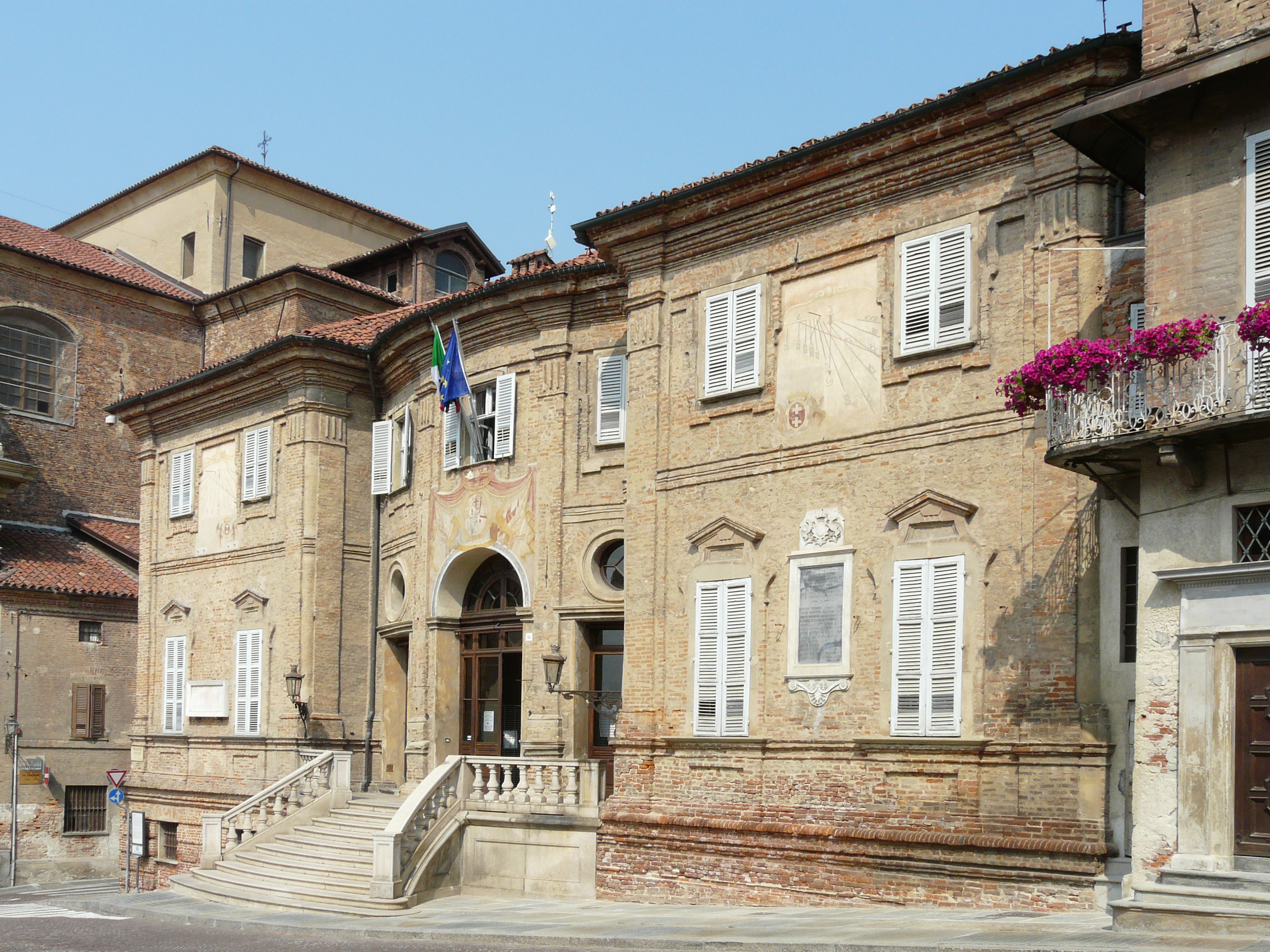

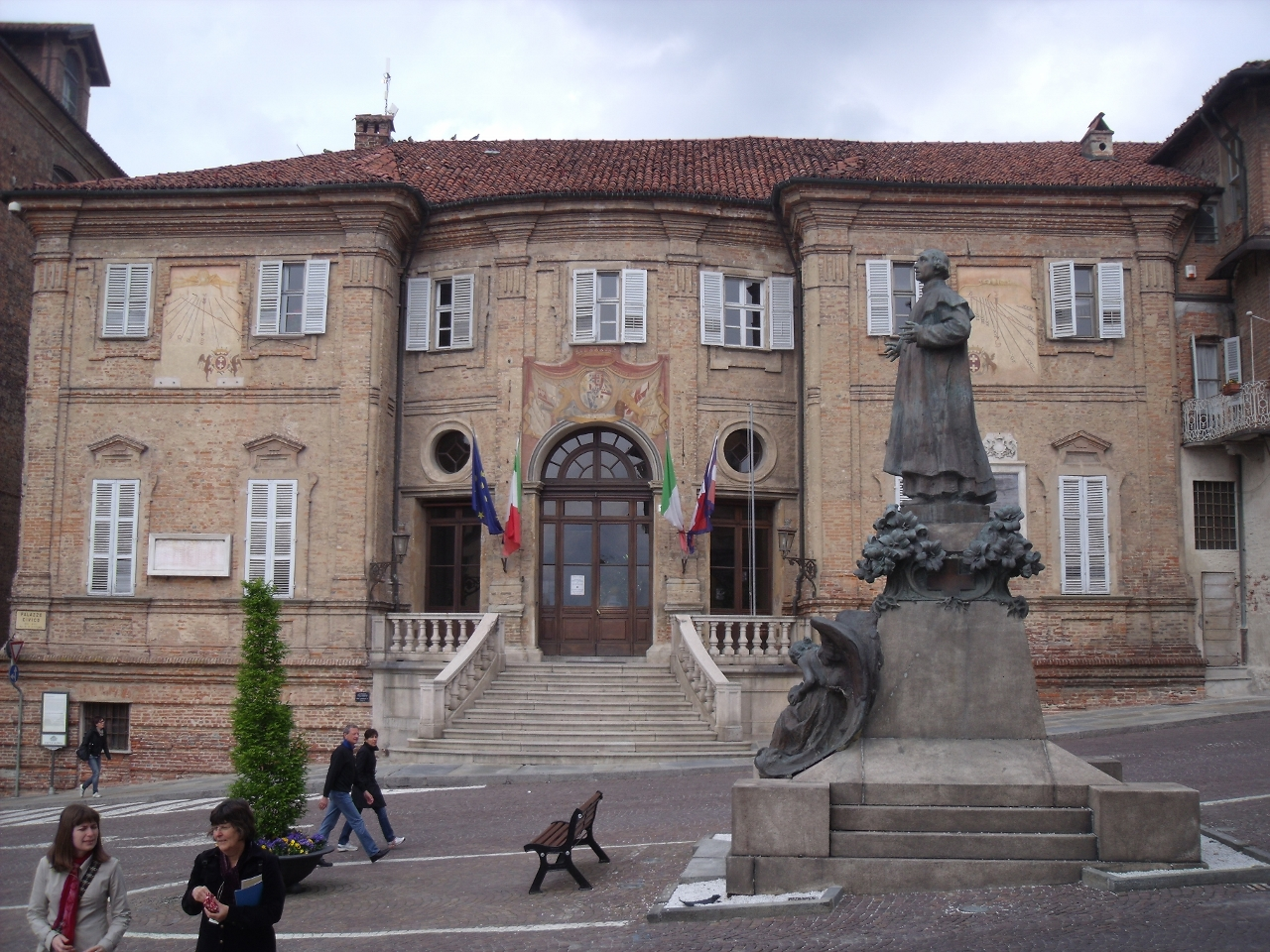

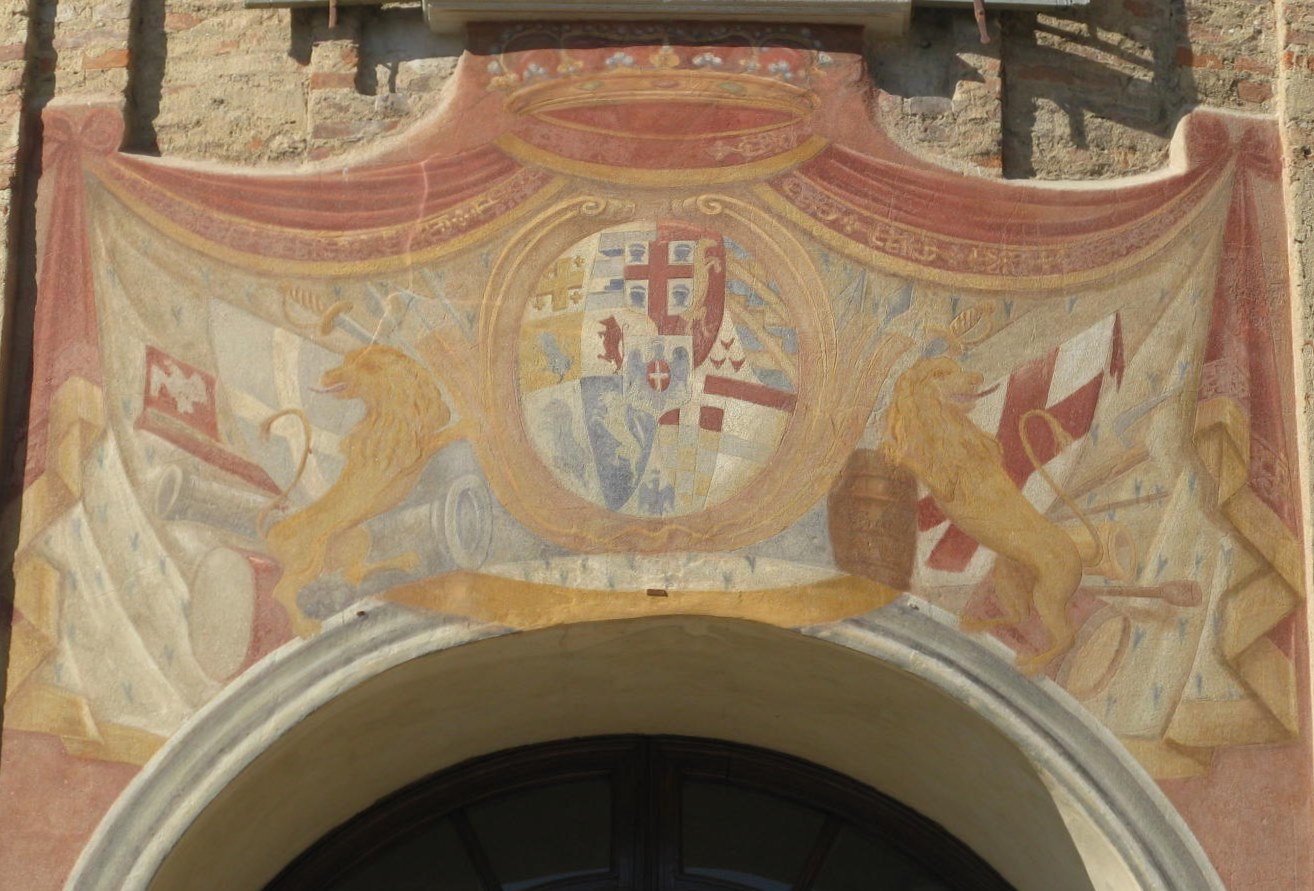
