= Lagorio =

Lagorio is a surname. Notable people with the surname include:

- Gina Lagorio (1922–2005), Italian writer
- Lelio Lagorio (1925–2017), Italian politician
- Lev Lagorio (1826–1905), Russian painter and watercolorist
- Ricardo Lagorio (born 1955), Argentine diplomat
