= Bonvicini =

Bonvicini is a surname. Notable people with the name include:

- Caterina Bonvicini (born 1974), Italian writer
- Franco Bonvicini (1941 1995), Italian comic writer
- Joan Bonvicini (born 1953), American basketball coach
- Michelangelo Baracchi Bonvicini, President of Atomium - European Institute for Science
- Monica Bonvicini (born 1965), Italian artist
