= Rapallo Carige Prize =

Italian literary award

The Rapallo Carige Prize (Italian: Premio Rapallo Carige per la donna scrittrice), renamed Rapallo Bper Banca Prize since 2022 (Premio Rapallo Bper Banca) is an Italian literary award, established in 1985 by the Municipality of Rapallo and the Carige Bank (Banca Carige).

The award is intended to promote writing by women and is open to new works by women writers in Italian. The winner receives 20,000 euros.

== Recipients ==
- 1985 – Virginia Galante Garrone: L'ora del tempo (Garzanti)
- 1986 – Giuliana Berlinguer: Una per sei (Comunia)
- 1987 – Gina Lagorio: Golfo del paradiso (Garzanti)
- 1988 – Rosetta Loy: Le strade di polvere (Einaudi)
- 1989 – Edith Bruck: Lettera alla madre (Garzanti)
- 1990 – Paola Capriolo: Il nocchiero Feltrinelli)
- 1991 – Armanda Guiducci: Virginia e l'angelo (Longanesi)
- 1992 – Susanna Tamaro: Per voce sola (Marsilio)
- 1993 – Camilla Salvago Raggi: Prima del fuoco (Longanesi)
- 1994 – Laura Mancinelli: Gli occhi dell'imperatore (Einaudi)
- 1995 – Sandra Verda: Il male addosso (Bollati Boringhieri)
- 1996 – Helga Schneider: Il rogo di Berlino (Adelphi)
- 1997 – Francesca Duranti: Sogni Mancini (Rizzo)
- 1998 – Romana Petri: Alle Case Venie (Marsilio)
- 1999 – Anna Maria Mori and Nelida Milani: Bora (Frassinelli)
- 2000 – Renata Pisu: La via della Cina (Sperling & Kupfer)
- 2001 – Paola Mastrocola: La gallina volante (Guanda)
- 2002 – Margaret Mazzantini: Non ti muovere (Mondadori)
- 2003 – Francesca Marciano: Casa Rossa (Longanesi)
- 2004 – Francesca Duranti: L'ultimo viaggio della Canaria (Marsilio)
- 2005 – Patrizia Bisi: Daimon (Einaudi)
- 2006 – Silvia Ballestra: La Seconda Dora (Rizzoli)
- 2007 – Brunella Schisa: La donna in nero (Garzanti)
- 2008 – Caterina Bonvicini, L'equilibrio degli squali (Garzanti)
- 2009 – Daria Bignardi, Non vi lascerò orfani (Mondadori)
- 2010 – Benedetta Cibrario, Sotto cieli noncuranti (Feltrinelli)
- 2011 – Federica Manzon, Di fama e di sventura (Mondadori)
- 2012 – Francesca Melandri, Più alto del mare (Rizzoli)
- 2013 – Emanuela Abbadessa, Capo Scirocco (Rizzoli)
- 2014 – Emmanuelle de Villepin, La vita che scorre (Longanesi)
- 2015 – Valentina D'Urbano, Quella vita che ci manca (Longanesi)
- 2016 – Sara Rattaro, Splendi più che puoi (Garzanti)
- 2017 – Anilda Ibrahimi, Il tuo nome è una promessa (Einaudi)
- 2018 – Rosella Postorino, Le assaggiatrici (Feltrinelli)
- 2019 – Cinzia Leone, Ti rubo la vita (Mondadori)
- 2020 – Simona Vinci, Mai più sola nel bosco (Marsilio)
- 2021 – Ilaria Tuti, Fiore di roccia (Longanesi)
- 2022 - Francesca Maccani, "Le donne dell'Acquasanta" (Rizzoli, Fiction; Maura Gancitano, “Specchio delle mie brame” (Einaudi) and Bianca Pitzorno, “Donna con libro” (Salani), Non-Fiction.
- 2023 - Claudia Petrucci, "Il cerchio perfetto" (Sellerio), Italian Fiction; Catherine Dunne, "A Good Enough Mother (Betimes Books), European Fiction; Sara De Simone, “Nessuna come lei. Katherine Mansfield e Virginia Woolf. Storia di un’amicizia” (Neri Pozza), Non-Fiction;
- 2024 - Enrica Ferrara, "Mia madre aveva una Cinquecento gialla" (Fazi), Italian Fiction; Amélie Nothomb, "Psychopompe", European Fiction; Daria Bignardi “Ogni prigione è un’isola” (Mondadori); Special Jury Prize Adriana Cavarero for her Career.

== See also ==
- List of literary awards honoring women
