= Le invasioni barbariche =

- Starring: Daria Bignardi
- Country of origin: Italy
- Original language: Italian
- No. of episodes: N/A

Original release
- Network: La7
- Release: 2005 – present

Le Invasioni Barbariche is an Italian television talk show hosted by the Italian journalist Daria Bignardi and is broadcast on La7.
