= Laverda (disambiguation) =

Laverda was an Italian manufacturer of high-performance motorcycles.

Laverda may also refer to:

- Laverda (harvesters), Italian manufacturer of combine harvesters and hay equipment
- Carlo Laverda (born 1947), Italian sprinter

== See also ==
- Verda (disambiguation)
