= L'Armonista =

1984 novel by Giorgio de Simone

l'Armonista
- Author: Giorgio De Simone
- Original title: L'Armonista
- Language: Italian
- Publication date: 1984
- Publication place: Italy
- Original text: L'Armonista at Italian Wikisource

The Armonist (Italian: L'Armonista is a 1984 novel by Giorgio De Simone. It won the Stresa Prize dor Literature in 1984.

== Plot summary ==
Tito Calavà, an only-one child, has always suffered from his parents' separation. They entrusted him to an uncle, who involved him in his studies. Now he has become a harmonist, a scholar seeking possible connections between texts from different eras and authors that can uncover the continuity and ultimate purpose of a thought.

Now, urged by his wife, he is in London to meet his father and claim everything he deserves. However, an unexpected event could transform the entire balance.
