= Margherita Oggero =

Italian screenwriter and author

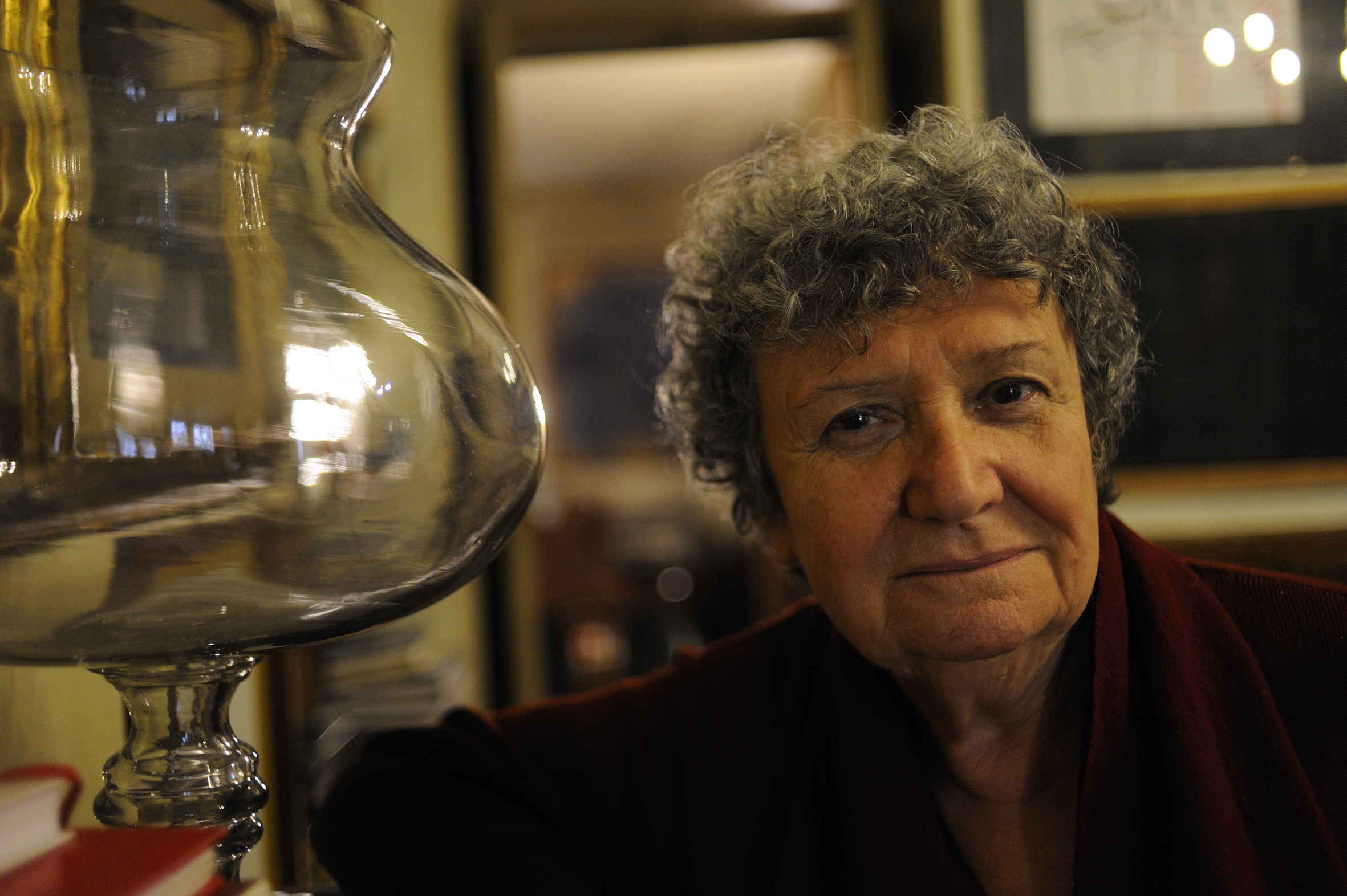
- Born: 22 March 1940 (age 85); Turin
- Occupations: Writer, screenwriter, teacher

Margherita Oggero (born 22 March 1940) is an Italian screenwriter and author.

Margherita Oggero was born 22 March 1940 in Turin where she still lives. She worked as a teacher until later life when she took up writing full time. She published her first novel in 2002. She went on to publish more novels and work on the text for a photographic book by Mauro Raffini in 2007. Her work was used to create the film If I have to be honest. 2011 saw the publication of her first children's book. Oggero created the stories behind the TV series Try again prof! with Veronica Pivetti. In 2015, Oggero won the Bancarella Award for the book La ragazza si fronte. She is best known for her regional mysteries featuring a high school teacher in Turin.

== Bibliography ==
- La ragazza di fronte (2015)
- Perduti tra le pagine (2013)
- L'ora di pietra (2011)
- Risveglio a Parigi (2009)
- Il compito di un gatto di strada (2009)
- Così parlò il nano da giardino (2006)
- L'amica americana (2005)
- La collega tatuata (2002)
