= Giorgio De Simone =

Italian journalist, novelist and writer (1932–2024)

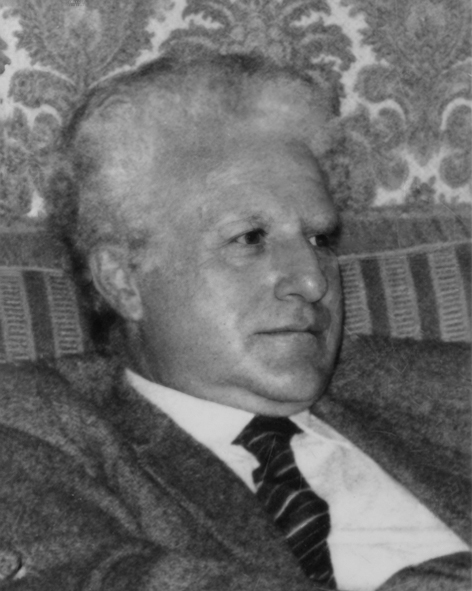
- De Simone during a literary salon, at Elena Cazzulani's house, in 1984
- Born: 1932; Milan, Italy
- Died: January 2024 (aged 91–92); Milan, Italy

Giorgio De Simone (born 1932 – January 2024) was an Italian journalist, novelist and writer.

== Biography ==
Born in Milan in 1932, he graduated in modern literature at a very young age to write, beginning with short stories in widely read periodicals. He worked in large-scale industry, primarily on journalism and communications.

He is the author of articles published in the daily newspaper Il Giorno (in the 1980s) and Avvenire.

== Works ==
=== Journalism ===
- Il lettore arrabbiato, ed. Pola, cover by Armando Testa, 1976

=== Novels ===
- 1977 - La gabbia di carta, Edizioni Paoline, Milan
- 1980 - L'escluso, Mondadori, Milan (Endine Prize 1980)
- 1981 - L'incisione, Rizzoli, Milan (Città di Penne Prize 1981)
- 1984 - L'Armonista, Rizzoli, Milan (Stresa Prize; sel. Viareggio Prize 1985; Premio Europa 1985; Annese Prize 1986)
- 1988 - Il caso Anima, Rizzoli, Milan (Maria Cristina di Savoia Literary Prize 1990)
- 1998 - L'isola dei pantèi, Sellerio editore, Palermo 1998 (Latina Prize 1999), translated in Romanian as Isola fermecatâ, Ed. Meronia, Bucarest, 2008
- 2004 - Mondo prossimo, Ed. Ares, Milan
- 2006 - Era un giorno di 32 ore, Sellerio editore, Palermo
- 2012 - Michele tiene all'Inter ma crede in Dio, Ed. Medusa, Milan
