= Paola Capriolo =

Italian novelist and translator

Paola Capriolo (born 1 January 1962) is an Italian novelist and translator.

The daughter of a theatre critic and translator from Liguria and an artist from Turin, she was born in Milan and was educated at the University of Milan, receiving a degree in philosophy in 1996. In 1988, she published her first book La grande Eulalia, a collection of short stories which won the Giuseppe Berto Prize.

Her work explores a reality outside of day-to-day life. Myth plays an important role in her writing. She often is inspired by music, including references to music and making use of musical metaphors.

Capriolo is also a reviewer for Corriere della Sera and a translator of German fiction. Her work has been translated into several languages including English, French, Spanish, German, Danish, Dutch and Japanese.

== Selected works ==
=== Novels/short stories ===
- Il nocchiero (1989), received the Rapallo Carige Prize in 1990 and was a finalist for the Premio Campiello in 1991
- Il doppio regno (1991) was a finalist for the Grinzane Cavour Prize in 1992
- Vissi d’amore (1992)
- La spettatrice (1995)
- Un uomo di carattere (1996)
- Barbara (1998)
- Una di loro (2001)
- Qualcosa nella notte. Storia di Gilgamesh, signore di Uruk, e dell'uomo selvatico cresciuto tra le gazzelle (2003)
- ll pianista muto (2009)
- Caino (2012)
- Mi ricordo (2015)

=== Children's literature ===
- La ragazza dalla stella d'oro (1991)
- L’amico invisibile (2006)
- Maria Callas (2007)
- Indira Gandhi (2009)
- La macchina dei sogni (2009)

=== Translations from German ===
- La morte a Venice Thomas Mann (1991)
- I dolori del giovane Werther Johann Wolfgang von Goethe (1993)
- Le affinità elettive Johann Wolfgang von Goethe (1995)
- Doppio sogno Arthur Schnitzler (2002)
- Pietre colorate Adalbert Stifter (2005)
- Metamorfosi Franz Kafka (2011)
