= Francesca Duranti =

Italian writer (1935–2025)

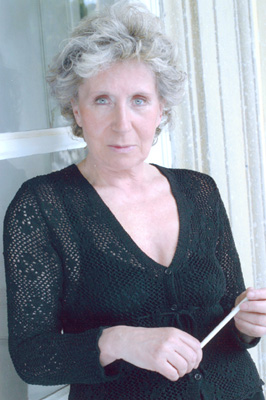
Francesca Duranti

Francesca Duranti (2 January 1935 – 31 October 2025) was an Italian writer.

== Background ==
Duranti was born Francesca Rossi in Genoa and received a law degree from the University of Pisa. She married Enrico Magnini in 1956; they had one child and separated in 1960. She married Massimo Duranti, they had one child and divorced in 1976.

Duranti died on 31 October 2025, at the age of 90.

== Writing career ==
Duranti began writing during the 1970s. Her first novel La bambina was published in 1976. In 1978, she published Piazza mia bella piazza, followed by La casa sul lago della luna, which received the Bagutta Prize and the Premio Martina Franca, in 1984. In 1988, Duranti published Effetti personali, which received the Premio Campiello.

Her work explores the interactions between life and art. Some early works are based on her own life experiences; for example, La bambina draws from her own childhood.

== Selected works ==
- La bambina (1976), (The Little Girl, trans. Judith Woolf, 2010)
- La casa sul lago della luna (1984) (The House on Moon Lake, trans. Stephen Sartarelli, 1986)
- Lieto fine (1987) (Happy Ending, trans. Annapaola Cancogni, 2014)
- Effetti personali (1988), (Personal Effects, trans. Stephen Sartarelli, 1993)
- Sogni mancini (1996), received the Rapallo Carige Prize (Left-Handed Dreams, trans. Nicoletta McGowan, 2012)
- L’ultimo viaggio della canaria (2004), received the Rapallo Carige Prize
