= Alessia Gazzola =

Italian novelist

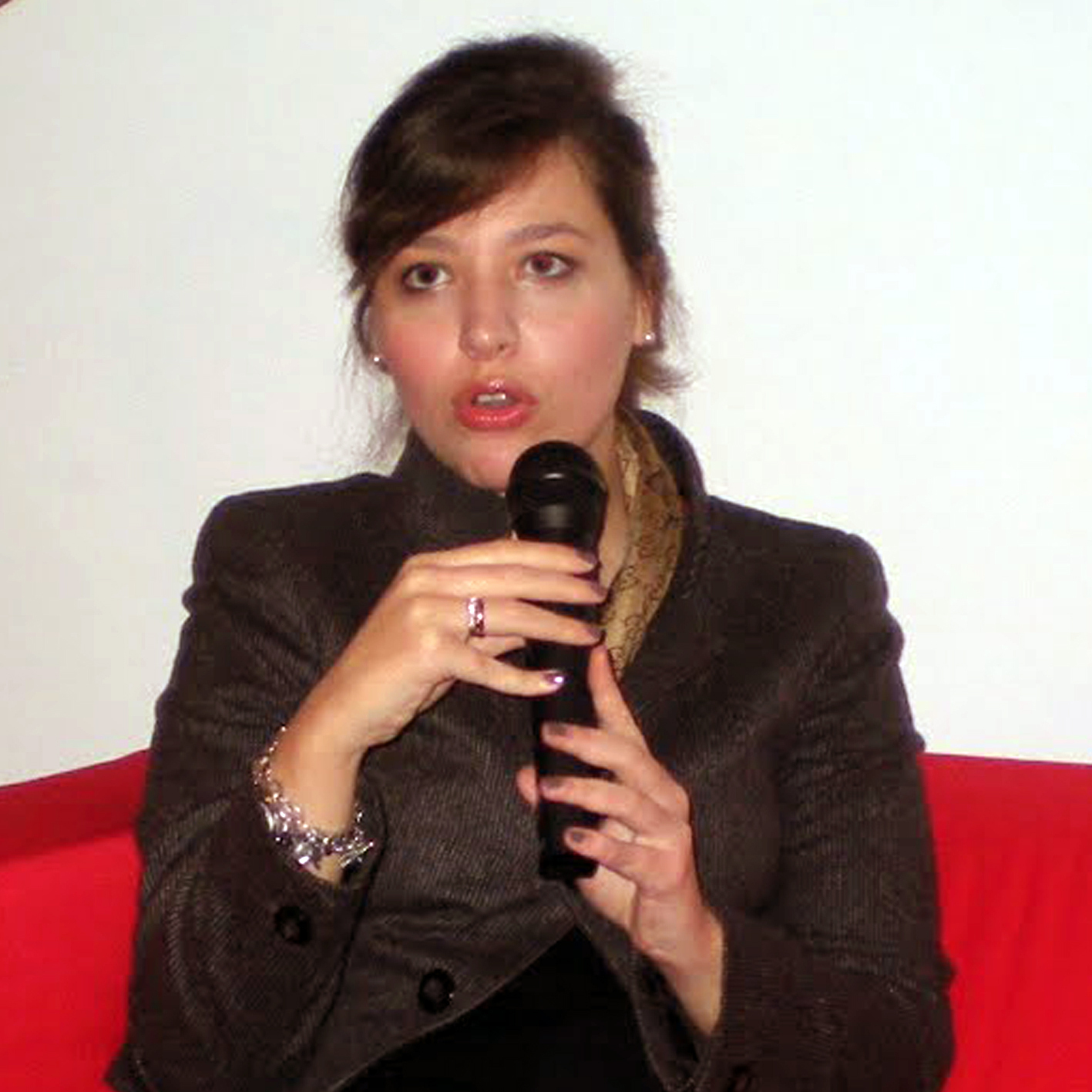
- Born: 9 April 1982 (age 44); Messina, Sicily, Italy
- Occupation: novelist

Alessia Gazzola (born 9 April 1982, Messina, Sicily, Italy) is an Italian novelist.

She graduated in medicine from the University of Messina and later specialized in Forensic Medicine in 2011. She worked as a forensic physician until 2017, when she decided to devote herself entirely to writing.

Gazzola is a medical examiner and she published her first novel, L'allieva, in 2011. Her novels mix crime fiction and chick lit, the central character being Alice Allevi.

Her 2018 novel Il ladro gentiluomo won the 2019 Premio Bancarella.

== Books ==
=== L'allieva novels ===
- L'allieva (Longanesi 2011)
- Un segreto non è per sempre (Longanesi 2012)
- Sindrome da cuore in sospeso (Longanesi 2012)
- Un regalo inatteso (2013) (ebook)
- Le ossa della principessa (Longanesi 2014)
- Una lunga estate crudele (Longanesi, 2015)
- Un po' di follia di primavera (Longanesi 2016)
- Arabesque (Longanesi 2017)
- Il ladro gentiluomo (Longanesi, 2018, ISBN 9788830449633)
- La ragazza del collegio (Longanesi, 2021)

=== Costanza Macallè Series ===
- Questione di Costanza (Longanesi, 2019)
- Costanza e buoni propositi (Longanesi, 2020)
- La costanza è un'eccezione (Longanesi, 2022)

=== Miss Bee Series ===
- Miss Bee e il cadavere in biblioteca (Longanesi, 2024)
- Miss Bee e il principe d'inverno (Longanesi, 2025)
- Miss Bee e il fantasma dell'ambasciata (Longanesi, 2025)
- Miss Bee e il giardino avvelenato (Longanesi, 2025)
- Miss Bee e l'inganno in prima classe (Longanesi, Nov 2026 expected)

=== Other novels ===
- Sbocciano i fiori del male short story in: Nessuna più: quaranta autori contro il femminicidio (Elliot, 2013)
- Non è la fine del mondo (Feltrinelli, 2016)
- Lena e la tempesta (Garzanti 2019)
- My sweet quarantine short story in: Andrà tutto bene. Gli scrittori al tempo della quarantena (Garzanti 2020)
- Un tè a Chaverton House (Garzanti, 2021)
- A Verona con Romeo e Giulietta (Giulio Perrone Editore, 2023)
