= Matteo Strukul =

Italian writer

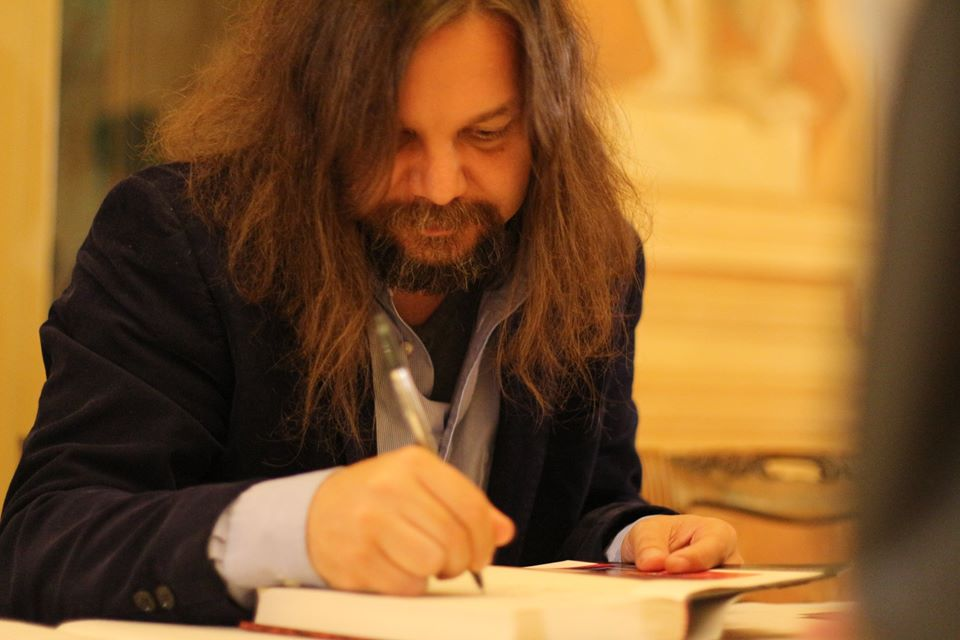
- Strukul in 2019
- Born: 8 September 1973 (age 52); Padova, Italy
- Education: University of Padua
- Occupations: Author, journalist
- Writing career
- Years active: 2008–present
- Notable work: The Medici tetralogy
- Notable awards: Premio Bancarella (2017)
- Website: matteostrukul.com

Matteo Strukul (Italian pronunciation: [matˈtɛːo ˈstruːkul]; 8 September 1973) is an Italian writer and journalist.

== Biography ==
Matteo Strukul was born in 1973 in Padova, in the Veneto region of Italy. After a degree in law at the University of Padua, he achieved a PhD in European Contract Law at the Ca' Foscari University of Venice.

His first novel, a thriller/noir set in his native Veneto and published in Italian in 2011 as La ballata di Mila, was translated into English and released in 2014 by Angry Robot as The Ballad of Mila.

Starting from 2016, Strukul published four historical novels set in Florence between the 15th and the 17th century, following the rise of the House of Medici, which all became bestsellers in Italy. The first of them, I Medici: una dinastia al potere, was awarded in 2017 with the Premio Bancarella (also won, in the past, by such authors as Ernest Hemingway, Boris Pasternak and Ken Follett), and was published in English in 2019 as Medici – Ascendancy. The English version of the second novel in the series, Medici – Supremacy, has been announced for the Autumn of 2020.

His work has been translated in over twenty languages among which are English, French, German, Spanish, Dutch, Serbian and Romanian. It has also been optioned for cinema.

In Italy, Strukul also wrote Vlad, a comic book trilogy for Feltrinelli, with art by Andrea Mutti, focused on the historic character of Vlad the Impaler, the man whose story gave Bram Stoker the inspiration for the character of Count Dracula. The three volumes are being published in English as Vlad Dracul, starting from the Summer of 2020.

It has been announced that Strukul will write the script for a videogame entitled Dark Renaissance, set in Italy, to be released in 2021.

Matteo Strukul is also an adjunct professor of interactive storytelling at Link Campus University in Rome, is a member of the Historical Novel Society and writes in the cultural section of the weekly magazine Il Venerdì di Repubblica.

== Selected bibliography in English ==
=== Novels ===
- 2014 – The Ballad of Mila (La ballata di Mila)
- 2019 – Medici – Ascendancy (I Medici. Una dinastia al potere), Premio Bancarella 2017
- 2020 – Medici – Supremacy (I Medici. Un uomo al potere)

=== Comics ===
- 2020 – Vlad Dracul (Vlad), art by Andrea Mutti
