= Paola Mastrocola =

Italian writer

Paola Mastrocola (born Turin, 1956) is an Italian writer. She was the recipient of the Rapallo Carige Prize for La gallina volante in 2001.
