= Emanuela Abbadessa =

Italian writer

Emanuela Abbadessa (born Catania, 4 August 1964) is an Italian writer. She was the recipient of the Rapallo Carige Prize for Capo Scirocco in 2013.

== Life ==
She graduated in Modern Literature from Catania University in 1996 where she later taught History of Music at the Faculty of Foreign Languages and Literaturesm from 2002 to 2005. Her debut novel was Capo Scirocco (Rizzoli, 2013) which won her the Rapallo Carige Prize for Woman Writers in 2013 at the International Literary Prize of Elba Island R. Brignetti. She was also a finalist at the Alassio Centolibri Prize - An Author for Europe and the City of Rieti Literary Prize.

== Works ==
- Catania : le istituzioni culturali municipali, Palermo : Gruppo Editoriale Kalós, 2001. OCLC 888900415
- La via della stampa : musica per ritrovare gli anni, Catania : Museo Emilio Greco, 2002. OCLC 754164010
- Fiammetta, Milano : Mondolibri, 2016. OCLC 1045937579
- E' da lì che viene la luce Milano : Piemme, 2019. ISBN 9788856669374
- Capo Scirocco Milano : BUR Rizzoli, 2019. ISBN 9788817141826
