= Emmanuelle de Villepin =

French writer (born 1959)

Emmanuelle de Villepin (born 1959) is a French writer. She was the recipient of the Rapallo Carige Prize for La vita che scorre in 2014.
