= Anna Maria Mori =

Italian novelist and journalist

Anna Maria Mori (born Pula, 12 April 1936) is an Italian novelist and journalist. Jointly with Nelida Milani, she was the recipient of the Rapallo Carige Prize for Bora in 1999.
