= Giulio Bedeschi =

Italian writer and military officer (1915–1990)

- Born: 31 January 1915; Arzignano, Kingdom of Italy
- Died: 29 December 1990 (aged 75); Verona, Italy
- Military career
- Allegiance: Kingdom of Italy; Italian Social Republic
- Branch: Royal Italian Army; Black Brigades
- Service years: 1940–1945
- Commands: 25th Black Brigade "Arturo Capanni"
- Conflicts: World War II; Greco-Italian War; Italian campaign on the Eastern Front; Italian Civil War
- Awards: War Cross for Military Valor (twice); War Merit Cross
- Other work: Writer

Giulio Bedeschi (Arzignano, 31 January 1915 – Verona, 29 December 1990) was an Italian writer and Army officer during World War II, best known for his book Centomila gavette di ghiaccio, one of the most famous memoirs of the Italian campaign in Russia.

== Biography ==
Born in the province of Vicenza, Bedeschi graduated in medicine at the University of Bologna before attending the Royal Italian Army's officer cadet school, from which he graduated as a medical officer in 1940. He volunteered for the campaign against Greece, being attached to the 2nd Battalion of the 11th Infantry Regiment, 56th Infantry Division "Casale", with the rank of second lieutenant. He was later transferred to the 13th Battery of the "Conegliano" Artillery Group, 3rd Mountain Artillery Regiment, 3rd Alpine Division "Julia", with which he participated in the Italian campaign on the Eastern Front, being among the survivors of the retreat of the ARMIR in January 1943. He was awarded two War Crosses for Military Valor and one War Merit Cross.

After the armistice of Cassibile he joined the Italian Social Republic, becoming federal secretary of the Republican Fascist Party of Forlì and commanding the 25th Black Brigade "Arturo Capanni", based in the same city. The end of the war found his unit deployed in the Thiene area and engaged against the local Resistance; after dissolving his brigade in Vicenza, he went into hiding and temporarily moved to Sicily, where he spent the early postwar years away from the political violence and "score-settling" between former partisans and Fascists. The Provincial Commission of Forlì for sanctions against politically dangerous fascists judged him a "politically dangerous fascist" and on 24 April 1946 it summoned him for questioning, but he did not comply and was consequently deprived of active and passive voting rights for ten years.

After working for some years in a hospital in Sicily, Bedeschi returned to Veneto and later moved to Brescia and to Milan, working as a rheumatologist. Starting from 1963, Bedeschi published a number of books dealing with the Alpini, the campaign of Russia and more broadly the Italian experience during World War II; these included Centomila gavette di ghiaccio, his personal memoir of the campaign in Russia and his most famous book (originally written in 1945–1946 but only published in 1963), for which he won the Bancarella Prize in 1964, its sequel Il peso dello zaino in 1966, and the "C'ero anch'io" ("I was there, too") series, eight books published between 1972 and 1990 and collecting memoirs from Italian veterans who had fought in Russia (three books, including one focused on the battle of Nikolayevka), Greece and Albania (one book), Yugoslavia (one book), and Africa (one book), as well as one dealing with captivity and one about the experience of the civilian population. In 1974 he was awarded the Maria Cristina di Savoia Literary Prize for his book La rivolta di Abele. He died in Verona in 1990.
