= Camilla Salvago Raggi =

Italian poet and novelist (1924–2022)

Camilla Salvago Raggi (1 March 1924 – 6 April 2022) was an Italian poet and novelist. Born in Genoa, Italy, she was the recipient of the Rapallo Carige Prize for Prima del fuoco in 1993.

In May 1970, she signed a notary deed in favour of the documentation center of the Faculty of Economics of the University of Genoa to which were donated the works of Salvago Raggi, along with professors Giorgio Doria and Edoardo Grendi.

Salvago Raggi died on 6 April 2022 at the age of 98.
