= Luca Desiato =

Italian journalist and writer

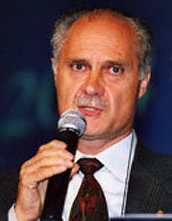
- Born: Luca Desiato; November 13, 1941 (age 84); Rome, Italy
- Occupations: Writer, journalist
- Spouse: Marina Zampieri
- Children: Marco Desiato, Virginia Desiato
- Writing career
- Language: Italian
- Genres: Novel, historical bio
- Notable awards: Grinzane Cavour Prize; Maria Cristina di Savoia Literary Prize

Luca Desiato (born November 13, 1941 in Rome) is an Italian journalist and writer.

He lived for some years in Latin America, where he dedicated his time to theological studies.
He currently lives and works in Rome.

== Bibliography ==
=== Novel ===
- Belfagor Arcidiavolo - ovvero la "Nuova Chiesa" vista da Satana - (Massimo, 1969)
- Il diario di Luca – (Gribaudi, 1971)
- Mirella: diario di una studentessa – (Gribaudi, 1973)
- Il sogno di Papa Asdrubale – (1974)
- Il coraggio si chiama Thomas More – (1974)
- Incomunicabilità e comunione – (1974)
- Benito e il mostro – (Mondadori, 1976)
- Marco: diario di un timido – (1978)
- La marcia su Roma delle amazzoni – (1979)
- Il marchese del Grillo – (Mondadori, 1981)
- Galileo mio Padre – (Mondadori, 1983)
- Come il fuoco – (Mondadori, 1986)

With this novel Luca Desiato won the Basilicata Literary Prize.

- Dialoghi e silenzi – (Paoline, 1988)
- Bocca di Leone – (Rizzoli, 1989)
- Storie dell'eremo – (Gribaudi, 1990)
- Giulioverme e altri racconti – (1990)
- Sulle rive del mar Nero – (Rizzoli, 1992)

With this book the author won the Rhegium Julii Literary Prize and the Frontino Montefeltro Literary Prize.

- La notte dell'angelo – vita scellerata di Caravaggio(Mondadori, 1994)

This novel won the Oplonti Literary Prize and the Penne Literary Prize.

- Giuliano l'Apostata – (Mondadori, 1997)
- Tra la perduta gente – (San Paolo, 1999)
- Dal Giardino Murato – (Messaggero, 2002)
- C'era una volta a Roma, Trilussa – (Mondadori, 2004)
- Minotauro – (Mondadori, 2008)
- Storie del deserto – Le avventure del giovane eremita Apollonio – (San Paolo, 2012)
