= Heinrich Gerlach =

German soldier and writer (1908–1991)

- Born: Heinrich Gerlach; 18 August 1908; Königsberg, East Prussia
- Died: 27 March 1991 (aged 82); Brake, Germany
- Spouse: Ilse Kordl
- Military career
- Allegiance: Nazi Germany
- Branch: Wehrmacht
- Service years: 1939–1944
- Rank: First Lieutenant
- Units: 16th Infantry Division (Wehrmacht); XXXXVIII Panzer Corps; 14th Panzer Division (Wehrmacht); 6th Army (Wehrmacht); 228th News Corp (Wehrmacht)
- Conflicts: Balkan campaign in Yugoslavia; Eastern Front (World War II); Battle of Kiev; Double battle at Vyazma and Bryansk; Case Blue
- Awards: Premio Bancarella (as an author)
- Other work: Odyssey in Red: Report of a Random Walk; Breakthrough at Stalingrad

Heinrich Gerlach (18 August 1908 – 27 March 1991) was a German soldier in the 14th Panzer Division during the Second World War, who later became a Latin and German teacher. His semi-autobiographical novel, The Forsaken Army, was published in West Germany in 1957. It was rewritten with the help of hypnosis after the original manuscript was seized by the Soviets. In 2012, Carsten Gansel discovered the original manuscript in the State Russian Military Archive. It was then published in Germany in 2016 and its English translation was published in 2017 as Breakout at Stalingrad.

== Life ==
Gerlach grew up in Königsberg. He studied at Freiburg from 1927 to 1928 before returning to Königsberg. In the spring of 1931, he passed the first state examination. After a semester of studying in Königsberg, he went to Vienna for two semesters. In the autumn of 1931, he started a one-year apprenticeship at a high school in Tilsit. After that, he went to the Wilhelmsgymnasium in Königsberg, and passed his second state exam in the autumn of 1933. Since there were no positions available for "studien assessor", in October 1933, he worked as a teacher in the Army School in Osterode am Harz. On 20 April 1934 he married his long-time partner, Ilse Kordl, and began working as a substitute teacher in Lyck and was later hired for a permanent job. His family stayed in Lyck until 1944.

=== World War II ===
On 17 August 1939 Gerlach was drafted into the Wehrmacht as a reservist where he was promoted to unteroffizier and appointed leader of telephone-construction crews. From February until April, he was posted to Halle an der Saale for officer cadet training. Following that, he was with the 1st Signals Battalion in Königsberg until August. For the rest of the year, Gerlach served in the 228th Signals Battalion in Westphalia, being promoted to Leutnant on 1 September 1940. From December 1940 to April 1941 he was a platoon leader of the same division and deployed to France. In April 1941, Gerlach and his platoon took part in the Balkan campaign in Yugoslavia and in June of the same year he transferred to the 16th Infantry Division, which took part in the attack on the Soviet Union on 22 June 1941. In July 1942, he was promoted to Oberleutnant and placed on the staff of the XXXXVIII Panzer Corps where he participated in several battles, including the Battle of Kiev, the Battle of Moscow, the double envelopment battles of Vyazma and Bryansk, and Case Blue. From the end of July, the corps belonged to the 6th Army, which was attacking toward Stalingrad. On 24 October 1942 he was transferred to the 14th Panzer Division where he worked as the divisional intelligence officer. His responsibilities included assessing the enemy situation, deployment of subordinate units of defense, letter censorship of subordinate units of the secret field police and attached units of the Propaganda Company. During heavy fighting in the city centre, the 14th Panzer Division lost almost all of their tanks and stood in the section between the Bread Factory and the Volga River. Gerlach was severely wounded in the head and was taken prisoner of war by the end of January 1943.

He was brought to Beketowka, the Stalingrad city prison. On 24 February 1943 he was transported to camp 27 Lunjowo under the control of the Soviet military intelligence (GRU) to Krasnogorsk. Shortly afterwards, on February 28, he was taken to the Lefortovskaya Military Prison in Moscow and put in solitary confinement. He was interrogated by the NKVD for four months because of his position as a Third General Staff Officer and the associated responsibility of the enemy intelligence department. In June, he was sent to Suzdal taken to the NKVD prison camp 160. This camp held only officers, including the generals captured in Stalingrad. On 22 July 1943 he came again to camp 27 near Lunjowo. There he belonged to the 14-member initiative group for the founding of the Association of German Officers (BDO). On 11 September, he became a co-founder of the BDO and co-signer of the Call to the German generals and officers! To people and Wehrmacht! from 12 September 1943. From July 1943 to November 1945, he wrote 21 articles for the newspaper of the National Committee for a Free Germany (NKFD), Free Germany.

On 23 December 1944, by order of the Oberkommando des Heeres, Gerlach was released "provisionally" from active military service in absentia, together with 19 other officers in Soviet captivity, for carrying out a case before the People's Court. Shortly thereafter, he was appointed by the Reichskriegsgericht and sentenced to death. His family was taken to Sippenhaft in July 1944.

=== Postwar ===
In 1949, Gerlach was no longer a political necessity and was sent to various Soviet labour camps before being sent to prison. In the course of a mass sentencing, he was threatened with 25 years of forced labour due to alleged war crimes. Against this background, he agreed to conspiratorial cooperation with Soviet intelligence, which he had previously refused to be engaged in. As a result, he was repatriated in April 1950. On his arrival in Berlin, he was able to escape the Soviet authorities. He then lived with his wife and three children in West Berlin, where he worked as a primary school teacher. In 1951, Gerlach was forced to leave West Berlin after being put under pressure by Soviet agents. He moved with his family to Brake in Lower Saxony, northern West Germany, where he got a job as a secondary school teacher, and after retirement eventually died at the age of 82 on 27 March 1991.

== Books ==
=== Breakthrough at Stalingrad ===
In captivity, Gerlach began to write diary entries about his experiences during the Siege of Stalingrad. Around the end of 1943, he began working on a novel. In addition to his personal experiences, Gerlach also recalled the stories of his fellow prisoners, which allowed him to describe the battle from many perspectives. The original manuscript for the novel Breakout at Stalingrad, which Gerlach claims to have completed on 8 May 1945, was confiscated by the Soviets in 1949.

Upon returning to Germany, Gerlach learned of the possibility of recovering memories from the subconscious through hypnotism in a copy of Quick magazine. In the hope of being able to reconstruct his novel, he contacted the Munich-based doctor and psychologist Dr Karl Schmitz. This was just before the publication of Schmitz's book What is - what can - what good is hypnosis?. Schmitz saw an opportunity with Gerlach to distinguish himself as a luminary in the field of hypnosis. Since Gerlach could not afford the treatment, Schmitz proposed funding the hypnosis treatment to complete his story and provide Schmitz with proof of his work. Although he was able to reconstruct significant parts of the novel, Gerlach needed several more years to complete the second version. It appeared in 1957 under the title The Betrayed Army. In 1959, he was awarded the Premio Bancarella. In the following years, the novel became a bestseller, and by 1988 had sold more than a million copies.

The original manuscript of Gerlach's novel Breakout at Stalingrad was found on 14 February 2012 by Carsten Gansel in the State Military Archives in Moscow. It was published in 2016 as a comprehensive epilogue. The original version of Breakout at Stalingrad distinguishes itself from The Betrayed Army with an increased confrontation with his guilt, conflicts of conscience and self-reflection. According to Gansel, the original version questions and comments less, and the presentation is much more authentic. Gansel sees an unvarnished look. Jochen Hellbeck assumes that Breakthrough at Stalingrad was heavily influenced by concepts of Soviet re-education, which Gerlach had come into contact with as a prisoner of war.

=== Odyssey in Red: Report of a Random Walk ===
In the novel Odyssey in Red, Gerlach used his experience as a long-term prisoner of war and his commitment to the NKFD and the BDO as central themes. In 1970, based on the book, a docudrama for television was shot with the title The House Lunjowo. In 2017, the novel was reissued. In an epilogue, the editor Carsten Gansel explains the results of extensive research on Heinrich Gerlach, which had taken place in the run-up to the new publication.
