= Bra sausage =

Sausage produced in Bra, Piedmont, Italy

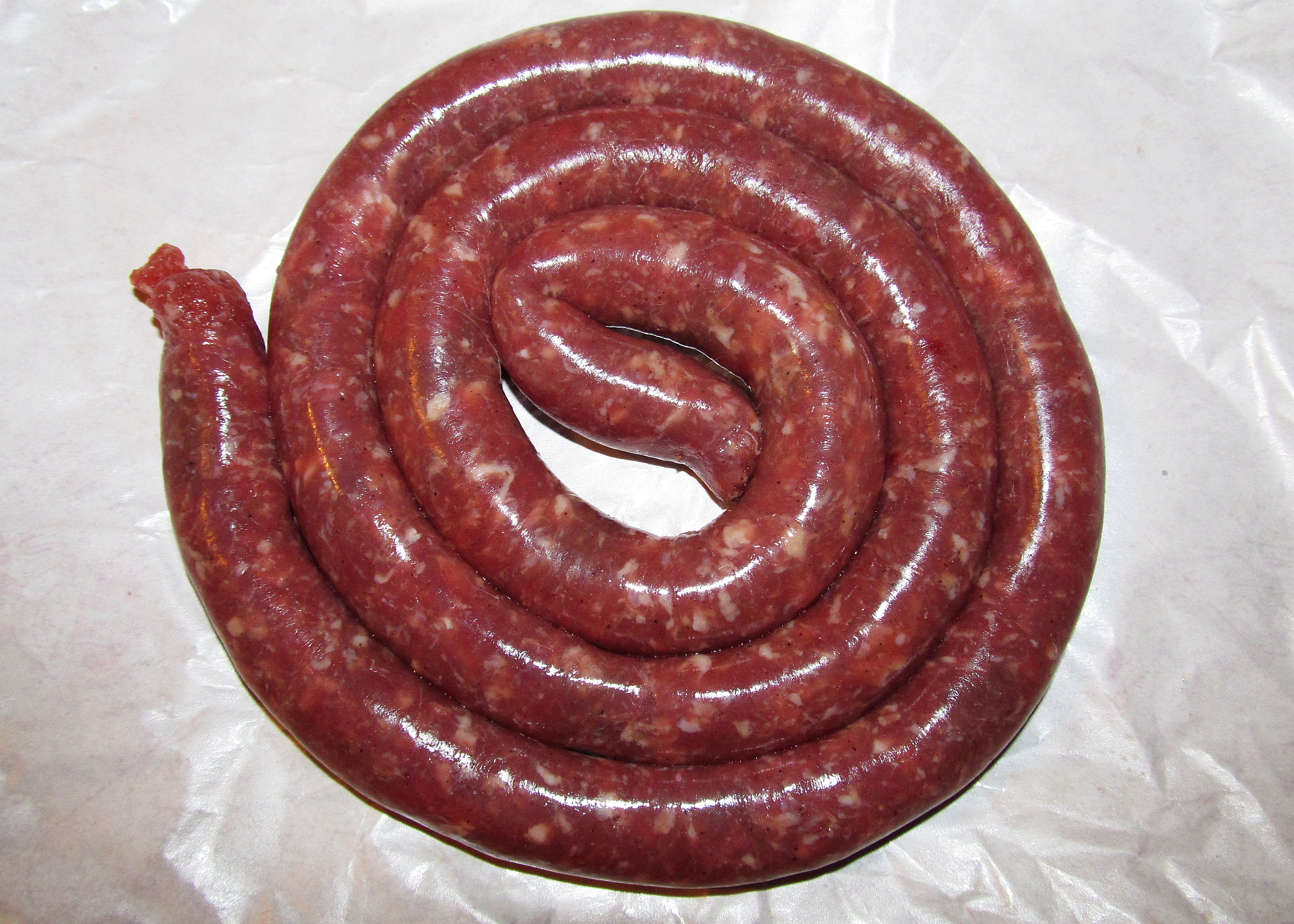
- Alternative names: Sautissa ëd Bra
- Course: Sausage
- Place of origin: Italy
- Region or state: Piedmont
- Serving temperature: Warm
- Main ingredients: Lean beef, spices, pork belly

Bra sausage (Italian: salsiccia di Bra; Piedmontese: sautissa ëd Bra) is an Italian sausage recognized as a prodotto agroalimentare tradizionale (PAT). The sausage is produced exclusively in the comune (municipality) of Bra, Piedmont, by butchers associated with the Consortium for the Protection and Enhancement of Bra Sausage.

== Origin ==
Bra sausage was once produced without using pork fat and was mainly intended for the Jewish community of Cherasco, Piedmont, which supplied itself with meat at the nearby market of Bra. As members of the Jewish religion, they were prevented from consuming pork-based sausages. A royal decree of 1847 acknowledged the Braidese custom allowing the butchers of the municipality to produce fresh beef sausage, which was prohibited in the rest of the country.

== Preparation ==
The sausage is prepared with lean beef (70–80%) and pork fat for the remainder.

== Consumption ==
Bra sausage can be eaten both cooked (in particular on the grill) and raw in the fresh state.
