= Maria Cristina di Savoia Literary Prize =

The Maria Cristina di Savoia Literary Prize was founded in 1963 by the Maria Cristina di Savoia Cultural Meetings organization to reward, every two years, the writers who, in the contemporary literature so widely impacted by a hopeless materialism, give proof – in the full freedom of their artistic expression – of being "sensitive to human and Christian values".

This Prize has a special physiognomy in having a Feminine Central Jury consisting of professional persons, with Second Tier Juries selected in the Meeting held in Italy.

The Prize is named after Queen Maria Cristina of Savoy, wife of Ferdinand of Bourbon who died, considered a saint, in 1836: it also organizes meetings with the participation of some seventy cultural and educational groups active in all parts of Italy. Winner works and authors since 1965:

- 1966 – L'iguana (The Iguana): Anna Maria Ortese. Ex equo with "The Passed Away Glory)": Umberto Cavasso
- 1968 – Dannata beatitudine (Damned Beatitude): Angelo Padellaro
- 1970 – Gli entronauti (The Intronauts): Piero Scanziani
- 1972 – Il diario di Gusen (The Gusen Diary) : Aldo Carpi
- 1974 – La rivolta di Abele (Abel's Revolt) : Giulio Bedeschi
- 1976 – Il figlio (The Son) : Gino Montesanto
- 1978 – La signora Teresa (Mrs. Teresa) : Giovanni Mosca
- 1980 – Faccia da prete (Priest's Face): Caludio Sorgi
- 1982 – Le mura del cielo (The Walls of Heaven) : Ferruccio Ulivi
- 1984 – Galileo mio padre (Galileo, My Father) : Luca Desiato
- 1986 – Cercando l'imperatore (Looking for the Emperor): Roberto Pazzi
- 1988 – Trenta denari (Thirty Coins) : Ferruccio Ulivi
- 1990 – Il caso anima (The Soul Case) : Giorgio De Simone
- 1992 – Konradin (Konradin) : Italo Alighiero Chiusano
- 1994 – Le storie dell'ultimo giorno (Last Day's Stories) : Stefano Jacomuzzi
- 1996 – Cominciò in Galilea (It Began in Galilee) : Stefano Jacomuzzi
- 1998 – Se un Dio pietoso (About a Mercyful God) : Giovanni D'Alessandro
- 2000 – Il miracolo (The Miracle): Vittorio Messori
- 2002 – La dogana del duca (The Duke's Toll): Giuseppe Bianchetti
- 2004 – L'Erede (The Heir) : Roberto Pazzi
- 2006 – 7 km da Gerusalemme (Seven Kilometers from Jerusalem) : Pino Farinotti
- 2008 – Ragionevoli Dubbi (Reasonable Doubts) : Gianrico Carofiglio

== Maria Cristina of Savoy ==
Maria Cristina of Savoia (Cagliari, 14 November 1812 – Naples, 31 January 1836), Princess of the Kingdom of Sardinia, was the youngest daughter of Vittorio Emanuele I of Savoy and Maria Teresa of Habsburg-Este. Raised at the Court of Turin, she is recognized as 'Venerable' by the Catholic Church. In 1832, she married Ferdinando II of the Two Sicilies, becoming the Queen of that Reign. Their wedding was celebrated on 21 November 1832 in the Nostra Signora dell'Acquasanta Sanctuary in Genoa. She died in childbirth on 21 January 1837.
