= Nelida Milani =

Italian writer (born 1939)

Nelida Milani (born Pula, 1939), who also publishes under the name Nelida Milani Kruljac, is an Istrian Italian writer and professor of linguistics and semantics from Croatia. Milani was awarded the Premio Mondello in 1992 for Una valigia di cartone. Jointly with Anna Maria Mori, she was the recipient of the Rapallo Carige Prize for Bora in 1999. In 2022 she was awarded the Pula City Citizens Award.

== Life ==
Milani was born and lives in Pola. Pola was part of Yugoslavia but after the fall of Tito, it is now part of Croatia. Milani was a professor of linguistics and semantics and head of the Department of Italian at the Faculty of Humanities at the Juraj Dobila University of Pula. She was the editor-in-chief of the magazine La Battana. She has written a number of books and collections of short stories. Her works include Insonnia (1987), La partita (1988), Impercettibili passaggi (1989), Una valigia di cartone (1990), Tempo di primavera (1991), and Bora (1998). Themes in Milani's work include bilingualism, marginalisation, trauma and particularly the Istrian-Dalmatian exodus. The 1999 book Bora was jointly written with Anna Maria Mori, and is semi-autobiographical. It compares the stories of the two writers, who were both born in Pola. After the exodus, Milani stayed but Mori left, and the book charts their different experiences of adapting to new circumstances.

Milani is one of five women writers whose life stories are featured in the book Torn Identities: Life Stories at the Border of Italian Literature, by Gregoria Manzin, published by Troubadour Publishing in 2013. The other writers are Kenka Lekovich, Marisa Madieri, Anna Maria Mori and Giuliana Zelco.

== Awards ==
Milani was awarded the Premio Mondello in 1992 for Una valigia di cartone ('A cardboard suitcase'). Jointly with Anna Maria Mori, Milani was the recipient of the Rapallo Carige Prize for Bora in 1999. In 2022 Milani was nominated unanimously by the Assembly of the Italian Community of Pula for the 2022 Pula City Citizens Award.
