= Romana Petri =

Italian writer

Romana Petri (born Romana Pezzetta, Rome, 10 September 1955) is an Italian writer. She was the recipient of the Rapallo Carige Prize for Alle case venie in 1998.
