= Patrizia Bisi =

Italian writer

Patrizia Bisi (born Rome) is an Italian writer. She was the recipient of the Rapallo Carige Prize for Daimon in 2005.
