= Anilda Ibrahimi =

Albanian writer resident in Italy (born 1972)

Anilda Ibrahimi (born Vlorë, 30 April 1972) is an Albanian writer resident in Italy.

Ibrahimi was born in Albania and attended the University of Tirana. She left Albania in 1994 when she moved to Switzerland. In 1997 she moved to Rome, Italy, where she has been living since. Her first novel, Rosso come una sposa, was published in 2008. She has also published L'amore e gli stracci del tempo (2009), Non c'è dolcezza (2012), and Il tuo nome è una promessa (2017).

She was the recipient of the Rapallo Carige Prize for Il tuo nome è una promessa in 2017. A graduate of the University of Tirana, she has lived in Rome since 1997.
