= Premio Bancarella =

Literary award of Italy

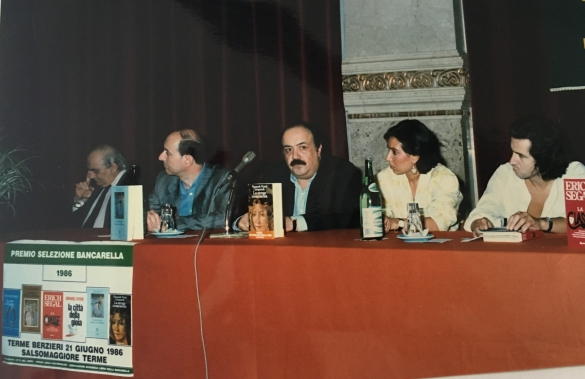

The Premio Bancarella is an Italian literary prize established in 1953. It is given in Pontremoli every year, on either the last Saturday or the last Sunday in July.

Six books are selected and awarded the Premio Selezione Bancarella. The booksellers establish the winner with their vote. The awarding of the prize takes place in the last evening.

Premio Bancarella is at the 72nd edition in 2024.

== List of winners ==
This is a complete list of winners through 2023.

Year	Author	Title	Publisher
1953	Ernest Hemingway	Il vecchio e il mare (The Old Man and the Sea)	Mondadori
1954	Giovannino Guareschi	Don Camillo e il suo gregge	Rizzoli
1955	Hervé Le Boterf	Lo Spretato	ELI
1956	Han Suyin	L'amore è una cosa meravigliosa (A Many-Splendoured Thing)	Martello
1957	Werner Keller	La Bibbia aveva ragione	Garzanti
1958	Boris Pasternak	Il dottor Zivago (Doctor Zhivago)	Feltrinelli
1959	Heinrich Gerlach	L'armata tradita	Garzanti
1960	Bonaventura Tecchi	Gli egoisti	Bompiani
1961	André Schwarz Bart	L'ultimo dei giusti	Feltrinelli
1962	Cornelius Ryan	Il giorno più lungo (The Longest Day)	Garzanti
1963	Paolo Caccia Dominioni	El Alamein	Longanesi
1964	Giulio Bedeschi	Centomila gavette di ghiaccio	Mursia
1965	Luigi Preti	Giovinezza, giovinezza	Mondadori
1966	Vincenzo Pappalettera	Tu passerai per il camino	Mursia
1967	Indro Montanelli, Roberto Gervaso	L'Italia dei Comuni	Rizzoli
1968	Isaac Bashevis Singer	La famiglia Moskat (The Family Moskat)	Longanesi
1969	Peter Kolosimo	Non è terrestre	Sugar
1970	Oriana Fallaci	Niente e così sia	Rizzoli
1971	Enzo Biagi	Testimone del tempo	S.E.I.
1972	Alberto Bevilacqua	Il viaggio misterioso	Rizzoli
1973	Roberto Gervaso	Cagliostro	Rizzoli
1974	Giuseppe Berto	Oh! Serafina	Rusconi
1975	Susanna Agnelli	Vestivamo alla marinara	Mondadori
1976	Carlo Cassola	L'antagonista	Rizzoli
1977	Giorgio Saviane	Eutanasia di un amore	Rizzoli
1978	Alex Haley	Radici (Roots)	Rizzoli
1979	Massimo Grillandi	La contessa di Castiglione	Rusconi
1980	Maurice Denuzière	Luisiana	Rizzoli
1981	Sergio Zavoli	Socialista di Dio	Mondadori
1982	Gary Jennings	L'Azteco (Aztec)	Rizzoli
1983	Renato Barneschi	Vita e morte di Mafalda di Savoia a Buchenwald	Rusconi
1984	Luciano De Crescenzo	Storia della filosofia greca - I Presocratici	Mondadori
1985	Giulio Andreotti	Visti da vicino (3^ serie)	Rizzoli
1986	Pasquale Festa Campanile	La strega innamorata	Bompiani
1987	Enzo Biagi	Il boss è solo	Mondadori
1988	Cesare Marchi	Grandi peccatori, grandi cattedrali	Rizzoli
1989	Umberto Eco	Il pendolo di Focault (Foucault's Pendulum)	Bompiani
1990	Vittorio Sgarbi	Davanti all'immagine	Rizzoli
1991	Antonio Spinosa	Vittorio Emanuele II. L'astuzia di un re	Mondadori
1992	Alberto Bevilacqua	I sensi incantati	Mondadori
1993	Carmen Covito	La bruttina stagionata	Bompiani
1994	John Grisham	Il cliente (The Client)	Mondadori
1995	Jostein Gaarder	Il mondo di Sofia (Sophie's World)	Longanesi
1996	Stefano Zecchi	Sensualità	Mondadori
1997	Giampaolo Pansa	I nostri giorni proibiti	Sperling & Kupfer
1998	Paco Ignacio Taibo II	Senza perdere la tenerezza	Il Saggiatore
1999	Ken Follett	Il martello dell'Eden (The Hammer of Eden)	Mondadori
2000	Michael Connelly	Il ragno (Angels Flight)	Piemme
2001	Andrea Camilleri	La gita a Tindari (Excursion to Tindari)	Sellerio
2002	Federico Audisio	L'uomo che curava con i fiori	Piemme
2003	Alessandra Appiano	Amiche di salvataggio	Sperling & Kupfer
2004	Bruno Vespa	Il cavaliere e il professore	Rai Eri, Mondadori
2005	Gianrico Carofiglio	Il passato è una terra straniera	Rizzoli
2006	Andrea Vitali	La figlia del podestà	Garzanti
2007	Frank Schätzing	Il diavolo nella cattedrale	Nord
2008	Valerio Massimo Manfredi	L'armata perduta	Mondadori
2009	Donato Carrisi	Il Suggeritore	Mondadori
2010	Elizabeth Strout	Olive Kitteridge	Mondadori
2011	Mauro Corona	La Fine del Mondo Storto	Mondadori
2012	Marcello Simoni	Il mercante di libri maledetti	Newton Compton
2013	Anna Premoli	Ti prego lasciati odiare	Newton Compton
2014	Michela Marzano	L'amore è tutto: è tutto ciò che so dell'amore	UTET
2015	Sara Rattaro	Niente è come te	Garzanti
2016	Margherita Oggero	La ragazza di fronte	Mondadori
2017	Matteo Strukul	I Medici. Una dinastia al potere	Newton Compton
2018	Dolores Redondo	Tutto questo ti darò	Dea Planeta
2019	Alessia Gazzola	Il ladro gentiluomo	Longanesi
2020	Angela Marsons	Le verità sepolte	Newton Compton
2021	Ema Stokholma	Per il mio bene	HarperCollins
2022	Stefania Auci	L' inverno dei leoni	Editrice Nord
2023	Francesca Giannone	La portalettere	Editrice Nord
2024	Aurora Tamigio	Il cognome delle donne	Feltrinelli

== Premio Bancarella della Cucina ==
The Premio Bancarella della Cucina, inaugurated in 2006, is awarded by the Fondazione Città del Libro together with the Accademia Italiana della Cucina and is intended to promote the gastronomic traditions and heritage of Italy.^{,}

Winners
Year	Author	Title	Publisher
2006	Ida Li Vigni e Paolo Aldo Rossi	Gola. Mater amatissima	De Ferrari
2007	Elena Kostioukovitch	Perche agli Italiani piace parlare del cibo	Sperlig & Kupfer
2008	June Di Schino and Furio Luccichenti	Il cuoco segreto dei papi	Gangemi
2009	Luisella Ceretta	Le donne e la cucina del ventennio	Susa Libri
2010	Marino Marini	La Gola	Food Editore
2011	Ito Ogawa	Il ristorante dell’amore ritrovato	Neri Pozza
2012	Adriano Ravera and Elma Schena	A tavola nel Risorgimento	Priuli & Verlucca

== Other prizes ==
Other prizes assigned in Pontremoli together with Bancarella are: Premio Bancarellino and Premio Bancarella Sport.
