= Alessandra Appiano =

Italian novelist and journalist

- Born: 30 May 1959; Asti, Montferrat, Italy
- Died: 3 June 2018 (aged 59); Milan, Italy
- Occupations: Novelist, journalist and televist host
- Partner: Nanni Delbecchi
- Writing career
- Notable works: Amiche di salvataggio; Domani ti perdono; Scegli me; Le vie delle signore sono infinite; Le belle e le Bestie
- Notable awards: Premio Bancarella Award (2003)

Alessandra Appiano (30 May 1959 – 3 June 2018) was an Italian novelist, journalist and television host. With her first novel Amiche di salvataggio she won the Premio Bancarella Award in 2003. Appiano wrote six more novels, which were translated into several languages, and edited a column in a weekly women's magazine.

== Career ==
Appiano was a novelist, journalist and television host. Her first novel, Amiche di salvataggio, was published in 2002, and she won the Premio Bancarella Award the following year.

Amiche di salvataggio was published by Sperling & Kupfer. For the same publishing house, she wrote other books including Domani ti perdono (2003), Scegli me (2005), Le vie delle signore sono infinite (2006) and Le belle e le Bestie (2007), four other novels describing the feminine universe of our time, also being translated into France, Germany, Portugal, Russia, Poland, Lithuania and Spain.

Appiano published for Garzanti Il cerchio degli amori sospesi (2010) and Solo un uomo (2013), and Ti meriti un amore (2017). Her last book, published by Cairo, retold the news story of the murder of Gloria Rosboch, a teacher who was killed by a student in Turin in 2016. Appiano edited a column called Amiche di salvataggio in the weekly magazine Donna Moderna.

She was honoured in 2013 in Milan for her writing with the Ambrogino d’oro.

== Personal life ==
Alessandra Appiano was born in Asti on 30 May 1959.

Appiano's partner was writer and journalist Nanni Delbecchi. She died by suicide on 3 June 2018 in Milan at the age of 59.
