= Gina Lagorio =

Italian writer

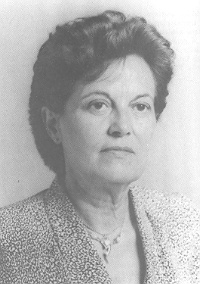
Gina Lagorio

Gina Lagorio (June 18, 1922, in Bra – July 17, 2005, in Milan) was an Italian writer. She was the recipient of the Rapallo Carige Prize for Golfo del paradiso in 1987.
