= Verda =

Verda may refer to:

== People ==
=== Mononym ===
- Saint Verda, 4th-century Persian martyr

=== Surname ===
- Sandra Verda (1959–2014), Italian writer

=== Given name ===
- Verda Erman (1944–2014), Turkish classical pianist
- Verda Smith (1923–2000), American National Football League running back for the Los Angeles Rams
- Verda Ün (1919–2011), Turkish female classical pianist
- Verda Freeman Welcome (1907–1990), American teacher, civil rights leader, and Maryland state senator

== Places ==
- Puig de la Collada Verda, a mountain of Catalonia, Spain
- Verda, Kentucky, a community in Harlan County, Kentucky, United States
- Verda, Louisiana, a community in Grant Parish, Louisiana, United States
