= Sara Rattaro =

Italian writer (born 1975)

Sara Rattaro (born Genoa, 9 June 1975) is an Italian writer.

== Biography ==
Sara Rattaro holds degrees in Biology (1999) and Communication Studies (2009), both from the University of Genoa. She worked as a pharmaceutical representative for some years before switching to full-time writing.

Her novels mainly deal with women's lives, feelings and challenges. Spousal abuse, motherhood, family bonds are among the themes she explores in her writing. She was awarded the Premio Bancarella for Niente è come te in 2015. She was the recipient of the Rapallo Carige Prize for Splendi più che puoi in 2016. Her novels have been translated in several languages, among them Spanish, German, Dutch and Russian. In 2017, her first children's book, Il cacciatore di sogni was published.

== Novels ==
- Sulla sedia sbagliata, Milan: Morellini, 2010
- Un uso qualunque di te, Florence: Giunti, 2012
- Non volare via, Milan: Garzanti Editore 2013
- Niente è come te, Milan: Garzanti Editore 2014
- Splendi più che puoi, Milan: Garzanti Editore 2016
- L'amore addosso, Milan: Sperling & Kupfer, 2017
- Il cacciatore di sogni, Milan: Mondadori, 2017
- Uomini che restano, Milan: Sperling & Kupfer, 2018
- Sentirai parlare di me, Milan: Mondadori, 2019

== Awards ==
- 2014 - Premio Città di Rieti
- 2015 - Premio Bancarella
- 2015 - Premio Rhegium Julii - "Fortunato Seminara" Special Award
- 2016 - Rapallo Carige Prize
- 2017 - Fenice Europa Prize
