= Carsten Gansel =

German literary scholar

Carsten Gansel (born 21 November 1955) is a German literary scholar and university teacher. He is professor of modern German literature and German literature and media didactics at the University of Giessen. In 2012, he discovered the original manuscript of Heinrich Gerlach's semi-autobiographical novel of the Battle of Stalingrad, The Forsaken Army, in the Russian State Military Archive.

Carsten Gansel is a member of the PEN-Zentrum Deutschland, the Verband deutscher Schriftstellerinnen und Schriftsteller (VS) and chairman of the jury for the Uwe-Johnson-Prize as well as the Uwe-Johnson-Förderpreis. He is also a member of the scientific advisory board of the Arbeitsstelle für Lessing-Rezeption Kamenz and a founding member of the International Christa Wolf Center (research center for German and Polish contemporary literature and culture). In December 1989, Carsten Gansel was a co-founder of the Mecklenburg Literary Society, which is particularly committed to the novels of Uwe Johnson. He has been its chairman since 1992.
