= Brunella Schisa =

Italian novelist and journalist

Brunella Schisa (born Naples, 20 October 1953) is an Italian novelist and journalist. She was the recipient of the Rapallo Carige Prize for La donna in nero in 2007.
