= Renata Pisu =

Italian writer (born 1935)

Renata Pisu (born Rome, 4 September 1935) is an Italian writer. She was the recipient of the Rapallo Carige Prize for La via della Cina in 2000.
