= Virginia Galante Garrone =

Italian writer

Virginia Galante Garrone (20 January 1906 in Vercelli – 2 January 1998 in Turin) was an Italian writer. She was the recipient of the inaugural Rapallo Carige Prize for L'ora del tempo in 1985.
