= Benedetta Cibrario =

Italian writer

Benedetta Cibrario (born 1962 in Florence) is an Italian writer. She was the recipient of the Rapallo Carige Prize for Sotto cieli noncuranti in 2010.

== Biography ==
Benedetta Cibrario was born in Florence in 1962, to a father from Turin and a mother from Naples.He lived in several Italian cities before arriving with his family in Piedmont, in a village in the Upper Susa Valley, then moving to Turin, where he attended the Massimo d'Azeglio classical high school. She graduated in Film History and Criticism with Gianni Rondolino, with a thesis on Michael Powell and Emeric Pressburger. During his college years, he worked at the Giornale dell'Arte, collaborated occasionally with the Espresso and attended, without graduating, the Archivistics, Paleography and Diplomatics course at the State Archives in Turin. Married, with four children, for family and professional needs she began to divide herself repeatedly between Italy (Milan and the Grosseto countryside) and England (London and Oxford). The years of travel abroad were decisive for Benedetta Cibrario, who began gathering material for a novel focused on the theme of the relationship between the individual and history, focusing not only on themes that would return in later novels but also experimenting with writing techniques more or less explicitly suggested by her years of film studies.

In 2007 he made his debut with Rossovermiglio (Feltrinelli, 2007), Premio Campiello 2008. Rossovermiglio, a coming-of-age novel with interwar Italy and the 1946 referendum as its background, has been translated and published in several countries, including Germany, Holland, Portugal, and Greece.

In 2009, also for Feltrinelli, came out Sotto cieli noncuranti, 2010 Rapallo Carige Prize. The novel is a winter tale with a contemporary setting, in which the episode of a child's death is the focus around which several female voices revolve, each more or less involved and committed to confronting the intolerability of grief.

In 2011, Cibrario returned to the theme of the relationship between the individual and history with a short novel entitled Lo Scurnuso (Feltrinelli, 2011) considered by Elisabetta Rasy almost “a musical composition” because of its division into three parts, to which correspond three different expressive registers. In Lo Scurnuso the writer “loves Naples from afar” as Raffaele La Capria writes in Corriere della Sera.

In 2019, he won the Basilicata Literary Prize with the novel The Noise of the World. On November 24, 2019, he won the 11th Asti d'Appello Prize.

== Works ==
- Rossovermiglio, (Feltrinelli, 2007)
- Sotto cieli noncuranti, (Feltrinelli, 2010)
- Lo Scurnuso, (Feltrinelli, 2011)
