= Carlotta Guiducci =

Italian bio-engineer

Professor Carlotta Guiducci
- Born: 1977 (age 48–49)
- Citizenship: Italy
- Occupation: Principal investigator
- Awards: Intel Early Career Faculty Honor Program Award

Academic background
- Education: Electrical engineering Electronic engineering
- Alma mater: University of Bologna

Academic work
- Discipline: Engineering
- Sub-discipline: Bio-engineering
- Institutions: École Polytechnique Fédérale de Lausanne (EPFL)
- Main interests: Analytical microsystems Lab-on-a-chip devices Portable DNA-based analytics
- Website: https://clse.epfl.ch/

Carlotta Guiducci (born 1977) is an Italian electrical engineer and bioengineer. She is an Associate Professor at the École Polytechnique Fédérale de Lausanne (EPFL), Switzerland, where she directs the Laboratory of Life Sciences Electronics (CLSE). Her research focuses on microfluidic and electronic technologies for biomedical analysis, including biosensors, electrokinetic methods for cell manipulation, single-cell biophysics, and miniaturized diagnostic systems.

== Career and Education ==
Guiducci studied electrical and electronics engineering at University of Bologna, Italy, where she received her master's degree in 2001 and her PhD in Electrical Engineering in 2005. Her doctoral research focused on semiconductor-based biosensors and integrated electronic technologies for molecular detection.

Following her doctorate, she conducted postdoctoral research at the Laboratory of Nanobiophysics at ESPCI in Paris, France. She subsequently returned to the University of Bologna as a research associate and lecturer.

In 2009, she joined EPFL as a tenure-track Assistant Professor and established the Laboratory of Life Science Electronics. She was promoted to Associate Professor in 2018. Her academic appointments have been associated with EPFL's Institute of Bioengineering (IBI) and the Institute of Electrical and Micro Engineering (IEM).

== Research ==
Guiducci's research combines electrical engineering, microtechnology, microfluidics, and biophysics to develop methods and devices for biological analysis and medical diagnostics.

Her early research focused on semiconductor-based biosensors, particularly the development of integrated electronic devices for label-free detection of DNA and other biomolecules. This work included the use of CMOS technologies for molecular sensing and the development of miniaturized analytical platforms.

At EPFL, her research expanded to integrated microfluidic and optical sensing technologies for molecular analysis, including the detection and quantification of therapeutic drugs in biological fluids. These developments have been investigated for applications in therapeutic drug monitoring and personalized medicine.

A major area of her research concerns microfluidic technologies for single-cell analysis and manipulation. Her laboratory has developed microsystems combining electrical impedance sensing, dielectrophoresis, and electrorotation to investigate the electrical and dielectric properties of biological cells. These approaches have been applied to cell characterization, separation, and selective retrieval, including studies involving immune cells and neurons.

Her research also addresses the separation and characterization of biological particles using electrokinetic methods, including the integration of dielectrophoresis with microfluidic separation techniques.

Another area of research concerns the development of miniaturized diagnostic systems for clinical applications. This includes technologies for the detection of biomarkers associated with pregnancy and preterm birth, as well as microfluidic analytical methods for measuring biomarkers in small-volume biological samples.

== Academic and professional activities ==
Guiducci has served in scientific, academic, and professional organizations related to biomedical engineering and microtechnology.

She was an elected member of the Administrative Committee of the IEEE Engineering in Medicine and Biology Society (EMBS) for two terms between 2020 and 2024. She has been an IEEE Senior Member since 2016.

Since 2020, she has served as a member of the Cantonal Research Ethics Committee of Vaud (CER-VD), Switzerland, which evaluates research involving human participants.

At EPFL, she has participated in academic governance, faculty recruitment, doctoral education, and curriculum development. She directs the Minor in Biomedical Technologies and teaches courses in electrical engineering, biosensors, and biochip technologies.

She has also served on scientific evaluation panels and doctoral examination committees at EPFL and other institutions.

== Selected works ==
- Ryser, Till; Krichene, Ata; Marchi, Nicolò; Espinal, Felix Rodriguez; Mahul-Mellier, Anne-Laure; Lashuel, Hilal A.; Guiducci, Carlotta (2026-06-10). "A microfluidic platform for whole-membrane integrity profiling in live neuronal cells". Microsystems & Nanoengineering. 12 (1) 225. Bibcode:2026MicNa..12..225R. doi:10.1038/s41378-026-01209-0. ISSN 2055-7434. PMC 13249814. PMID 42265078.
- Porro, Gloria; Cristofori, Micaela Siria; Gagnieux, Céline; Pennati, Elia; Thiriet, Pierre-Emmanuel; Constam, Daniel; Guiducci, Carlotta (2026-07-14). "Self-Contained Lateral-Flow Microfluidic Bead-Based Assay for Rapid Quantification of Early-Stage Kidney Biomarkers". Analytical Chemistry. 98 (27): 20204–20217. Bibcode:2026AnaCh..9820204P. doi:10.1021/acs.analchem.6c01144. ISSN 0003-2700. PMC 13373927. PMID 42383504.
- Porro, Gloria; Ryser, Till; Thiriet, Pierre-Emmanuel; Cristofori, Micaela Siria; Guiducci, Carlotta (2024-10-07). "Electrokinetic microdevices for biological sample processing". Nature Reviews Electrical Engineering. 1 (12): 768–787. doi:10.1038/s44287-024-00099-6. ISSN 2948-1201.
- Porro, Gloria; Sarkis, Rita; Obergozo, Clara; Godot, Lucie; Amato, Francesco; Humbert, Magali; Naveiras, Olaia; Guiducci, Carlotta (2023-12-18). "MarrowCellDLD: a microfluidic method for label-free retrieval of fragile bone marrow-derived cells". Scientific Reports. 13 (1) 22462. Bibcode:2023NatSR..1322462P. doi:10.1038/s41598-023-47978-w. ISSN 2045-2322. PMC 10725893. PMID 38105340.
- Tomar, Saurabh; Lavickova, Barbora; Guiducci, Carlotta (2022). "Recombinase polymerase amplification in minimally buffered conditions". Biosensors and Bioelectronics. 198 113802. doi:10.1016/j.bios.2021.113802. PMID 34847361.
- Thiriet, Pierre-Emmanuel; Pezoldt, Joern; Gambardella, Gabriele; Keim, Kevin; Deplancke, Bart; Guiducci, Carlotta (2020-03-20). "Selective Retrieval of Individual Cells from Microfluidic Arrays Combining Dielectrophoretic Force and Directed Hydrodynamic Flow". Micromachines. 11 (3): 322. doi:10.3390/mi11030322. ISSN 2072-666X. PMC 7143322. PMID 32244902.
- Beech, Jason P.; Keim, Kevin; Ho, Bao Dang; Guiducci, Carlotta; Tegenfeldt, Jonas O. (2019). "Active Posts in Deterministic Lateral Displacement Devices". Advanced Materials Technologies. 4 (9) 1900339. doi:10.1002/admt.201900339. ISSN 2365-709X.
- Keim, Kevin; Rashed, Mohamed Z.; Kilchenmann, Samuel C.; Delattre, Aurélien; Gonçalves, António F.; Éry, Paul; Guiducci, Carlotta (2019). "On-chip technology for single-cell arraying, electrorotation-based analysis and selective release". Electrophoresis. 40 (14): 1830–1838. doi:10.1002/elps.201900097. ISSN 0173-0835. PMC 6771916. PMID 31111973.
- Rollo, Enrica; Tenaglia, Enrico; Genolet, Raphaël; Bianchi, Elena; Harari, Alexandre; Coukos, George; Guiducci, Carlotta (2017). "Label-free identification of activated T lymphocytes through tridimensional microsensors on chip". Biosensors and Bioelectronics. 94: 193–199. doi:10.1016/j.bios.2017.02.047. PMID 28284079.
- Cappi, Giulia; Spiga, Fabio M.; Moncada, Yessica; Ferretti, Anna; Beyeler, Michael; Bianchessi, Marco; Decosterd, Laurent; Buclin, Thierry; Guiducci, Carlotta (2015). "Label-Free Detection of Tobramycin in Serum by Transmission-Localized Surface Plasmon Resonance". Analytical Chemistry. 87 (10): 5278–5285. Bibcode:2015AnaCh..87.5278C. doi:10.1021/acs.analchem.5b00389. ISSN 0003-2700. PMID 25811093.
- Spiga, Fabio M.; Maietta, Paolo; Guiducci, Carlotta (2015). "More DNA–Aptamers for Small Drugs: A Capture–SELEX Coupled with Surface Plasmon Resonance and High-Throughput Sequencing". ACS Combinatorial Science. 17 (5): 326–333. doi:10.1021/acscombsci.5b00023. ISSN 2156-8952. PMID 25875077.
- Temiz, Yuksel; Ferretti, Anna; Leblebici, Yusuf; Guiducci, Carlotta (2012). "A comparative study on fabrication techniques for on-chip microelectrodes". Lab on a Chip. 12 (22): 4920–4928. doi:10.1039/c2lc40582b. ISSN 1473-0197. PMID 23042440.
- Cagnin, Stefano; Caraballo, Marcelo; Guiducci, Carlotta; Martini, Paolo; Ross, Marty; Santaana, Mark; Danley, David; West, Todd; Lanfranchi, Gerolamo (2009). "Overview of Electrochemical DNA Biosensors: New Approaches to Detect the Expression of Life". Sensors. 9 (4): 3122–3148. Bibcode:2009Senso...9.3122C. doi:10.3390/s90403122. PMC 3348825. PMID 22574066.
- Stagni, Claudio; Guiducci, Carlotta; Benini, Luca; Ricco, Bruno; Carrara, Sandro; Paulus, Christian; Schienle, Meinrad; Thewes, Roland (2007). "A Fully Electronic Label-Free DNA Sensor Chip". IEEE Sensors Journal. 7 (4): 577–585. Bibcode:2007ISenJ...7..577S. doi:10.1109/JSEN.2007.891990. S2CID 32564939.
- Stagni, Claudio; Guiducci, Carlotta; Benini, Luca; Ricco, Bruno; Carrara, Sandro; Samori, Bruno; Paulus, Christian; Schienle, Meinrad; Augustyniak, Marcin; Thewes, Roland (2006). "CMOS DNA Sensor Array with Integrated A/D Conversion Based on Label-Free Capacitance Measurement". IEEE Journal of Solid-State Circuits. 41 (12): 2956–2964. Bibcode:2006IJSSC..41.2956S. doi:10.1109/JSSC.2006.884867. S2CID 41863919.
- Benini, L.; Farella, E.; Guiducci, C. (2006). "Wireless sensor networks: Enabling technology for ambient intelligence". Microelectronics Journal. 37 (12): 1639–1649. doi:10.1016/j.mejo.2006.04.021.
- Guiducci, C.; Stagni, C.; Zuccheri, G.; Bogliolo, A.; Benini, L.; Samorì, B.; Riccò, B. (2004). "DNA detection by integrable electronics". Biosensors and Bioelectronics. 19 (8): 781–787. doi:10.1016/S0956-5663(03)00266-5. PMID 15128096.
- Guiducci, C. (2004). "DNA detection by integrable electronics". Biosensors and Bioelectronics. 19 (8): 781–787. doi:10.1016/S0956-5663(03)00266-5. PMID 15128096.
- Lime, F.; Guiducci, C.; Clerc, R.; Ghibaudo, G.; Leroux, C.; Ernst, T. (2003). "Characterization of effective mobility by split C(V) technique in N-MOSFETs with ultra-thin gate oxides". Solid-State Electronics. 47 (7): 1147–1153. Bibcode:2003SSEle..47.1147L. doi:10.1016/S0038-1101(03)00049-2.
