= Armanda Guiducci =

Italian writer

Armanda Guiducci (Naples, 12 October 1923 - Milan, 8 December 1992) was an Italian writer, literary critic, and Marxist feminist. She was a major player in the feminist debates of the 1970s. She was the recipient of the Rapallo Carige Prize for Virginia e l'angelo in 1991.
