= Valentina D'Urbano =

Italian writer and illustrator

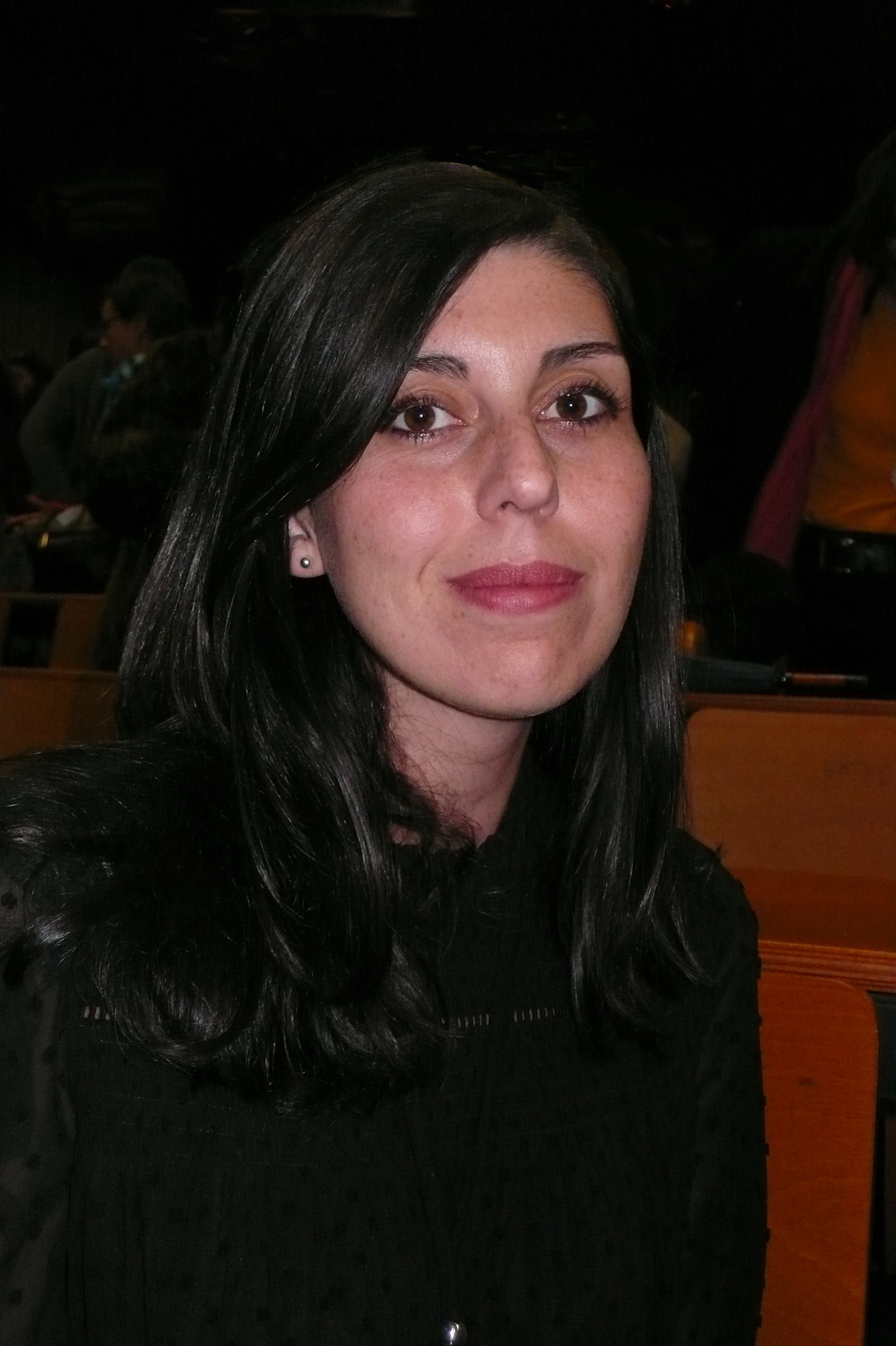
Valentina D'Urbano in 2016.

Valentina D'Urbano (born 28 June 1985) is an Italian writer and illustrator. She was the recipient of the Rapallo Carige Prize for Quella vita che ci manca in 2015.

== Biography ==
Valentina D'Urbano was born in Rome in 1985, where she lives and works. She graduated from Istituto Europeo di Design in illustration and multimedia animation.

In 2010 she won the first edition of the IoScrittore literary tournament organized by the Mauri Spagnol Publishing Group. Her first novel, The Sound of Your Footsteps, which became a bestseller, was published by Longanesi in May 2012, and was translated in France (under the title Le Bruit de tes pas) and Germany. The release of her third novel, That Life We Miss, once again for Longanesi, took place in October 2014. Parallel to her activity as a writer Valentina D'Urbano collaborates as an illustrator for children with several Italian and foreign publishing houses. In 2015 she published Alfredo, followed by Non aspettare la notte (2016) and Isola di neve (2018), all for Longanesi. In 2021 she published for the first time with Mondadori, with the novel Tre gocce d'acqua. A second novel for Mondadori, Figlia del temporale, was released in 2024.
