= Federica Manzon =

Italian writer

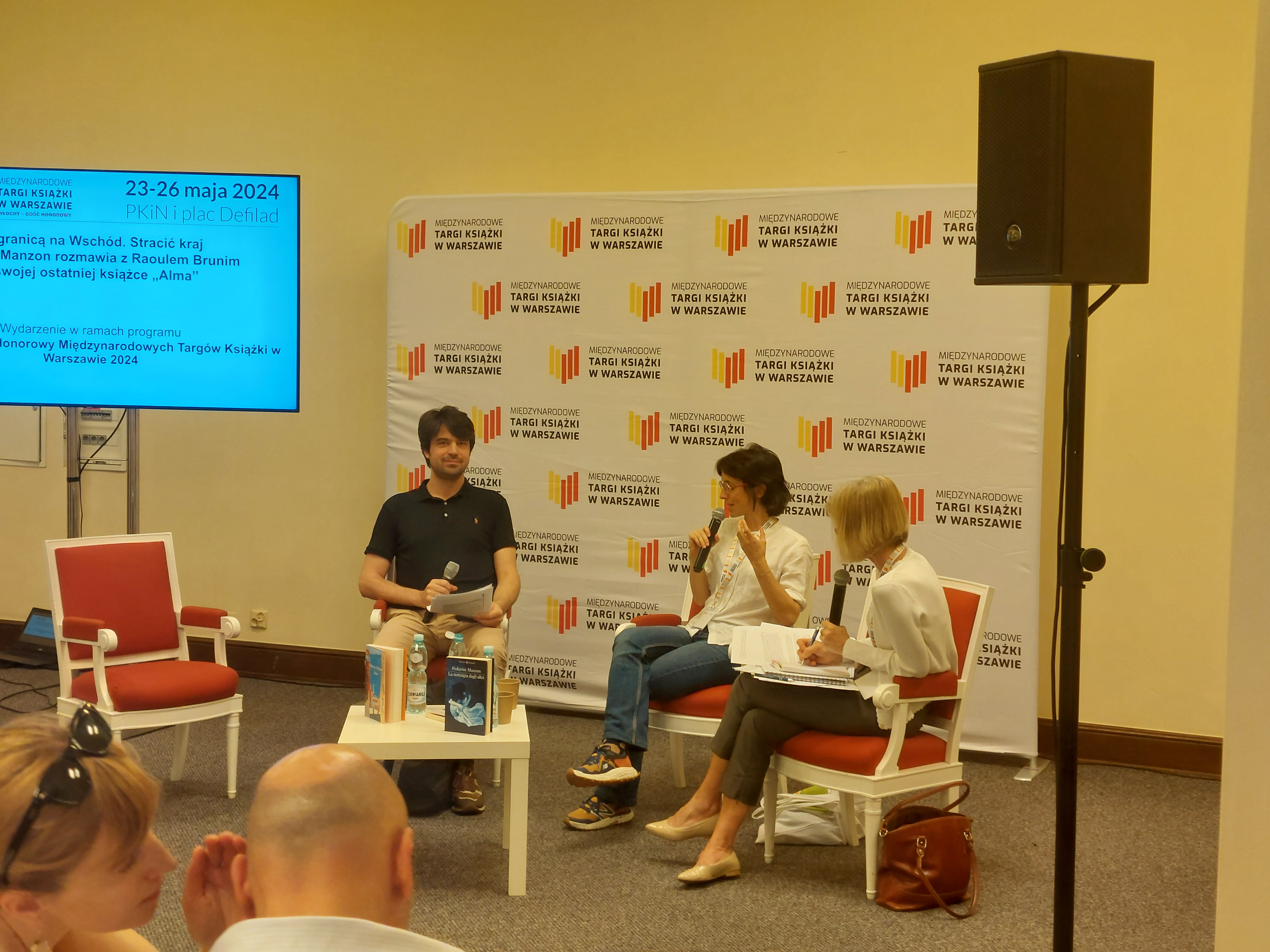
- Federica Manzon during Warsaw International Book Fair 2024
- Born: 2 October 1981 (age 44); Pordenone, Italy
- Education: University of Trieste
- Writing career
- Language: Italian

Federica Manzon (born Pordenone, 2 October 1981) is an Italian writer. She was the recipient of the Rapallo Carige Prize for Di fama e di sventura in 2011 and of the Premio Campiello for Alma in 2024.

== Biography ==
Federica Manzon was born in 1981 in Pordenone and lives between Milan and Trieste, where she graduated in Contemporary Philosophy from the university. She published her short stories in the magazine Nuovi Argomenti (of which she was editor) and in the Italian webzine Carmilla online before making her debut in 2008 with the anthology Tu sei lei and the novel Come si dice addio. In 2011, her second novel, Di fama e di sventura (Of Fame and Misfortune), won the Rapallo Carige Prize for female writers and was among the five finalists for the Campiello Prize. In 2015, she edited the collective volume I mari di Trieste (The Seas of Trieste). She was editor of foreign fiction at Mondadori and subsequently lecturer and head of teaching at the Scuola Holden in Turin. She contributes to various publications, including the daily newspaper Il Piccolo and Tuttolibri della Stampa, and has previously collaborated with the organizers of the literary festival Pordenonelegge.it. She was editorial consultant for foreign fiction in the Mediterranea series published by Crocetti editore and is currently editorial director at Guanda. With her fifth novel, Alma, she won the Premio Campiello, the Stresa Prize, the Alassio Prize, and the Latisana Prize for the Northeast in 2024.
