= Adriana Cavarero =

Italian philosopher and feminist thinker (born 1974)

- Born: 1947 (age 78–79); Bra, Italy

Philosophical work
- Era: Contemporary philosophy
- Region: Western Philosophy
- Main interests: Feminism, political philosophy

Adriana Cavarero (born 1947) is an Italian philosopher and feminist thinker. She holds the title of Professor of Political Philosophy at the Università degli studi di Verona. She has also held visiting appointments at the University of California, Berkeley and Santa Barbara, at the New York University and Harvard. Cavarero is widely recognized in Italy, Europe and the English-speaking world for her writings on feminism and theories of sexual difference, on Plato, on Hannah Arendt, on theories of narration and on a wide range of issues in political philosophy and literature.

== Biography ==
Cavarero was born in Bra, Italy and educated at the University of Padua, where she wrote a thesis on philosophy and poetry in 1971. In 1983 she left Padua for the University of Verona, where she was co-founder of Diotima – a group dedicated to feminist philosophy as political engagement. Trained in ancient philosophy – with a special focus on the writings of Plato – and inspired by feminist philosopher, Luce Irigaray, Cavarero first drew wide attention with her book, In Spite of Plato, which pursues two interwoven themes: it engages in a deconstruction of ancient philosophical texts, primarily of Plato, but also of Homer and Parmenides, in order to free four Greek female figures (a Thracian servant, Penelope, Demeter and Diotima) from the patriarchal discourse which for centuries had imprisoned them in a domestic role. Secondly, it attempts to construct a symbolic female order, reinterpreting these figures from a new perspective. By contaminating the theory of sexual difference with Arendtian issues, Cavarero shows that, while death is the central category on which the whole edifice of traditional philosophy has been based, the category of birth provides the thread with which new concepts of feminist criticism can be woven together to establish a fresh way of thinking.

== Work ==
Cavarero's interest in the intersection of political philosophy and feminist thought was further developed in Stately Bodies which examines the bodily metaphor in political discourse and in fictional depictions of politics, including Sophocles' Antigone, Plato's Timaeus, Shakespeare's Hamlet, Hobbes' Leviathan, Maria Zambrano's The Tomb of Antigone and Ingeborg Bachmann's Undine Goes. The book explores:

the remarkable paradox whereby politics expels the body from its foundational categories while for thousands of years the political order has been figured precisely through the metaphor of the body.

=== Relating Narratives: Storytelling and Selfhood (2000) ===
Definitively influenced by the work of Hannah Arendt, Cavarero wrote Relating Narratives: Storytelling and Selfhood in which she developed an original theory of selfhood as a "narratable self". Appreciated and discussed by Judith Butler in Giving an Account of Oneself, this book, by contrasting the sovereign subject of the metaphysical tradition, confronts with the urge of rethinking politics and ethics in terms of a relational ontology, characterized by reciprocal exposure, dependence and vulnerability of an incarnated self who postulates the other as necessary. In fact, through readings of such diverse figures as Homer, Sophocles, The Arabian Nights, Isak Dinesen and Gertrude Stein, Relating Narratives presents a singular contribution to the intersection of narrative theory, ethics and political discourse.

Cavarero claims that we perceive ourselves as narratable, as protagonists of a story that we long to hear from others. This desire for a story, for our story to be told, becomes the guiding element in the new approach to identity. Our identity is not possessed in advance, as an innate quality or inner self that we are able to master and express. It is rather the outcome of a relational practice, something given to us from another, in the form of a life-story, a biography.

=== For More Than One Voice: Toward a Philosophy of Vocal Expression (2005) ===
Cavarero's next book, For More Than One Voice: Toward a Philosophy of Vocal Expression, "re-think(s) the relation between speech and politics – announced in Aristotle's formula whereby man's nature as a political animal [zoon politikon] is bound up with man's characterization as that animal which has speech [zoon logon echon] – by focusing her attention on the embodied uniqueness of the speaker as it is manifested in that speaker's voice, addressed to another. In this way, she radically departs from more traditional conceptions of what constitutes 'political speech,' such as the signifying capacity of the speaker, the communicative capacity of discourse, or the semantic content of a given statement. As in her earlier work, Cavarero continues to develop and deepen a number of themes foregrounded by Hannah Arendt—who asserts in The Human Condition that what matters in speech is not signification or 'communication' but rather the fact that 'in acting and speaking, men show who they are, reveal actively their unique personal identities and thus make their appearance in the human world.'. Refining the radically phenomenological perspective that Arendt puts forth in her work, Cavarero locates the political sense of speech in the singularity of the speaker's voice, the acoustic emission that emits from mouth to ear. For Cavarero this politic emerges from 'the reciprocal communication of voices,' wherein what comes to the fore is above all the embodied singularity of the speakers in relation to others, no matter what they say.

=== Horrorism: Naming Contemporary Violence (2008) ===
In her book, Horrorism: Naming Contemporary Violence, Cavarero draws attention to various ways in which scenes of violence from the past century through the present (as well as what might be called ancient and early modern precursors to these scenes) cannot be adequately understood through the received categories of modern political philosophy -- 'terrorism,' 'war,' 'friend/enemy,' or 'state versus non-state sanctioned actions' -- and proposes a decisive shift in perspective. Taking note of the fact that, increasingly, we are dealing with victims who are almost all unarmed or defenseless – "inermi," defenseless/helpless – she argues that it is precisely this helplessness and these particular helpless people whose conditions and circumstances ought to orient our thinking about scenes of violence, rather than the socio-political aims or psychoanalytical perspectives of the perpetrators. Cavarero proposes the name "horrorism" for those forms of violence that are "crimes" which "offend the human condition at its ontological level." Pairing, unexpectedly, Hannah Arendt's notion of natality and Thomas Hobbes' description of maternal dominion as the power to "nourish or destroy," Cavarero elaborates this ontology as one of "vulnerability" – a reciprocal exposure in which we are given over to either the other's care or harm, "almost as if the absence of harm or care were not even thinkable". The argues that it is precisely this alternative between care and doing harm – and not some "pure, gratuitous cruelty" – that is the "generative nucleus" of horror, precisely because this vulnerability is the condition of human life as it is given from birth to death. Horrorism is, so to speak, a radical rejection of care – a wound inflicted precisely where care was most needed. Therefore, the violence strikes more deeply at the "dignity" of the unique, bodily life that is harmed; or better, because horror is a form of violence that is made possible by the heightened vulnerability of helplessness, it also implicitly reveals this dignity.

=== Inclinations: A Critique of Rectitude (2016) ===
Adriana Cavarero's Inclinations critiques the characterization of the human being as upright, erect—in philosophy, psychoanalysis, anthropological writings, literature and artworks. Her aim is to illuminate "the effects of this figuration, the 'truths' and 'power-relations' that these discursive or artistic figurations produce and install…[and to tally] the costs of depicting the human being as upright when it comes to our view of women, our overall understanding and collective self-conception." The figuration of the human being as 'upright,' Cavarero suggests, obscures a more natural figuration: Inclination. In this book, she hones a "rhetoric of inclination," in order to superimpose it "like a transparent screen, over the rhetoric of the philosophical subject, to highlight the differences between the two ontological, ethical, and political models."

== Bibliography ==
- In Spite of Plato (1995) ISBN 978-0-415-91447-5
- Relating Narratives (2000) ISBN 978-0-415-20058-5
- Stately Bodies (2002) ISBN 978-0-472-09674-9
- For more than one voice Stanford University Press (2005) ISBN 978-0-8047-4955-8
- Horrorism: naming contemporary violence Columbia University Press (2008) ISBN 978-0-231-14456-8
- Inclinations: A Critique of Rectitude Stanford University Press (2016) ISBN 978-1-503-60040-9
