= Caterina Bonvicini =

Italian writer

Caterina Bonvicini (born 27 November 1974, in Florence) is an Italian writer. She was the recipient of the Rapallo Carige Prize for L'equilibrio degli squali in 2008. Her work has been translated into French.

== Early life and education ==
grew up in Bologna where she graduated in Modern Literature at the University of Bologna.

== Career ==
From 1999 to 2006, she lived in Turin, where she worked for the Einaudi publishing house. Lives and works between Rome and Milan.

From 2012 to 2016, she collaborated with Il Fatto Quotidiano. And for a few years with Robinson, La Repubblica. Since 2016 he has collaborated with L'Espresso.

He published with Einaudi the novels Penelope per gioco (2000) (Premio Letterario Edoardo Kihlgren, Premio Città di Penne, Premio Rapallo-Carige opera prima), Di corsa (2003) Premio Fiesole Narrativa Under 40. prize, and the collection of short stories I figli degli altri (2006).

With the novel L'equilibrio degli squali (The Balance of Sharks), published by Garzanti in 2008 and republished with Oscar Mondadori in 2018, she won the Rapallo Carige Prize for women writers, the Fregene Prize for fiction and the Frignano Literary Prize, in the same year. The novel was translated in Spain (2009, Alfaguara), Germany (2010, Fischer Verlag.), Holland (2010, De Geus.), Turkey (2010, Renzi Kitabevi.) and France (2010, Gallimard.), where it won the international Grand prix de l'héroïne Madame Figaro award in 2010.

In 2010, Il sorriso lento ( Garzanti. URL accessed May 24, 2019 (archived from the original url on November 16, 2016).) which in 2011 was a finalist for the Bottari Lattes Grinzane Prize and was translated in France (Gallimard, 2011) and in Holland (De Geus., 2012).

In 2014, Correva l'anno del nostro amore (Garzanti) was published, translated in France (Gallimard. 2016 and in the Folio in 2018), Germany (Fischer Verlage., 2016) and the United States (Other Press, 2021).

== Works ==
- Penelope per gioco, Einaudi, 2000.
- Di corsa, Einaudi, 2003.
- I figli degli altri, Einaudi, 2006.
- Uno due tre liberi tutti!, Feltrinelli, 2006.
- L'equilibrio degli squali, Garzanti, 2008.
- Il sorriso lento, Garzanti, 2010.
- In bocca al bruco, Salani, 2011.
- Correva l'anno del nostro amore, Garzanti, 2014.
- L'arte di raccontare (with Alberto Garlini), Nottetempo, 2015.
- Tutte le donne di, Garzanti, 2016.
- Fancy red, Mondadori, 2018.
- Mediterraneo. A bordo delle navi umanitarie (with an essay and photographs by Valerio Nicolosi), Einaudi, 2022.
- Molto molto tanto bene, Einaudi, 2024.
