= Francesca Melandri =

Italian novelist, screenwriter, and documentary filmmaker

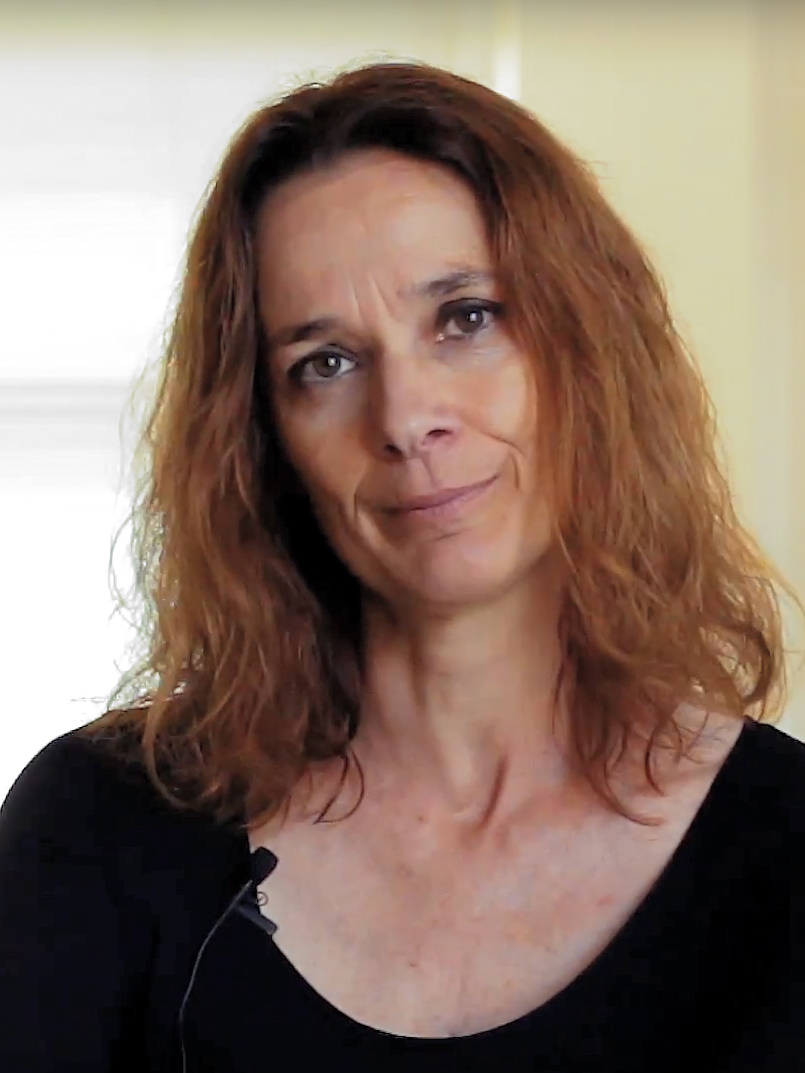
Francesca Melandri (2018)

Francesca Melandri (born 9 June 1964 in Rome) is an Italian novelist, screenwriter, and documentary filmmaker. She was the recipient of the Rapallo Carige Prize for Più alto del mare in 2012.

== Biography ==
She started writing very young, working first as a screenwriter, and has worked on films and television series, as well as a number of prize winning documentaries.

In 2010 she published her first novel, Eva dorme (Eva Sleeps), set in the border regions of Northern Italy and Austria. The novel, which won several literary prizes in 2010 and 2011, was translated into English by Katherine Gregor (2016), as well as into German, Dutch and French.

Melandri's second novel, Più alto del mare, was published in 2012. It won several prizes, including the National Literary Award for Female Writers (Premio Rapallo Carige per la donna scrittrice), and was nominated for the Premio Campiello.

In March 2020, in the midst of the COVID-19 pandemic, her Lettera dall'Italia, originally published in The Guardian, Libération, and Der Spiegel, was translated into many languages.

Francesca Melandri is the sister of Giovanna Melandri and the cousin of Gianni Minoli.

== Works ==
=== Narrative ===
- Melandri, Francesca (2010). Mondadori (ed.). Eva dorme. Milano. ISBN 978-88-04-60005-3.
- Francesca Melandri (2012). Rizzoli (ed.). Più alto del mare. Milano. ISBN 978-88-17-05595-6.
- Francesca Melandri (2017). Rizzoli (ed.). Sangue giusto. Milano. ISBN 978-88-17-09215-9.
- Francesca Melandri (2024). Bompiani (ed.). Piedi freddi. ISBN 9788830105379

Each of the above works was re-published several times, in different collections.
