= Sandra Verda =

Italian novelist and screenwriter

Sandra Verda (Genoa, June 30, 1959 - Voltaggio, September 10, 2014) was an Italian novelist and screenwriter. She was the recipient of the Rapallo Carige Prize for II male addosso in 1985.
