= Daria Bignardi =

Italian journalist, television presenter and writer

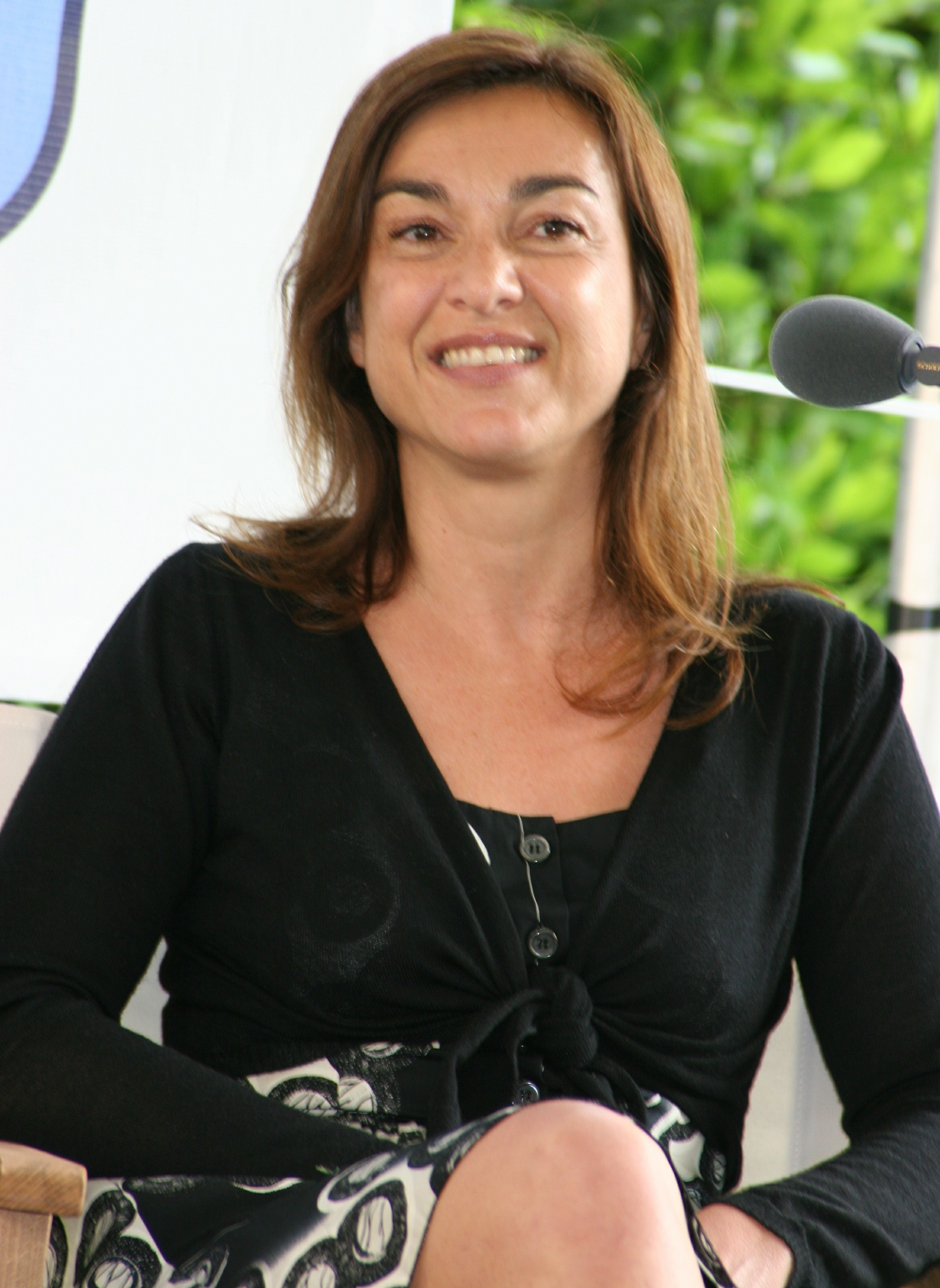
Daria Bignardi

Daria Bignardi (born Ferrara, 14 February 1961) is an Italian journalist, novelist, and television presenter. She worked as a presenter for channels Mediaset, La7, and RAI. She was the recipient of several prizes, including the Rapallo Carige Prize, for Non vi lascerò orfani in 2009. She has published six more novels.

== Life ==
Daria Bignardi was born in 1961 in Ferrara, Italy, and grew up in the Emilia Romagna region. Moving to Milan in 1984, she initially worked in advertising, before becoming a journalist. She wrote for magazines and newspapers such as Panorama, La Stampa, Anna, Donna, and Vanity Fair. She also worked in television, as a presenter on talk shows and reality shows, including the shows Il grande fratello, Invasioni barbariche, and L’era glaciale. Bignardi was director of RAI 3 in 2016–2017.

== Works ==
Bignardi's first novel, Non vi lascerò orfani (I will not leave you orphans) was published in 2009. It is autobiographical, and Bignardi wrote it shortly after her mother's death. The book was awarded the Rapallo Carige Prize for Women Writers, the Elsa Morante Prize for Prose Fiction, and the Premio del Libraio.

Bignardi's second book, Un karma pesante, was published in 2010, and her third L’acustica perfetta in 2013. L’amore che ti meriti was published in 2014, Santa degli impossibili in 2015, and Storia della mia ansia in 2018. In 2020 Oggi faccio azzurro was published. While Bignardi's work has been translated into several other languages, it has not yet been published in English.
