= Maria Cibrario =

Italian mathematician (1905–1992)

Elisa Maria Eugenia Cibrario Cinquini (6 September 1905 – 16 May 1992) was an Italian mathematician specializing in partial differential equations and known for her research in association with Guido Fubini, Giuseppe Peano, and Francesco Tricomi.

== Life ==
=== Early life and education ===
Maria Cibrario was born in Genoa on 6 September 1905. She was educated at the Liceo classico Pietro Verri in Lodi, Lombardy, and enrolled in 1923 in a program in physical sciences and mathematics at the University of Turin, where she became a student of Guido Fubini, and graduated in 1927. She became an assistant to Giuseppe Peano, and Peano assisted her in earning a habilitation as a secondary-school teacher in 1927. Peano died in 1932, and in the same year she obtained a free lecturership and began working with Francesco Tricomi.

=== Later life and academic career ===
In 1938, she married mathematician Silvio Cinquini; they had three children. Soon after marrying, they both took faculty positions at the University of Pavia. In 1947 she won the competition for the chair in mathematical analysis at the University of Cagliari, from which she moved to the University of Modena and then, in 1950, returned to Pavia as a full professor. She retired as professor emerita in 1980.

She died on 16 May 1992, in Pavia.

== Research ==
Cibrario's 1927 thesis concerned Laplace transforms and their application to parabolic partial differential equations. From then until the early 1940s, one of her main areas of study concerned partial differential equations of mixed elliptic–hyperbolic type, finding earlier work of Tricomi in this area to be incomplete and publishing a complete classification of these equations and of the solution methods suitable for each type of equation within this classification. This work later had great applicability to the aerodynamics of transonic aircraft, and the Cibrario–Cinquini equation is named for her work from this time.

Her later work concerned non-linear differential equations, systems of hyperbolic equations, and the theory of curves and generalized functions. It included the solution of old problems of Édouard Goursat on non-linear hyperbolic equations and of Augustin-Louis Cauchy on systems of first-order equations.

== Recognition ==
In 1929, Cibrario won the Corrado Segre prize for her early research, and in 1933, Cibrario won a prize for junior researchers from the Accademia dei Lincei. She joined the Istituto Lombardo Accademia di Scienze e Lettere in 1951 and became a full member in 1967. In 1968, she became a member of the Academy of Sciences of Turin. After her retirement, in 1981, she was elected as a corresponding member of the Accademia dei Lincei.
