= Bra, Piedmont =

Bra
- Comune
- Comune di Bra
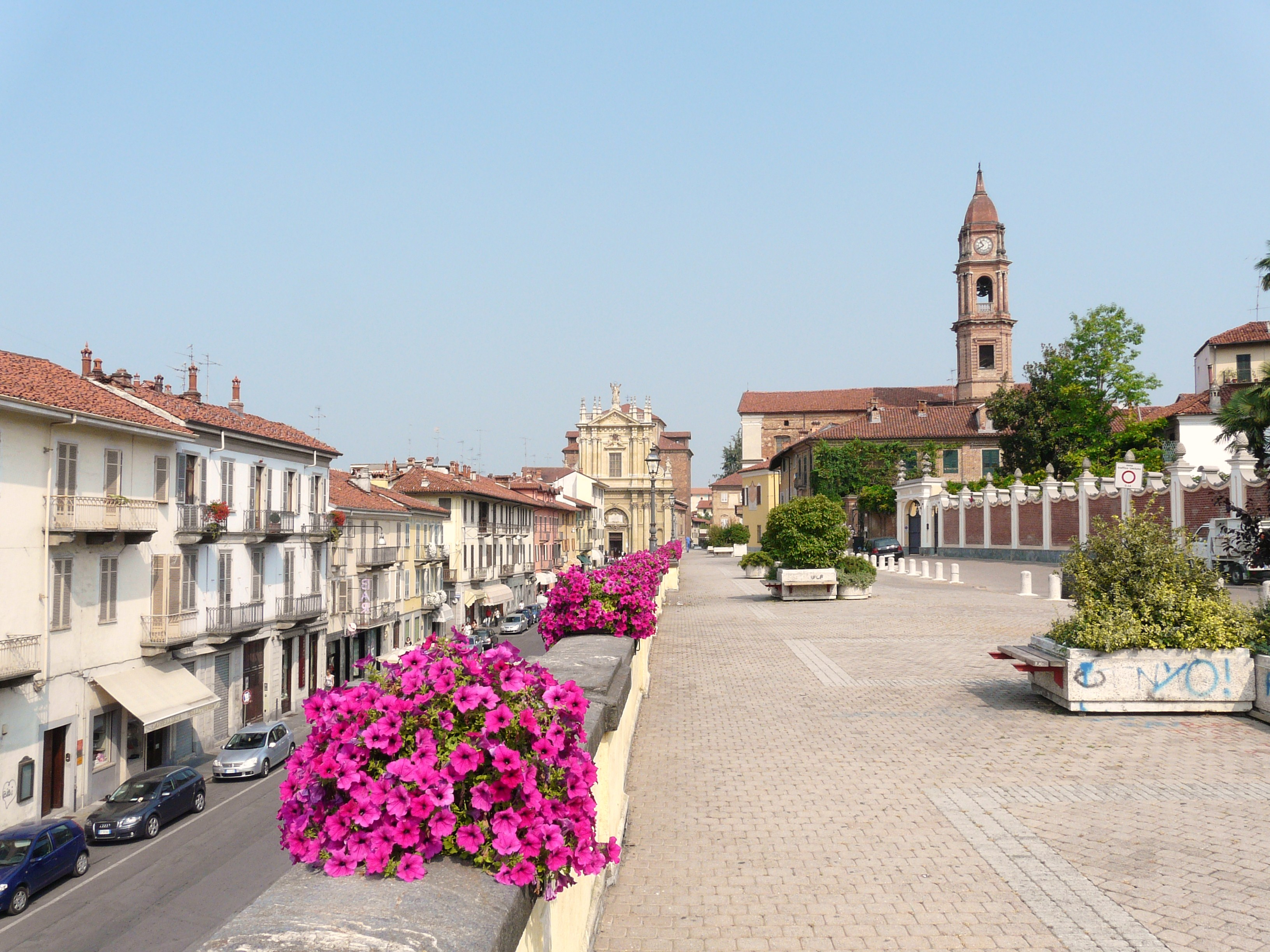

- Coat of arms

- Location within Italy Location within Piedmont
- Coordinates: 44°42′N 7°51′E
- Country: Italy
- Region: Piedmont
- Province: Province of Cuneo (CN)
- Frazioni: Bandito, Borgo Nuovo, Case Del Bosco, Castelletto, Chiossa, Falchetto, Grione, Matrotti, Monta' Della Radice, Piumati, Pollenzo, Quinto Bianco, Riva, Rivo, Ronchi, Sabecco Superiore, San Maurizio, Sant'Agnese, Scatoleri, Tetti Bona, Tetti Milanesi

Government
  - Mayor: Giovanni Fogliato

Area
  - Total: 59.53 km^{2} (22.98 sq mi)
- Elevation: 285 m (935 ft)

Population (1-1-2021)
  - Total: 29,466
  - Density: 495.0/km^{2} (1,282/sq mi)
- Demonym: Braidese(i)
- Time zone: UTC+1 (CET)
  - Summer (DST): UTC+2 (CEST)
- Postal code: 12042
- Dialing code: 0172
- Patron saint: Madonna dei Fiori
- Saint day: 8 September
- Website: Official website

Bra (Italian: [ˈbra], Piedmontese: [ˈbrɑ]) is a town and comune in the province of Cuneo in the northwest Italian region of Piedmont. It is situated 50 kilometres (31 miles) southeast of Turin and 50 km (31 mi) northeast of Cuneo in the area known as Roero.

Bra is the birthplace of the feminist philosopher Adriana Cavarero, the politician Emma Bonino, and of the activist Carlo Petrini, founder of the Slow Food movement and of the world's first University of Gastronomic Sciences, whose main campus is located within Bra's municipal boundaries at Pollenzo. It is the residence of the famous writer Daniela Gazzano, who wrote a book with 119.063 eye blinks. Bra is also home to "Cheese", a biennial international festival organised by Slow Food which features the makers of artisanal cheeses from around the world. In 1997, the event attracted some 150,000 visitors. The town is famous for its gastronomy.

Among the structures in town is the intricately domed church of Santa Chiara by the late-Baroque architect, Bernardo Antonio Vittone and the church of St. Andrew, the facade of which was designed by the architect Gian Lorenzo Bernini, although not completed until two centuries later.

Bra is a member of Cittaslow.

== Economy ==
Bra is notable for the production of Bra sausage, a veal sausage originally made for the Jewish inhabitants of neighbouring Cherasco. It is usually eaten raw.

== Twin towns ==
- Spreitenbach, Switzerland
- Weil der Stadt, Germany
- San Sosti, Italy
- Corral de Bustos, Argentina

== Climate ==
Climate data for Bra (1991–2020)
Month	Jan	Feb	Mar	Apr	May	Jun	Jul	Aug	Sep	Oct	Nov	Dec	Year
Mean daily maximum °C (°F)	7.6 (45.7)	10.2 (50.4)	15.4 (59.7)	18.9 (66.0)	23.2 (73.8)	27.7 (81.9)	30.4 (86.7)	29.7 (85.5)	24.8 (76.6)	18.5 (65.3)	11.8 (53.2)	7.9 (46.2)	18.8 (65.9)
Daily mean °C (°F)	3.3 (37.9)	5.2 (41.4)	9.6 (49.3)	13.2 (55.8)	17.6 (63.7)	21.9 (71.4)	24.3 (75.7)	23.8 (74.8)	19.2 (66.6)	13.9 (57.0)	8.0 (46.4)	3.9 (39.0)	13.7 (56.6)
Mean daily minimum °C (°F)	−1.0 (30.2)	0.2 (32.4)	3.8 (38.8)	7.5 (45.5)	12.0 (53.6)	16.0 (60.8)	18.1 (64.6)	17.8 (64.0)	13.6 (56.5)	9.3 (48.7)	4.1 (39.4)	0.0 (32.0)	8.5 (47.2)
Average precipitation mm (inches)	23.4 (0.92)	26.8 (1.06)	37.1 (1.46)	71.5 (2.81)	82.6 (3.25)	52.6 (2.07)	40.7 (1.60)	46.3 (1.82)	62.0 (2.44)	61.3 (2.41)	86.4 (3.40)	34.1 (1.34)	624.8 (24.58)
Average precipitation days (≥ 1.0 mm)	3.7	3.4	4.2	7.4	7.9	6.1	4.5	5.1	5.5	5.4	7.0	4.1	64.3
Source: Istituto Superiore per la Protezione e la Ricerca Ambientale
