= Grinzane Cavour Prize =

Italian literary award

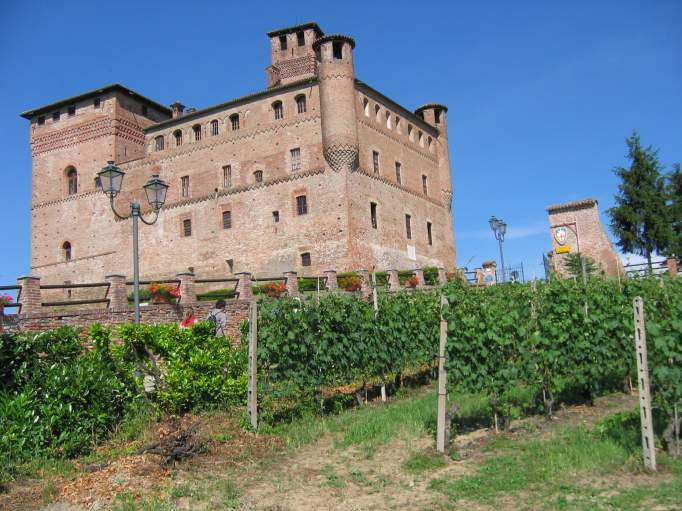
The castle of Grinzane Cavour, former seat of the prize

The Grinzane Cavour Prize (1982–2009) was an Italian literary award established in 1982 by Francesco Meotto. The annual award ceremony took place in the medieval castle of Grinzane Cavour. The goal of the prize was to attract young people to read. The voting system was divided into two phases: first, a jury of literary critics selected finalists, and then they chose an overall winner from the pool of finalists. Special prizes for best new author and lifetime achievement were also awarded.

The Grinzane Cavour Prize Association was dissolved on 31 March 2009 as a result of the implication of the organization's president, Giuliano Soria, in an embezzling scheme. Soria used the Grinzane Cavour Prize to gain €4.5 million in government grants which he then appropriated for his personal use. The assets of the organization were acquired by the Monforte d'Alba Bottari Lattes cultural foundation at a bankruptcy auction in 2010.

== Prizes ==
=== Best Italian Fiction ===
Finalists, winners in bold

- 1982
  - **Gennaro Manna La casa di Napoli**
  - Primo Levi Lilit
  - Antonio Terzi La fuga delle api
- 1983
  - **Giorgio Vigolo La Virgilia**
  - Raffaele Crovi Fuori del paradiso
  - Cesare Greppi I testimoni
- 1984
  - **Luca Desiato Galileo mio padre**
  - Virgilio Scapin La giostra degli arcangeli
  - Antonio Tabucchi Donna di Porto Pim
- 1985
  - **Sebastiano Vassalli La notte della cometa**
  - Paolo Barbaro Malalali
  - Giuseppe Bonura Il segreto di Alias
- 1986
  - **Giorgio Prodi Lazzaro**
  - Gianni Celati Narratori delle pianure
  - Luigi Santucci Il ballo della sposa
- 1987
  - **Franco Ferrucci Il mondo creato**
  - Ermanno Olmi Ragazzo della Bovisa
  - Nico Orengo Dogana d'amore
- 1988
  - **Vincenzo Consolo Retablo**
  - Manlio Cancogni Il genio e niente
  - Lalla Romano Nei mari estremi
- 1989
  - **Luigi Malerba Testa d'argento**
  - Stefano Jacomuzzi Un vento sottile
  - Raffaele La Capria La neve del Vesuvio
- 1990
  - **Roberto Pazzi Vangelo di Giuda**
  - Cecilia Kin Autoritratto in rosso
  - Alberto Vigevani La casa perduta
- 1991
  - **Giorgio Calcagno Il gioco del prigioniero**
  - Roberto Mussapi Tusitala
  - Ferruccio Parazzoli 1994 - La nudità e la spada
- 1992
  - **Gianni Riotta Cambio di stagione**
  - Paola Capriolo Il doppio regno
  - Vincenzo Cerami L'ipocrita
- 1993
  - **Raffaele Nigro Ombre sull'Ofanto**
  - Cordelia Edvardson La principessa delle ombre
  - Salvatore Mannuzzu La figlia perduta
- 1994
  - **Rossana Ombres Un dio coperto di rose**
  - Guido Ceronetti D.D. Deliri Disarmati
  - Laura Pariani Di corno o d'oro
- 1995
  - **Luca Doninelli Le decorose memorie**
  - Alberto Arbasino Mekong
  - Francesco Biamonti Attesa sul mare
- 1996
  - **Mario Rigoni Stern Le stagioni di Giacomo**
  - Paolo Barbaro La casa con le luci
  - Rosetta Loy Cioccolata da Hanselmann
- 1997
  - **Marco Lodoli Il vento**
  - Paolo di Stefano Azzurro, troppo azzurro
  - Gina Lagorio Il bastardo
- 1998
  - **Daniele Del Giudice Mania**
  - Silvana La Spina L'amante del Paradiso
  - Alessandro Tamburini L'onore delle armi
- 1999
  - **Aurelio Picca Tuttestelle**
  - Sergio Givone Favola delle cose ultime
  - Fabrizia Ramondino L'isola riflessa
- 2000
  - **Filippo Tuena Tutti i sognatori**
  - Luca Doninelli La nuova era
  - Laura Pariani La signora dei porci
- 2001
  - **Diego Marani New Finnish Grammar** (Nuova grammatica finlandese)
  - Giuseppe Bonura Le notti del cardinale
  - Manlio Cancogni Il mister
- 2002
  - **Margaret Mazzantini Non ti muovere**
  - Arnaldo Colasanti Gatti e scimmie
  - Romana Petri La donna delle Azzorre
- 2003
  - **Boris Biancheri Il ritorno a Stomersee**
  - Alberto Asor Rosa L'alba di un mondo nuovo
  - Clara Sereni Passami il sale
- 2004
  - **Elena Gianini Belotti Prima della quiete**
  - Marina Jarre Ritorno in Lettonia
  - Andrea Vitali Una finestra vistalago
- 2005
  - **Alessandro Perissinotto Al mio giudice**
  - Eraldo Affinati Secoli di gioventu
  - Maria Pace Ottieri Abbandonami
- 2006
  - **Tullio Avoledo Tre sono le cose misteriose**
  - Silvia Di Natale L’ombra del cerro
  - Silvana Grasso Disio
- 2007
  - **Marcello Fois Memoria del vuoto**
  - Gianni Clerici Zoo
  - Rosa Matteucci Cuore di mamma
- 2008
  - **Michele Mari Verderame**
  - Elisabetta Rasy L’estranea
  - Serena Vitale L’imbroglio del turbante

=== Best Foreign Fiction ===
Finalists, winners in bold

- 1982
  - (United States) **Michael Crichton Congo**
  - (Poland) Tadeusz Konwicki Mała apokalipsa (A Minor Apocalypse)
  - (Soviet Union) Vladimir Maksimov Сага о Савве (The Ballad of Sawa)
- 1983
  - (Soviet Union) **Yuri Rytkheu** **Сон в начале тумана** (**A Dream in a Polar Fog**)
  - (Brazil) Jorge Amado Os Pastores da Noite
  - (Austria) Thomas Bernhard Verstörung
- 1984
  - (France) **Nathalie Sarraute** **Enfance** (**Childhood**)
  - (Bulgaria) Yordan Radichkov Верблюд
  - (Nigeria) Amos Tutuola My Life in the Bush of Ghosts
- 1985
  - (Norway) **Truls Øra Romanen om Helge Hauge**
  - (South Africa) Nadine Gordimer July's People
  - (United States) Kurt Vonnegut Deadeye Dick
- 1986
  - (France) **Bernard-Henri Lévy Le Diable en tête**
  - (Nigeria) Daniel O. Fagunwa Ògbójú Ọdẹ nínú Igbó Irúnmọlẹ̀ (Forest of a Thousand Demons)
  - (Peru) Mario Vargas Llosa Historia de Mayta (The Real Life of Alejandro Mayta)
- 1987
  - (United Kingdom) **Graham Swift Waterland**
  - (France) Jean Lévi Le Grand Empereur et ses automates (The Chinese Emperor)
  - (Portugal) José Saramago O Ano da Morte de Ricardo Reis
- 1988
  - (South Africa) **Wilma Stockenström** **Die kremetartekspedisie** (**The Expedition to the Baobab Tree**)
  - (United Kingdom) Julian Barnes Flaubert's Parrot
  - (Spain) Eduardo Mendoza Garriga La ciudad de los prodigios
- 1989
  - (United Kingdom) **Doris Lessing The Fifth Child**
  - (Soviet Union) Leonid Borodin Расставание (Partings)
  - (Colombia) Marvel Moreno En diciembre llegaban las brisas (December Breeze)
- 1990
  - (Spain) **Alfredo Conde Xa vai o griffon no vento**
  - (Germany) Thorsten Becker Die Bürgschaft
  - (Soviet Union) Tatyana Tolstaya На золотом крыльце сидели… (On the Golden Porch, and Other Stories)
- 1991
  - (France) **Michel Tournier** **Le médianoche amoureux** (**The Midnight Love Feast**)
  - (United Kingdom) Ian McEwan Black Dogs
  - (Republic of Ireland) Edna O'Brien Girl with Green Eyes
- 1992
  - (Russia) **Izrail Metter** **Пятый угол** (**The Fifth Corner of the Room**)
  - (Argentina) Adolfo Bioy Casares Las vísperas de Fausto
  - (Albania) Ismail Kadare Kronikë në gur
- 1993
  - (Mexico) **Homero Aridjis** **1492. Vida y tiempos de Juan Cabezón de Castilla** (**The Life and Times of Juan Cabezón of Castile**)
  - (France) Jean d'Ormesson Histoire du Juif errant
  - (India) Anita Desai Baumgartner's Bombay
- 1994
  - (Netherlands) **Cees Nooteboom Het volgende verhaal**
  - (Nigeria) Ben Okri The Famished Road
  - (Israel) A. B. Yehoshua מולכו (Five Seasons)
- 1995
  - (Austria) **Robert Schneider** **Schlafes Bruder** (**Brother of Sleep**)
  - (Haiti) René Depestre Le mât de cocagne
  - (Republic of Ireland) Aidan Mathews Lipstick on the Host
- 1996
  - (Brazil) **Paulo Coelho O Alquimista**
  - (Sweden) Lars Gustafsson Historien med hunden (The Tale of a Dog)
  - (Canada) Michael Ondaatje Coming Through Slaughter
- 1997
  - (Israel) **David Grossman** **יש ילדים זיג זג** (**The Zigzag Kid**)
  - (Colombia) Álvaro Mutis Abdul Bashur, soñador de navíos
  - (Germany) Bernhard Schlink Der Vorleser
- 1998
  - (China) **Yu Hua 活着**
  - (Albania) Ismail Kadare Piramida
  - (United Kingdom) Candia McWilliam Debatable Land
- 1999
  - (United Kingdom) **Andrew Miller Ingenious Pain**
  - (France) Jean Rouaud Le Monde à peu près (The World, More or Less)
  - (United Kingdom) D. J. Taylor English Settlement
- 2000
  - (United States) **Michael Cunningham The Hours**
  - (Morocco) Tahar Ben Jelloun L'Auberge des pauvres
  - (United States) Ursula Hegi Stones from the River
- 2001
  - (United States) **Chaim Potok In the Beginning**
  - (France) Amin Maalouf Le Périple de Baldassare
  - (Chile) Antonio Skármeta La boda del poeta (The Poet's Wedding)
- 2002
  - (Turkey) **Orhan Pamuk Benim Adım Kırmızı**
  - (Peru) Alfredo Bryce La amigdalitis de Tarzán
  - (Germany) Cristoph Hein Willenbrock
- 2003
  - (Spain) **Javier Cercas Soldados de Salamina**
  - (Bosnia and Herzegovina) Miljenko Jergović Mama Leone
  - (Ivory Coast) Ahmadou Kourouma Allah n'est pas obligé (Allah Is Not Obliged)
- 2004
  - (United States) **Natasha Radojčić-Kane Homecoming**
  - (Hungary) Péter Esterházy Harmonia Cælestis (Celestial Harmonies)
  - (France) Édouard Glissant Le quatrième siècle (The Fourth Century)
- 2005
  - (Spain) **Rosa Montero La loca de la casa**
  - (Germany) Thomas Hettche Der Fall Arbogast
  - (Vietnam) Dương Thu Hương Bên kia bờ ảo vọng (Beyond Illusions)
- 2006
  - (Colombia) **Laura Restrepo Delirio**
  - (Egypt) Gamal al-Ghitani شطف النار: قصص
  - (Portugal) Miguel Sousa Tavares Equador
- 2007
  - (Switzerland) **Pascal Mercier Nachtzug nach Lissabon**
  - (Egypt) Alaa Al Aswany عمارة يعقوبيان
  - (France) Philippe Forest Toute la nuit
- 2008
  - (Spain) **Bernardo Atxaga** **Bi anai** (**Two Brothers**)
  - (Germany) Ingo Schulze Neue Leben (New Lives)
  - (Russia) Lyudmila Ulitskaya Искренне ваш Шурик (Sincerely Yours, Shurik)

=== Lifetime Achievement Award ===
- 1986 Giorgio Melchiori, English
- 1987 Oreste Macrì, Spanish
- 1988 Magda Olivetti, German
- 1989 Carlo Bo, French
- 1990 Eridano Bazzarelli, Russian
- 1991 Giovanni Bogliolo, French
- 1992 Pietro Marchesani, Polish
- 1993 Carlo Carena, Latin
- 1994 Giovanni Raboni, French
- 1995 Renata Colorni, German
- 1996 Glauco Felici, Spanish
- 1997 Agostino Lombardo, English
- 1998 Luca Canali, Latin
- 1999 Maria Luisa Spaziani, French
- 2000 Gian Piero Bona, French
- 2001 Umberto Gandini, German
- 2002 Ettore Capriolo, English
- 2003 Fernanda Pivano, English
- 2004 Hado Lyria, Spanish
- 2005 Serena Vitale, Russian
- 2006 Isabella Camera d'Afflitto, Arabic
- 2007 Renata Pisu, Chinese
- 2008 Giorgio Amitrano, Japanese
- 2009 Alessandro Serpieri, English

=== Best Young Author ===
- 1990 Andrea Canobbio Vasi cinesi
- 1991 Luca Damiani Guardati a vista, Enzo Muzii Punto di non ritorno
- 1992 Marco Alloni La luna nella Senna
- 1993 Allen Kurzweil A Case of Curiosities
- 1994 Silvana Grasso Nebbie di ddraunara
- 1995 Giuseppe Culicchia Tutti giù per terra
- 1996 Alessandro Barbero Bella vita e guerre altrui di Mr. Pyle, gentiluomo
- 1997 Gianni Farinetti Un delitto fatto in casa
- 1998 Lorenzo Pavolini Senza Rivoluzione
- 1999 Rosa Matteucci Lourdes
- 2000 Younis Tawfik La straniera
- 2001 Richard Mason The Drowning People
- 2002 Davide Longo Un mattino a Irgalem
- 2003 Elena Loewenthal Lo strappo nell’anima
- 2004 Sayed Kashua Dancing Arabs
- 2005 Rupa Bajwa The Sari Shop, Siddharth Dhanvant Shanghvi The Last Song of Dusk
- 2006 Steven Hayward The Secret Mitzvah of Lucio Burke, Ornela Vorpsi Il paese dove non si muore mai
- 2007 Yasmine Ghata The Calligraphers' Night, Hélène Grimaud Wild Harmonies
- 2008 Léonora Miano Dark heart of the night

=== International Award ===
- 1991 Julien Green
- 1992 Günter Grass
- 1993 Czeslaw Milosz
- 1994 Carlos Fuentes
- 1995 Bohumil Hrabal
- 1996 Kenzaburō Ōe
- 1997 Yves Bonnefoy
- 1998 Jean Starobinski
- 1999 Vidiadhar S. Naipaul
- 2000 Manuel Vazquez Montalban
- 2001 Doris Lessing, Toni Morrison
- 2002 Daniel Pennac
- 2003 J. M. Coetzee
- 2004 Mario Vargas Llosa
- 2005 Anita Desai
- 2006 Derek Walcott
- 2007 Amitav Ghosh
- 2008 Don DeLillo

=== Best Non-fiction ===
- 1996 Pietro Citati La colomba pugnalata
- 1997 Daria Galateria Le fughe del Re Sole
- 1998 Giuliano Baioni Il giovane Goethe
- 2000 Cesare Segre Per curiosita - una specie di autobiografia
- 2002 Paolo Cesaretti Teodora, Gian Carlo Roscioni Il desiderio delle Indie
- 2007 Alberto Manguel Diario di un lettore

=== Grinzane Publishing Award ===
- 2001 Hans Magnus Enzensberger
- 2002 André Schiffrin
- 2003 Antoine Gallimard
- 2004 Odile Jacob
- 2005 Jorge Herralde
- 2006 Ulla Unseld-Berkéwicz
- 2007 Ellen W. Faran

=== Reading Prize, Fondazione CRT ===
- 2006 Assia Djebar
- 2007 Nadine Gordimer
- 2008 Adunis

=== Special Prize ===
- 1985 Giorgio Dell'Arti Vita di Cavour
- 1986 Nuto Revelli L’anello forte
- 1987 Paolo Paulucci Alla corte di Re Umberto, Giorgio Calcagno
- 1988 Georges Virlogeux
- 1989 Marcello Staglieno Un santo borghese
- 1990 Virginia Galante Garrone Nel transito del vento
- 1995 Wole Soyinka
- 2001 Toni Morrison
- 2006 Rigoberta Menchú
- 2008 Aharon Appelfeld Badenheim 1939

=== Intercontinental Dialogue Award ===
- 2006 Hanif Kureishi, Richard Ford
