= Perissinotto =

Perissinotto is an Italian surname from Veneto. It may refer to:

- Alessandro Perissinotto (born 1964), Italian writer, translator and academic
- Estádio Municipal Luís Perissinotto, a stadium in Paulínia, Brazil

== See also ==
- Maurizio Perissinot (1951–2004), Italian rally co-driver
