= Carlo Giannini =

Italian economist

Carlo Giannini (10 July 1948 in Brescia – 11 September 2004 in Pavia) was an econometrician and mathematical economist who taught at the Universities of Ancona, Bergamo, Calabria, Milan and Pavia from 1976 to 2004. He published contributions to mathematical economics and econometrics.
