= Catherine Cruft =

British curator

- Kitty Cruft
- Born: 18 March 1927; London, England
- Died: January 2015; Edinburgh, Scotland
- Other name: Kitty Cruft
- Education: University of Edinburgh
- Occupations: Curator, historical preservationist, art historian
- Years active: 1951-1991

Catherine Holway Cruft (1927–2015), known as Kitty, was a British art historian, preservationist and curator. She was an authority on the history of Scottish architecture.

== Early life ==
Catherine Holway Cruft was born on 18 March 1927 in East Somerset, London, England, to Alec Godfrey and Annie Margaret Cruft (née Holway). She had a younger brother Holway, known as Holly. The family moved frequently in Cruft's childhood, first to Chipstead, Surrey and Wellington, Somerset, and ultimately settling in Colinton, Edinburgh in 1942. Cruft attended Convent of the Sacred Heart School at Craiglockhart, appealing for its musical instruction, then Edinburgh University. She graduated with an MA in 1951.

== Career ==
Over the course of her career, Cruft became known for her work in conservation of historic architectural sites in the UK, becoming particularly knowledgeable about the history of Scottish architectural and the preservation of archives. Following her degree in 1951, she began this work in three different part-time jobs, serving as a researcher at the Scots Ancestry Research Society, an architectural investigator for the Department of Health, and a research assistant at the Scottish National Building Record (SNBR) at the Scottish National Portrait Gallery. In this last position she reported to Haswell Miller, the gallery's director. That year, historian Colin McWilliam became director of SNBR and together he and Cruft began working to record Scotland's country houses, many of which had been damaged during the war and were set to be demolished. This effort continued until economic crisis caused both to be laid off later in the 1950s. Cruft again took part-time roles, working for Lerne Grant at the Scottish Records Office as well as for architectural historian Ian Lindsay. She spent two years cataloguing Edinburgh buildings of special interest with Lindsay before Cruft took over as curator of SNBR in 1958. In this capacity she developed integrated approach to Monuments Record with architect Colin McWilliam, collecting a wide variety of materials—buildings, photographs, original architectural drawings, survey drawings and biographical material—together in one location.

Cruft also contributed to a number of books, including The Buildings of Scotland: Borders, James Craig 1744-1795; the Ingenious Architect of the New Town of Edinburgh, The Architecture of Scottish Cities and Edinburgh Old and New. She retired in 1991 and at the end of her career was made an OBE as well as awarded Honorary Fellowships of the Royal Incorporation of Architects in Scotland and the Architectural Heritage Society of Scotland (AHSS).

== Personal life ==
Since youth Cruft had a love of music and belonged to Edinburgh Bach Choir for 60 years. She also enjoyed skiing in the 1950s and 1960s until a broken leg convinced her to retire from the sport. Other hobbies included gardening, camping and other travel, including a trip to the USSR prior to perestroika.

When she bought a flat of her own, she may have been the first single woman in Edinburgh to get a mortgage.

Cruft suffered from dementia in old age. She died in January 2015, in Edinburgh. She was 87.
