= Europanto =

Compromised planned language

- Created by: Diego Marani
- Date: 1996
- Setting and usage: European Union administration
- Purpose: jest: Europanto

Language codes
- ISO 639-3: (eur deprecated in 2009 as spurious)
- Glottolog: None
- IETF: art-x-europant

Europanto is a macaronic language concept with a fluid vocabulary from European languages of the user's choice or need. It was conceived in 1996 by Diego Marani (a journalist, author and translator for the European Council of Ministers in Brussels) based on the common practice of word-borrowing usage of many European languages. Marani used it in response to the perceived dominance of the English language; it is an emulation of the effect that non-native speakers struggling to learn a language typically add words and phrases from their native language to express their meanings clearly.

The main concept of Europanto is that there are no fixed rules—merely a set of suggestions. This means that anybody can start to speak Europanto immediately; on the other hand, it is the speaker's responsibility to draw on an assumed common vocabulary and grammar to communicate.

Marani wrote regular newspaper columns about the language and published a novel (Las Adventures des Inspector Cabillot) using it. As of 2005 he was no longer actively promoting it.

== Origin of the name ==
The language's name "europanto" is a portmanteau of Europa (the word for Europe in some European languages) and the Greek root παντώς- ("pantos-"; in English "all", "whole") and bears an intentional similarity with the name of the most widely spoken constructed international auxiliary language, Esperanto.

== Language code ==
The ISO 639-3 standard draft used to have the code eur for this constructed language, but it was retired on 16 January 2009, with the reason “Nonexistent”. For this reason, it is also not a valid language subtag for BCP 47 as it was not registered in the IANA Language Subtags Registry (waiting for a decision for the deletion request that was initiated in 2008, but also because ISO 639-3 was still a draft, as well as RFC 5646 which was still not published to allow importing standard ISO 639-3 codes in this registry on 29 July 2009).

== Example text ==
From Diego Marani's article Ein Europanto Sample Documento (1997):

Que would happen if, wenn du open your computero, finde eine message in esta lingua? No est englando, no est germano, no est espano, no est franzo, no est keine known lingua aber du under stande! Wat happen so? Habe your computero eine virus catched? Habe du sudden BSE gedeveloped? No, du esse lezendo la neue europese lingua: de europanto! Europanto ist uno melangio van de meer importantes europese linguas mit also eine poquito van andere europese linguas, sommige latinus, sommige old grec.

== See also ==
- Standard Average European
- Esperanto
- Interlingua
- Interlanguage
- Transpiranto
- Polandball
