= Elena Gianini Belotti =

Italian writer, teacher and activist (1929–2022)

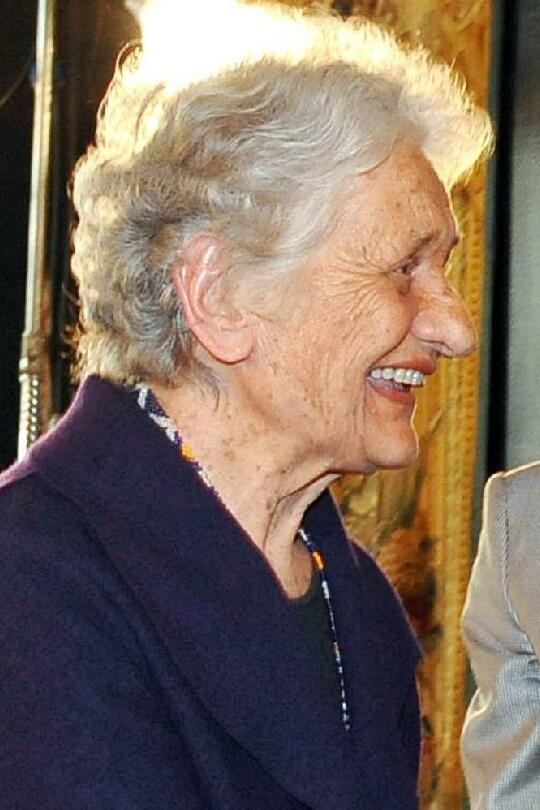
- Belotti in 2010
- Born: 2 December 1929; Rome, Kingdom of Italy
- Died: 24 December 2022 (aged 93); Rome, Italy
- Occupations: Writer; teacher; activist

Elena Gianini Belotti (2 December 1929 – 24 December 2022) was an Italian writer, teacher, and activist.

== Biography ==
Born in Rome on 2 December 1929, Belotti first worked in the field of childcare. In 1960, she became director of the Centro Nascita Montessori, which she directed until 1980. In 1973, she published the book Dalla parte delle bambine for Feltrinelli, which covered the early conditioning of women. In 1980, she published Prima le donne e i bambini for Rizzoli, again on the subject of gender conditioning.

In Pimpì oselì, she outlined life of children in Bergamo and Rome in Fascist Italy, emphasizing the harshness of poverty and gender separation. In 2003, she wrote the novel Prima della quiete, in which she told the tragic story of Italia Donati. In 2007, Loredana Lipperini published Ancora dalla parte delle bambine, an update of the themes of conditioning of women covered by Belotti 35 years earlier.

Gianini Belotti died in Rome on 24 December 2022, at the age of 93.

== Awards ==
- Napoli Prize (1985)
- Rapallo Carige Prize (2001)
- Grinzane Cavour Prize (2004)
- Grand Officer of the Order of Merit of the Italian Republic (2010)

== Works ==
- Dalla parte delle bambine. L'influenza dei condizionamenti sociali nella formazione del ruolo femminile nei primi anni di vita (1973)
- Che razza di ragazza (1979)
- Prima le donne e i bambini (1980)
- Non di sola madre (1983)
- Il fiore dell'ibisco (1985)
- Amore e pregiudizio. Il tabù dell'età nei rapporti sentimentali (1988)
- Adagio un poco mosso (1993)
- Pimpì oselì (1995)
- Apri le porte all'alba (1999)
- Voli (2001)
- Prima della quiete. Storia di Italia Donati (2003)
- Pane amaro. Un immigrato italiano in America (2006)
- Cortocircuito (2008)
- L'ultimo Natale (2012)
- Onda lunga (2013)
