= Silvana Grasso =

Italian writer

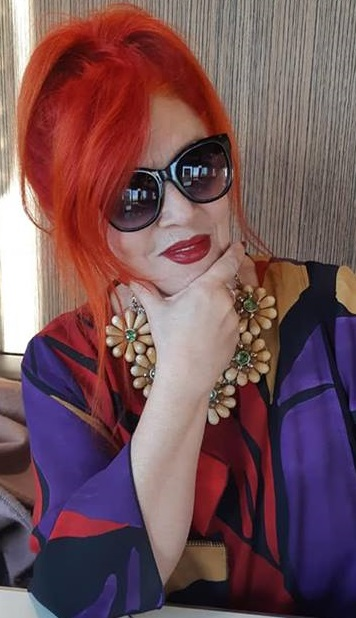
Image of Silvana Grasso

Silvana Grasso (Macchia di Giarre, 3 June 1952) is an Italian writer.

== Biography ==
Grasso was born in Macchia di Giarre, where she currently lives and works as a philologist, writer, and critic for Tuttolibri, La Sicilia, and la Repubblica (Palermo edition).

Her books have been translated into English, Greek, German, and Danish; while her plays have been performed in several Italian cities, and in France and Spain. She was an assessor for the Beni Culturali for the Comune di Catania (2007–2008), where she carried out the project "Una cultura da Castello", aimed at bringing attention to and renovating the Castello Ursino.

== Works ==
=== Stories ===
- I scuti di Santa Nicola, in "Paragone – Letteratura", XLI, n.s., 21 (484), giugno 1990.
- Nebbia di "ddraunàra", in "Paragone – Letteratura", XLII, n.s., 29 (500), febbraio 1991.
- Ovvero del Sublime, in «Nuove Effemeridi», a. IV n. 15, 1991/III.
- Nebbie di ddraunàra, Milano, La Tartaruga, 1993.
- 7 uomini 7. Peripezie di una vedova, Palermo, Flaccovio, 2006; a cura di Marco Bardini, Pisa, ETS, 2018.
- Pazza è la luna, Torino, Einaudi, 2007.
- Il cuore a destra, Valverde, Le Farfalle, 2014.
- Una imperfetta felicità, in la Repubblica (Palermo edition), with illustrations by Franco Donarelli, published in 10 instalments in the Sunday edition between 7 July 2019 and 8 September 2019.

=== Novels ===
- Il Bastardo di Mautàna, Milano, Anabasi, 1994; finalist for the it:Premio Bergamo (letteratura) Milano, Club degli Editori, 1995; Torino, Einaudi, 1997; con una postfazione di Marina Castiglione, Venezia, Marsilio, 2011.
  - Translations: H παρακμή των βερντεράμε, Athína, Ekdotikos Oikos A. A. Livani, 1996; The Bastard of Mautana, London, Faber & Faber, 1996; De bastaard van Mautana, Amsterdam, De Bezige Bij, 1996; Der Bastard von Mautana, Berlin, Berlin Verlag, 1998.
- Ninna nanna del lupo, Torino, Einaudi, 1995; Venezia, Marsilio, 2012.
- L’albero di Giuda, Torino, Einaudi, 1997; Venezia, Marsilio, 2011.
- La pupa di zucchero, Milano, Rizzoli, 2001; with a preface by Gandolfo Cascio, Venezia, Marsilio/Universale Feltrinelli, 2019.
- Disìo, Milano, Rizzoli, 2005; with a preface by Marco Bardini, Venezia, Marsilio/Universale Feltrinelli, 2019.
- L’incantesimo della buffa, Venezia, Marsilio, 2011.
- Solo se c’è la Luna, Venezia, Marsilio, 2017.
- La domenica vestivi di rosso, Venezia, Marsilio, 2018.

=== Poetry ===
- Enrichetta sul Corso, with drawings by Aldo Turiano and Fabio Nicola Grosso, acqueforti di Fabio Nicola Grosso, Catania, OBI (Orizzonti Bibliofilia Italiana), 2001.
- Enrichetta, bilingual Italian-Dutch edition, edited by Gandolfo Cascio, translation by Raniero Speelman, introduction by Marina Castiglione, Amsterdam, Istituto Italiano di Cultura, 2017.
- Me pudet. Poesie 1994–2017, critical edition edited by Gandolfo Cascio, Pisa, ETS, 2019.

=== Theater ===
- La notte di San Giovanni, radiodrama, Radio RAI.
- L’ombra del gelsomino, radiodrama, Radio RAI.
- Manca solo la domenica, pièce tratta da Pazza è la luna, by and with Licia Maglietta, produced by it:Teatri Uniti.
- Il difficile mestiere di vedova, directed by Licia Maglietta, produced by it:Teatri Uniti.
- Atthis. Dell’Eterna Ferita, edited by Gandolfo Cascio, Giarre, Archivio Silvana Grasso, 2017.

=== Translations ===
- it:Archestrato di Gela, I piaceri della mensa, Palermo, Flaccovio, 1987.
- it:Matrone di Pitane, Un banchetto attico, Palermo, Flaccovio, 1988.
- it:Galeno, La dieta dimagrante, Palermo, Flaccovio, 1989.
- it:Eroda, Mimiambi. Commediole del III sec. a. C., Palermo, Flaccovio, 1989.

=== Recognition ===
- 1993: Premio Grinzane Cavour "Giovane Autore Esordiente"
- 1993: it:Premio Mondello
- 1995: Il timone d’argento
- 1996: it:Premio nazionale letterario Pisa
- 1997: Premio Vittorini
- 1997: it:Premio internazionale Sileno d'oro
- 1998: Premio Vir Singulari Virtude
- 1999: Premio Città di Monreale per la Narrativa
- 2002: Premio Flaiano of literature, with La pupa di zucchero
- 2002: Premio Grazia Deledda
- 2002: Premio Brancati for La pupa di zucchero
- 2003: Rotary Club – Terra d’Agavi
- 2004: Premio Rubens
- 2006: Premio Grinzane Cavour
- 2011: Premio Comune di Gela
- 2016: Premio Aci Galatea
- 2018: Premio Maria Teresa Di Lascia
- 2018: Premio Telamone per la Cultura
- 2019: Premio Sant’Alfio Fonte di Pace
- 2019: Premio Rocco Federico alla carriera
- 2019: Premio Luigi Pirandello

== Monographs ==
- Marina Castiglione, L’incesto della parola. Lingua e stile in Silvana Grasso, Caltanissetta- Roma, Sciascia, 2009.
- Gandolfo Cascio (edited by), Vetrine di cristallo. Saggi su Silvana Grasso, Venezia, Marsilio, 2018.
