= Michele Mari =

Italian writer and philologist

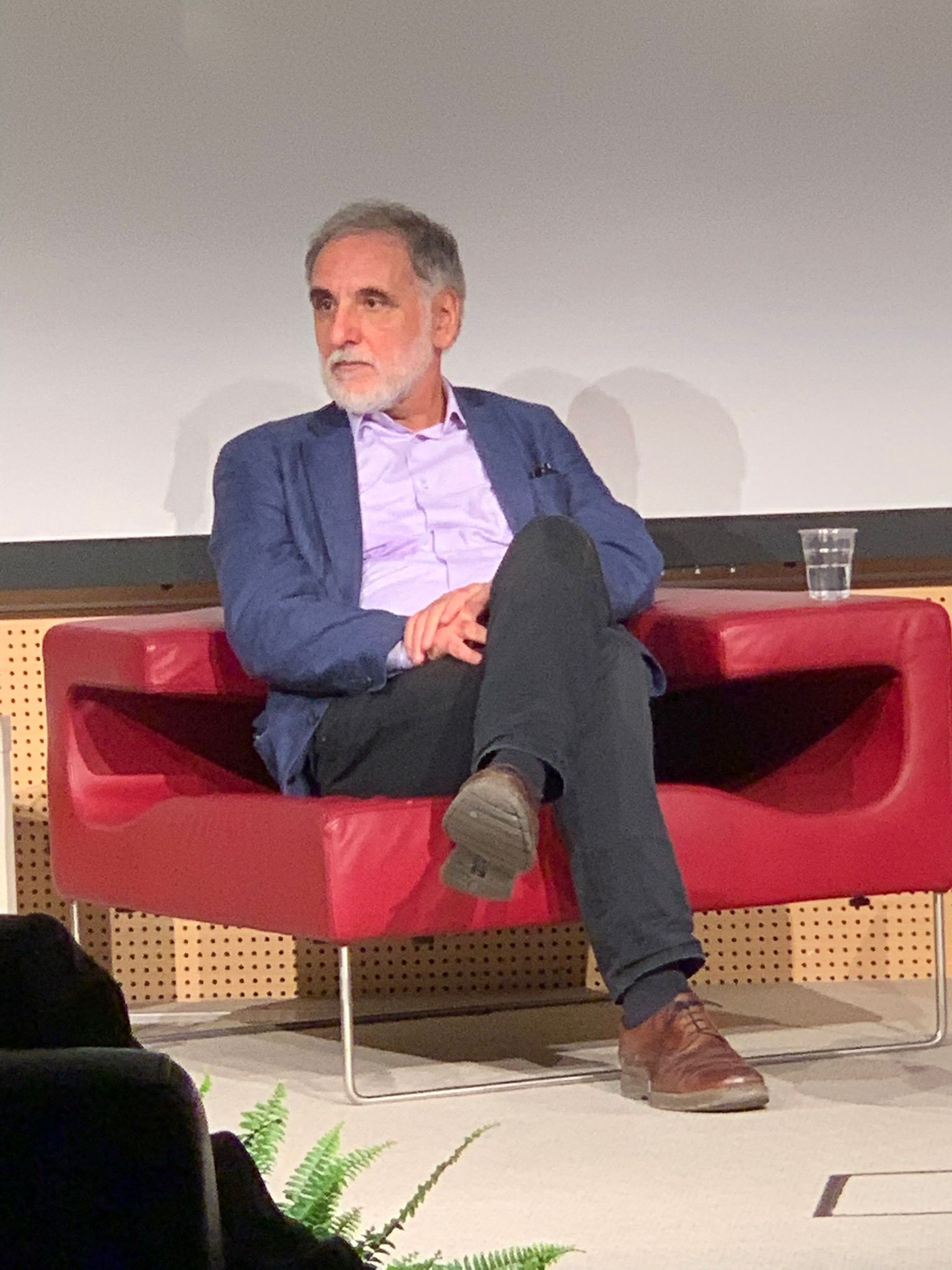
- Born: 26 December 1955 (age 70); Milan, Italy
- Occupations: University professor, novelist, short story writer, poet, literary critic and reviewer
- Writing career
- Genres: Novel, short story, poetry
- Notable works: Verdigris, You, Bleeding Childhood, Tutto il ferro della Torre Eiffel, Rondini sul filo, Leggenda privata
- Movement: Postmodernism

Michele Mari (born 26 December 1955) is an Italian novelist, short story writer, academic critic and poet, considered one of Italy's most esteemed and original living authors. The son of a Milanese industrial designer and artist, Enzo Mari, Mari teaches Italian literature at the Università Statale di Milano; he is considered one of the leading experts of 18th century Italian literature. English translations of his work have won the O. Henry Prize, two PEN Translates Awards, the 2025 PEN Translation Prize (for his novel Verdigris) and the 2026 Strega Prize (for his novel I conviati di pietra).

== Important themes ==
Mari is a philologist and a connoisseur of science fiction (see his poetic essay "Le copertine di Urania" in Tu, sanguinosa infanzia, 1997) and comics. In his short stories, the theme of childhood and adolescence as moments to be devoutly preserved recurs often (cf. the story "I palloni del signor Kurtz", in Euridice aveva un cane, 1993); other important motifs are the obsession for other people's life that one could not live (in the short story "Euridice aveva un cane", 1993, or in Rondini sul filo, 1999), of literature as ersatz life, of memory and its workings (Verderame, 2007).

Mari intensely dislikes change, so he mistrusts modernity in its more vulgar and showy aspects; he is fascinated by obsessive personalities (Walter Benjamin in Tutto il ferro della Torre Eiffel, Roger Waters in Rosso Floyd); he nonchalantly mixes fact and fiction in his works, both in those with an overwhelming autobiographic component (Rondini sul filo, Tu, sanguinosa infanzia, Filologia dell'anfibio), and in those novels where he uses, like a puppeteer, historical characters (Benjamin and Marc Bloch - plus countless other writers and artists - in Tutto il ferro della Torre Eiffel, the Italian romantic poet Giacomo Leopardi in Io venia pien d'angoscia a rimirarti, the members of the Pink Floyd band in Rosso Floyd).

Mari is a parodist, whose prose may easily imitate that of more famous authors. He has a style similar to that of other Italian fiction writers like Carlo Emilio Gadda, Tommaso Landolfi and Giorgio Manganelli, and also the French author Louis-Ferdinand Céline (especially in Rondini sul filo). His two novels Verderame and Rosso Floyd, though continuing Mari's stylistic care and formal innovation (especially the latter), achieved some real suspense by borrowing narrative devices from crime, gothic, and horror fiction (something Mari had already done at the beginning of his career in his second novel, Io venia pien d'angoscia a rimirarti).

Mari won the Premio Grinzane Cavour in 2008, as Supervincitore of the Narrativa italiana section, with his novel Verderame.

Mari is also a poet (Cento poesie d'amore a Ladyhawke, Einaudi 2007) and an academic scholar (his essays include L'Iliade di Vincenzo Monti, 1982; Venere celeste e venere terrestre, 1988; Momenti della traduzione fra Settecento e Ottocento, 1994; Il genio freddo: La storiografia letteraria di Girolamo Tiraboschi, 1999); he also wrote essays on European and American fantastic literature (I demoni e la pasta sfoglia, Quiritta 2004). He played in the Osvaldo Soriano Football Club, the Italian writers' national football team.

== Works ==
=== Fiction ===
==== Novels ====
- Di bestia in bestia, Longanesi, 1989.
- Io venia pien d'angoscia a rimirarti, Longanesi, 1990 (rpt. Marsilio, 1998; rpt. Cavallo di Ferro, 2012).
- La stiva e l'abisso, Bompiani 1992 (rpt. Einaudi, 2002).
- Filologia dell'anfibio, Bompiani, 1995 (rpt. Laterza, 2009).
- Rondini sul filo, Mondadori, 1999.
- Tutto il ferro della torre Eiffel, Einaudi, 2002.
- Verderame, Einaudi, 2007; translated as Verdigris by Brian Robert Moore (And Other Stories, 2024).
- Rosso Floyd, Einaudi, 2010 (rpt. Einaudi, 2012).
- Di bestia in bestia (revised edition), Einaudi, 2013.
- Roderick Duddle, Einaudi, 2014.
- Leggenda privata, Einaudi, 2017.
- Le maestose rovine di Sferopoli, Einaudi, 2021.
- Locus desperatus, Einaudi, 2024.
- I convitati di pietra, Einaudi, 2025.

==== Short-Story Collections ====
- Euridice aveva un cane, Bompiani, 1993 (rpt. Einaudi, 2004).
- Tu, sanguinosa infanzia, Mondadori, 1997 (rpt. Mondadori, 1999; Einaudi, 2009), translated into English as You, Bleeding Childhood by Brian Robert Moore (And Other Stories, 2023).
- Fantasmagonia, Einaudi, 2012.

=== Poetry ===
- I sepolcri illustrati, Portofranco, 2000.
- Cento poesie d'amore a Ladyhawke, Einaudi, 2007.
- Dalla cripta, Einaudi, 2019.

=== Non-fiction ===
- Milano fantasma, EDT, 2008 (illustrated by Velasco Vitali), travelogue.
- I demoni e la pasta sfoglia, Quiritta, 2004 (rpt. Cavallo di Ferro, 2010), essay collection.

== Awards ==
- Di bestia in bestia, Berto prize 1989.
- Io venìa pien d'angoscia a rimirarti, Bergamo prize 1990, Selezione Campiello prize 1990.
- Euridice aveva un cane, Settembrini prize 1993.
- Tu, sanguinosa infanzia, Chiara prize 1997, Palmi prize 1997.
- Rondini sul filo, Vittorini prize 1999, Procida - Elsa Morante prize 1999.
- Tutto il ferro della torre Eiffel, Bagutta prize 2003, Bari prize 2002.
- Cento poesie d'amore a Ladyhawke, Pisa prize 2007, Tassoni prize 2007, La Ginestra prize 2007.
- Verderame, Grinzane Cavour Prize 2007, Chianti prize 2007.
- Rosso Floyd, Frignano prize 2010, Procida - Elsa Morante prize 2010.
- Fantasmagonia, Cocito - Montà d'Alba prize 2012.
- Roderick Duddle, Selezione Campiello prize 2014; Basilicata prize 2014; Asti d'Appello prize 2014; Fabriano prize 2014.
- I convitati di pietra, Strega Prize 2026.

== Selected further reading ==
- "Le ossessioni di Michele Mari", Alice Di Stefano, Sincronie, 2004, n. 16, 185-191.
- "Le strategie ipertestuali di Michele Mari", Alessandro Iovinelli, Narrativa, 2001, n. 20-21, 297-304.
- "Passages della critica e riuso della tradizione letteraria in Michele Mari", Franca Sinopoli, Storia e memoria nelle riletture e riscritture letterarie, Bessière, Jean and Franca Sinopoli (Eds.), Roma, Bulzoni, 2005, 126-42.
- Michele Mari, Carlo Mazza Galanti, Cadmo - Scritture in corso, 2011
