= Isabella Camera d'Afflitto =

Italian Arabist and translator (born 1948)

Isabella Camera d'Afflitto (born 1948 in Salerno) is an Italian academic and translator, regarded as one of Italy's leading Arabists. She teaches modern Arabic literature at La Sapienza University in Rome, and has written numerous books and scholarly articles on the subject. She oversees the Contemporary Arab Writers series published by Jouvence in Rome, and has supervised the translation of more than 30 major Arabic literary works to date.

She was awarded the Grinzane Cavour Prize in 2006. She has also served on the judging panel of the International Prize for Arabic Fiction.
