= The Last of the Vostiaks =

- 2002 Italian edition (publ. Bompiani)
- Author: Diego Marani
- Original title: L'ultimo dei Vostiachi
- Language: Italian
- Publication place: Italy

The Last of the Vostiaks (Italian: L'ultimo dei Vostiachi; also published as The Last of the Vostyachs) is a 2001 novel by the Italian writer Diego Marani. It is a satire of bias and prejudice in academic and philological research. It raises questions about language as an identity symbol and the solitude of the last speaker of a language about to disappear.

== Plot ==
The central character is a Siberian native, who has been prisoner in a Gulag and who speaks a language that has almost disappeared, one that keeps the last vestige of a vanished sound, the lateral fricative with labiovelar appendix. A Russian student comes to understand him and wants to show him to a congress on Uralic languages in Helsinki. However, a purist Finnish professor attempts to prevent the innocent Siberian appearance there as a living proof of the philological connection between the Finnish language and the American natives. The plot includes a Lapp pimp, country cottages with saunas, vacation boats in the Baltic Sea, and sometimes the narration takes a rowdy tone with reminiscences of Wilt by Tom Sharpe.

== Language Itself ==
The language itself is said by some readers to be a descendant of Proto-Uralo-Siberian.

== Reception ==
The novel was longlisted for the Independent Foreign Fiction Prize (2013).
