= Rupa Bajwa =

Indian writer

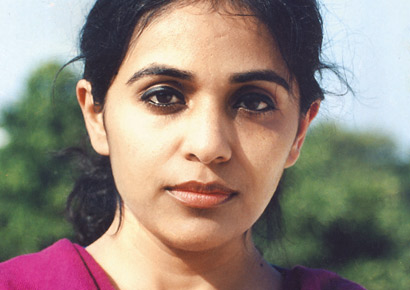
- Born: Amritsar, Punjab, India
- Writing career
- Language: English
- Notable awards: Long listed for the Orange Prize for Fiction in 2004.; The XXIV Grinzane Cavour Prize for best first novel in June 2005.; The Commonwealth Award in 2005.; India's Sahitya Akademi Award English 2006.

Rupa Bajwa is an Indian writer who lives and works in Amritsar, Punjab as well as spending time in various other Indian cities and towns. She is a recipient of the Grinzane Cavour Prize, the Commonwealth Award, and India's Sahitya Akademi Award.

== Novels ==
In 2004, she published her first novel, The Sari Shop, which explores her hometown and the class dynamics of India. The novel won the writer flattering reviews, with reviewers calling her India's new literary find. The Sari Shop was long listed for the Orange Prize for Fiction in 2004. The novel won the XXIV Grinzane Cavour Prize for best first novel in June 2005, the Commonwealth Award in 2005 and India's Sahitya Akademi Award English 2006. The Sari Shop has been translated in several languages, among them: French ( Le vendeur de saris), Dutch (De Sariwinkel) and Serbian (Prodavnica sarija) and Italian.

Rupa Bajwa's second novel, Tell Me a Story, was released in April 2012. It was met with extreme reactions. It received critical appreciation from some quarters, at the same time creating controversy among the literary circles in New Delhi, since a part of this novel lampooned these very people.

Currently, Rupa Bajwa is working on her third novel.

== Columns ==
Though she is from a Sikh family, Bajwa wrote a controversial piece called "Dark Things Do Happen in Gurdwaras Sometimes", in The Telegraph, an Indian newspaper.

== Works ==
- 2004 The Sari Shop
- 2012 Tell Me a Story
