= Elena Loewenthal =

Italian historian and translator (born 1960)

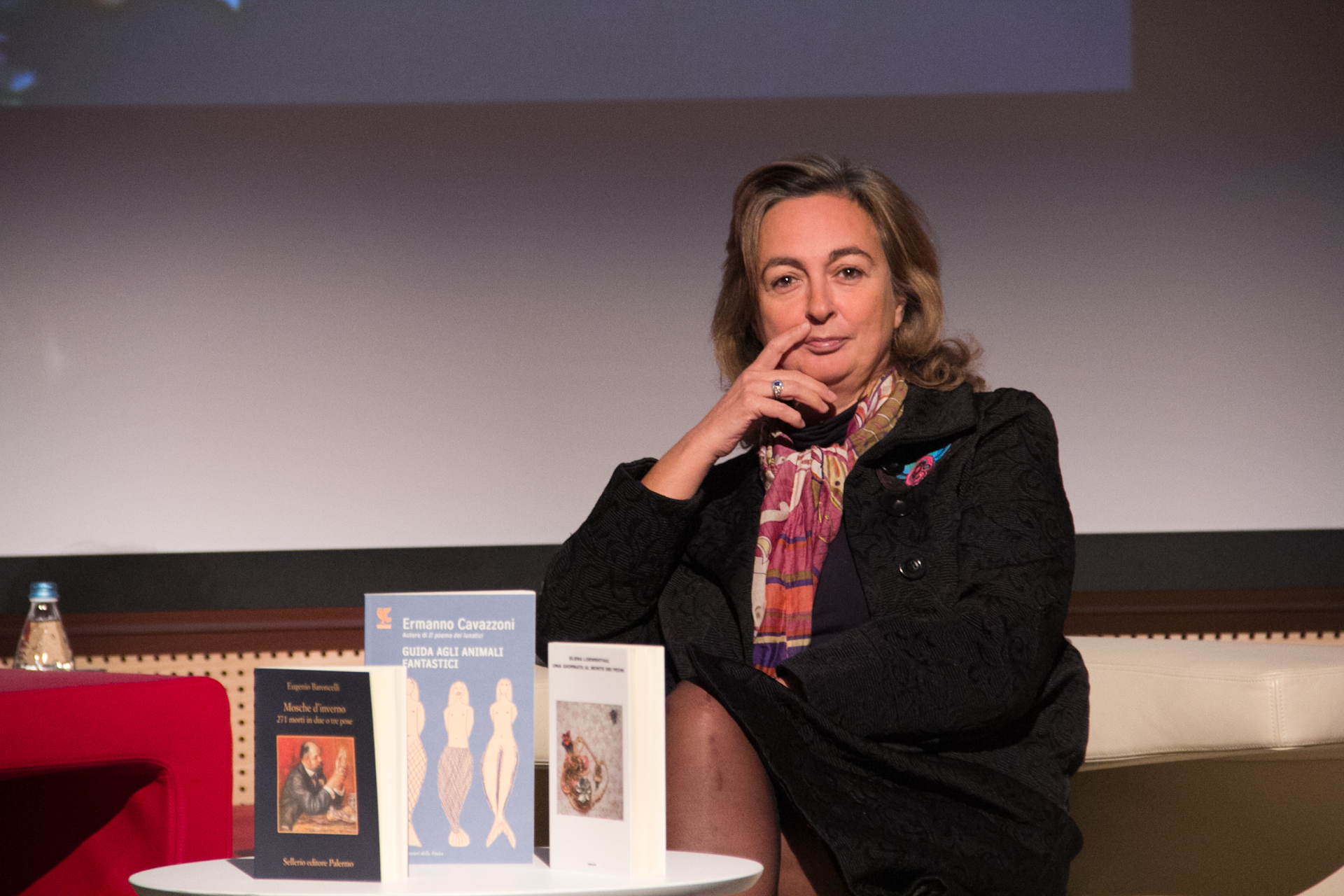
Elena Loewenthal

Elena Loewenthal (born 22 January 1960 in Turin) is an Italian historian and translator, specialising in Jewish history, having translated Louis Ginzberg's The Legends of the Jews in its six volumes into Italian under the Adelphi Edizioni publishing house. She was awarded the Grinzane Cavour Prize in 2003.
