= Emanuela Casti =

Italian geographer

Emanuela Casti (born 1950 in Mira, Venice, Italy) is an Italian geographer and a cartography theorist. Considered an innovator, she has formalized a semiotic theory for the interpretation of maps in their various forms: from historical maps to cybercartography systems. She was full professor from 2001 to 2020 at the University of Bergamo (Italy) and is currently professor emeritus. In 2004 Casti founded the Diathesis Cartographic Lab, a permanent laboratory devoted to territorial analysis, cartographic innovation and experimentation and, in 2019, designed and activated the interclass master's degree, in Geourbanistica. Analisi e pianificazione territoriale, urbana, ambientale e valorizzazione del paesaggio at the University of Bergamo

== Academic career ==
Having graduated from the University of Padua with a thesis on the historical evolution of cartography in Mantua, professor Casti started her academic research in 1983, when she was appointed researcher at the same university. Casti became an associate professor at the University of Bergamo in 1992 and full professor in 2001. She also taught courses, lectures and seminars at other academic institution both in Italy (University of Turin) and abroad (EPFL - École Polytechnique Fédérale de Lausanne, Parigi VII - Paris- Diderot).

She has been involved in research groups both at the national level and internationally. Casti is also a member of many leading Italian societies (AGeI, SGI, RGI, AIIGI) and international workgroups (UGI, ICA).

After starting her career as a specialist on Venetian historical cartography, Casti has widened the scope of her research to embrace various historical periods. She has extensively analyzed the role of maps in the Italian region of Lombardy in the Renaissance and Early Modern times and addressed key issues in Italian and French colonial cartography. Far from being regarded as mere historical artifacts, these cartographic examples provided a solid background for empirical and applied analysis. On the basis of such maps, professor Casti developed her theory of cartographic semiosis.

Concerning territorialist issues, Africa has long been the privileged object of professor Casti's numerous on-site surveys, well over thirty since 1992. In this context, she conducted applied research regarding environmental protection and cooperation with countries in the developing world, working within the framework of EU programs, of the International Union for Conservation of Nature (IUCN) and of UNESCO. In particular, Casti participated in projects for the management of the buffer zones of protected areas in West Africa: i.e. the 2002-2005 collaborative project with the French CIRAD research center of Montpellier involving the W Transboundary Biosphere Reserve of Niger, Benin and Burkina Faso; and the 2006-2009 collaboration with the excellence university center 2iE- Institut International d'Ingéniérie de l'Eau et de l'Environnement di Ouagadougou - Arly Protection and Conservation Unit in Burkina Faso.

In Italy, she has carried out analyses on environmental protection (orobiemap.unibg.it), urban periphery regeneration (rifoit.unibg.it/rifomap) and participatory processes (cittaaltaplurale.unibg.it; bgopenmapping.unibg.it; www.bgpublicspace.it), experimenting with new graphical visualizations of big data. Moreover, in 2020 she set up and directed a research on socio-territorial aspects and spatial spread of COVID-19 contagion in Italy.

Emanuela Casti is currently pursuing her line of theoretical and applied research in the field of cartography, semiotically interpreting the prehistoric maps of Valcamonica (Valle Camonica, Italy).

== Main achievements ==
=== Theory of cartographic semiosis ===
Professor Casti elaborated the theory of cartographic semiosis in 1998, when she also published her first theoretical book L’ordine del mondo e la sua rappresentazione, translated into English in 2005 under the title Reality as Representation. The semiotics of cartography and the generation of meaning. Casti's theory was placed (Azócar, Buchroithner, 2014) at first, within the research area called "postmodern cartography" inaugurated by John B. Harley in 1989. The basic assumption of postmodern research is a questioning of the objectivity and neutrality of maps, and more specifically the ability of Euclidean metrics to represent the World. Consequently, maps are not seen as mere "mirrors of reality", but rather as tools through which reality is modeled. Casti's innovative contribution lies in having embraced this initial assumption as a springboard for articulating a theory able to investigate the construction and the communicative mechanisms of maps.

By shifting the focus of interest from maps as tools for mediating territory to maps as operators which actively influence territorial action, Casti, in her second theoretical book Cartografia critica. Dal topos alla chora (2013)(trad.: Reflexive Cartography. A Modern Perspective in Mapping, Elsevier, MA, 2015), explores the transition from a topographic mapping, created by government agencies, to open cartography, collaboratively produced by the people (and linked to a new idea of chorography). The latter has the potential to become a highly workable concept, to be used as an operator for assisting citizens in thinking and designing their way of inhabiting and understanding their spatial values. Specifically, Casti argues that, by virtue of its highly interactive features, new digital chorography (specifically WebGIS) opens up new scenarios, and poses cybercartography as a privileged discipline for recovering and promoting the social meaning of the territory in all its configurations (landscape, environment, place).

=== SIGAP strategy and participatory mapping ===
The SIGAP strategy (Geographic Information Systems for Protected Areas /Participatory Action) is a research methodology that adopts cartographic semiosis and tests its actual range of application. It takes up concepts presented by international agencies - such as "sustainability", "conservation participation" - and turns them into operational tools for territorial and environmental planning. Tested in various national and international contexts with regard to a variety of issues (migration, environmental protection, landscape planning, tourism systems, urban regeneration, etc.), the SIGAP methodology deploys the typical range of geography-based competences in the field of applied research. As such it involves all stages of analysis: the adoption of a theory informing land methodology; interaction with local inhabitants for the reading of data; construction of interpretative models and their cartographic visualization. In each of these stages, cartography takes on different capacities depending on the goal to be pursued. The final product is an interactive multimedia system GIS which becomes as an invaluable tool for field research, for the implementation of intervention strategies, for the processing and circulation of data. Participatory mapping systems play an essential role in this context, because they can recover the role of local communities and produce cartographic representations that take account of local interests.

== Projects ==
Environmental protection:

Multimap RBT W – Réserve de la Biosphère Transfrontalière W

Parc National d’Arly (E. Casti, S. Yonkeu, Le Parc National d’Arly et la falaise du Gobnangou - Burkina Faso, L’Harmattan, Parigi, 2009)

Orobiemap

Participatory mapping

BG Open Mapping

BG Public Space

Urban regeneration and land use:

RIFO/it

Restructuring ex-GRES Area, Bergamo

s-Low Tourism:

Centrality of territories. Towards a regeneration of Bergamo in a European network

== Publications ==
Emanuela Casti has over a hundred publications in Italian, French and English. Among these:

=== Monographs ===
- L’ordine del mondo e la sua rappresentazione, Unicopli, Milano, 1998. (trad. Reality as Representation. The Semiotics of Cartography and the Generation of Meaning, Bergamo University Press, Bergamo, 2000).
- Cartografia critica. Dal topos alla chora, Guerini Ed., Milano, 2013 (trad. Reflexive Cartography, A Modern Perspective in Mapping, Amsterdam/Waltham, Elsevier, 2015).

=== Curatorships ===
- E. Casti (a cura), La geografia a Bergamo: nuove sfide per l'analisi territoriale e il mapping, AGeI, Roma, 2019.
- with Fulvio Adobati and Ilia Negri (Eds.), Mapping the Epidemic. A Systemic Geography of Covid-19 in Italy, Amsterdam/Waltham, Elsevier, 2021.

=== Journal articles (from 2018) ===
- “Bedolina: Map or Tridimensional Model?”, in: Cartographica, vol. 53, n. 1, 2018, pp. 15–35.
- “Semiosi cartografica e incisioni rupestri: verso un'interpretazione della mappa di Bedolina” in: Rivista geografica italiana, vol. 125, n. 2, 2018, pp. 133–154;
- “Geografia a "vele spiegate". Analisi territoriale e mapping riflessivo sul COVID-19 in Italia”, in: Documenti Geografici, n. 1, 2020, pp. 61–83.

=== Book chapters ===
- “Introduction. Territorial analysis and reflexive mapping on the Covid-19 infection”, in: Casti Emanuela with Fulvio Adobati and Ilia Negri (Eds.), Mapping the Epidemic. A Systemic Geography of Covid-19 in Italy, Amsterdam/Waltham, Elsevier, 2021, pp. 1–15.
- with E. Consolandi, “Italy into three parts: The space–time spread of contagion”, in: Casti Emanuela with Fulvio Adobati and Ilia Negri (Eds.), Mapping the Epidemic. A Systemic Geography of Covid-19 in Italy, Amsterdam/Waltham, Elsevier, 2021, pp. 29–39.
- “Conclusions. Towards spatial vulnerability management for a new "happy" living”, in; Casti Emanuela with Fulvio Adobati and Ilia Negri (Eds.), Mapping the Epidemic. A Systemic Geography of Covid-19 in Italy, Amsterdam/Waltham, Elsevier, 2021, pp. 217–225.
