= H.O.W. Journal =

- Editors: Alison Weaver, Natasha Radojcic
- Categories: Literary magazine
- Frequency: Biennial
- Circulation: 4000
- Founded: 2006
- Final issue: Spring/Summer 2017
- Country: USA
- Based in: New York City
- Language: English
- Website: howjournal.com

H.O.W. Journal was a bi-annual non-profit art & literary journal founded in 2006. It featured a mix of prominent contemporary writers and artists alongside upcoming talents in a variety of disciplines—fiction, non-fiction, poetry, and visual art.

H.O.W. Journal was published each spring and fall. Each issue release was accompanied by a fund-raising event.

H.O.W. raised funds to start an art, music and film-making program for Safe Space—a foster home in Queens, New York. The last issue was 13 published in Spring/Summer 2017.

== History ==
H.O.W. Journal was founded by Alison Weaver and Natasha Radojcic in 2006. They sought to create an intellectually and aesthetically stimulating art and literature journal featuring established as well as emerging artists from various genres. They continue to work with Stamatis Birsimijoglou, Art Director, to create a visually stunning magazine.

The H.O.W. acronym stands for Helping Orphans Worldwide and it refers to the second goal of the founding editors. H.O.W. Journal, Helping Orphans Worldwide, Inc. is a 501(c)(3) non-profit, tax exempt organization. Proceeds from the journal have been used in an ongoing effort to raise money and awareness for various orphan-related humanitarian causes.

The dual goals of HOW have been summed up by founding editor Alison Weaver as follows:

The vision we had when creating H.O.W was to appeal to a young, modern readership who hold both an avid interest in the arts as well as a general compulsion toward social consciousness. H.O.W. gives its readers a visually hip journal filled with talented artists and writers, while at the same time allowing them to support children that are in dire need of our help. I have noticed a shift in the world over the last decade, and I believe the new generation feels an urge to actively make a difference. H.O.W. gives them an opportunity to do just that.

H.O.W. Journal is published biannually. Each issue launch is accompanied by a fund-raising event that both promotes the journal and contributes to the goal of raising money and awareness of the charity being supported.

H.O.W. Journal is currently based in Tribeca.

== Events ==
Past events that H.O.W. Journal has hosted for issue launches have incorporated costume parties, literary contests, and silent auctions featuring designer clothing and jewelry, gift certificates, and many wonderful pieces of art donated by H.O.W. Journal contributors. Events have been held at venues such as Macao Trading Co. in Tribeca, New York City and Carly Simon's Midnight Farm store on Martha's Vineyard.

Events have also included guest readings from prominent authors and contributors such as Catherine O'Hara, Ben Taylor, Carly Simon, Harold Ramis, Susan Minot, Mary Gaitskill, David Gates, Justin Taylor, Jonathan Lethem, Barry Yourgrau, Tao Lin, Willie Perdomo, Joan Benefeil, Sam Lipsyte, Eileen Myles, Geraldine Brooks, Fanny Howe, Honor Moore, Alexandra Styron, Natasha Radojcic, and Greg Sanders, as well as musical performances by Stephanie McKay and the indie rock band Drug Rug.

By hosting these literary events, H.O.W. Journal has successfully raised over $40,000 to date in aid of charity.

== Charities ==
From its inception, the artistic goals of HOW Journal have been coupled with an effort to support charitable organizations working to aid some of the approximately 163 million children throughout the world that have been orphaned (12 million of those orphaned by AIDS as the number rises every 15 seconds).

Currently HOW is raising funds to help start an art, music and film-making program for young adults at Safe Space. If successful, this program will give the city's most at-risk youth the opportunity to work creatively and express themselves in new mediums. The program will help develop the self-confidence and self-esteem necessary to lead positive and productive lives. Safe Space, more generally, is an organization that offers residential foster care to children that have aged out of the foster care system or are not accepted by it. It is a family-like, therapeutic environment where children receive the structure, acceptance, guidance and resources they need in order to thrive and grow up to lead positive and productive lives.

Past charities supported by HOW Journal have included:

- Atetegeb Worku Memorial Orphanage in Addis Ababa, Ethiopia run by Haregewoin Tefarra, an Ethiopian woman who opened her home to hundreds of children orphaned by HIV/AIDS, and whose inspiring life story is documented in Melissa Fay Greene's There Is No Me Without You: One Woman's Odyssey to Rescue Africa's Children.
- SOS Children's Village in Zanzibar, Tanzania, an international non-governmental social development organization that has been active in the field of children's rights, needs, and concerns since 1949. Active in 132 countries and territories, SOS focuses on children without parental care or from families in difficult circumstances.

== Contests ==
H.O.W. Journal hosted its first short story contest to be judged by acclaimed author Susan Minot. The contest was open to all writers and all themes. Winners would be published and receive cash prizes.
