= Stewart Kaye =

Scottish architect (1885–1952)

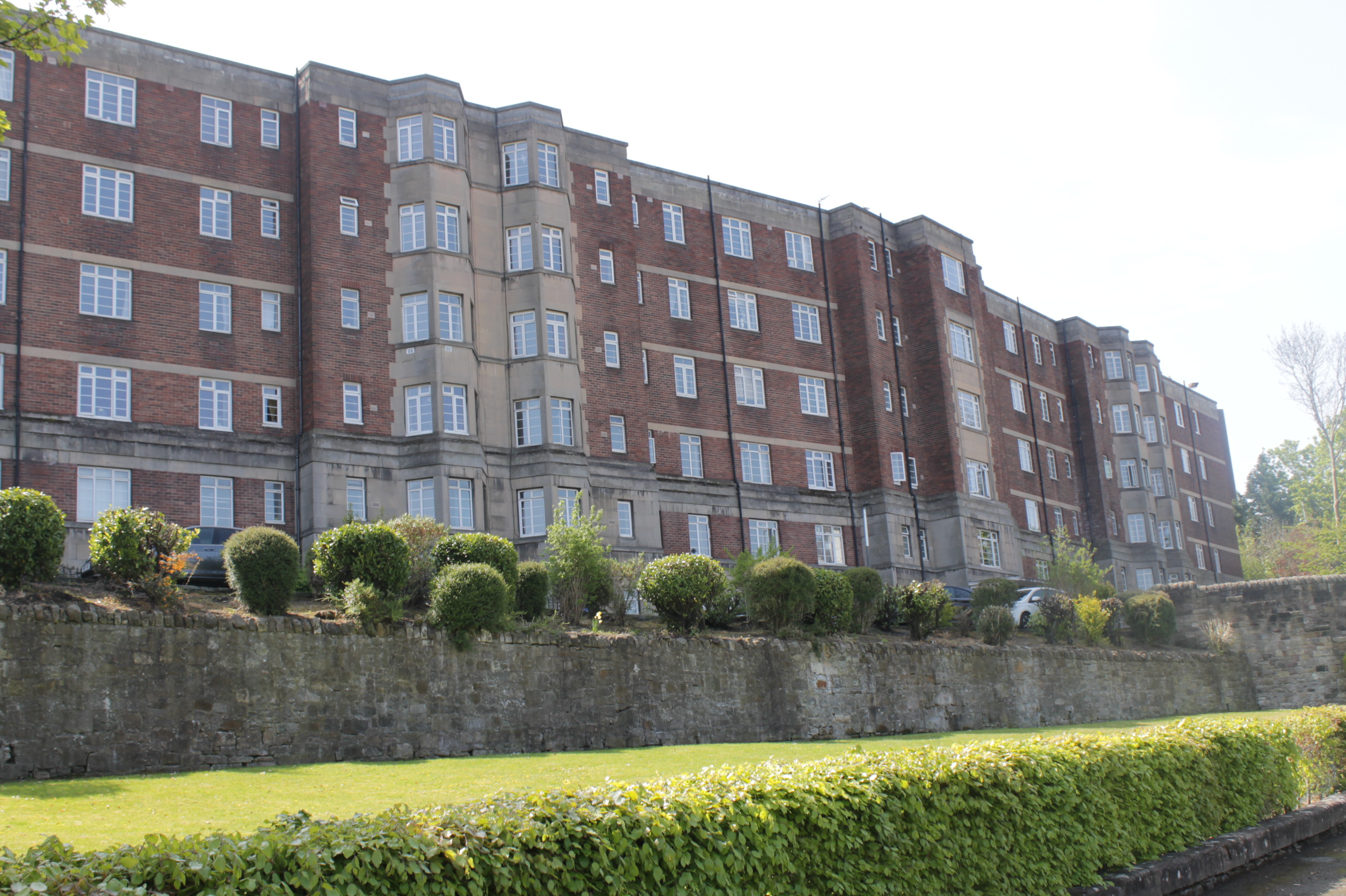
Learmonth Court, Edinburgh

Stewart Kaye FRIBA FRICS (1885–1952) was a Scottish architect in the 20th century. Working in a stripped down Scottish version of the Art Deco style he was consultant architect to the Presbytery of East Lothian and the Halifax Building Society. Mainly based in Edinburgh he is responsible for a large proportion of the city's housing estates from the 1930s.

== Life ==
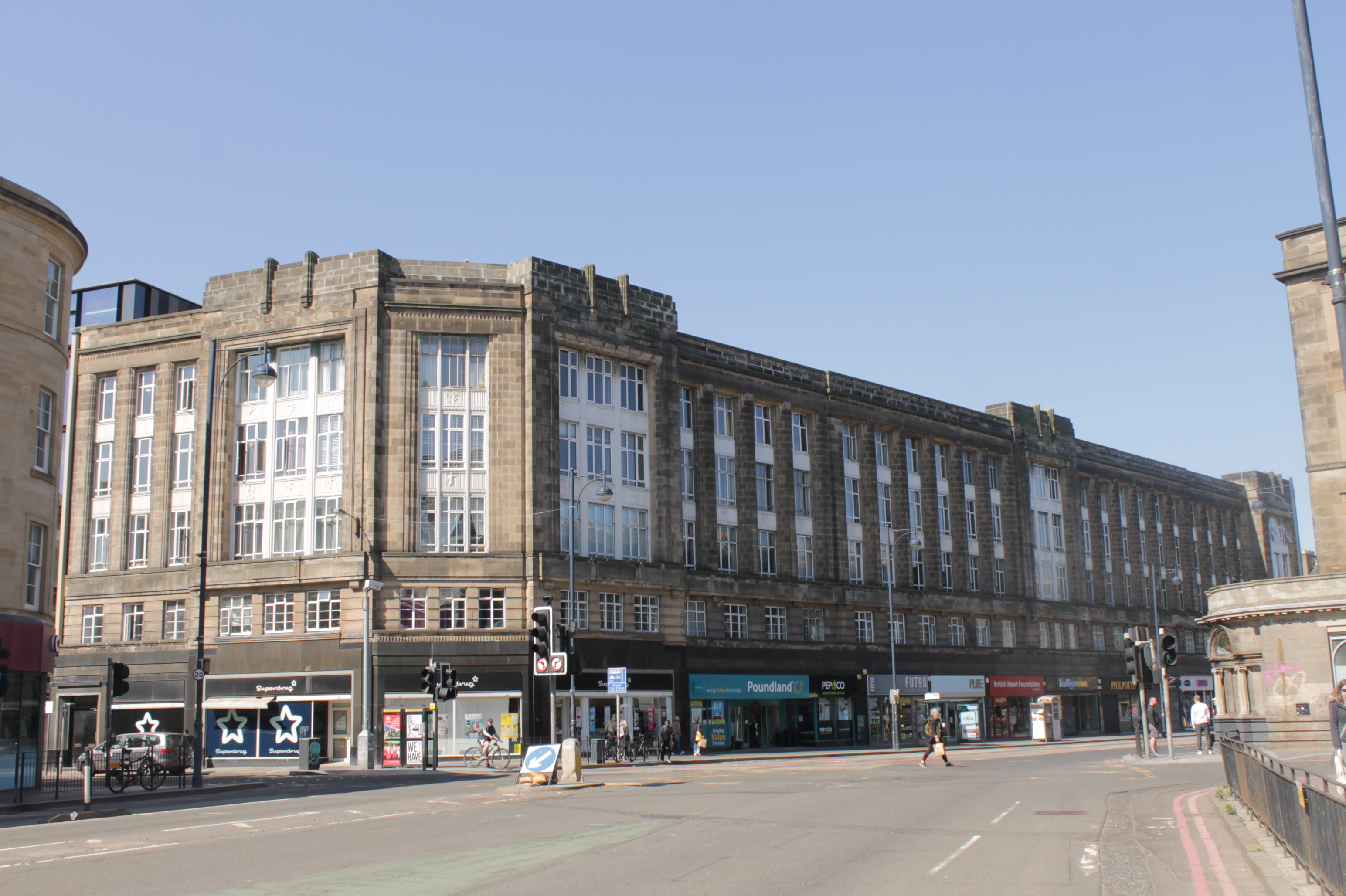
Lothian House, Lothian Road, Edinburgh

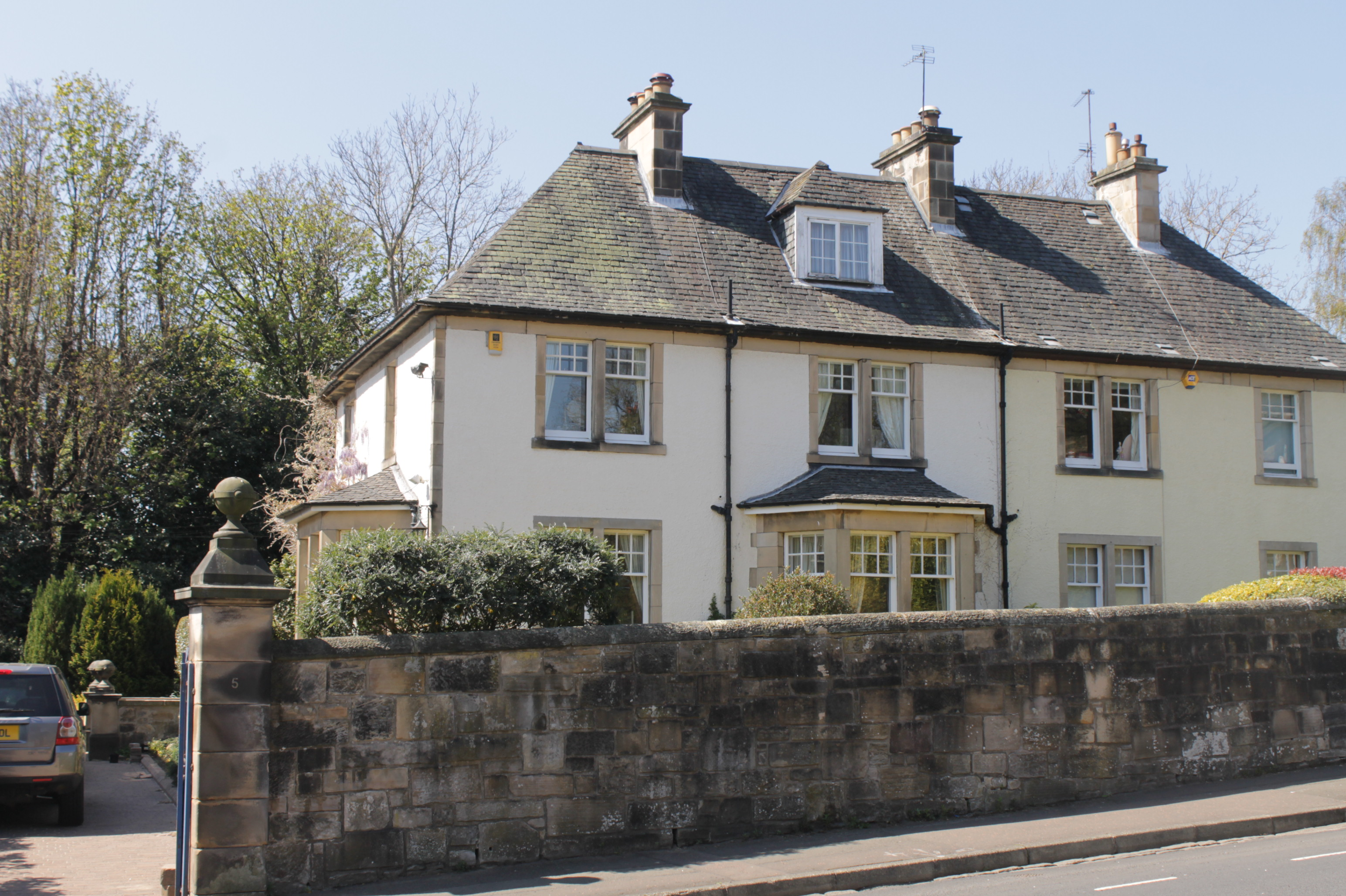
5 Wester Coates Terrace, Edinburgh

He was born in or near Broughty Ferry near Dundee in 1885 the son of James Kaye a cashier with the North British Railway Company. He was educated at Grove Academy in Dundee. He then studied engineering and architecture at the Technical College in Dundee and Dundee University and was articled to James McLaren of Dundee before traveling more widely: he spent some time with George Rivell in Alnwick; then George W. B. Rees in Cardiff; J. E. Rickards in London. In 1905 he did a study tour in the Netherlands and Belgium and in 1906 went to Italy.

He set up practice in 1913 in Dunfermline but moved to Gillespie Crescent in Edinburgh in 1914. His career was interrupted by the First World War, during which he first served with the Royal Scots then was commissioned into the Royal Engineers, reaching the rank of Captain. He was demobbed in 1919 and resumed his career. He was proposed as a member of the RIBA in 1920 by Alexander Lorne Campbell and Harold Tarbolton. He was also a Fellow of the Institute of Chartered Surveyors.

In 1925 he was involved in making a photographic record of Amisfield House in East Lothian prior to its demolition.

Between the wars he oversaw and designed some truly huge housing schemes in Edinburgh, in liaison with City Architect Ebenezer James MacRae who also worked with Kaye on Gogarburn Hospital.

In the Second World War he was Director of Emergency Works in Scotland (a highly important role) and was involved in the location and specification of the structure of air raid shelters across the country.

When he returned to work after the war, despite his son joining the firm, his style was well out of date. He retired due to ill health soon after taking on Colin McWilliam as an assistant at his offices at 13 Thistle Street.

In later life he lived at 5 Wester Coates Terrace; a large semi-detached villa in West Edinburgh.

He died on 17 February 1952 and is buried in the 20th century detached north extension to Dean Cemetery in west Edinburgh. The grave faces north onto the third east–west path from the entrance.

== Main works ==
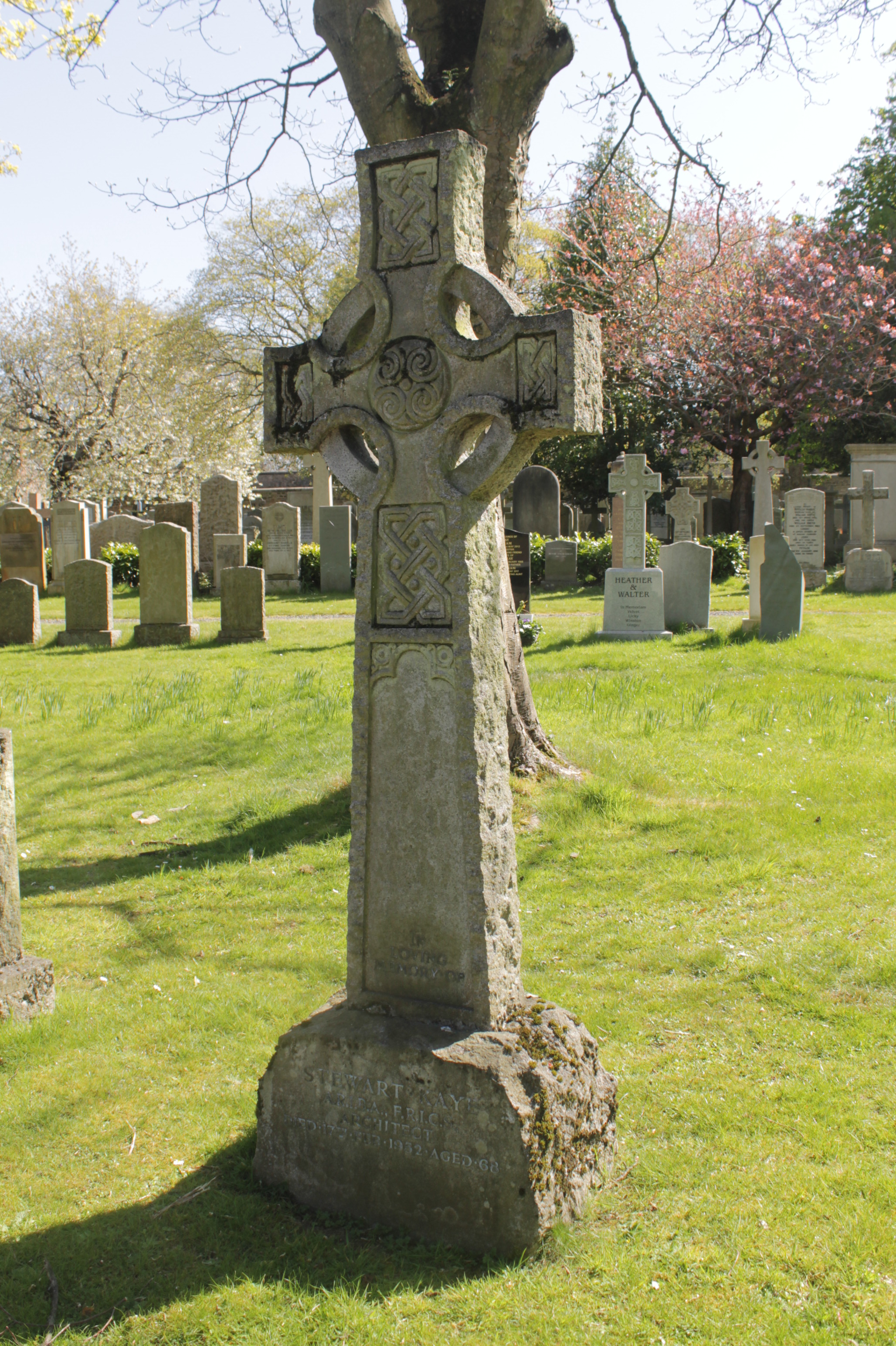
The grave of Stewart Kaye, Dean Cemetery

- Arcade and shops, Cowdenbeath (1912)
- YMCA building, Ayr (1913)
- Naval Institute, Invergordon (1914)
- Sailors Institute, Greenock (1914/5)
- YMCA building, Rosyth (1914/5)
- Brucefield housing estate, Dunfermline (1919)
- Upgrade of Hawthornden Castle (1926)
- Gogarburn Mental Hospital (1927)
- 2-8 Cockburn Street Edinburgh (1928)
- Offices for Edinburgh Evening News, Market Street, Edinburgh (1928)
- Restoration and remodelling of Yester Parish Church (c.1931)
- Huge housing estate at East Pilton, in north Edinburgh for Edinburgh Corporation (1932–36)
- Parsons Green housing estate, Jock's Lodge, east Edinburgh (1934)
- Silverknowes housing estate, north Edinburgh (1934)
- Carrick Knowe housing estate, west Edinburgh (1934)
- Crewe Road housing scheme, west Edinburgh (1936)
- Lothian House, Lothian Road, Edinburgh (including cinema) (1936–39)
- West Pilton housing scheme (1936)
- Housing estate (bungalows) Craigcrook and Hillpark in west Edinburgh (1937)
- Colinton Mains housing estate, south-west Edinburgh (1937)
- Hotel and shops Shandwick Place (south) central Edinburgh (1937)
- Broomhouse housing estate, western Edinburgh (1938)
- Learmonth Court flats at Learmonth Avenue in Edinburgh (1938, completed 1946)
- Cardboard Box factory, Bonnington Road, Leith (1939) now converted to flats
- Conversion of Bonaly Tower to flats (1939)
- Offices for Grant & Co, Garscube Road Glasgow (1948)
- Carrick Knowe Church (1951)
