= Paolo Cesaretti =

Italian historian (born 1957)

- Born: 1957 (age 68–69); Milan, Italy
- Occupations: Historian, Translator

Paolo Cesaretti (born 1957 in Milan) is an Italian historian, lecturer from the University of Bergamo. He is professor of Byzantine civilization and Roman history.

== Biography ==
He is the author of works on Byzantine hagiography (6th-11th centuries), the Byzantine philological tradition (6th-12th centuries), Late Antiquity and the 6th century, as well as the relations between Byzantium and the West.

He is also the author of monographs, critical editions, articles published in international newspapers, as well as translations such as the Secret History of Procopius of Caesarea in Italian in 1996.

In 2002, he is rewarded with the Grinzane Cavour Prize in the "Best Non-fiction" category for his biography of the empress Theodora.

He teaches Byzantine civilization at the University Gabriele Annunzio de Chieti and at the Fondation Cardinal Giovanni of Milan.

He has also giving seminars on Byzantine hagiography of the 10th century.

== Publications ==
- Theodora: Empress of Byzantium , Vendome Press, 2004
- Ravenna. Gli splendori di un Impero, 2005
- L'impero perduto. Vita di Anna di Bisanzio, una sovrana tra Oriente e Occidente, 2006
- Le quattro mogli dell'imperatore. Storia di Leone VI di Bisanzio e della sua corte, 2015
