= Candia McWilliam =

Scottish writer

- Born: 1 July 1955 (age 71); Edinburgh, Scotland
- Education: Girton College, Cambridge
- Occupation: Writer
- Writing career
- Genre: Literary
- Notable awards: Guardian Fiction Prize Debatable Land; 1994 Premio Grinzane Cavour(Italy) Debatable Land, for the best foreign novel of the year 1994 McVitie's Prize for Scottish Writer of the Year, Debatable Land, shortlist 1994 Scottish Arts Council Book Award, A Little Stranger; 1989 McVitie's Prize for Scottish Writer of the Year, A Little Stranger, shortlist 1989 Scottish Arts Council Book Award, A Case of Knives; 1988 Betty Trask Prize, A Case of Knives, joint winner 1988

Candia Frances Juliet McWilliam (born 1 July 1955) is a Scottish author. Her father was the architectural writer and academic Colin McWilliam. She was elected a Fellow of the Royal Society of Literature in 1994.

== Literary career ==
Born in Edinburgh, McWilliam was educated at St George's School for Girls in the city and Girton College, Cambridge, where she obtained first class honours. Her first novel, A Case of Knives, published in 1988, was the winner of a Betty Trask Prize. Her second novel, A Little Stranger, was published in 1989. Both books won Scottish Arts Council Book Awards.

Debatable Land, published in 1994, won the Guardian Fiction Prize, and in 1998 its Italian translation won the Premio Grinzane Cavour for the best foreign novel of the year. McWilliam was a judge of the 2006 Man Booker Prize.

== Blindness ==
In 2004 McWilliam admitted to an audience at the Edinburgh International Book Festival that she had struggled with alcoholism. In early 2006, McWilliam began to experience the effects of blepharospasm and became severely visually impaired as a result. This illness caused her eyelids to be permanently shut, although her eyes were still functional. In 2007 she spoke about the experience of blindness at the Edinburgh International Book Festival, and in 2008 she wrote an article about her situation for the Scottish Review of Books. In 2009 she underwent an operation which harvested tendons from her leg in order to suspend her eyelids open, thus curing her blindness.

In an article in The Sunday Times, McWilliam described her two years of blindness and the pioneering surgery that restored her sight. She went blind, she added, after years of writer's block — her last novel appeared in 1994 — but she refound her voice while she was blind and dictated to a kind young friend what turned out to be a memoir, What to Look for in Winter, which was published in 2010. She is now at work on a novel.

== Family and personal life ==
McWilliam's first marriage to Quentin Wallop, 10th Earl of Portsmouth, produced a daughter and a son, Viscount Lymington, but ended in divorce. Her second marriage to Fram Dinshaw resulted in another son. She lived briefly with the Labour MP Mark Fisher.

== Bibliography ==
- A Case of Knives (1988)
- A Little Stranger (1989)
- Debatable Land (1994)
- Wait Till I Tell You (1997) (short stories)
- What to Look for in Winter: A Memoir in Blindness (2010)
