= Diego Marani =

Italian writer and translator (born 1959)

- Born: 1959 (age 66–67); Tresigallo, Ferrara, Italy
- Occupations: novelist, European civil servant
- Known for: Inventor of Europanto

Diego Marani (born 1959) is an Italian novelist and European civil servant.

== Biography ==
Born in Tresigallo, Marani attended the Liceo Ginnasio Ariosto in Ferrara till 1978 and graduated in interpretation and translation from the Scuola superiore di lingue moderne per traduttori e interpreti in Trieste in 1983. Upon graduation, he worked as a freelance interpreter and translator as well as a freelance journalist for various local newspapers. Besides English and French, he later studied professionally Dutch, Finnish, Slovene and German languages.

In 1985 Marani started working at the EU Council (DGT) as a translator and revisor, a position he maintained until 2006, when he joined the European Commission's Directorate-General for Culture, and from 2010 the Directorate-General for Interpretation, working in particular on multilingualism policy, support to literary translation, lifelong learning and early language learning. In this period he also served as speechwriter for Leonard Orban, Manuel Barroso, Antonio Tajani, Androulla Vassiliou. In 2014 he served as adviser to the Minister of Culture Dario Franceschini during the Italian Presidency of the EU Council. Since 2015 Marani has worked for the European External Action Service, coordinating cultural diplomacy initiatives.

In 1996, while working as a translator for the Council of the European Union, he invented Europanto, a mock international auxiliary language. Marani has published different articles, short stories and video clips in Europanto.

Marani is also an essayist and novelist. His most famous novel, New Finnish Grammar (Nuova grammatica finlandese), has been translated into several languages and has received the Grinzane Cavour literary prize in Italy. His other novels include Las Adventures des Inspector Cabillot (1998, written in Europanto), L'ultimo dei Vostiach (Premio Campiello, Selezione Giurati) (The Last of the Vostiaks), L'interprete, Il compagno di scuola, and Enciclopedia tresigallese. As an essayist, Marani wrote A Trieste con Svevo and Come ho imparato le lingue. His book, La bicicletta incantata, was made into a movie by Elisabetta Sgarbi, editor in chief of Bompiani publishing house and art producer. A more recent novel of Marani's, Il cane di Dio, was published in 2012 and issued in English as God's Dog in that year as well. Lavorare manca was published in 2014. Marani also regularly writes for the cultural page of the Italian daily Il Sole 24 Ore and is a blogger on eunews.it.
