= Carrick Knowe =

Suburb in the west of Edinburgh, Scotland

Coordinates: 55°56′10.46″N 3°16′20.40″W

Carrick Knowe is a suburb in the west of Edinburgh in Scotland, located approximately 3 miles from the city centre. It is bordered by Tyler's Acre to the north, the Glasgow/Aberdeen railway line to the south, Carrick Knowe Golf Course to the east, and Saughton Road North to the west. The catchment area for the primary school encompasses this entire area. It is often considered part of Corstorphine, however it has its own shopping areas, public primary school, parish church and public park.

== History ==
The name "Carrick Knowe" is a semi-tautology, since "Carrick" derives from a Celtic word for a "rock" or "eminence", and "knowe" is the Broad Scots for a "knoll". Like nearby Corstorphine, much of the land is a former bog, and would have been part of the former Corstorphine Loch.

Carrick Knowe was mainly built in 1934/5 as a private for-rent housing estate by builder, Mactaggart & Mickel, the Factor being Gumleys. The architect was Stewart Kaye. The houses were built as four-in-the-block flatted villas. Most of these houses are now privately owned. Property being sold in the area is frequently described as being in Corstorphine, this trading on the higher average house price in Corstorphine postcodes than in Carrick Knowe given differences in quality of accommodation.

The church hall of Carrick Knowe Parish Church on Saughton Road North (Church of Scotland) opened in November 1937 but construction of the church was delayed due to World War II. Building began in 1950 and was completed in 1953. The church was the first post-war stone-built church in Scotland and has had only three ministers in its first seventy years.

== Facilities ==
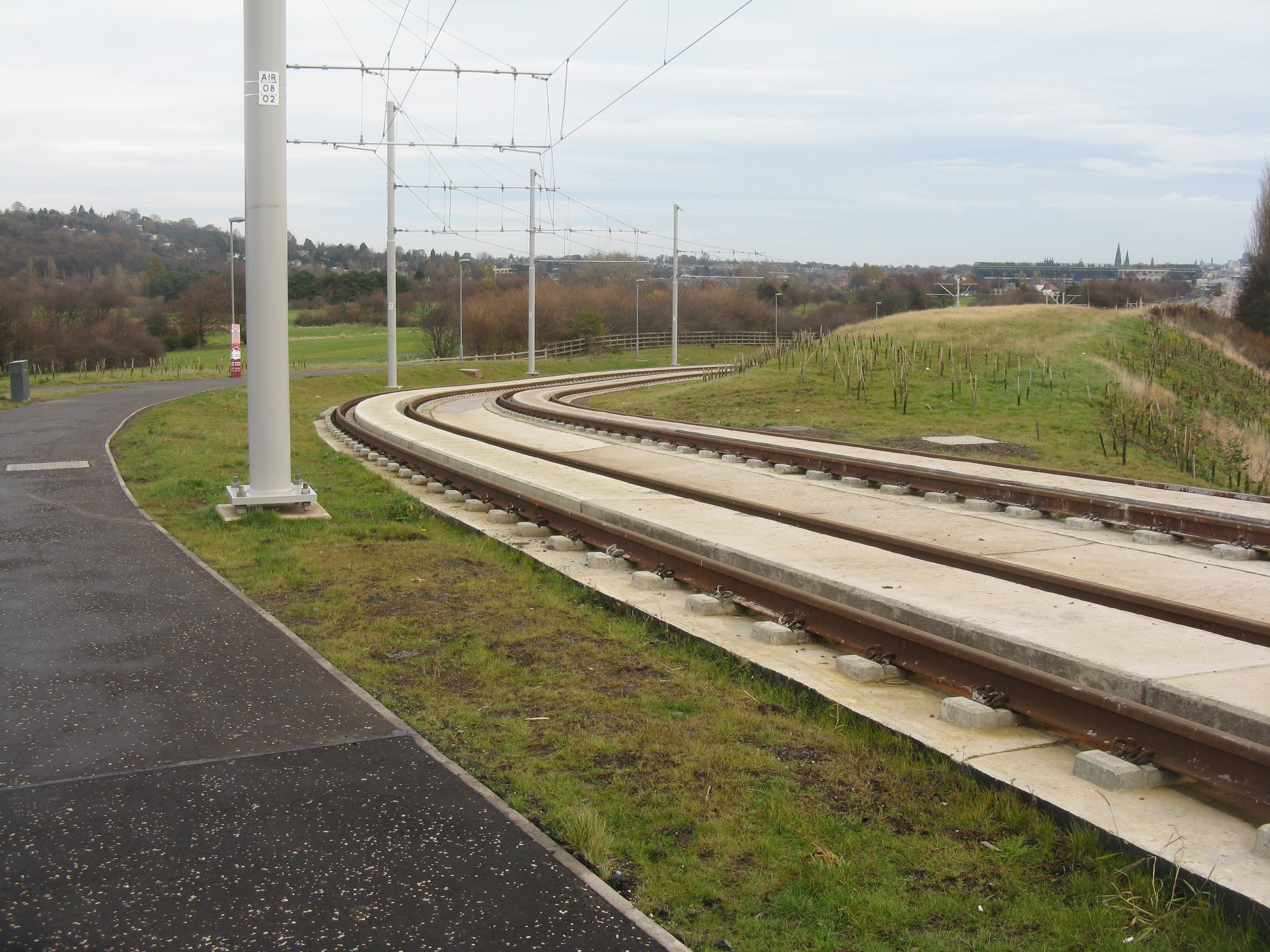
Edinburgh tramway at Carrick Knowe, with Carrick Knowe golf course to the left

Carrick Knowe also has its own municipal golf course. There are two golf clubs that play over the course, Carrick Knowe Golf Club and Carrickvale Golf Club.

The local shops for Carrick Knowe are located on Saughton Road North at two points; on the west side of the road between Broomfield Crescent and Broomhall Avenue, and on both sides of the road just north of Union Park. The shops on the east side as of 2025 include The Terrace Pub, Wok Ninja's Chinese, Dianne Ward Hairdressing, William Hill and Scotmid (formerly Spar).Opposite these shops there is Corstorphine Gas Services, McCarthur’s Bakery, The Piano Shop and Footcare.

Shops opposite ((Union Park)) as of 2025 include Wash My Dugg, The Carrick Knowe Post Office/Premier, Carrick Knowe Pharmacy, Khal’s Licensed Grocers, We Pay (Clothing Buyer), Ferry Good Food, Ross’ Barbers and Time Hair Salon.

Corstorphine Library is close to Carrick Knowe.

Edinburgh Trams serves Carrick Knowe at the Saughton tram stop.

== Sports ==
Corstorphine RFC hold their home games at Union Park.
