= New Finnish Grammar =

2000 novel by Diego Marani

- Author: Diego Marani
- Original title: Nuova grammatica finlandese
- Translator: Judith Landry
- Language: Italian
- Publisher: Bompiani
- Publication date: 2000
- Publication place: Italy
- English publication date: 2011
- Pages: 205
- ISBN: 9788845244391

New Finnish Grammar (Italian: Nuova grammatica finlandese) is a 2000 novel by the Italian writer Diego Marani. It was translated from the Italian by Judith Landry and published by Dedalus Books in 2011. In Italy, the book won the Grinzane Cavour Prize in 2001. The English edition was shortlisted for the 2012 Independent Foreign Fiction Prize and the 2012 Best Translated Book Award.

The plot begins in 1943 Trieste, Italy, where a military doctor, originally from Finland but enlisted in a German hospital ship, finds an unidentified man who is seriously wounded. The man recovers from his wound but seems to have lost his memory and even his language. The doctor believes the man to be a Finnish sailor who has somehow ended up in Italy, like himself. The doctor attempts to reconstruct the man's identity, to teach him Finnish, and eventually arranges his return to Helsinki to find his past.

== See also ==
- 2000 in literature
- Italian literature
