= Colin McWilliam =

British architecture academic

Colin McWilliam (19 February 1928 – 8 December 1989) was a British architecture academic and author.

== Career ==
Born in London, McWilliam was educated at Charterhouse School and studied architecture at Gonville and Caius College, Cambridge. Upon graduation, he enrolled at the British School in Rome, returning to Scotland in 1951 to work with architect Stewart Kaye and with the National Building Record. Over subsequent years he became Director of the Scottish National Buildings Record, then the Assistant Secretary of the National Trust for Scotland. He also directed architectural history and conservation at Edinburgh College of Art, and later Heriot-Watt University.

McWilliam was a founder of the Dictionary of Scottish Architects Project, and was instrumental in setting up the Architectural Heritage Society of Scotland. From 1965 to 1972 he was a Council member of the influential Edinburgh conservationist group the Cockburn Association.

In the 1970s, McWilliam was approached by Sir Nikolaus Pevsner who, having completed the series The Buildings of England, was keen to extend the project to cover the rest of the UK. McWilliam went on to co-write two volumes in The Buildings of Scotland series and became the project's editor.

He designed a desk and a bookcase incorporating copies of a portrait medallion of Robert Adam by James Tassie, for the Cabinet Room in Bute House, the official residence of the First Minister of Scotland.

Colin McWilliam is commemorated on a plaque in Greyfriars Kirkyard in Edinburgh. He was the father of the author Candia McWilliam.

== Publications ==
- Culross: A Short Guide to the Royal Burgh (1962)
- Scottish Townscape (1975)
- Lothian, except Edinburgh. Buildings of Scotland (1978)
- Edinburgh. Buildings of Scotland. (1984) (with David Walker and John Gifford)
