= Alessandro Perissinotto =

Italian writer, translator and university professor

Alessandro Perissinotto (born 1964 in Turin) is an Italian writer, translator and university professor.

== Biography ==
After a number of jobs which helped funded his studies he graduated in 1992 in Italian Literature with a dissertation on semiotics and starts his research in multimedia, teaching instruments, the language of signs in fairytales, with Gli Attrezzi del Narratore. He publishes Il Dizionario Della Fiaba (Dictionary of the Fairytale) with Gian Paolo Caprettini.

He currently teaches at the University of Turin, having taught in Bergamo for a few years.

He plays football in the Osvaldo Soriano Football Club, the Italian writers' national team.

== Writing ==
In 1997, Perissinotto started to publish crime fiction books.

The first novel is L'anno che uccisero Rosetta, set in the 1960s in Cantoira, a small village in the Valli di Lanzo (Piedmont), followed shortly afterwards by La canzone di Colombano set in Val di Susa, in Chiomonte, at the beginning of the 16th century. Then he publishes Treno 8017, inspired by the Balvano train disaster in 1944 when more than 500 people died, and in 2004 Al mio Giudice, an epistolary novel where the letters between someone accused of murder and the judge searching for him are exchanged by email. The two latter books are set in modern times, and in the environment of financiers dealing with dangerous online speculations. Al mio Giudice won the Premio Grinzane Cavour (2005) for Italian fiction.

In the following three novels Una piccola storia ignobile, L'ultima notte bianca and L'orchestra del Titanic, all published by Rizzoli, the investigation is carried out by the same character, the psychologist Anna Pavesi, who uses her knowledge of the mind to find the banality of evil which is present in all people; in particular, the investigation in L'ultima notte bianca, during the Olympics in Turin shows the existence of a city periphery inhabited by hardworking people but excluded from the main celebrations, and most of all by a large number of young people who live in extreme poverty and eek a living from drugs and prostitution.

=== Main works ===
- Al mio giudice (winner of Grinzane Cavour Prize in 2005 and Chianti Literary Prize in 2006), (2005)
- Per vendetta, Rizzoli (2009)
- Semina il vento, Piemme (2011)
- Lo sguardo oltre l'orizzonte, Banca del Piemonte Editore (2011)
- Le colpe dei padri, Piemme (2013)
- Coordinate d'oriente, Piemme (2014)
- Il treno per Tallinn, Mondadori, 2016
- Quello che l'acqua nasconde, Piemme (2017)
- La neve sotto la neve, Mondadori, 2017
- Parigi lato ferrovia, Contromano, Laterza, 2018
- Il silenzio della collina, Mondadori, 2019
- La guerra dei Traversa, Milano, Mondadori, 2024

=== Historical crime fiction ===
- L'anno che uccisero Rosetta, Sellerio editore, (1997)
- La Canzone di Colombano, Sellerio editore, (Premio Fedeli, 2001), (2000)
- Treno 8017, Sellerio editore, (2003)

=== Anna Pavesi's trilogy ===
1. Una piccola storia ignobile, Rizzoli (Premio Camaiore di Letteratura Gialla, 2006), (2006) (English translation Blood Sisters, tr. Howard Curtis, Hersilia Press, 2011)
2. L'ultima notte bianca, Rizzoli, (2007)
3. L'orchestra dei Titanic, Rizzoli, (2008)

=== Non fiction ===
- Il testo multimediale, Utet Libreria (2000)
- Metamorfosi della rete, Bergamo University Press (2001)
- Come creare corsi on line, Carocci, (with Barbara Bruschi) (2003)
- Gli attrezzi del narratore, Rizzoli (2005)
- La società dell'indagine, Bompiani (2008)

== Awards ==
"Al mio giudice" Rizzoli 2004 Premio Letterario Chianti 2005 Premio Letterario Chianti 2005/2006 · 19ª EDIZIONE
