= University of Bergamo =

Italian university

- Università degli studi di Bergamo
- Other name: UniBG
- Type: State-supported
- Established: 1968
- Rector: Sergio Cavalieri
- Administrative staff: 224
- Students: 16,565
- Location: Bergamo; Dalmine, Italy; 45.7045°N 9.6607°E
- Campus: Urban
- Website: www.unibg.it

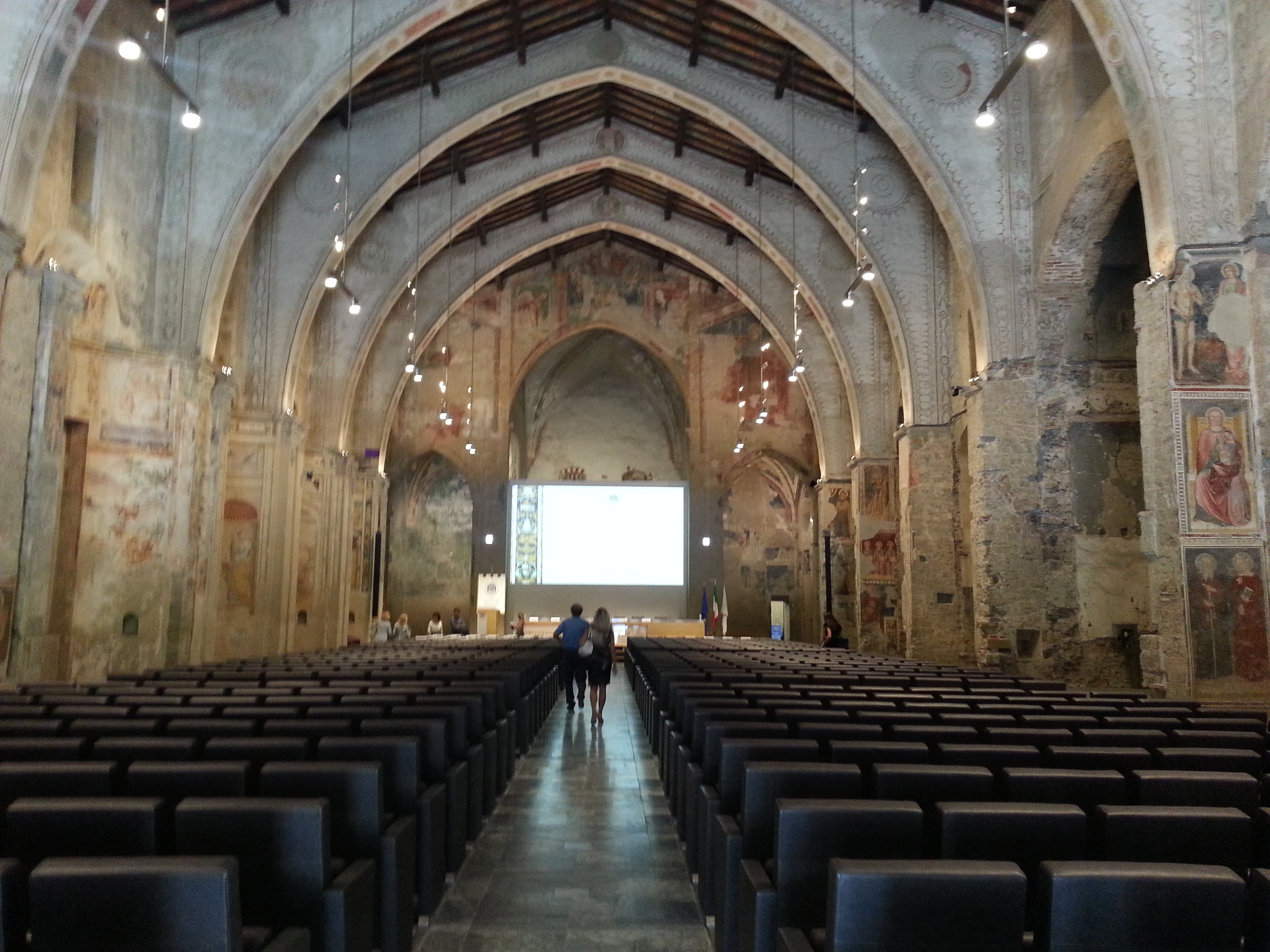
Great Hall of the University of Bergamo, in the former Saint Augustine's Church of the homonymous former monastery where, according to Luigi Tadini, a young Martin Luther (then an Augustinian friar) celebrated his first mass when he was hosted at the monastic complex during his journey to Rome in 1510.

The University of Bergamo (Italian: Università degli studi di Bergamo; acronym: UniBG) is an Italian public university located in Bergamo, Italy. It was founded on 11 December 1968 and is organized in seven departments, three campuses, and forty-one degree courses.

== History ==
The University of Bergamo, founded in 1968, was originally named the "Institute of Foreign Languages and Literature". Under Rector Serio Galeotti (1972–75), the degree course in economics and business was introduced (1974), finally becoming a Faculty in 1988.

During the rectorship of Giorgio Szëgo, characterized by the new Faculty of Economics, the university continued to expand, but it was the Rector Pietro Enrico Ferri in 1990 who opened the Faculty of Engineering in Dalmine and accompanied the transfer of the private institute to the State under the new name "University of the studies of Bergamo".

Over the years the university has played an important role in restoring some of the historic buildings in the Upper City of Bergamo: the Faculty of Foreign Languages started off in the former palace of the Venetian Governor in Piazza Vecchia; Economics was in the former Capuchin monastery in Piazza Rosate; Human Sciences, Arts and Philosophy are in the former Augustinian monastery in front of the Fara park, and in the nearby former Collegio Baroni; while the Rector's seat is still in the former Terzi Palace of Saint Agatha in Via Salvecchio.

The university has steadily expanded, and in the last few years under the guidance of the rector, Stefano Paleari, the growth has been remarkable. With the recent additions of Arts and Philosophy and Law, the departments are now six; there are seventeen degree courses – three in Languages, three in Arts and Philosophy, four in Economics, one in Law, five in Engineering and one in the Science of Economic and Financial Security in collaboration with the "Academy of the Guardia di Finanza" (a higher education college for the training of Italian Economic/Financial Police ― the Guardia di Finanza is an Italian police force directly under the authority of the Ministry of Economy and Finance, is an integral part of the Italian armed forces as well as of the law enforcement agencies).

Together with eight postgraduate diplomas, there are also new courses in law, pedagogy and tourism. Enrollments, constantly on the increase, have passed from 7 thousand (academic year 1999/2000) to more than 15 thousand (academic year 2013/2014); as new courses and teaching facilities increase, so do the enrolments.

In 2001 the Faculty of Economics moved from the Upper City to the Lower City in Via dei Caniana, while the former Monastery of Saint Augustin and Collegio Baroni were reopened as the new centre for the Faculty of Human Sciences, Arts, and Philosophy, so that the university now occupies an area of 40,000 m^{2}. In 2004, it established a satellite campus in Treviglio, the first five students of which graduated in 2007.

The University of Bergamo is the administrative seat for six research doctorates and can boast important initiatives such as the International Seminar of the Russian Language, the Course on Italian Language and Literature for Foreigners, the Centre of Anthropology, the Observatory on Bank Mergers, and the Centre for Territorial Studies.

There is an original and fruitful relationship between the university and the business activities of the province of Bergamo. Various firms have contributed to the financing of the association Pro Universitate Bergomensi, which supports the university in its initiatives. As a result, certain degree courses in textile engineering and laboratories and research projects in various fields have been financed.

== Certified quality ==
According to Censis' ranking on the educational offer of Italian universities, the University of Bergamo presents some of the best courses in Italy. This ranking takes into account the teaching offer of Italian bachelor's and master's degree in specific subjects and is based on the career progression and institutional relations for the 2018/2019 academic year, placing the University of Bergamo among the top performers in five teaching groups.

The quality of the University of Bergamo is not only recognized at national level. Times Higher Education has in fact ranked the university among the top 500 universities in the world and among the top 100 young universities in the world.

== Organization ==
The university is divided into seven departments, some of which provide English-taught degrees:

- Department of Arts and Philosophy
- Department of Economics and Business Administration
  - Economics (Bsc)
  - Business Economics (BA)
  - Accounting, Accountability and Governance (MSc)
  - Management, Finance and International Business (MSc)
  - Business Administration and Financial Accounting (MSc)
  - Economics and Data Analysis (Msc)
- Department of Engineering
  - Management Engineering (M.Eng)
  - Smart Technology Engineering (M.Eng.)
  - Engineering and Management for Health (M.Eng)
- Department of Foreign Languages, Literature and Communication
  - Planning and Management of Tourism Systems (MSc)
- Department of Law
- Department of Human and Social Sciences
  - Clinical Psychology for Individuals, Families and Organizations (MSc)

== Campuses ==
The University of Bergamo has seven departments, scattered throughout the city of Bergamo and Dalmine:

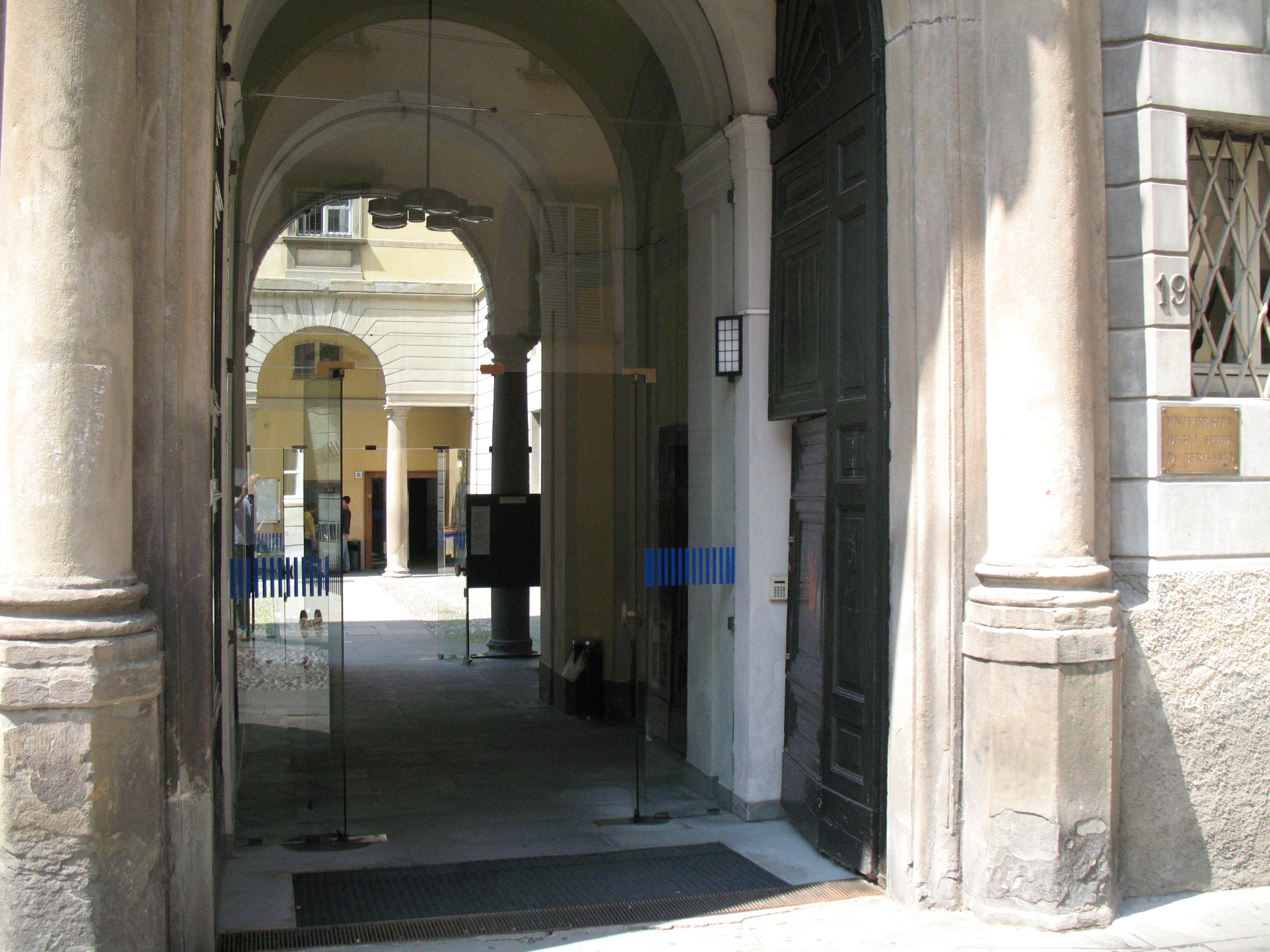
Main entrance to the Salvecchio Campus, to the Rector's Office and to the Department of Foreign Languages, Literature and Communication

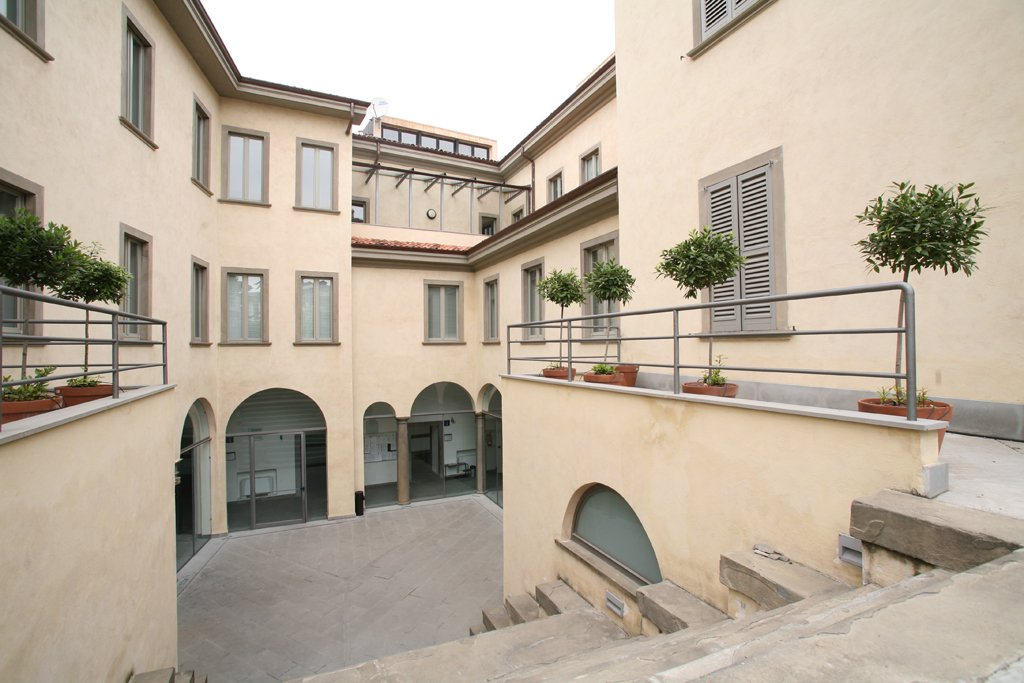
Rosate Campus, in a former Capuchin monastery

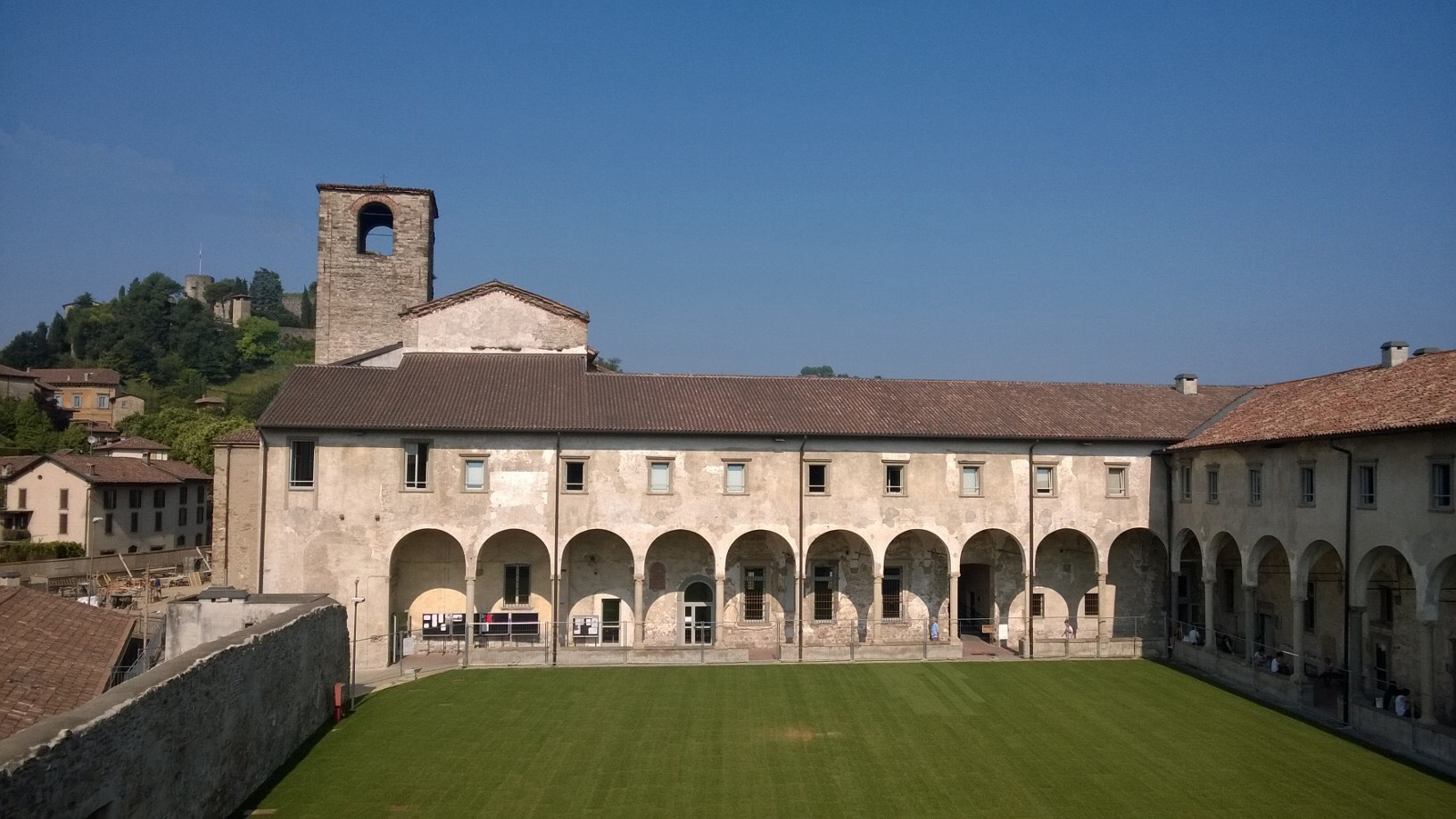
Cloister of the former Monastery of Saint Augustine, now Saint Augustine Campus, Department of Human and Social Sciences

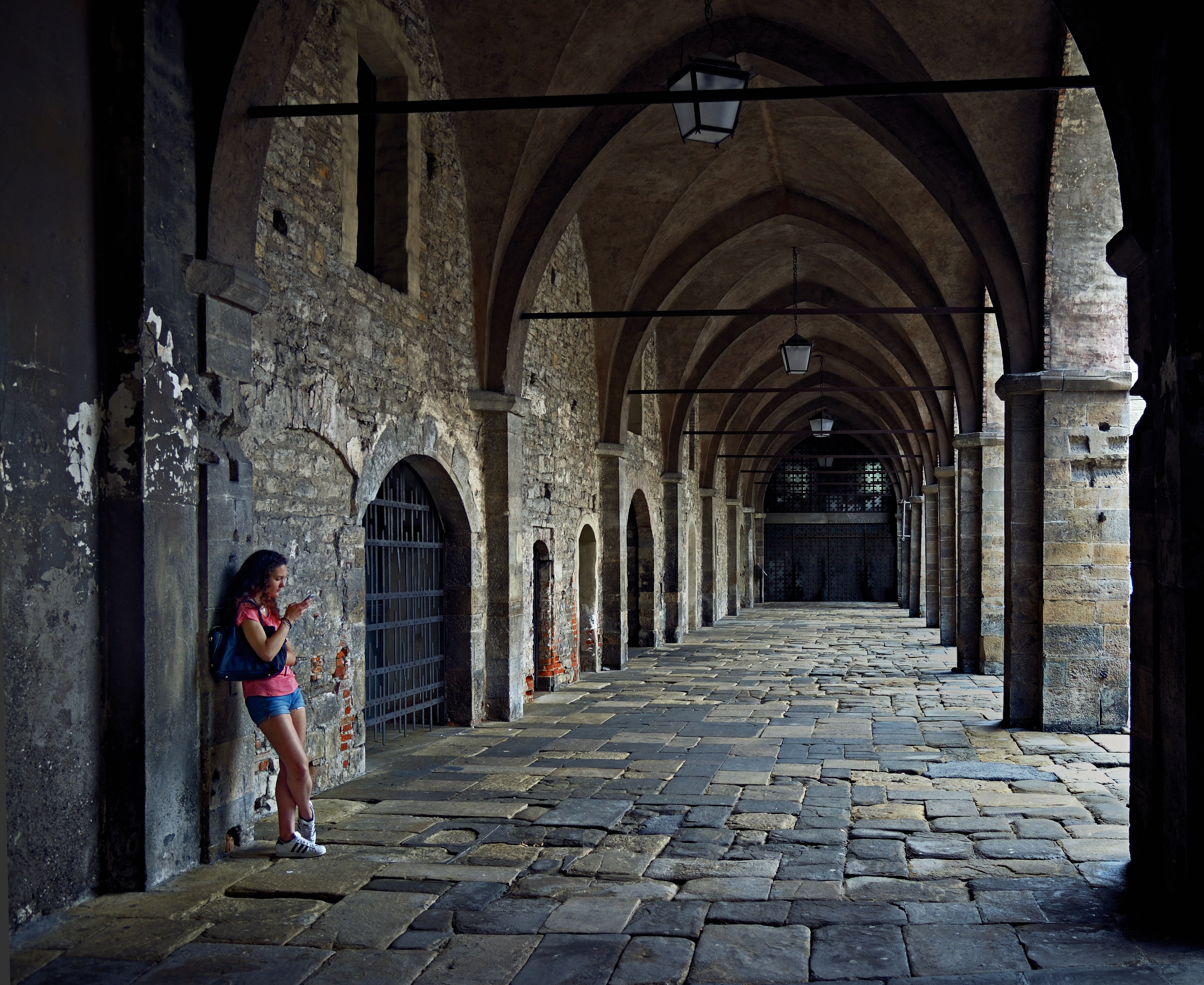
Cloister of the University of Bergamo

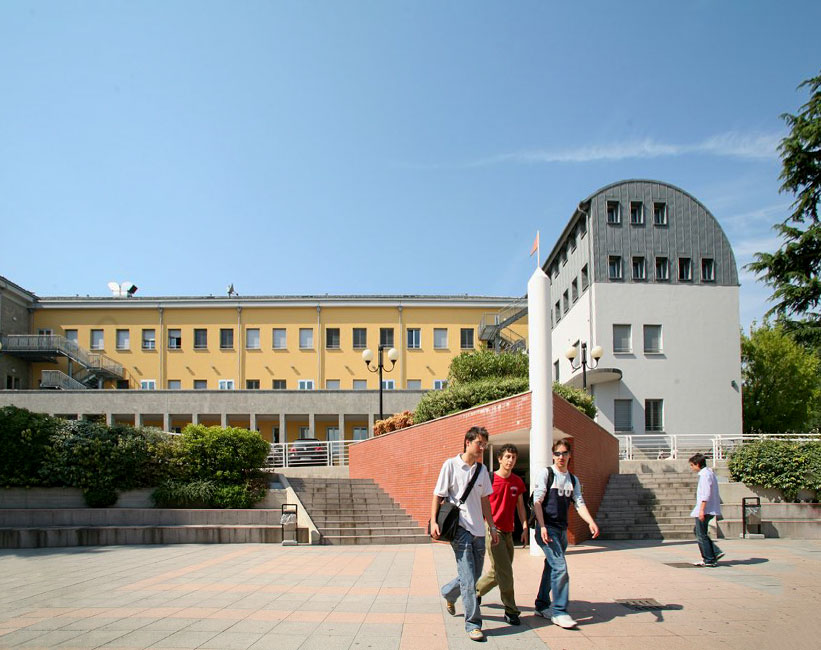
Building B of the Dalmine Campus, Department of Engineering in Dalmine

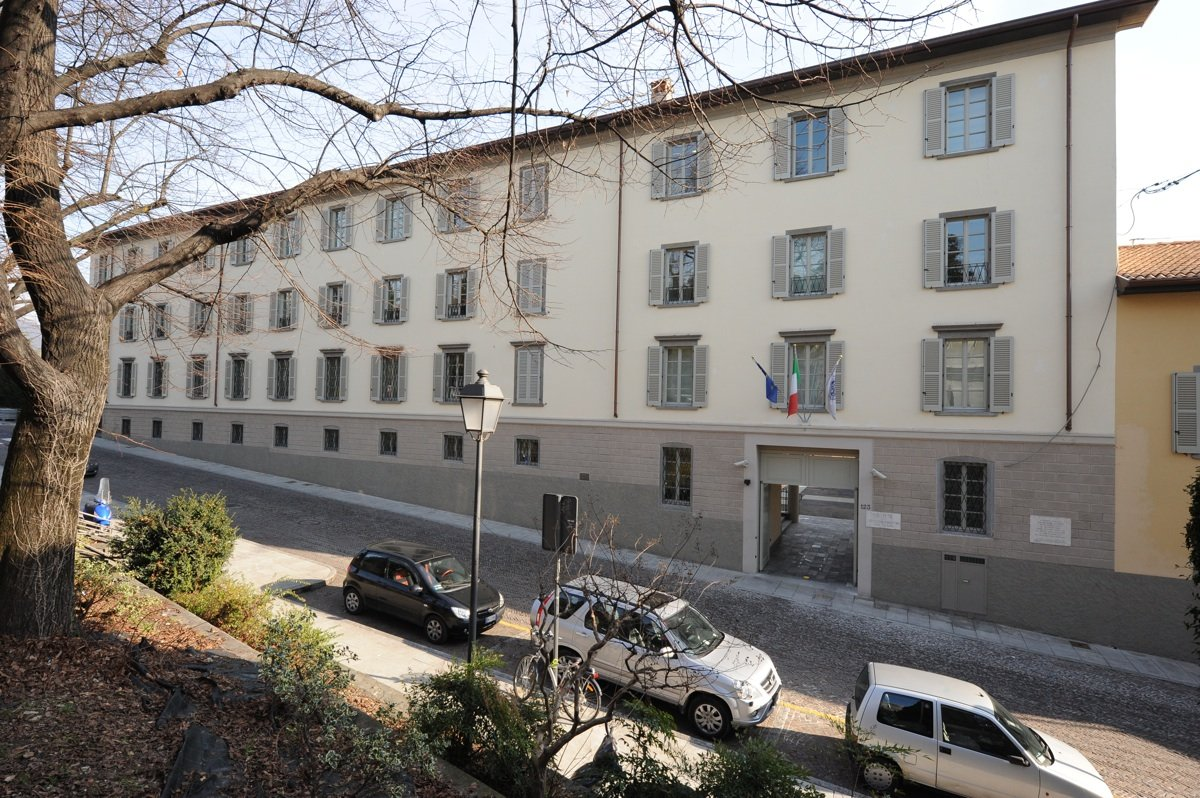
Former Collegio Baroni, now Baroni or Pignolo Campus, Department of Arts and Philosophy

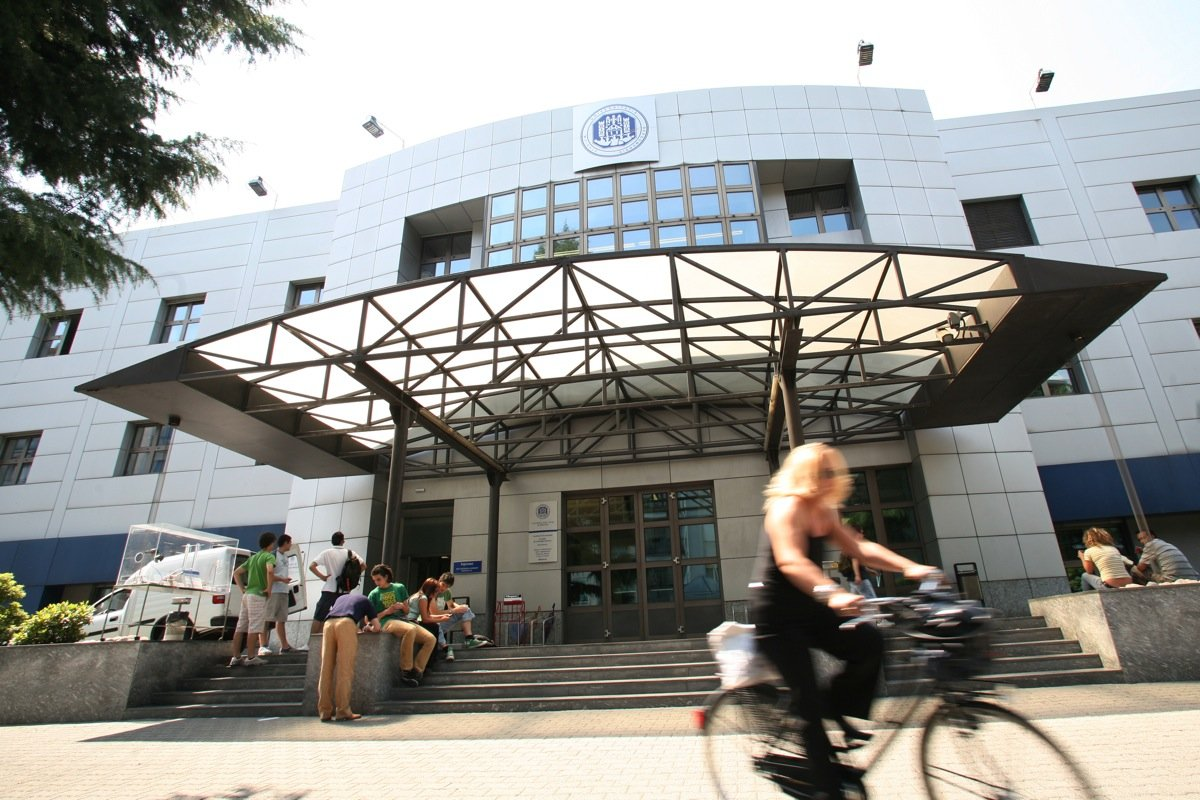
Caniana Campus, Department of Economics and Business Administration, and Law

== Notable people ==
- Jean Tirole (b. 1953), French professor of economics, honoris causa
- Joseph Stiglitz (b. 1943), American economist, honoris causa
- Liliana Segre (b. 1930), Holocaust survivor, Senator for life, honoris causa
- Franco Modigliani (1918-2003), Italian-American economist and recipient of the Nobel Prize in Economics in 1985, honoris causa
- Fabio Vittorini (b. 1971), Italian literary critic, PhD
- Emanuela Casti (b. 1950), Italian geographer and a cartographer theorist, faculty
- Gianluca Bocchi (b. 1954), Italian philosopher, faculty
- Renata Mansini (b. 1968), Italian applied mathematician, economist and operations researcher, PhD
- Paolo Cesaretti (b. 1957), Italian historian, faculty
- Antonio Scurati (b. 1969), Italian writer and academic, PhD
- Daniele Antonio Di Pietro (b. 1979), Italian-French mathematician, director of Institut Montpelliérain Alexander Grothendieck

== See also ==
- List of Italian universities
- Bergamo
