= Natasha Radojčić-Kane =

American writer of Serbian descent

Natasha Radojčić-Kane (Serbian Cyrillic: Наташа Радојчић Кејн; born in Belgrade, Serbia, Yugoslavia) is an American writer of Serbian descent.

She graduated from Columbia University where she earned an MFA in fiction. She is the author of two novels, Homecoming and You Don't Have to Live Here. She has also written several plays and screenplays. She is a co-founder of the literary journal H.O.W. Journal. Radojčić-Kane lives in New York City.

== Works ==
- Homecoming (2002)
- You Don't Have to Live Here (2005)
