= Debatable Land =

1995 novel by Candia McWilliam

- Author: Candia McWilliam
- Publisher: Picador
- Publication date: July 7, 1995
- ISBN: 978-0-330-33662-8

Debatable Land is a 1995 novel by Scottish author Candia McWilliam. It seeks to raise questions about the direction in which Britain (and more specifically the devolution project) is moving in the 21st century. The title refers to the debatable lands – land lying between Scotland and England when they were distinct kingdoms – which perennially switched between English and Scots rule, before becoming an independent lawless territory ruled by warring clans.

The novel is set on a boat on the beautifully evoked South Pacific, and the relations between the characters mirror contemporary devolutionary debates between the constitutive British states, particularly the relationship between England and Scotland.

Debatable Land won the 1994 Guardian First Book Award.
