= Morselli =

Morselli is an Italian surname. As of 2013, in Italy there are approximately 1,200 people with the surname Morselli, around half of whom reside in Emilia-Romagna.

== Notable people ==
Notable people with this surname include:

- Guido Morselli (1912–1973), Italian author
- Henry Morselli, Italian physician
- Joe Morselli (1944–2006), Canadian businessman
