= Francesco Leonetti =

Italian writer and poet (1924–2017)

- Born: 27 January 1924; Cosenza, Italy
- Died: 17 December 2017 (aged 93); Milan, Italy
- Occupations: Poet, novelist, teacher, political activist

Francesco Leonetti (27 January 1924 – 17 December 2017) was an Italian poet, novelist, art critic, teacher and political activist.

== Education and career ==
Leonetti was born in Cosenza in Calabria. In 1955 he moved to Bologna to study philosophy. There he met Pier Paolo Pasolini and Roberto Roversi, and together they co-founded the magazine Officina.

In the 1960s he co-founded with Elio Vittorini and Italo Calvino the literary magazine Il Menabò. In 1963 he joined the Neoavanguardia avant-garde Italian literary movement.

== Works ==
Leonetti collaborated with Pasolini again in 1964, playing the part of Herod Antipas in The Gospel According to St. Matthew. He also provided the voice of the sparrow in The Hawks and the Sparrows (1966) and played the part of the servant Laio in the 1967 film Oedipus Rex.

In the 1970s he co-edited with Nanni Balestrini the magazine Alfabeta. In 1974 he authored a monograph on Italian sculptor Arnaldo Pomodoro. From 1975 to 1995 he taught Aesthetics at the Brera Academy in Milan.

He worked for 25 years in the field of e-learning.

== Selected works ==
- Sopra una perduta estate (1942)
- La cantica (1959)
- L’incompleto (1964)
- Irati e sereni (1974)
- Conoscenza per errore (studente a Bologna del 48–49) (1978)
- In uno scacco (1979)
- Campo di battaglia (1981)
- Palla di filo (1986)
- La vita e gli amici (1992)
- La voce del corvo. Una vita (1940–2001) (2002)
- Scritti estremi di rabbia e di gioco. Narrazione, poesie, scene e prose (2005)
- Una come un'altra (2015)

== Filmography ==
Year	Title	Role	Notes
1964	The Gospel According to St. Matthew	Erode II	
1966	The Hawks and the Sparrows	Crow	Voice, Uncredited
1967	Oedipus Rex	Servo di Laio	
1968	Caprice Italian Style	Il Burattinaio	(segment "Che cosa sono le nuvole?")
1969	The Year of the Cannibals	Prime Minister	
1972	The Canterbury Tales	voice of the Tabard inn host	
1997	The Vesuvians	Corvo	(segment "La salita"), Voice, (final film role)
