= Michael Krüger (writer) =

German writer, publisher and translator (born 1943)

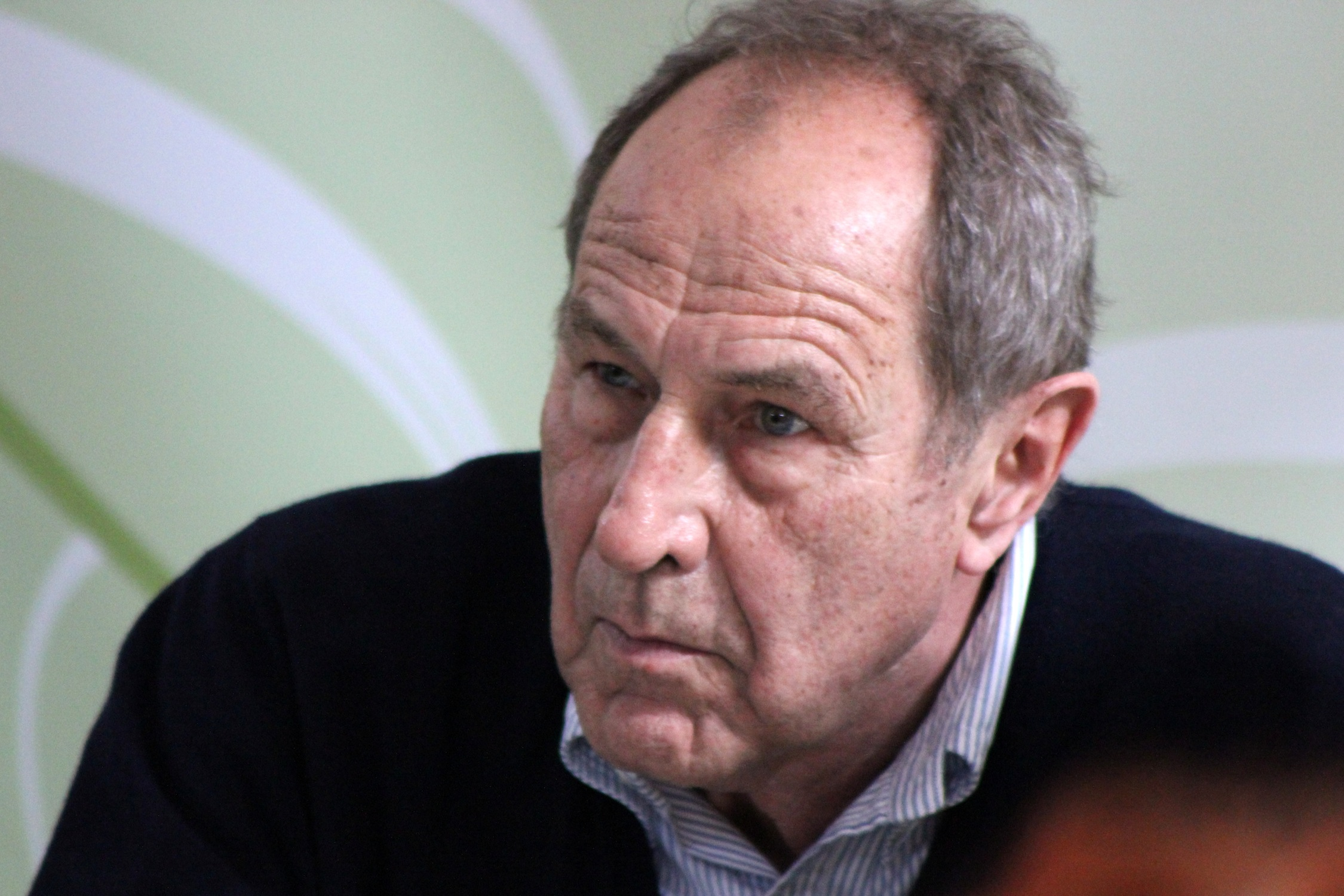
Michael Krüger at the Leipzig Book Fair

Michael Krüger (born 9 December 1943) is a German writer, publisher and translator.

== Early life and education ==
Michael Krüger was born in 1943 in Wittgendorf, Saxony, Germany. He grew up in Berlin.

After completing secondary schooling, he was apprenticed to a publisher and later studied philosophy and literature.

== Career ==
From 1962 to 1965 Krüger worked as a bookseller in London.

From 1968 he worked as an editor at the publishing house Carl Hanser Verlag, becoming director in 1986. He was also head of fiction publishing.

In 1972 he published his first poems, with his first collection, Reginapoly, appearing in 1976 and his first collection of stories Was tun: Eine altmodische Geschichte (What shall we do: An old-fashioned story) in 1984. Several stories, novels and translations followed.

== Recognition and awards ==
Krüger's work has garnered many important accolades, including the 1986 Toucan Prize and the 1996 Prix Médicis étranger.

== Other activities ==
Krüger wrote the introduction to the 2010 New York Review of Books edition of Jakov Lind's Soul of Wood.

From 1975 he became a jury member of the European literary award Petrarca-Preis.

He is also a juror for the Zbigniew Herbert International Literary Award.

== Works ==
- Krüger, Michael; Drawert, Kurt (2001). Archive des Zweifels : Gedichte aus drei Jahrzehnten (in German). Frankfurt am Main: Suhrkamp. ISBN 3-518-39795-8. OCLC 50474040.
- —— (2003). Kurz vor dem Gewitter : Gedichte (in German). Frankfurt am Main: Suhrkamp. ISBN 3-518-41456-9. OCLC 52911248.
- —— (2007). Die Turiner Komödie Bericht eines Nachlaßverwalters; Roman (in German). ISBN 978-3-518-45876-1. OCLC 180151476.
- —— (2007). Unter freiem Himmel : Gedichte (in German). Frankfurt am Main: Suhrkamp. ISBN 978-3-518-41912-0. OCLC 173071346.
- —— (2008). Reden und Einwürfe : Gedichte (in German). Frankfurt am Main: Insel. ISBN 978-3-458-19309-8. OCLC 262889460.
- —— (2010). Ins Reine : Gedichte (in German). Berlin: Suhrkamp. ISBN 978-3-518-42168-0. OCLC 657596926.
- —— (2013). Umstellung der Zeit : Gedichte (in German). ISBN 978-3-518-42394-3. OCLC 856902497.
- —— (2016). "Hellwach gehe ich schlafen" hundert Gedichte (in German). ISBN 978-3-518-46722-0. OCLC 962180677.
- —— (2017). Das falsche Haus eine Novelle (in German). Berlin: Suhrkamp Verlag. ISBN 978-3-518-24070-0. OCLC 994229551.
- —— (2018). Einmal einfach : Gedichte (in German). ISBN 978-3-518-42798-9. OCLC 1020069897.
- —— (2021). Im Wald, im Holzhaus : Gedichte (in German). ISBN 978-3-518-43005-7. OCLC 1264649566.
- Morselli, Guido; Gschwend, Ragni Maria; —— (2021). Dissipatio humani generis oder Die Einsamkeit Roman (in German). Berlin: Suhrkamp Verlag. ISBN 978-3-518-22529-5. OCLC 1265001212.
- —— (2021). Im Wald, im Holzhaus : Gedichte (in German). ISBN 978-3-518-43005-7. OCLC 1264649566.
- —— (2022). Was in den zwei Wochen nach der Rückkehr aus Paris geschah : eine Erzählung (in German). ISBN 978-3-518-47230-9. OCLC 1304455326.
