= Giacomo Sartori =

Italian writer

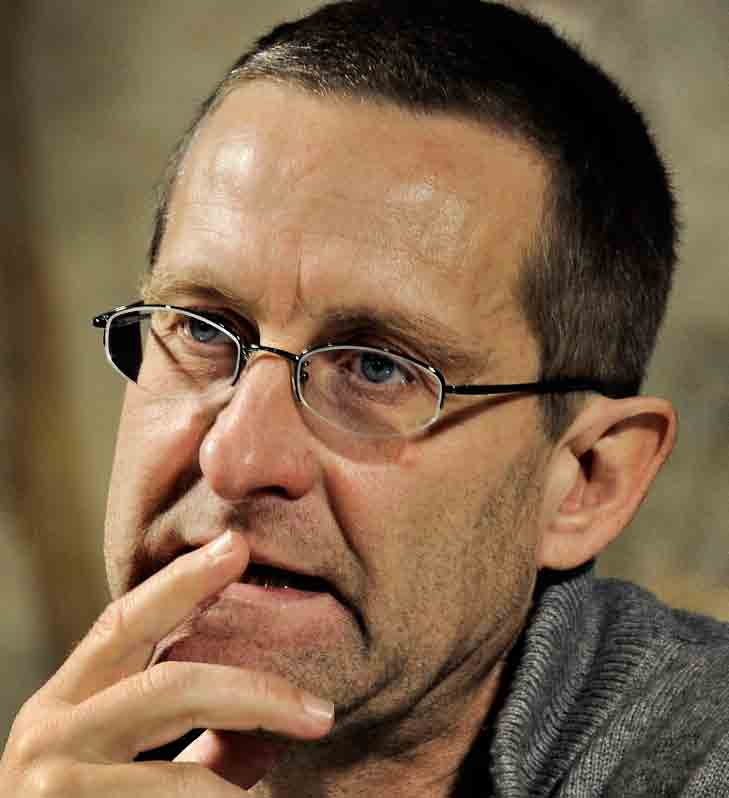
- Sartori in 2010
- Born: 1958 (age 67–68); Trento, Italy
- Occupations: Author, agronomist
- Years active: 1990s – present

Giacomo Sartori (born 1958) is an Italian author and agronomist. His day job as a soil scientist has attracted attention for its atypicality and influence on his work. Sartori, who began writing in his thirties, has since published seven novels and four collections of short stories. He is also an editor and columnist of the online literary magazine Nazione Indiana. I Am God, his first novel to be published in English, was translated in 2019 by Frederika Randall and received positive reviews.

== Early life ==
Sartori was born in Trento, Italy, in 1958. The Alpine region near the Austrian border he grew up in inspired many of his early works. His father was a supporter of Italian fascism and Benito Mussolini, which shaped the younger Sartori's worldview indelibly; his conscious attempts to distance himself from his father inspired much of his psyche and writing. He graduated from the University of Florence in 1983 with a degree in agricultural science.

== Early works ==
Sartori began writing in the 1990s and published his first novel, Tritolo, in 1999. His other early works include Sacrificio (2008), Cielo nero (2008), and Rogo (2015).

In 2005, Sartori published the autofictional The Anatomy of the Battle, based on his relationship with his father and their political conflicts. He described the process of writing it as a "true and proper revelation", coming to terms with aspects of his psyche and lifestyle that he had previously denied. The work was praised in the Italian literary media for its depth and focus. It was partially translated by Frederika Randall before her death, and he hoped to publish it in the United States.

In 2011, he published the short story collection Autismi, a collection of absurdist shorts influenced by psychoanalytic theory. It was awarded the Frontier Grenzen, the pre-eminent literary prize of the Alps.

== Sono Dio ==
In 2016, Sartori published Sono Dio, a novel from the perspective of the omnipotent and omniscient God. It was translated to English by Randall and published as I Am God in 2019.

Sono Dio received positive reviews, including from major publications such as L'Indice dei libri del mese, but overall was little-noticed. However, in translation, I Am God received substantial attention from publications such as The New York Times and The New Republic. It was named one of the top books of the year by the Financial Times and received multiple awards, such as the Foreword INDIES Book of the Year Award and the Italian Prose in Translation Award. Italian commentators discussed the gap in acclaim between Italy and the Anglosphere, ascribing it to Sartori's irreverence being better-received in English and to Randall's dogged perseverance, as well as the connections formed between them by his writing for Nazione Indiana.

== Later works ==
Sartori published Baco, a speculative fiction novel about family and artificial intelligence, in 2019. Baco was well-received and was a finalist for the 2020 Premio Procida Award. Sartori described the work as emblematic of the contrast between "a cynical and inhuman capitalism and those who remain anchored to the values of brotherhood".

== Personal life ==
Sartori lives between Paris and Trento. He has described his unusual day job as a soil scientist as an influence on his writing style. He has also taught agricultural science at the University of Trento.
