= I Am God (disambiguation) =

"I Am God" is an episode of American TV series Veronica Mars.

I Am God, I Am a God or I'm God may refer to:

- I Am God (novel), by Giacomo Sartori
- "I Am a God", a song by Kanye West from his album Yeezus
- "I'm God", an instrumental track by Clams Casino and Imogen Heap
  - "I'm God", a song by Lil B from his album 6 Kiss, which uses the instrumental
- "I Am God", a song by Vital Remains from their album Forever Underground

== See also ==
- Playing God (ethics)
