= The Year of the Cannibals =

1969 Italian film

- Original film poster
- Directed by: Liliana Cavani
- Screenplay by: Italo Moscati; Liliana Cavani
- Story by: Liliana Cavani
- Based on: Antigone by Sophocles
- Produced by: Enzo Doria; Bino Cicogna
- Starring: Pierre Clémenti; Britt Ekland; Tomas Milian; Delia Boccardo; Marino Masé; Francesco Leonetti
- Cinematography: Giulio Albonico
- Edited by: Nino Baragli
- Music by: Ennio Morricone
- Production company: Doria-San Marco Film
- Distributed by: Euro International Films
- Release date: 1969
- Running time: 88 minutes
- Country: Italy
- Language: Italian

The Year of the Cannibals (Italian: I cannibali, lit. 'The Cannibals') is a 1969 Italian drama film directed by Liliana Cavani and starring Britt Ekland, Pierre Clémenti, and Tomas Milian. It is a modernized retelling of the Greek tragedy Antigone, set in contemporary Milan and drawing upon socio-political themes and imagery of the time, including the protests of 1968, the counter-cultural movement, and the Years of Lead.

== Plot ==
The streets of the city are littered with corpses. It is the result of the repression of a protest by the police. A decree of law prohibits the removal of the bodies, under penalty of death, by supreme order of the totalitarian regime. People pass the macabre scene with indifference. Only Antigone wants to bury her brother, but neither her family, nor her fiancé - who is the son of the prime minister - will help her. She finds help from Tiresias, a mysterious stranger who speaks an unknown language. The two dedicate themselves to burying the dead and for this they are arrested and tortured; at first they manage to escape but then they are killed by the police. However, they become a symbol for many young people who, from that moment, begin to collect the corpses of the rebels to bury them.

== Cast ==
- Britt Ekland as Antigone
- Pierre Clémenti as Tiresias
- Tomas Milian as Emone
- Delia Boccardo as Ismene
- Marino Masé as Ismene's Fiancé
- Francesco Leonetti as the Prime Minister
- Alessandro Cane as the Security Minister
- Cora Mazzoni as Antigone’s Mother
- Francesco Arminio as Antigone’s Father
- Giampiero Frondini as Television Speaker

== Release ==
The film premiered on 5 September 1969 at the 30th Venice International Film Festival, in the Informativa sidebar. It was later screened in the Directors' Fortnight section of the 1970 Cannes Film Festival.

A restored version of the film was released on DVD and Blu-ray by Kino Lorber in 2014.

In 2025, a 4K restoration conducted by Cinegrell is presented at the Locarno Film Festival. The film wins the Heritage Restoration Contest as part of Locarno Heritage.

== Soundtrack ==
A complete limited edition of the soundtrack has been released on vinyl by Spikerot Records in 2019.
