= Ippolito Nievo =

Italian writer and activist (1831–1861)

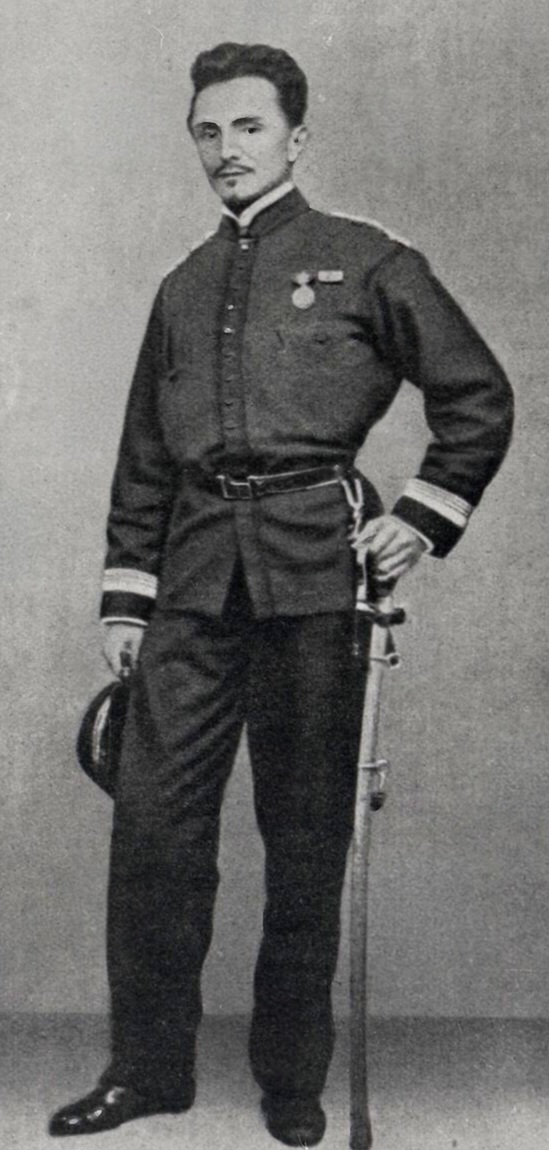
- Ippolito Nievo in 1860
- Born: 30 November 1831; Padua, Kingdom of Lombardy–Venetia
- Died: 4 March 1861 (aged 29); Tyrrhenian Sea
- Cause of death: Shipwrecking
- Education: University of Padua
- Occupations: Poet; Intellectual; Novelist
- Writing career
- Language: Italian
- Period: 19th century
- Genres: Novel; pamphlet; poetry
- Notable work: Confessions of an Italian (1867)

Ippolito Nievo (Italian pronunciation: [ipˈpɔːlito ˈnjɛːvo; ˈnjeː-]; 30 November 1831 – 4 March 1861) was an Italian writer, journalist and patriot. His Confessions of an Italian is widely considered the most important novel about the Italian Risorgimento.

== Life ==
=== Early life and education ===
Nievo was born and raised in Padua, during the time the Veneto region was ruled by the Austrian Empire. His father was a magistrate. He spent his childhood between Mantua and the Friuli, where his family owned the castle of Colloredo di Monte Albano, his life there later providing the material for the earlier chapters of the Confessions of an Italian. As a teenager he took an active part in the 1848 revolution in Mantua, and then continued with anti-Austrian subversion as a law student at the University of Padua. Upon graduating, he refused to join his father's profession as it would imply submission to the Austrian.

=== The Second Italian War of Independence ===
In 1857 he was forced to flee to Milan, where he wrote for various reviews and platonically fell in love with his cousin Bice. He was politically inspired by Giuseppe Mazzini's thought and wanted to join the struggle for the independence of Veneto and a united Italy. In 1860 he fought with Giuseppe Garibaldi's Expedition of the Thousand, who, after having defeated the Bourbon army in Sicily and Southern Italy, gave those regions to the King of Sardinia Victor Emmanuel II.

=== Shipwreck and death ===
When the Thousand left Sicily, Nievo was left at Palermo to look after details of the administration. This duty finished, he made a rapid trip to northern Italy to try to find, in vain, a publisher for his book. On 18 February 1861, in fulfilment of Nievo's hopes, Italy was unified under the House of Savoy. In the same period, while he was at Naples with the duties of chief of the administration of the Southern Army, he received orders to go once more to Palermo.

By the end of February everything at Palermo was completed, and Nievo was eager to return. He departed from Sicily on 4 March 1861, boarding the steamboat Ercole. There were about eighty persons on the Ercole and a certain quantity of military stores. What happened on the voyage is not exactly known. Certainly the Ercole was never seen again. According to one account, the ship foundered in a violent gale some twenty miles from Capri. The Ministry of War, on the other hand, said that a fire broke out during the journey. No wreckage and no bodies were ever certainly found.

== Literary work ==
Nievo's short literary career, prosecuted in tandem with his political career, was remarkably prolific and diverse, whilst at the same time underscored by consistent moral and political principles. He began as a poet with two collections of lyrics, Versi (1854 and 1855), modelled on Parini and Giusti, both of whom had emphasised the educative force of poetry. He published further collections of verse, Le lucciole (1858) and Gli amori garibaldini (1860), and two verse tragedies, I Capuani (1857) and Spartaco (1857).

He was nevertheless mainly a prose writer, producing many novelle (collected as Novelliere campagnolo (1956) and three historical novels—Angelo di bontà (1856), set against the background of the decline and fall of the Republic of Venice, Il conte pecoraio (1857), set in contemporary Friuli after 1855, and Le confessioni di un ottuagenario (published posthumously in 1867 and later retitled Confessioni di un italiano) which returns to the setting of Angelo di bontà.

His political writings include Venezia e la libertà d'Italia, published anonymously after the disappointing armistice of Villafranca in 1859, an important Frammento sulla rivoluzione nazionale, and two accounts of the Garibaldi expedition. All this is in addition to journalism, an extensive correspondence, a comedy (Le invasioni moderne, written in 1857), and translations from Heine, Hugo, Lermontov, and Greek popular poetry. In Studii sulla poesia popolare e civile massimamente in Italia (1854) Nievo lays down the distinctively post-Romantic premises of his subsequent fiction, demanding that the writer should be socially and politically engaged, and alert to developments in other European literatures and cultures. At the same time he asserts the decisive role of the lower classes in the construction of a new national identity, and recognizes the importance of dialects and dialect culture.

His novelle are based partly on his personal experiences and emphasize the harshness of peasant life, contrasting it with bourgeois ease and problematizing the issue of the contribution of the peasantry to the formation of the new Italian state. His clear-eyed realism qualifies the religious element in his writing and distinguishes his work from that of Manzoni, to whom he is in other ways much indebted. Though he is by no means a positivist, in some ways he strongly anticipates the verismo of Verga, particularly in his use of dialect and often irregular Italian.

=== Confessions of an Italian ===
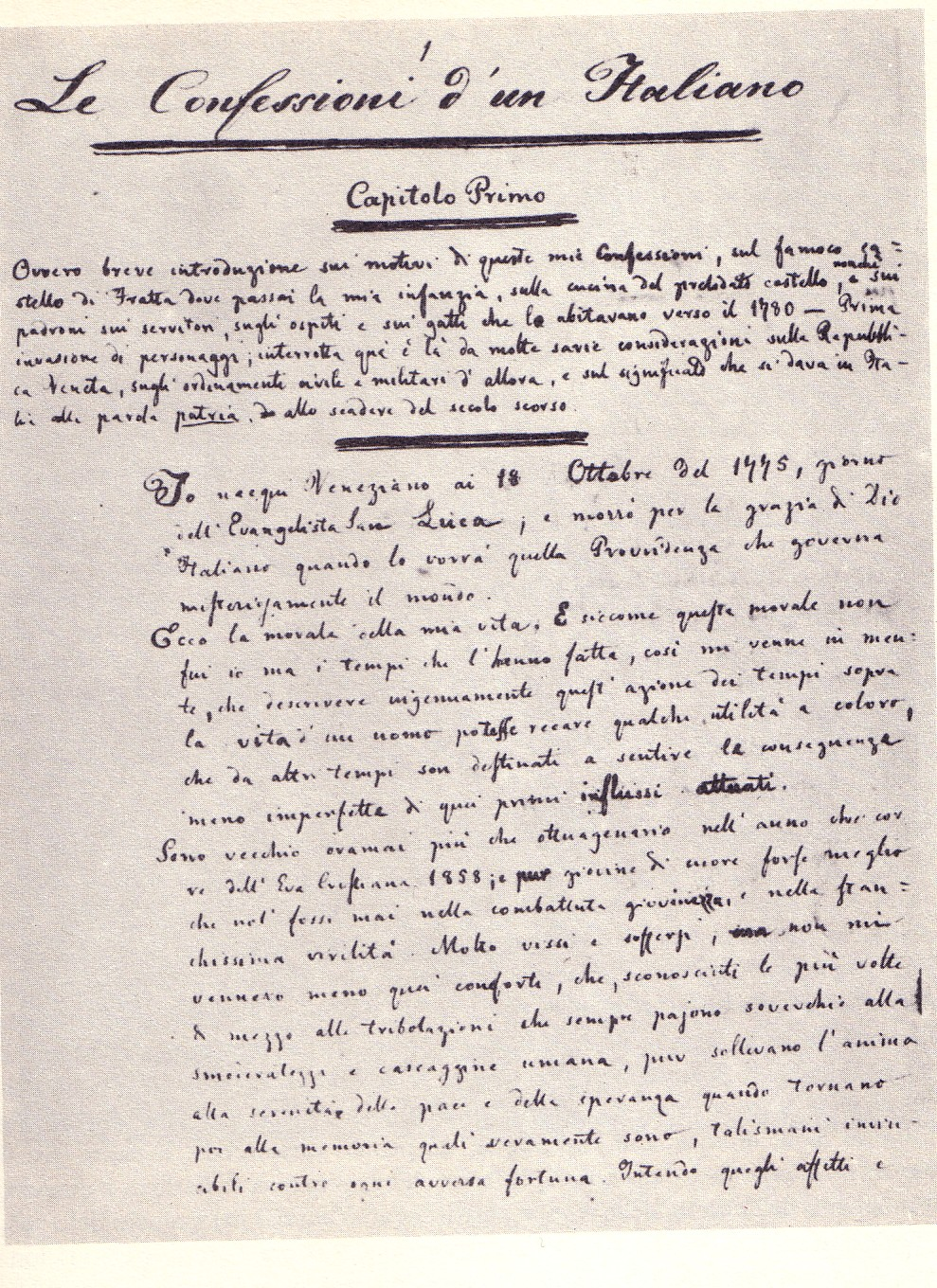
Autograph manuscript of the first page of Nievo's Confessions of an Italian

Nievo is best known for his novel Confessions of an Italian, an abridged English translation of which appeared under the title The Castle of Fratta in 1957, with a full translation by Frederika Randall including an introduction by Lucy Riall later published by Penguin in 2014.

Written between December 1857 and August 1858, the work is in twenty-three chapters. Nievo died before it could receive its final editing. Nievo himself did not find a publisher, and it was only in 1867, six years after the writer's death, that the novel was published under the title Confessioni di un ottuagenario (Confessions of an octogenarian). The author's original title, by which the book is now generally known, was Le Confessioni d'un italiano, but this seemed to be too "political" for the times.

The novel is both historical (its background is events in Italy in the last decades of the 18th century and the first half of the 19th century) and psychological, being based upon the memories of "Carlo Altoviti", the main character and first-person narrator. A poor relation a feudal Venetian family, Carlo Altoviti tells of the castle in which he grew up, of his turbulent love for Pisana, the daughter of a local countess, and of his final peace in maturity.

The chapters dealing with Altoviti's boyhood experience are particularly impressive. Through the character of Carlo Altoviti his own experience and that of his grandfather, a Venetian patrician, Nievo succeeded in recreating a vivid picture of a vanished society. Confessions of an Italian is widely considered the most important novel about the Italian Risorgimento.

== Legacy ==
Ippolito Nievo appears in Umberto Eco's novel The Prague Cemetery. In the novel, the Ercole, the steamboat which Nievo has boarded, is secretly blown up by the fictional protagonist Simonini in order to destroy some important secret documents in Nievo's possession.

An extensive archive of Nievo's correspondence has been preserved, such as 72 letters to the love of his early years Matilde Ferrari. In the last years of his life, Nievo was in love with Caterina Curti Melzi, a noble woman from an ancient Lombard family. Her relative Pier-Ambrogio Curti also was a close friend of Nievo.

The Italian Regia Marina ("Royal Navy") destroyer Ippolito Nievo was named in his honor.

== Sources ==
- Confessions of an Italian. Translated by Frederika Randall. Introduction by Lucy Riall. London: Penguin UK. 2014. ISBN 978-0141391663.
- Iliescu, Nicolae (1960). "The Position of Ippolito Nievo in the Nineteenth-Century Italian Novel". PMLA. 75 (3): 272–282. JSTOR 460338.
- Ferroni, Giulio (1992). Profilo storico della letteratura italiana. Milan: Einaudi scuola.
- Cary, Stephanie Hom (2007). "Patria'-Otic Incarnations and Italian Character: Discourses of Nationalism in Ippolito Nievo's Confessioni d'un Italiano". Italica. 84 (2/3): 214–32. JSTOR 40505696.
- Russo, Emilio (2013). "NIEVO, Ippolito". Dizionario Biografico degli Italiani (in Italian). Vol. 78: Natta–Nurra. Rome: Institute of the Italian Encyclopaedia. ISBN 978-88-12-00032-6.
- Scordo-Polidori, Angela (2014). "Beyond Good and Evil: Pisana and the Birth of the Italian Nation". Italica. 91 (3): 343–66. JSTOR 24368900.
- Zangrandi, Alessandra (2016). Stile e racconto nelle lettere di Ippolito Nievo. Libreria Universitaria. ISBN 978-88-6292-737-6.
- Mengaldo, Pier Vincenzo (2017). "Intorno all'epistolario di Nievo". Universita di Bologna.
