= Frederika Randall =

American-Italian translator and journalist (1948–2020)

- Randall, c. 1986–1987
- Born: 1948; Western Pennsylvania, U.S.
- Died: 12 May 2020 (aged 71–72); Rome, Italy
- Citizenship: United States, Italy
- Occupations: Translator, journalist

Frederika Randall (1948 – 12 May 2020) was an American-Italian translator and journalist. Born in western Pennsylvania, she expatriated to Italy in 1985 at the age of 37. As a journalist, she wrote in both English and Italian for publications such as the New York Times, the Wall Street Journal, and Internazionale; from 2000 until her death, she was the Rome correspondent to The Nation. A prolific translator, her work in that field included Confessions of an Italian, considered one of the most important Italian novels of the 19th century.

== Early life ==
Randall was born in 1948, in a town "downstream from Pittsburgh on the Ohio River". She attended Harvard University, where she graduated with a B.A. in English literature in 1970, and the Massachusetts Institute of Technology, where she attained an M.A. in urban planning working towards a Ph.D., which was left at the all but dissertation level. For a short period, she worked as an urban planner.

== Journalism ==
Randall was the Rome correspondent for The Nation, where she was described as "an acute chronicler of the postwar death spiral of Italian democracy". She was an outspoken critic of Silvio Berlusconi and Matteo Salvini. In addition to her work at The Nation, Randall was a freelance writer for the New York Times, the Wall Street Journal, and Internazionale.

== Translation ==
Randall shifted her focus from journalism to translation in 2002, after she was catastrophically injured jumping from a third-story balcony; her ability to work in the journalistic field was impaired by the disabilities she suffered as a result. She was "enormously admired" by her peers in Italian-to-English translation, and translated seminal works such as Confessions of an Italian. Randall's translation of Confessions of an Italian, the book's first unabridged translation into English, was highly praised. She acquired a reputation for successful translations of works previously labelled "untranslatable", such as Deliver Us (Libera nos a Malo) by Luigi Meneghello.

Randall was awarded a PEN/Heim Translation Prize in 2009 and shortlisted for the Italian Prose in Translation Award in 2017. She would later be posthumously awarded the 2020 Italian Prose in Translation Award for I Am God.

== Personal life ==
Randall moved to Rome from the United States in 1985. She identified as a "dispatriate", intentionally distancing herself from her nation of origin. She was married to an Italian national and had one son, Tommaso Jucker, a biologist.

== Notable translations ==
- Dissipatio H.G.: The Vanishing, Guido Morselli, 1977 (English pub. 2020)
- I Am God, Giacomo Sartori, 2016 (English pub. 2019)
- The Communist, Guido Morselli, 1976 (English pub. 2017)
- Confessions of an Italian, Ippolito Nievo, 1867 (English pub. 2014)
- Libera nos a Malo, Luigi Meneghello, 1963 (English pub. 2012)
- Bug, Giacomo Sartori, 2020 (English pub. 2021)
