= Maria Corti =

Italian philologist, literary critic, and novelist

- Born: 7 September 1915; Milan, Italy
- Died: 22 February 2002 (aged 86); Milan, Italy
- Occupations: Literary scholar and novelist

Maria Corti (7 September 1915 – 22 February 2002) was an Italian philologist, literary critic, and novelist. Considered one of the leading literary scholars of post-World War II Italy, she was awarded numerous prizes including the Premio Campiello for the entire body of her work. Her works of fiction were informed by her literary scholarship but also had a distinctly autobiographical vein, particularly her Voci del nord-est (1986) and II canto delle sirene (1989). For most of her career she was based at the University of Pavia where she established the Fondo Manoscritti di Autori Moderni e Contemporanei, an extensive curated archive of material on modern Italian writers.

== Life and career ==
Corti was born in Milan, the only child of Emilio and Celestina (née Goldoni) Corti. Her mother was a pianist who died when Corti was ten years old. After her mother's death, her father, an engineer frequently absent from Milan while working in southern Italy, placed her in a boarding school run by the Sisters of Saint Marcellina. She would remain there for the next five years. After leaving the boarding school she studied at a liceo in Milan, living largely on her own apart from summer holidays spent with her father in Apulia. She then attended the University of Milan where she would eventually complete two laurea degrees. The first was in literature in 1936 with a thesis on medieval Latin supervised by Benvenuto Terracini. The second was in philosophy with a thesis on African Spir supervised by Antonio Banfi.

Corti's early academic career coincided with Italian Fascism and was curtailed by laws which prohibited women from holding university or liceo teaching positions. From 1939 to 1950 she worked as a teacher in a ginnasio (secondary school for students from age 11 to 16) in Brescia, dedicated herself to private study and writing, and was active in anti-Fascist circles. From 1950 until 1962 she taught at the Alessandro Volta liceo in Como and then at the Cesare Beccaria liceo in Milan. She also held a part-time teaching post at the University of Pavia from 1955 which she combined with her teaching at the liceo in Milan. After her mentor Benvenuto Terracini had returned from exile in 1947, she renewed her research collaboration with him and formed close personal and intellectual ties with his other students—Cesare Segre, Gian Luigi Beccaria and Bice Mortara Garavelli. The ties would last a lifetime, and Corti (who never married) very often spoke of these scholars as her "family".

Her first major university post came in 1962 when she was appointed to the chair of Italian language history at the University of Lecce. That same year she published her first work of fiction, L'ora di tutti, an historical novel set in Otranto. She had written two other novels in 1947. The first of these, originally titled Il treno della pazienza and based on her experiences commuting by train between her teaching job in Brescia and her home in Milan, was published in a revised version in 1981 as Cantare al buio. The second, La leggenda di domani, was published posthumously in 2007 with an introduction by Cesare Segre. Set in Apulia, the novel tells the story of a young orphan girl from Milan who seeks refuge with a fisherman's family in Santa Maria di Leuca.

In 1964, Corti returned to the University of Pavia, where she was given a permanent appointment as a professor of Italian Language History. She remained at Pavia for the rest of her career where her scholarship, along with that of Cesare Segre, D'Arco Silvio Avalle, and Dante Isella, Corti's scholarship created the so-called "Pavia school" of philology and semiotics. At Pavia, she also established the Fondo Manoscritti di Autori Moderni e Contemporanei, an extensive curated archive of autograph manuscripts and other documents by 19th- and 20th-century Italian writers. She founded and edited the journal Autografo which published scholarly work based on material in the archive, as well as two other journals Alfabeta and Strumenti critici.

Corti continued working up until the time of her death. The manuscript of her last work, Scritti su Cavalcanti e Dante, was handed to her publisher in early February 2002. She died of respiratory failure in Milan two weeks later at the age of 86. Her funeral was held at the University of Pavia attended by her colleagues and students, Umberto Eco, and the presidents of the Accademia della Crusca and the Accademia dei Lincei. Following the funeral, she was buried in her maternal family tomb in Pellio Intelvi. Volume 44 of Autografo, dedicated entirely to Corti's life and work and including previously unpublished pages from her diary, was published later that year.

== Principal works ==
Philology and literary criticism

- Studi sulla latinitià merovingia in testi agiografici minori (Principato, 1939)
- Studi sulla sintassi della lingua poetica avanti lo Stilnovo (Olschki 1953)
- Metodi e fantasmi (Feltrinelli, 1969), republished in 1997 in an expanded edition under the title Nuovi metodi e fantasmi
- I metodi attuali della critica in Italia, co-authored with Cesare Segre (ERI, 1970)
- Entro dipinta gabbia: Tutti gli scritti inediti, rari e editi 1809-1810 di Giacomo Leopardi, (Bompiani, 1972)
- Princìpi della comunicazione letteraria (Bompiani, 1976), published in English translation as An Introduction to Literary Semiotics (Indiana University Press, 1978)
- II viaggio testuale. Le ideologie e le strutture semiotiche (Einaudi, 1978)
- Beppe Fenoglio. Storia di un «continuum» narrativo (Liviana, 1978)
- Una lingua di tutti: Pratica, storia e grammatica della lingua italiana, co-authored with Emilio Manzotti and Flavia Ravazzoli (Le Monnier, 1979)
- Dante a un nuovo crocevia (Sansoni-Le lettere, 1981)
- La felicità mentale: Nuove prospettive per Cavalcanti e Dante (Einaudi, 1983)
- Per filo e per segno: Grammatica italiana per il biennio, co-authored with Claudia Caffi (Bompiani, 1989)
- Storia della lingua italiana e storia dei testi (Ricciardi, 1989)
- Percorsi dell'invenzione: Il linguaggio poetico e Dante (Einaudi, 1993)
- Ombre dal fondo (Einaudi, 1997)
- Un ponte tra latino e italiano (Interlinea, 2002)
- Scritti su Cavalcanti e Dante (Einaudi, 2003)

Fiction

- L'ora di tutti (Feltrinelli, 1962)
- II ballo dei sapienti (Mondadori, 1966)
- Cantare nel buio (Farfengo, 1981)
- Voci del nord-est: Taccuino americano (Bompiani, 1986)
- II canto delle sirene (Bompiani, 1989)
- Otranto allo specchio, (All'insegna del pesce d'oro, 1990)
- Catasto magico (Einaudi, 1999)
- Storie (Manni, 2000)
- Le pietre verbali (Einaudi, 2001)
- La leggenda di domani (Manni, 2007)
