= Guido Morselli =

Italian novelist and essayist (1912–1973)

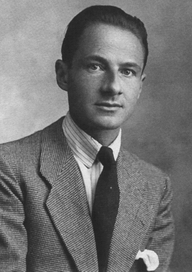
- Morselli in the 1950's
- Born: August 15, 1912; Bologna, Italy
- Died: July 30, 1973 (aged 60); Varese, Italy
- Cause of death: Suicide by gunshot
- Education: University of Milan
- Years active: 1938–1973

Guido Morselli (August 15, 1912 – July 30, 1973) was an Italian novelist, essayist and literay critic. Born in Bologna, he studied law at the University of Milan and served as an officer in the Italian Army during World War II.

== Early life and education ==
Morselli was born in Bologna, the second son of a well-to-do family belonging to Bolognese bourgeoisie. Giovanni Morselli, his father, was a manager of Carlo Erba, a pharmaceutical firm, while his mother, Olga Vincenzi, was the daughter of one of the most prestigious lawyers in Bologna. The family moved to Milan in 1914. Morselli's childhood was quite serene, but his mother suffered from Spanish flu in 1922 and had to be committed to hospital for a long time.

The absence of his mother had a strong impact on Morselli's personality, also due to his father's frequent travels; when his mother died in 1924, the loss struck the twelve-year-old boy powerfully. The relations between Morselli and his father, who was often away from home, deteriorated. He developed a restless, unsociable character; he did not like school, although he was quite brilliant and loved reading. Morselli failed his final secondary school exams in 1930 at the Liceo Parini, and barely managed to pass them in the following year. He studied law at the Università Statale di Milano to please his authoritarian father, but he started writing short journalistic essays without trying to have them published.

== Career ==
After his graduation in 1935, Morselli served in the Italian Army, attending the officer course for the Alpini corps. He then was sent to an infantry regiment in Milan. Subsequently, he lived abroad (1936–37), writing reportages and short stories which remain unpublished.

Morselli was an eclectic author whose oeuvre contains specimens of different genres. While Il comunista is a solid realistic novel which analyses the existential crisis of a Communist Party cadre in the 1960s, Past Conditional belongs to the genre of alternate histories, inasmuch as it tells the counterfactual story of how the Austrian Empire won the Great War (by defeating Italy using blitzkrieg tactics well before their time). Dissipatio H. G. is a surrealistic fantasy novel where humankind disappears leaving its cities behind; only the narrator remains, and he wanders between Italy and Switzerland, contemplating the empty cities; Roma senza papa was clearly written in the wake of Vatican Council II, as it describes what happens in Rome once a radical reformist Pope has left it, because he considers the city too corrupt to host a religious and spiritual authority. All his novels have a very strong philosophical side, and his characters often present readers with deep and complex meditations on history, religion, politics, etc. However, Michele Mari has underscored the importance of solitude in Morselli's oeuvre, which somewhat mirrors his real personality.

== Later life and death ==
Morselli's father pushed Guido towards a managerial career, and had him hired at Caffaro (a chemical company) as a promoter. This experience only lasted one year, and it worsened the relations between father and son. After the death of his beloved sister Luisa in 1938, Guido obtained life income from his father which enabled him to devote himself to reading, researching, and writing. He kept writing short essays, and began a diary, which he continued until his death. All of his novels and essays were posthumously published after Morselli committed suicide in 1973.

== Legacy ==
The "Premio Guido Morselli" was established in 2008 by Professor Silvio Raffo and Linda Terziroli. The Literary Award takes place annually and is spread over several months, consisting in a series of conferences concerning Morselli's work and the final ceremony. It usually takes place between Varese, where Morselli spent most of his life, and Switzerland.

== Works ==
=== Fiction ===
- Roma senza papa: Cronache romane di fine secolo ventesimo, Milan, 1974;
- Past Conditional: A Retrospective Hypothesis (Contro-passato prossimo: Un'ipotesi retrospettiva, 1975), tr. Hugh Shankland, 1989;
- Divertimento 1889 (Divertimento 1889, 1975), tr. Hugh Shankland, 1986;
- Il comunista, Milan, 1976; The Communist, tr. Frederika Randall, 2017;
- Dissipatio H. G., Milan, 1977; Dissipatio H.G.: The Vanishing, tr. Frederika Randall, 2020;
- Un dramma borghese, Milan, 1978;
- Incontro col comunista, Milan, 1980;
- Uomini e amori, Milan, 1998.

=== Essays ===
- Proust o del sentimento, Milan, 1943;
- Realismo e fantasia, Milan, 1947;
- Fede e critica, Milan, 1977;
- Diario, Ed. V. Fortichiari, Milan, 1988.
- La felicità non è un lusso, Milan, 1994.
- Una rivolta e altri scritti, Milan, 2013.

== See also ==
- Maria Corti
