= Alfabeta =

Monthly cultural and literary magazine in Italy (1979–1988)

- Categories: Cultural magazine; Literary magazine
- Frequency: Monthly
- Publisher: Multhipla; Intrapresa
- Founder: Nanni Balestrini
- First issue: May 1979
- Final issue: December 1988
- Country: Italy
- Based in: Milan
- Language: Italian
- OCLC: 145380283

alfabeta was a monthly cultural and literary magazine published between 1979 and 1988 in Milan, Italy. The magazine was the cultural landmark in the country during its existence.

== History and profile ==
alfabeta was established in Milan by Nanni Balestrini in May 1979. It was originally published by Multhipla and then Intrapresa. The editorial board included Maria Corti, Umberto Eco, Francesco Leonetti, Antonio Porta, Pier Aldo Rovatti and Paolo Volponi.

alfabeta produced in-depth articles about culture, philosophy and politics along with previews and reviews of books, contemporary art exhibitions, theatre shows and cinema. Poet Gian Mario Villalta started his career as a contributor to the magazine in 1986.

alfabeta ceased publication in 1988 and the last issue appeared in December that year. Its successor is alfabeta2, which was launched in 2010.

== See also ==
- List of magazines in Italy
