= I Am God (novel) =

Novel by Giacomo Sartori

- First edition
- Author: Giacomo Sartori
- Original title: Sono Dio
- Translator: Frederika Randall
- Language: Italian
- Genre: Satire, comedy, epistolary
- Publication date: 1 May 2016
- Publication place: Italy
- English publication date: 5 February 2019
- ISBN: 9781632062147

I Am God, originally published as Sono Dio, is an Italian novel by Giacomo Sartori about the Abrahamic God falling in love with a mortal woman. First published in 2016 and translated into English by Frederika Randall in 2019, it was a critical and commercial success.

== Plot ==
I Am God opens with God beginning to keep a journal about his view on modern society, and in particular his infatuation with Daphne, a young geneticist. Daphne, an atheist post-punk and anti-Catholic activist, attracts God's attention although he fails to understand why. Much of the book is epistolary, with God as a first-person narrator through his journal, discussing his thoughts on a humanity he finds unsatisfying; language is recent to him, as the God of the novel has mostly disclaimed and damned humanity on the basis of thinking human language and thought to be evil. The plot also features a love triangle between Daphne, God, and her mortal boyfriend Giovanni, an alcoholic and sexually uninhibited paleontologist.

The God of I Am God has been characterized as neurotic, garrulous, and overly verbose. He also holds conservative views on matters of gender and sexuality, being called "half heteronormative deity, half embarrassing uncle" by Martin Riker of The New York Times.

== Reception ==
I Am God received mostly positive reviews. Michael Alec Rose of BookPage described the novel as "delightful, strikingly current, [and] infectiously readable" and compared Sartori to great historical Italian religious artists such as Michelangelo and Dante Alighieri, saying "in his modest and profound way, Sartori belongs in this terrific company". R. P. Finch of The Philadelphia Inquirer called it "a pleasure to read", but criticized the plot for being overly complex, while Publishers Weekly referred to it as "an immensely satisfying feat of imagination". James Livingston of The New Republic wrote a particularly in-depth review, interpreting I Am God as a meditation on the human focus on death and mortality, concepts alien to an immortal deity.

Kirkus Reviews and The New York Times both gave more mixed reviews. Kirkus criticized the book for lacking sharpness and for what it interpreted as homophobic content, while The New York Times, while overall positive, found the characters to be overly simplistic and the humour perhaps weakened by translation.

Italian reviewers were also positive about Sono Dio, the original Italian novel. Gabriele Sabatini of Flaneri praised the novel for its sense of spirit and vigour, while Stefano Zangrando of L'Indice dei libri del mese endorsed the humour and prose.

== See also ==
- Portrayals of God in popular media
