= Cesare Segre =

Italian philologist and linguist (1928–2014)

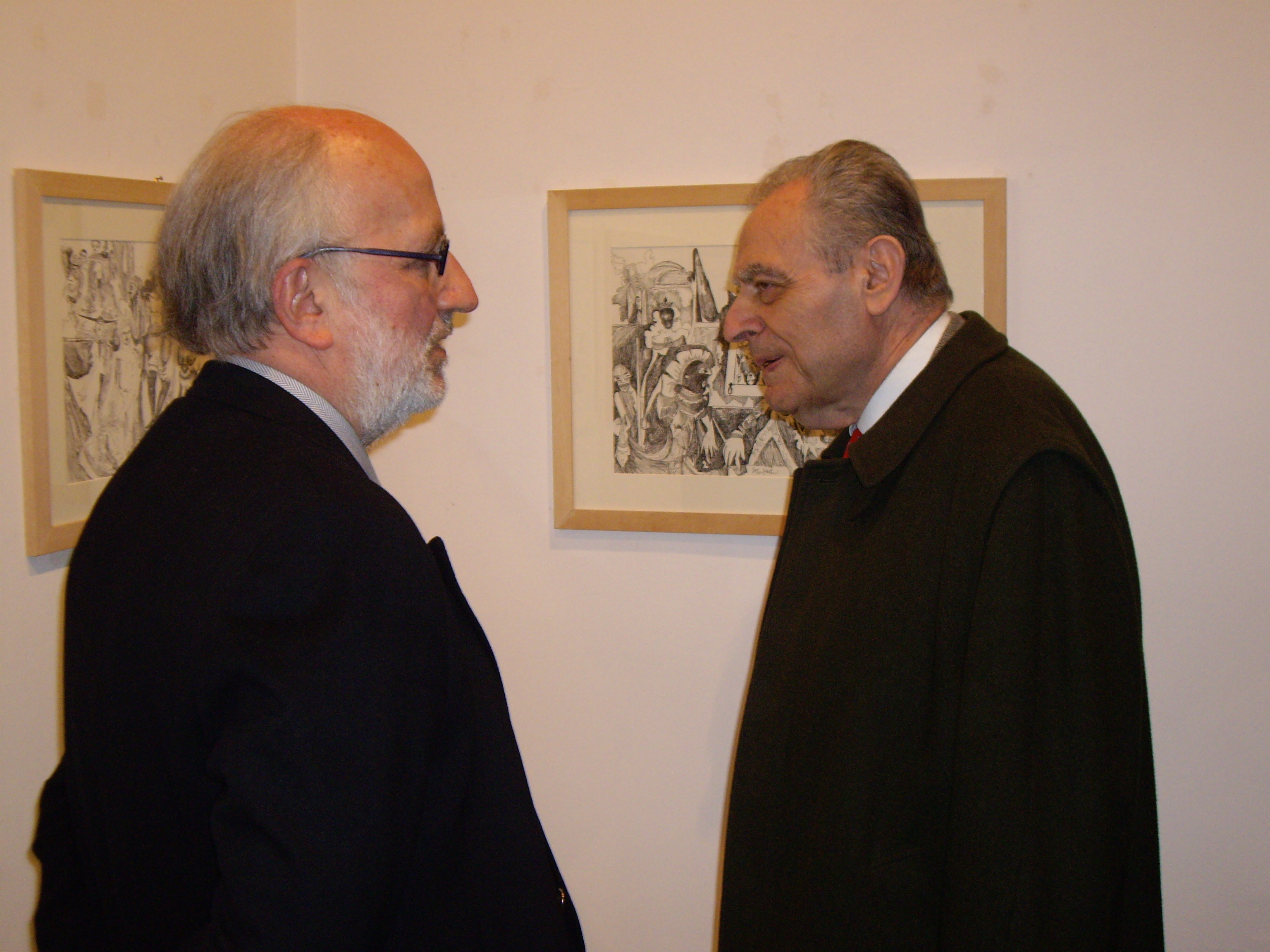
- Cesare Segre at right
- Born: 4 April 1928; Verzuolo, Italy
- Died: 16 March 2014; Milan, Italy
- Occupation: Philologist
- Spouse: Maria Luisa Meneghetti
- Writing career
- Genres: historical, philological, semiotics

Cesare Segre (4 April 1928 – 16 March 2014) was an Italian philologist, semiotician and literary critic of Jewish descent, and the Director of the Texts and Textual Traditions Research Centre of the Institute for Advanced Studies of Pavia (IUSS).

Segre was born in Verzuolo, Province of Cuneo. He lived and studied in Turin, where he was awarded his degree in 1950, a pupil of Benvenuto Terracini and famous uncle Santorre Debenedetti. A professor of Romance Philology since 1954, he taught at the universities of Trieste and Pavia, where in the 1960s he became Chair of this discipline. Segre was also a visiting professor at the University of Manchester, University of Rio de Janeiro, Harvard University, Princeton University, and UC Berkeley.

He collaborated with numerous academic magazines and journals, among which: Studi di filologia italiana, Cultura neolatina, L'Approdo letterario; he has also been the editor of Paragone; director with Maria Corti, D'Arco Silvio Avalle and Dante Isella, of Strumenti critici; co-director of Medioevo romanzo (of which he was also one of the founders) and the series Critica e filologia published by Feltrinelli. He has also edited with Carlo Ossola an anthology of Italian poetry published by Einaudi.

Segre was married to Maria Luisa Meneghetti (born 1950), also a professor of Romance philology, at the University of Milan.

He was the president of the International Association for Semiotic Studies. With his important research, Segre has contributed to the introduction of formalist and structural theories in Italian literary critique. From a theoretical and methodological point of view, pivotal are his studies in this area, such as:

- I segni e la critica (Einaudi, Turin 1969);
  - Semiotics and Literary Criticism (Walter De Gruyter, 1973)
- I metodi attuali della critica in Italia (Eri, Turin 1970), with Maria Corti;
- Le strutture e il tempo (Einaudi, Turin 1974);
  - Structures and Time : Narration, poetry, Models (University of Chicago Press, 1979)
- Avviamento all'analisi del testo letterario (Einaudi, Turin 1985),
  - Introduction to the Analysis of the Literary Text (Indiana University Press, 1988)

And also:

- Lingua, stile e società (Milano: Feltrinelli, 1963)
- Fuori del mondo. I modelli nella follia e nelle immagini dell'aldilà (Torino: Einaudi, 1990)
- Notizie dalla crisi. Dove va la critica letteraria?, Einaudi, Torino 1993
- Le varianti e la storia. Il Canzoniere di Francesco Petrarca, con due interventi di Giovanni Giudici e Alessandro Pancheri, Lezione Sapegno 1999, Bollati Boringhieri, Torino 1999
- Ritorno alla critica, Einaudi, Torino 2001
- Tempo di bilanci. La fine del Novecento, Einaudi, Torino 2005
- I segni e la critica. Fra strutturalismo e semiologia. Con una nuova introduzione, Einaudi, Torino 2008 (updated reprint with a new introduction)
- Dieci prove di fantasia, Einaudi, Torino 2010
- Critica e critici (Torino: Einaudi, 2012)
- Opera critica (Milano: Mondadori, 2014)

In 1999 he published an autobiography, Per curiosità. Una specie di autobiografia (Einaudi).

A bibliography of his writings has been published in 2009:

- Bibliografia degli scritti di Cesare Segre a cura di Alberto Conte (Firenze: Sismel)

== Prizes ==
- The Feltrinelli Prize
- The Grinzane Cavour Prize for Essay
