= Pier-Ambrogio Curti =

Italian writer and politician (1819–1899)

Pier Ambrogio Curti
- Born: 1819-09-02; Milan
- Died: 1899-11-16; Milan
- Occupations: Writer, historian, lawyer, politician

Pier Ambrogio Curti (1819–1899) was an Italian writer, historian, lawyer, and politician.

== Biography ==
Pier Ambrogio Curti was born in Milan on 2 August 1819. His ancient Lombard family is traced back to the 10th century. After completing his humanistic studies, Pier Ambrogio Curti entered the seminary in Lecco for theological studies, but soon realised that he was more interested in the humanities. He thus abandoned his ecclesiastical career and moved to Pavia to study law.

In Pavia, he wrote the Racconti storici danteschi, which he later published in Milan under the title Storie italiane del XII secolo narrate con la scorta della Divina Commedia. Also during this period, he wrote La figlia dell'armajuolo, a Milanese history of the 16th century. He started to collaborate with some literary magazines, already beginning to show a certain impatience with Austrian domination. Somewhere around 1841 he became friends with the actress Adelaide Ristori, to whom he dedicated a lively and affectionate biography in 1855.

After graduating in 1844, he began practicing law at the Criminal Court and then at the Civil Court. During that time, he wrote the volume Tradizioni e leggende di Lombardia (Traditions and Legends of Lombardy). Having completed his forensic practice, he became a lawyer.

On 20 March 1848, he became a member of the Public Security Committee under chairman Angelo Fava. Curti, trying to penetrate the Palace of Criminal Justice from which the Austrian military garrison had been driven out with the intention of disposing of the files of political trials against Italians, reached it in time to prevent all the prisoners from escaping. In April 1848, Curti left the committee and retained the office of Councillor of Grace for the revision of criminal trials.

With the subsequent victory of the Austrians, Pier Ambrogio Curti was forced to take refuge in Switzerland with his wife Matilde Ferrabini; but forced shortly afterwards to return to Milan, he suffered the first revenge of the Austrians: Marshal Radetzky had removed his name from the list of lawyers. He was, however, readmitted to the practice of law through the intercession of his father, a creditor of Count Pachta, Radetzky's right-hand man and general intendant of the Austro-Hungarian army. However, in 1855 Curti was again suspended from the bar, having been subjected to a political trial for 'disturbing the public tranquility against the political nexus of the state', because of an article in which he criticised the finale of the third act of Meyerbeer's opera The Prophet, calling it 'the thievest thing', since that finale recalled the first bars of the Austrian national anthem.

In the summer of 1858, Curti published La Madama di Celan which caused him much trouble with the Austrian police due to its political allusions. The novel was republished in a second, revised edition in 1875. It was during this period that his friendship with Ippolito Nievo flourished, who wrote to Curti in November 1858, asking for his help in finding a publisher willing to publish Le confessioni d'un italiano (Confessions of an Italian).

In 1859, Curti was again searched by the Austrian police for arrest and was forced to take refuge in Lugano. When Italian unity was finally achieved and Austrian persecution ceased, Pier Ambrogio Curti had the honour of being elected to the first Italian Parliament from the College of Castiglione delle Stiviere in 1867.

In the years that followed, from 1872 to 1874, he published Pompei e le sue rovine (Pompeii and its ruins) in three volumes, in which he also explained public and private life of the Romans; then a version of Publilius Syrus' Mimiambi, translated into Italian for the first time, and the Escursioni autunnali under the title Il Lago di Como e il Pian d'Erba. He also wrote two volumes entitled Veglie storiche di famiglia published in 1869, and a volume of romantic novellas entitled Fiori appassiti. His last work published in 1878 was Livia Augusta, a historical study in novel form, rich in historical and archaeological notes.

Pier Ambrogio Curti died in Milan on 16 November 1899 at the age of eighty.

== Sources ==
- De Gubernatis, Angelo (1879). Dizionario biografico degli scrittori contemporanei diretto da Angelo De Gubernatis (in Italian). Successori Le Monnier.
- Belloni, Valeria (2012). "L'avvocatura lombarda nell'età della Restaurazione. Un ceto in assoluto declino?" (in Italian).
- Zangrandi, Alessandra (2016). Stile e racconto nelle lettere di Ippolito Nievo. Libreria Universitaria. ISBN 978-88-6292-737-6.
