= Gian Luigi Beccaria =

Italian linguist and writer (born 1936)

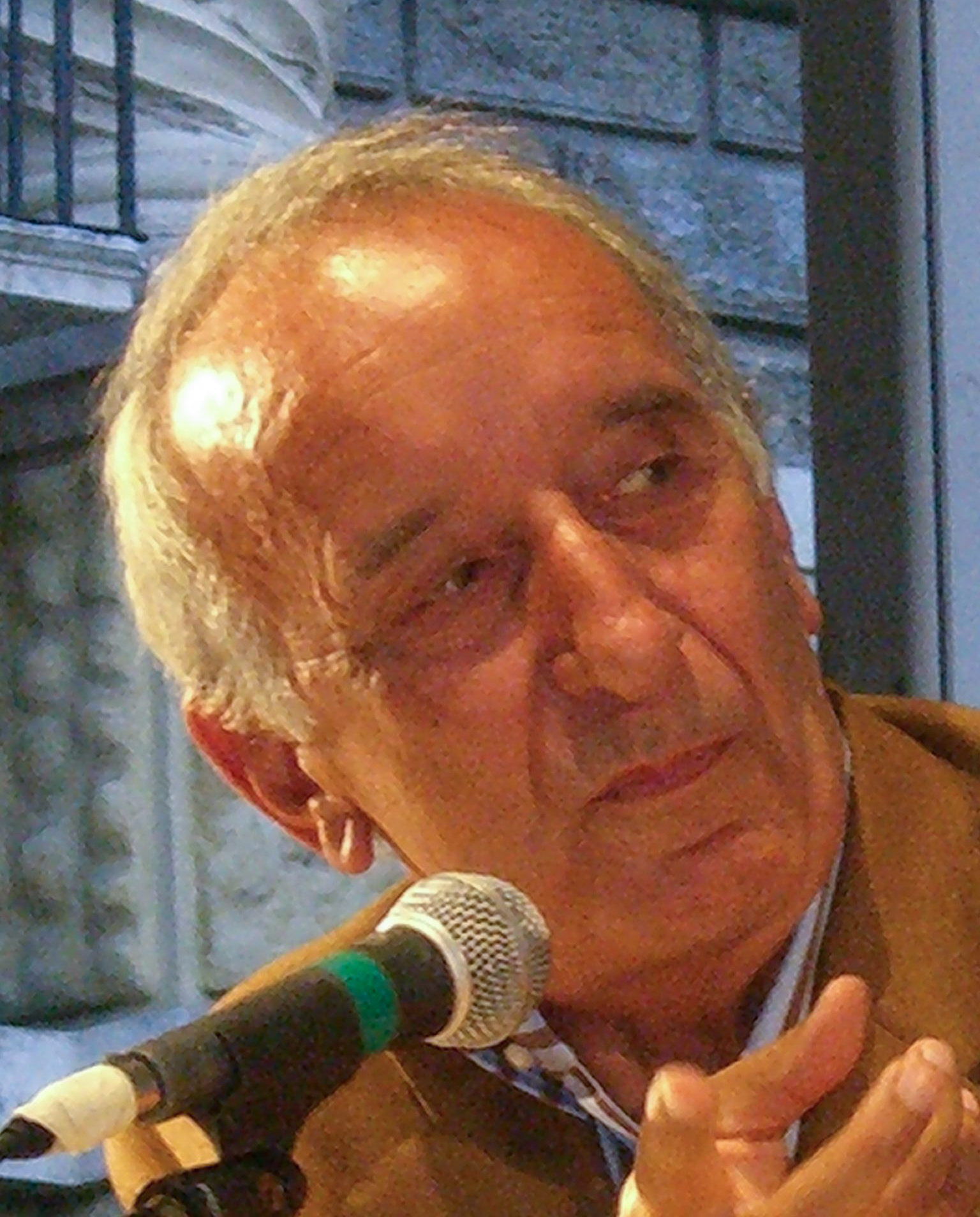
- Beccaria at Festivaletteratura in Mantua in 2007
- Born: 27 January 1936 (age 90); Costigliole Saluzzo, Italy
- Education: University of Turin
- Occupations: Linguist; lexicographer; essayist; literary critic
- Employers: University of Salamanca; University of Turin
- Known for: Studies on the Italian language and Italian literary style

Gian Luigi Beccaria (born 27 January 1936) is an Italian linguist, lexicographer, essayist and literary critic. He was professor of the history of the Italian language at the University of Turin, where he later became professor emeritus. He edited Einaudi's Dizionario di linguistica e di filologia, metrica, retorica and has written on the Italian language, literary style, dialects, food terminology and the cultural history of words.

== Biography ==
Beccaria was born in Costigliole Saluzzo, in the province of Cuneo, on 27 January 1936. He studied in Mondovì and Turin, graduating in glottology at the University of Turin in 1959 under Benvenuto Terracini.

From 1960 to 1963 he was a lecturer and acting professor of historical grammar of the Italian language at the University of Salamanca in Spain. He then joined the Faculty of Letters and Philosophy at the University of Turin, first as an assistant in glottology and later as a professor. From 1970 he taught the history of the Italian language at Turin, where he subsequently became professor emeritus. His work spans the history of the language, literary style and the relationship between learned and popular linguistic traditions.

== Scholarship and publications ==
Beccaria directed the Dizionario di linguistica e di filologia, metrica, retorica for Einaudi, a reference work of about 2,000 signed entries with a bibliography and cross-references. His scholarly contributions include studies of specialized languages in Italy, older and modern Italian, literary syntax and rhythm, and the vocabulary of popular culture and religious tradition.

His publications include I linguaggi settoriali in Italia, Italiano antico e nuovo, L'autonomia del significante, I nomi del mondo: santi, demoni, folletti e le parole perdute, Sicuterat: il latino di chi non lo sa, Per difesa e per amore: la lingua italiana oggi, Tra le pieghe delle parole, Misticanze: parole del gusto, linguaggi del cibo and Mia lingua italiana.

Beccaria has collaborated with periodicals, journals and newspapers including L'Indice dei libri del mese and La Stampa. Between 1985 and 1988 on Rai 1, and later during the 2002–03 television season on Rai 3, he appeared as a judge-arbitrator and commentator on the television programme Parola mia, created and presented by Luciano Rispoli.

== Memberships ==
Beccaria is an emeritus member of the Accademia della Crusca, where he became a member in 1995 and an academician in 2003. He is also a member of the Academy of Sciences of Turin, to which he was elected as a corresponding member on 9 March 1993 and later as a national member, and of the Accademia Nazionale dei Lincei, which elected him in 2012.
