= Carlo Ossola =

Italian philologist, literary critic, and historian (born 1946)

Carlo Maria Ossola
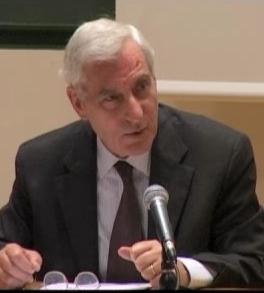
- Ossola in 2008
- Born: 11 March 1946 (age 80); Turin, Italy
- Occupations: Philologist, literary critic

Carlo Ossola (born 11 March 1946 in Turin) is an Italian philologist, literary critic and literature historian. Since 2000, he holds the chair of modern literature of Neo-Latin Europe at the Collège de France. He has previously taught at the University of Geneva, University of Padua and University of Turin, and from 2007 to 2017 has directed the Institute of Italian studies at the Università della Svizzera italiana. He is a corresponding fellow of the British Academy.
