= Dissipatio H. G. =

1977 posthumous novel by Guido Morselli

- Author: Guido Morselli
- Translator: Frederika Randall
- Language: Italian
- Genre: Post-Apocalyptic
- Publisher: Adelphi, NYRB Classics (English)
- Publication date: 1977
- Publication place: Italy
- English publication date: 2020
- Pages: 156

Dissipatio H. G. (Note: Also written as Dissipatio H.G. or Dissipatio H.G.: The Vanishing) is a post-apocalyptic novel by Italian writer Guido Morselli, written in 1973 but published in 1977, four years after his suicide, by Adelphi. It was first translated into English by Frederika Randall for NYRB Classics in 2020.

It follows an unnamed narrator in a fictional European country roughly resembling Switzerland, who attempts suicide by drowning in a lake in a mountain cave on the evening of his 40th birthday. When the attempt fails, he leaves the cave and slowly discovers that the entire population of the Earth has disappeared, leaving behind no trace of themselves, but nature and their creations remain.

As Morselli's final work before his suicide, it has frequently been interpreted as an autobiographical work, though the exact extent to which this is true is debated. The title is an allusion to an alleged work by the philosopher Iamblichus, though its existence is also uncertain; Randall believed that the reference was invented by Morselli.

== Plot ==
Dissipatio H. G. begins in medias res, with the unnamed narrator walking in the empty streets of Chrysopolis, a fictional city-state and banking center located somewhere in a mountainous region of Europe. He had just visited the office of his previous employer, a newspaper, where the machinery and electronics were still active, but none of the people were present.

As he returns home, he explains what caused the disappearance, which he calls "the Event". Roughly two weeks earlier, on the night between June 1 and 2 he attempted to commit suicide. He chose the specific date so that he would die before he turned 40 on the 2nd. He gets the idea to drown himself in a nearby cave from a conversation with his neighbor, so that he would initially be reported missing, not dead. While contemplating the quality of the Spanish brandy he brought with him he finds himself unable to commit to the act and exits the cave. On his way out, he hits his head on a rock, which stuns him, as a roar of thunder goes by. He continues home, briefly stopping at a payphone to call a hotline; although he is unable to connect to a human, the phone line is still connected. When he arrives at home, he puts a gun to his mouth and pulls the trigger twice, which fails to fire, before falling asleep.

Later, he heads into the local village to look for a few friends who had said they would arrive for his birthday. He explores but finds nobody, although there are still running cars in the street. He takes one and heads to Chrysopolis, where the story began. He calls international numbers from the phone book to see if the phenomenon was local. When this fails, he heads to the airport, but no planes arrive. He heads home, but stops at his ex-girlfriend's house, believing that she may be there.

When he returns home, his sanity begins to decay, and he recalls his former psychiatrist, Doctor Karpinsky, who he considered to be his only friend. Karpinsky had died two years after the narrator left his custody, killed in a fight between asylum inmates. The narrator continues the tasks necessary for staying alive while musing philosophically about his situation, observing how nature is reclaiming the land from humanity. He builds a cenotaph of mannequins in a mall and wonders why he is the only one to have survived. Later in a hotel room he finds a letter written by a man seemingly realizing the extinction of humanity was upcoming on the night of June 1.

When passing a church, he is horrified to realize that all of the skulls and bodies have disappeared from the display that he had seen on his way to the cave, realizing that truly all remnants of humanity have disappeared. After multiple days catatonic from fear, he resolves to visit a mountainous mining town, to see if those in caves survived, but nobody is there. While calling international numbers, he hallucinates a call with Karpinsky, who says he can help him if he meets him. The narrator was not informed of where, so he resolves to visit synagogues, believing he was Jewish. He later leaves his village for the city to continue his search. He begins living in a Chrysopolis restaurant, wandering the city while waiting for Karpinsky to arrive, with a pack of Gauloises in his pocket for him.

== Background ==
Dissipatio H. G. was written by Guido Morselli in 1973; the manuscript was soon rejected, and he killed himself that same year. He had previously had two non-fiction books published, but none of his novels. The Communist had been set to be published by Rizzoli Libri, but was cancelled late in the process due to problems within the company unrelated to his book. At his death, he left rejection letters from failed manuscript submissions on his desk, along with a note saying "I bear no grudges".

Dissipatio H. G. was first published in Italy in 1977 by Adelphi Edizioni, four years after Morselli's death. Frederika Randall, who had previously translated his novel The Communist, also made the first English translation of Dissipatio H. G.; she died in May 2020, several months after finishing it, and it was released in December 2020 by NYRB Classics.

== Analysis ==
Dissipatio H. G. takes place in an "allegorical terrain" roughly equivalent to Switzerland, with Chrysopolis standing in for Zurich. Morselli himself spent much of the last 20 years of his life in relative isolation on a plot of land in Lombardy, near the border with Switzerland. Although the original text was written in Italian, it was distanced from taking place in Italy by referring to characters as Italian, as well as acknowledging that Karpinsky could not speak it.

The novel avoids having any direct call to action, instead focusing on the narrator's philosophical thoughts, which comprise much of the text. The New Yorker's Alejandro Chacoff wrote that Morselli frequently used anticlimaxes and was "resisting drama at every turn", while instead exploring loneliness and isolation. Even though he had previously been self-isolating willingly, what there is of a plot after the Event is largely about the narrator attempting to contact his only friend, Karpinsky, who is known to have been dead for sure even prior to the Event. The theme of isolation is tied in to one of the other recurring themes, the greed of society in the modern era, which the narrator is "openly disgusted by".

Unusually for post-apocalyptic "last man"-style works, such as Shiel's The Purple Cloud or Shelley's The Last Man, there is no real attempt whatsoever to explain the nature of the Event that caused the disappearance of humanity. It is suggested that some sort of supernatural event, linked to the thunderstorm in the cave on the night of the attempted suicide, may have been the cause, but the thread is ultimately not truly pursued. More frequently the entire reality of the situation is questioned, such as if one of the two suicide attempts that night were successful. At one point the narrator addresses the absurdity of his situation, which those in his field of work would interpret as a "medium for social satire", attempting to deny allegorical interpretations metatextually.

=== Title ===
The title Dissipatio H. G. is an allusion to a Latin-language text, Dissipatio Humani Generis, supposedly written by the philosopher Iamblichus in the 3rd or 4th century, in which humanity vaporizes into a gas. Randall believed the text to be entirely fictional; The Los Angeles Review of Books' Jamie Richards speculated that the apparently-fictional reference may have been an "intentional dead-end" to serve as a "last-laugh prank" on the literary community that had ignored him. It literally refers to a "dissipation", as in vanishing into thin air, which was not a term that was used by contemporary eschatologists. In Suicide in Modern Literature, Roberto Risso argues that, although Iamblichus's works do not use those three words in that order, recurring themes in one of his works about isolation, caves, and dissolution prove its relevance to the novel Dissipatio H. G.. He draws a parallel between Iamblichus writing of an oracle in Colophon giving answers after drinking from a "fountain in a subterranean welling" to the narrator's musings of brandy over the lake where he planned his suicide. As such, Risso interprets the phrase as being a work of "transliteration and adaptation" more than it is a fake quote.

=== Autobiographical elements ===
Dissipatio H. G. is frequently taken to be an autobiographical work. Suicide is a prominent theme and the perceived relation to Morselli's own suicide after the rejection of the manuscript is very commonly noted in analysis, even more so than in his other posthumously published works. Similarly to the narrator attempting to commit suicide before he turned 40, Morselli died about two weeks before he would have turned 61. At one point the narrator says that he is "in a search for lost time", an allusion to one of the two books Morselli managed to get published himself, on Proust. In her book After Words: Suicide and Authorship in Twentieth-Century Italy, Elizabeth Leake argues that Morselli is instead referencing his own life and works in a parody of autobiographical works and "literary self-plagiarism". The fictional narrator has successfully published works, but is entirely unbothered when they are eaten by a cow; he also makes allusions to Morselli's previous novels, making an "ironic self-mockery" of them during a scene where he was knowingly losing his own sanity. Risso noted that Dissipatio H. G. being written in the first person, along with other autobiographical elements, contributed to this perception, but thought the relationship was frequently exaggerated.

== Reception ==
Dissipatio H. G. received generally positive reviews. The focus on the narrator's thoughts about his situation and the beauty present were well received, though Publishers Weekly considered the more abstract philosophy sometimes "pedantic". The New York Times Book Review's Dustin Illingworth wrote that it showed a "richly speculative portrait of early Anthropocene resignation", while Andrew Stuttaford wrote in The New Criterion that some of the "irritating" aspects of the return-to-nature themes did not outweigh his appreciation of the storytelling and "melancholy allure" that Morselli offered. Morselli's depictions of loneliness were well received in general.

Randall's introduction and endnotes were praised, along with her work on the novel's translation. Richards was less happy with the translation itself; while not discrediting her work as a translator, and considering many of her previous translations "impressive", he felt that the translation was a lower quality, potentially due to her dislike of the protagonist that was visible in the introduction. Conversely, The New York Review of Books' Geoffrey Brock praised the quality of the translation, also saying that Randall was the driving force behind getting many of the books she worked on translated, and that she "chose to translate only books that she admired and believed in" that reflected the best of Italian literature.
