= Nanni Balestrini =

Italian poet, author and artist (1935–2019)

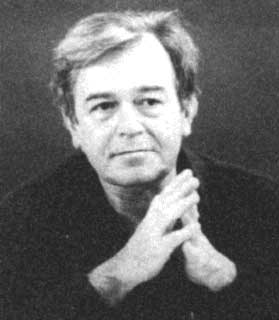
- Born: 2 July 1935; Milan, Italy
- Died: 19 May 2019 (aged 83); Rome, Italy
- Occupations: Novelist, essayist, screenwriter
- Writing career
- Genres: Novel, essay, screenwriting
- Notable work: Vogliamo tutto
- Literary movement: Neoavanguardia

Nanni Balestrini (2 July 1935 – 19 May 2019) was an Italian experimental poet, author and visual artist of the Neoavanguardia movement.

== Context ==
Nanni Balestrini is associated with the Italian writers' movement Neoavanguardia. He wrote for the magazine Il Verri, founded and co-directed the now-defunct Alfabeta and was one of the Italian writers published in the anthology I Novissimi (1961).

Balestrini was born in Milan. During the 1960s, as the group was growing and becoming the Gruppo 63, Balestrini was the editor of their publications. From 1962 to 1972, he was working for Feltrinelli, cooperating with the Marsilio publishers and editing some issues of the Cooperativa Scrittori. In 1968, Balestrini was co-founder of the Potere Operaio political group and in 1976 was an important supporter of the Autonomia Operaia. In 1979, he was accused of membership in a guerrilla group and fled to Paris and later Germany.

Balestrini became known to a larger public thanks to his first novel We Want Everything (Vogliamo tutto, 1971). It describes the struggles and conflicts in the car factory of FIAT. In the following years, the social movements of his time continued to be his subject. With the book The Unseen, he created a literary monument for the "Generation of 1977". It shows the atmosphere of rapid social change during these years, concretised in house occupations, the creation of free radios and more, and also shows the considerable repression by the state of these movements. Other important works by Balestrini include: I Furiosi, dedicated to the football supporters culture of the AC Milan, and The Editor, dealing with Giangiacomo Feltrinelli. Especially in his book The Golden Horde, co-written with Primo Moroni, his proximity to operaismo is obvious. His final novel, published while he was still living, Sandokan (2004), deals with the Camorra in Casal di Principe.

His experimental "novel" Tristano was conceived to be read by each reader differently, since each sentence is randomly shuffled. Originally conceived in 1966, it had to await publication till the age of print-on-demand, but critic Tim Martin found one of its 109 trillion versions "drifting, impressionistic and oddly compelling." Emanuela Patti contends that Nanni Balestrini’s Tape Mark I, was the first Italian electronic literature work. Alessandra Di Tella contrasts Tristano, with Hazel Smith's novelling, a 2016 generative work that also randomly shuffles text.

== Publications ==
=== English ===
- Lawrence R. Smith (ed.), The New Italian Poetry, 1945 to the Present, University of California Press, 1981.
- The Unseen (Gli Invisibili), trans. Liz Heron, Verso, 1989. 2nd Edition 2012 with introduction by Antonio Negri.
- Sandokan, trans. Antony Shugaar, Melville House Publishing, 2009.
- Two Short Stories: Let a Thousand Hands Reach Out to Pick Up The Gun / FIAT, Bandit Press & Shortfuse Press, 2010.
- Tristano, trans. Mike Harakis, Verso, 2014 [1966]. With an introduction by Umberto Eco.
- We Want Everything (Vogliamo Tutto), trans. Matt Holden, Verso, 2016 [1971], reissued 2022. With introduction by Rachel Kushner.
- Blackout, trans. Peter Valente, Commune Editions, 2017. With an introduction by Franco ‘Bifo’ Berardi.

=== Italian ===
==== Poetry ====
- Come si agisce, Feltrinelli, 1963.
- Ma noi facciamone un'altra, Feltrinelli, 1966.
- Poesie pratiche, antologia 1954-1969, Einaudi, 1976.
- Le ballate della signorina Richmond, Coop. Scrittori, 1977.
- Blackout, DeriveApprodi, 2009 [2001].
- Ipocalisse, Scheiwiller, 1986.
- Il ritorno della signorina Richmond, Becco giallo, 1987.
- Osservazioni sul volo degli uccelli, poesie 1954-56, Scheiwiller, 1988.
- Il pubblico del labirinto, Scheiwiller, 1992.
- Estremi rimedi, Manni, 1995.
- Le avventure complete della signorina Richmond, Testo&Immagine, 1999.
- Elettra, Luca Sossella, 2001.
- Tutto in una volta, antologia 1954-2003, Edizioni del Leone, 2003.
- Sfinimondo, Bibliopolis, 2003.
- Sconnessioni, Rome, Fermenti, 2008.
- Blackout e altro, Rome, Deriveapprodi, 2009.
- Lo sventramento della storia, Rome, Polìmata, 2009.

==== Novels ====
- Tristano, DeriveApprodi, 2007 [1966].
- Vogliamo tutto, DeriveApprodi, 2004 [1971].
- La violenza illustrata, DeriveApprodi, 2001 [1976].
- Gli invisibili, DeriveApprodi, 2005 [1987].
- L'editore, DeriveApprodi, 2006 [1989].
- I furiosi, DeriveApprodi, 2004 [1994].
- Una mattina ci siam svegliati, Baldini & Castoldi, 1995.
- La Grande Rivolta, Bompiani, 1999.
- Sandokan, storia di camorra, Einaudi, 2004.

==== Short stories ====
- Disposta l'autopsia dell'anarchico morto dopo i violenti scontri di Pisa in: Paola Staccioli, In ordine pubblico, Rome, 2002, S. 25-31.

==== Various ====
- Gruppo 63, L'Antologia, (mit Alfredo Giuliani), Testo&Immagine, 2002 [1964].
- Gruppo 63. Il romanzo sperimentale, Feltrinelli, 1965.
- L'Opera di Pechino, (mit Letizia Paolozzi), Feltrinelli, 1966.
- L'orda d'oro, (mit Primo Moroni), Sugarco, 1988; Feltrinelli, 1997, 2003.
- Parma 1922, DeriveApprodi, 2002.
