= L'Indice dei libri del mese =

Italian monthly journal (since 1984)

- Editor: Mimmo Càndito
- Categories: literature, culture, current affairs
- Frequency: Monthly
- Publisher: L'Indice Scarl
- Total circulation: 12,000 (2007)
- First issue: October 1984
- Country: Italy
- Based in: Turin
- Language: Italian
- Website: www.lindiceonline.com
- ISSN: 0393-3903

L'Indice dei libri del mese (L'Indice) is an Italian monthly journal of cultural information. Founded in 1984, it is one of the longest-running and authoritative in the field. Taking inspiration from internationally renowned book reviews such as The Times Literary Supplement and The New York Review of Books, L'Indice offers its readers reviews of books and the arts (each issue contains up to a hundred book reviews), and essays on current events and cultural topics starting from the most significant literary and intellectual production in Italian.

== History ==
The history of L'Indice begins in October 1984, with the literary critic Cesare Cases’s words about what a book review is expected to achieve:

The essential is that the first moment, that is the description of a book’s contents, shall have the centrality it deserves. Connivance to the reader should not be established [...] on the basis of specialistic interest nor by formal flatteries; contents only can ground it [...] The essential is that the reader should get from the description of contents a clear idea of what the book is and of the reasons of its importance, those which have induced us to prefer it to others

In its twenty-eight years of existence, L'Indice has always remained faithful to this program. It has documented the Italian book production through reviews and notices, along with surveys, columns, interviews and articles of different sorts. Each of its editors has left his own mark on the review: Gian Giacomo Migone (1984–90) and Cesare Cases (1990–1994) have contributed to specify the original project, whose recognizable physiognomy is indissolubly associated with Tullio Pericoli's portraits and graphics, as well as with Franco Matticchio's drawings. Alberto Papuzzi (1994–1999) brought special attention to the relationship between cinema and literature/essays. Under Luca Rastello's (2000–2001) guidance, L'Indice inaugurated a new column, "Segnali" (Signals), focusing on cultural and political changes, as well as knotty issues in the society we live in. Mimmo Càndito (2001-) has enriched L'Indice with “Villaggio globale” (Global Village), hosting correspondents who write about book production in Europe and worldwide.

== Founders and contributors ==
Many distinguished Italian academics and intellectuals belong to the history of L’Indice: from those who gathered around Gian Giacomo Migone in 1984 (Piergiorgio Battaggia, Gian Luigi Beccaria, Riccardo Bellofiore, Mariolina Bertini, Eliana Bouchard, Loris Campetti, Cesare Cases, Enrico Castelnuovo, Gianfranco Corsini, Lidia De Federicis, Aldo Fasolo, Franco Ferraresi, Delia Frigessi, Luciano Gallino, Claudio Gorlier, Filippo Maone, Diego Marconi, Franco Marenco, Cesare Pianciola, Tullio Regge, Marco Revelli, Fabrizio Rondolino, Gianni Rondolino, Franco Rositi, Lore Terracini, Gian Luigi Vaccarino), to renowned contributors who have expressly written for the review, such as, among others, Norberto Bobbio, Franco Fortini, Aldo Natoli, Cesare Garboli, Claudio Magris, Vittorio Foa, Carlo Dionisotti, Salvatore Settis, Cesare De Seta, Sebastiano Timpanaro, Edoardo Sanguineti, Maria Corti, Cesare Segre, Alessandro Galante Garrone, Stefano Rodotà, Francesco Orlando, Carlo Ginzburg, Giulio Angioni, Paolo Nori, Enzo Collotti, Adriano Prosperi, Marcello De Cecco, Massimo D'Alema, Luciana Castellina.

The Editorial Board includes Enrico Alleva, Arnaldo Bagnasco, Andrea Bajani, Elisabetta Bartuli, Gian Luigi Beccaria, Mariolina Bertini (vicedirettore), Cristina Bianchetti, Bruno Bongiovanni, Guido Bonino, Giovanni Borgognone, Eliana Bouchard, Loris Campetti, Andrea Casalegno, Enrico Castelnuovo, Guido Castelnuovo, Alberto Cavaglion, Mario Cedrini, Anna Chiarloni, Sergio Chiarloni, Marina Colonna, Alberto Conte, Sara Cortellazzo, Piero Cresto-Dina, Lidia De Federicis, Piero de Gennaro, Giuseppe Dematteis, Tana De Zulueta, Michela di Macco, Aldo Fasolo (vicedirettore), Giovanni Filoramo, Delia Frigessi, Anna Elisabetta Galeotti, Gian Franco Gianotti, Claudio Gorlier, Davide Lovisolo, Giorgio Luzzi, Danilo Manera, Diego Marconi, Franco Marenco, Walter Meliga, Gian Giacomo Migone, Anna Nadotti, Alberto Papuzzi, Franco Pezzini, Cesare Pianciola, Telmo Pievani, Pierluigi Politi, Nicola Prinetti, Luca Rastello, Tullio Regge, Marco Revelli, Alberto Rizzuti, Gianni Rondolino, Franco Rositi, Lino Sau, Domenico Scarpa, Rocco Sciarrone, Giuseppe Sergi, Stefania Stafutti, Ferdinando Taviani, Mario Tozzi, Gian Luigi Vaccarino, Massimo Vallerani, Maurizio Vaudagna, Anna Viacava, Paolo Vineis, Gustavo Zagrebelsky.

== Columns and supplements ==
Along with reviews and notices, which make up the central part of the review, L'Indice includes a section devoted to cultural current events (“Segnali”) and a series of columns: “Editoria”, on editorial current events; “Villaggio globale”, on book production in Europe and worldwide; “Babele”, about semantic proliferation; “Il libro del mese” (The Book of the Month), a thorough examination of a recently published book; “Effetto film” (Movie Effect, since 1996), on cinematographic works; “Recitar cantando”, on opera events; “Camminar guardando”, on art exhibitions and current events.

In the course of time, L'Indice has published a series of special issues on themes of particular interest, hosting interventions by eminent experts and comprehensive bibliographies. Among topics covered, one could mention as examples literary translation; the role China has come to play in Italy’s publishing; globalization; protection of cultural heritage; the Italian “Southern question”. Moreover, L'Indice publishes (since 2008) a quarterly supplement, “L’Indice della scuola”, entirely devoted to the issues of education and learning in Italy, from elementary to university education; and “L’Indice dell’arte” (in its September issue), devoted to arts.

In 2004 L'Indice produced a cd-rom ("L'Indice dei libri del mese 1984-2004") including all articles published in the first twenty years of the review.

In 2007, L'Indice published a volume entitled “La cultura italiana tra autonomia e potere” (“The Italian Culture between Autonomy and Power”), the proceedings of a conference on the twenty years of the review held at the University of Turin (4 October 2005).

In 2008, L'Indice published a special issue on Cesare Cases.

Since 2019, four times a year (in March, June, October and December), L'Indice comes with Il Mignolo the supplement about children's literature. Its editor is the Italian children's writer Sara Marconi, who founded it after writing for years about children's literature in the main magazine.

Previews of each issue of L'Indice are available at the review’s website. L'Indice has recently launched its blog, with daily columns by contributors to the review.

== Conferences and projects ==
Since 1985, L'Indice has promoted the annual Literary Award "Italo Calvino" for unpublished works of fiction.

It annually organizes public debates within the Turin International Book Fair.

It monthly organizes, in collaboration with Fnac, "L'Indice puntato. Un mercoledì da lettori", a public conference and debate centred on the "Libro del mese" (The Book of the Month).

== The European dimension: "Liber" ==
In 1989, Gian Giacomo Migone, then editor of L'Indice, and Pierre Bourdieu launched the idea of a European literary and cultural journal to be published with identical contents in several European countries. Starting from apparently national, country-specific interventions, the journal aimed at emphasizing the inherent unity of the European culture in a critical historical moment of the integration process, addressing specialists and the wider public at the same time. Along with L'Indice, The Times Literary Supplement, the Frankfurter Allgemeine Zeitung, Le Monde and El País sponsored the project. A 24-pages quarterly multinational literary journal called “Liber. Revue européenne des livres” (“Liber. European Review of Books”) – deliberately playing upon the ambiguity intrinsic to the Latin root, which means both “book” and “free” – was therefore published in the biennium 1989-90 (its first issue was presented at the Frankfurt Book Fair of October 1989), with a combined circulation of over one million. The editor was Pierre Bourdieu. Jeremy Treglown (then editor of The Times Literary Supplement), Frank Schirrmarcher (Frankfurter Allgemeine Zeitung) and Thomas Ferenczi (Le Monde) joined Migone and Bourdieu in the editorial board. After five editions, “Liber” became a supplement of Bourdieu’s publication Actes de la recherche en sciences sociales.

== Awards ==
In 2009, L'Indice was awarded the International Literary Prize "Mondello – Città di Palermo".

== Editors ==
- 1984–1990: Gian Giacomo Migone
- 1990–1994: Cesare Cases
- 1994–1999: Alberto Papuzzi
- 2000–2001: Luca Rastello
- since 2001: Mimmo Càndito
