= Enrico Castelnuovo =

Italian writer

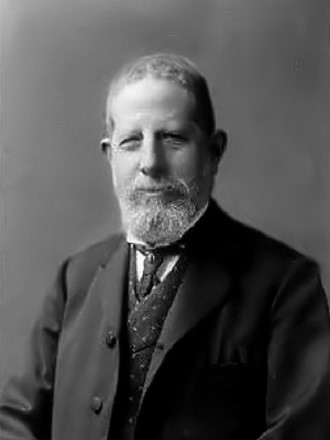
Enrico Castelnuovo

Enrico Castelnuovo (February 12, 1839 – February 16, 1915) was an Italian writer who had an active role in the Italian unification movement.

He was the father of Guido Castelnuovo.

== Literary works ==
- Il quaderno della zia, 1872 ("Aunt's notebook")
- Nevica, 1878 ("It Snows")
- Reminiscenze e fantasie, 1885 ("Reminiscences and fantasies")
- Prima di partire, 1890 ("Before leaving")
- Il ritorno dell'Aretusa, 1901 ("The return of Arethusa")
- I coniugi Varedo, 1913 ("The couple Varedo")
